= Results of the 1991 Swedish general election =

Sweden held a general election on the 15 September 1991.

== National results ==
| Party | Votes | % | Seats | | | |
| Party | Votes | % | Con. | Lev. | Tot. | +/– |
|---|---|---|---|---|---|---|
| Swedish Social Democratic Party | 2,062,761 | 37.71 | 134 | 4 | 138 | –18 |
| Moderate Party | 1,199,394 | 21.92 | 76 | 4 | 80 | +14 |
| Liberal People's Party | 499,356 | 9.13 | 29 | 4 | 33 | –11 |
| Centre Party | 465,175 | 8.50 | 25 | 6 | 31 | –11 |
| Christian Democratic Society Party | 390,351 | 7.14 | 20 | 6 | 26 | +26 |
| New Democracy | 368,281 | 6.73 | 21 | 4 | 25 | New |
| Left Party | 246,905 | 4.51 | 5 | 11 | 16 | –5 |
| Green Party | 185,051 | 3.38 | 0 | 0 | 0 | –20 |
| Sjöbopartiet | 27,635 | 0.51 | 0 | 0 | 0 | New |
| Sweden Democrats | 4,877 | 0.09 | 0 | 0 | 0 | 0 |
| Labour List | 3,645 | 0.07 | 0 | 0 | 0 | New |
| Workers Party – Communists | 2,969 | 0.05 | 0 | 0 | 0 | 0 |
| Other parties | 14,361 | 0.26 | 0 | 0 | 0 | 0 |
| Total | 5,470,761 | 100.00 | 310 | 39 | 349 | 0 |
| Valid votes | 5,470,761 | 98.34 | | | | |
| Invalid/blank votes | 92,159 | 1.66 | | | | |
| Total votes | 5,562,920 | 100.00 | | | | |
| Registered voters/turnout | 6,413,407 | 86.74 | | | | |
Source: Nohlen & Stöver, SCB

== Regional results ==
=== Percentage share ===
| Location | Turnout | Share | Votes | S | M | FP | C | KDS | NyD | V | MP | Other | Left | Right |
|---|---|---|---|---|---|---|---|---|---|---|---|---|---|---|
| Götaland | 87.2 | 48.3 | 2,643,375 | 35.9 | 22.7 | 8.6 | 9.3 | 8.4 | 6.9 | 3.7 | 3.1 | 1.4 | 39.6 | 49.0 |
| Svealand | 86.5 | 37.5 | 2,049,600 | 36.0 | 24.6 | 10.3 | 6.4 | 5.8 | 7.4 | 5.0 | 3.8 | 0.7 | 40.9 | 47.2 |
| Norrland | 85.8 | 14.2 | 777,786 | 48.4 | 12.1 | 7.8 | 11.2 | 6.3 | 4.5 | 6.1 | 3.1 | 0.5 | 54.6 | 37.5 |
| Total | 86.7 | 100.0 | 5,470,761 | 37.7 | 21.9 | 9.1 | 8.5 | 7.1 | 6.7 | 4.5 | 3.4 | 1.0 | 42.2 | 46.7 |
Source: SCB

=== By votes ===
| Location | Turnout | Share | Votes | S | M | FP | C | KDS | NyD | V | MP | Other | Left | Right |
|---|---|---|---|---|---|---|---|---|---|---|---|---|---|---|
| Götaland | 87.2 | 48.3 | 2,643,375 | 948,918 | 600,543 | 226,358 | 246,770 | 221,514 | 182,625 | 97,535 | 83,118 | 35,994 | 1,046,453 | 1,295,185 |
| Svealand | 86.5 | 37.5 | 2,049,600 | 737,258 | 504,784 | 212,090 | 131,377 | 119,492 | 150,960 | 101,652 | 78,140 | 13,847 | 838,910 | 967,743 |
| Norrland | 85.8 | 14.2 | 777,786 | 376,585 | 94,067 | 60,908 | 87,028 | 49,345 | 34,696 | 47,718 | 23,793 | 3,646 | 424,303 | 291,348 |
| Total | 86.7 | 100.0 | 5,470,761 | 2,062,761 | 1,199,394 | 499,356 | 465,175 | 390,351 | 368,281 | 246,905 | 185,051 | 53,487 | 2,309,666 | 2,554,276 |
Source: SCB

== Constituency results ==
=== Percentage share ===
| Constituency | Land | Turnout | Share | Votes | S | M | FP | C | KDS | NyD | V | MP | Other | Left | Right | Margin |
| Constituency | | % | % | | % | % | % | % | % | % | % | % | % | % | % | |
|---|---|---|---|---|---|---|---|---|---|---|---|---|---|---|---|---|
| Blekinge | G | 87.5 | 1.8 | 99,208 | 46.0 | 18.1 | 7.5 | 9.0 | 6.2 | 4.6 | 4.1 | 2.8 | 1.5 | 50.2 | 40.9 | 9,259 |
| Bohuslän | G | 87.6 | 3.6 | 195,856 | 33.5 | 22.1 | 11.6 | 8.3 | 8.7 | 7.9 | 4.0 | 3.5 | 0.4 | 37.5 | 50.6 | 25,712 |
| Gothenburg | G | 85.7 | 4.9 | 270,406 | 33.2 | 25.0 | 12.1 | 3.1 | 7.3 | 7.1 | 6.8 | 4.5 | 0.8 | 40.0 | 47.6 | 20,475 |
| Gotland | G | 85.9 | 0.7 | 36,458 | 36.2 | 16.7 | 6.6 | 20.7 | 5.0 | 6.4 | 3.8 | 4.3 | 0.2 | 40.0 | 49.1 | 3,306 |
| Gävleborg | N | 85.3 | 3.4 | 188,011 | 46.9 | 12.8 | 7.9 | 10.7 | 6.1 | 6.0 | 5.8 | 3.4 | 0.5 | 52.7 | 37.4 | 28,757 |
| Halland | G | 88.2 | 3.0 | 164,719 | 32.1 | 24.3 | 9.1 | 13.7 | 7.0 | 7.4 | 2.6 | 3.2 | 0.6 | 34.7 | 54.1 | 31,837 |
| Jämtland | N | 84.7 | 1.6 | 87,337 | 44.9 | 13.3 | 6.7 | 16.8 | 4.6 | 5.0 | 4.6 | 3.3 | 0.6 | 49.5 | 41.5 | 7,015 |
| Jönköping | G | 88.6 | 3.7 | 200,393 | 34.8 | 18.8 | 7.4 | 11.0 | 16.8 | 5.2 | 2.8 | 2.5 | 0.8 | 37.6 | 53.9 | 32,683 |
| Kalmar | G | 87.2 | 2.9 | 158,445 | 39.6 | 18.2 | 5.8 | 14.4 | 7.9 | 6.9 | 3.8 | 2.7 | 0.6 | 43.4 | 46.4 | 4,671 |
| Kopparberg | S | 84.8 | 3.3 | 183,087 | 41.8 | 16.0 | 7.4 | 11.6 | 6.8 | 7.2 | 4.7 | 3.3 | 1.2 | 46.5 | 41.8 | 8,589 |
| Kristianstad | G | 85.4 | 3.4 | 183,783 | 34.9 | 24.4 | 7.1 | 10.3 | 7.4 | 8.3 | 2.2 | 2.5 | 2.9 | 37.1 | 49.2 | 22,124 |
| Kronoberg | G | 87.7 | 2.1 | 114,359 | 34.5 | 19.5 | 6.8 | 14.9 | 8.8 | 7.5 | 3.9 | 3.1 | 1.1 | 38.3 | 50.0 | 13,288 |
| Malmö area | G | 86.0 | 5.4 | 296,481 | 36.8 | 30.1 | 8.9 | 3.3 | 5.3 | 5.9 | 3.6 | 3.6 | 2.4 | 40.4 | 47.7 | 21,743 |
| Malmöhus | G | 88.0 | 3.7 | 199,992 | 35.4 | 28.0 | 7.3 | 8.0 | 5.5 | 7.0 | 1.8 | 2.4 | 4.6 | 37.2 | 48.8 | 23,385 |
| Norrbotten | N | 85.3 | 3.1 | 167,424 | 55.5 | 11.0 | 6.9 | 7.3 | 4.6 | 2.8 | 9.1 | 2.4 | 0.6 | 64.5 | 29.8 | 58,187 |
| Skaraborg | G | 87.5 | 3.3 | 178,912 | 34.1 | 20.0 | 7.6 | 12.9 | 10.5 | 8.2 | 3.5 | 2.8 | 0.5 | 37.7 | 50.9 | 23,712 |
| Stockholm | S | 85.7 | 7.9 | 433,200 | 29.8 | 30.7 | 11.4 | 2.9 | 4.9 | 6.8 | 7.1 | 5.3 | 1.0 | 36.9 | 50.0 | 56,476 |
| Stockholm County | S | 87.6 | 10.6 | 579,256 | 29.9 | 32.1 | 12.0 | 4.2 | 5.1 | 8.1 | 4.1 | 3.9 | 0.5 | 34.0 | 53.4 | 112,667 |
| Södermanland | S | 87.2 | 3.0 | 162,051 | 44.0 | 18.3 | 9.0 | 8.0 | 6.2 | 7.2 | 3.8 | 2.9 | 0.7 | 47.7 | 41.5 | 10,196 |
| Uppsala | S | 87.0 | 3.1 | 167,283 | 35.3 | 22.0 | 11.2 | 9.0 | 5.8 | 7.5 | 4.5 | 4.3 | 0.4 | 39.8 | 48.1 | 13,848 |
| Värmland | S | 86.4 | 3.4 | 184,819 | 42.9 | 17.9 | 7.5 | 10.7 | 6.3 | 7.0 | 4.6 | 2.6 | 0.5 | 47.5 | 42.4 | 9,352 |
| Västerbotten | N | 86.4 | 3.0 | 161,448 | 45.3 | 10.8 | 9.9 | 12.6 | 8.6 | 3.9 | 5.4 | 3.3 | 0.2 | 50.7 | 41.9 | 14,174 |
| Västernorrland | N | 86.8 | 3.2 | 173,566 | 47.9 | 13.0 | 7.3 | 11.3 | 7.1 | 4.7 | 5.1 | 3.1 | 0.5 | 53.0 | 38.7 | 24,822 |
| Västmanland | S | 85.9 | 3.0 | 162,451 | 44.1 | 17.7 | 9.7 | 6.9 | 6.4 | 7.5 | 4.4 | 2.8 | 0.5 | 48.5 | 40.7 | 12,741 |
| Älvsborg N | G | 87.9 | 3.0 | 165,501 | 35.9 | 19.1 | 9.2 | 11.0 | 9.3 | 7.9 | 4.1 | 3.2 | 0.4 | 40.0 | 48.5 | 14,111 |
| Älvsborg S | G | 88.5 | 2.1 | 117,475 | 37.2 | 20.5 | 8.2 | 11.5 | 9.7 | 6.1 | 3.3 | 2.8 | 0.7 | 40.5 | 49.9 | 11,072 |
| Örebro | S | 86.9 | 3.2 | 177,453 | 43.5 | 15.7 | 9.4 | 7.8 | 8.3 | 6.7 | 5.2 | 2.8 | 0.6 | 48.7 | 41.2 | 13,280 |
| Östergötland | G | 87.3 | 4.8 | 261,387 | 38.8 | 21.1 | 8.3 | 8.3 | 8.8 | 6.6 | 4.0 | 3.0 | 1.1 | 42.8 | 46.6 | 9,872 |
| Total | | 86.7 | 100.0 | 5,470,761 | 37.7 | 21.9 | 9.1 | 8.5 | 7.1 | 6.7 | 4.5 | 3.4 | 1.0 | 42.2 | 46.7 | 244,610 |
Source: SCB

=== By votes ===
| Constituency | Land | Turnout | Share | Votes | S | M | FP | C | KDS | NyD | V | MP | Other | Left | Right | Margin |
| Constituency | | % | % | | | | | | | | | | | | | |
|---|---|---|---|---|---|---|---|---|---|---|---|---|---|---|---|---|
| Blekinge | G | 87.5 | 1.8 | 99,208 | 45,679 | 17,986 | 7,403 | 8,975 | 6,170 | 4,601 | 4,114 | 2,808 | 1,472 | 49,793 | 40,534 | 9,259 |
| Bohuslän | G | 87.6 | 3.6 | 195,856 | 65,706 | 43,195 | 22,662 | 16,221 | 17,081 | 15,514 | 7,741 | 6,908 | 828 | 73,447 | 99,159 | 25,712 |
| Gothenburg | G | 85.7 | 4.9 | 270,406 | 89,658 | 67,603 | 32,743 | 8,508 | 19,733 | 19,198 | 18,454 | 12,251 | 2,258 | 108,112 | 128,587 | 20,475 |
| Gotland | G | 85.9 | 0.7 | 36,458 | 13,208 | 6,105 | 2,421 | 7,532 | 1,830 | 2,350 | 1,374 | 1,556 | 82 | 14,582 | 17,888 | 3,306 |
| Gävleborg | N | 85.3 | 3.4 | 188,011 | 88,175 | 23,992 | 14,763 | 20,145 | 11,458 | 11,240 | 10,940 | 6,343 | 955 | 99,115 | 70,358 | 28,757 |
| Halland | G | 88.2 | 3.0 | 164,719 | 52,920 | 39,975 | 15,004 | 22,554 | 11,540 | 12,200 | 4,316 | 5,299 | 911 | 57,236 | 89,073 | 31,837 |
| Jämtland | N | 84.7 | 1.6 | 87,337 | 39,201 | 11,641 | 5,849 | 14,699 | 4,054 | 4,379 | 4,057 | 2,912 | 545 | 43,258 | 36,243 | 7,015 |
| Jönköping | G | 88.6 | 3.7 | 200,393 | 69,823 | 37,680 | 14,756 | 22,032 | 33,637 | 10,378 | 5,599 | 4,951 | 1,537 | 75,422 | 108,105 | 32,683 |
| Kalmar | G | 87.2 | 2.9 | 158,445 | 62,692 | 28,905 | 9,269 | 22,839 | 12,449 | 10,979 | 6,099 | 4,297 | 916 | 68,791 | 73,462 | 4,671 |
| Kopparberg | S | 84.8 | 3.3 | 183,087 | 76,566 | 29,372 | 13,504 | 21,297 | 12,371 | 13,247 | 8,567 | 5,986 | 2,177 | 85,133 | 76,544 | 8,589 |
| Kristianstad | G | 85.4 | 3.4 | 183,783 | 64,166 | 44,869 | 13,010 | 18,881 | 13,613 | 15,209 | 4,083 | 4,570 | 5,382 | 68,249 | 90,373 | 22,124 |
| Kronoberg | G | 87.7 | 2.1 | 114,359 | 39,430 | 22,277 | 7,769 | 16,994 | 10,091 | 8,594 | 4,413 | 3,555 | 1,236 | 43,843 | 57,131 | 13,288 |
| Malmö area | G | 86.0 | 5.4 | 296,481 | 109,133 | 89,308 | 26,512 | 9,845 | 15,768 | 17,545 | 10,557 | 10,762 | 7,051 | 119,690 | 141,433 | 21,743 |
| Malmöhus | G | 88.0 | 3.7 | 199,992 | 70,790 | 56,044 | 14,686 | 15,904 | 11,053 | 13,925 | 3,512 | 4,828 | 9,250 | 74,302 | 97,687 | 23,385 |
| Norrbotten | N | 85.3 | 3.1 | 167,424 | 92,882 | 18,377 | 11,581 | 12,239 | 7,664 | 4,651 | 15,166 | 3,942 | 922 | 108,048 | 49,861 | 58,187 |
| Skaraborg | G | 87.5 | 3.3 | 178,912 | 61,063 | 35,732 | 13,623 | 22,998 | 18,727 | 14,597 | 6,305 | 5,015 | 852 | 67,368 | 91,080 | 23,712 |
| Stockholm | S | 85.7 | 7.9 | 433,200 | 129,108 | 133,141 | 49,510 | 12,656 | 21,233 | 29,485 | 30,956 | 22,979 | 4,132 | 160,064 | 216,540 | 56,476 |
| Stockholm County | S | 87.6 | 10.6 | 579,256 | 173,268 | 185,968 | 69,408 | 24,571 | 29,548 | 47,045 | 23,560 | 22,833 | 3,055 | 196,828 | 309,495 | 112,667 |
| Södermanland | S | 87.2 | 3.0 | 162,051 | 71,285 | 29,722 | 14,587 | 12,903 | 9,970 | 11,625 | 6,093 | 4,777 | 1,089 | 77,378 | 67,182 | 10,196 |
| Uppsala | S | 87.0 | 3.1 | 167,283 | 58,981 | 36,878 | 18,771 | 15,107 | 9,633 | 12,496 | 7,560 | 7,257 | 600 | 66,541 | 80,389 | 13,848 |
| Värmland | S | 86.4 | 3.4 | 184,819 | 79,199 | 33,124 | 13,851 | 19,833 | 11,585 | 12,944 | 8,546 | 4,862 | 875 | 87,745 | 78,393 | 9,352 |
| Västerbotten | N | 86.4 | 3.0 | 161,448 | 73,103 | 17,514 | 15,974 | 20,333 | 13,882 | 6,221 | 8,774 | 5,250 | 397 | 81,877 | 67,703 | 14,174 |
| Västernorrland | N | 86.8 | 3.2 | 173,566 | 83,224 | 22,543 | 12,741 | 19,612 | 12,287 | 8,205 | 8,781 | 5,346 | 827 | 92,005 | 67,183 | 24,822 |
| Västmanland | S | 85.9 | 3.0 | 162,451 | 71,610 | 28,776 | 15,734 | 11,135 | 10,399 | 12,221 | 7,175 | 4,530 | 871 | 78,785 | 66,044 | 12,741 |
| Älvsborg N | G | 87.9 | 3.0 | 165,501 | 59,476 | 31,559 | 15,164 | 18,242 | 15,375 | 13,056 | 6,753 | 5,284 | 592 | 66,229 | 80,340 | 14,111 |
| Älvsborg S | G | 88.5 | 2.1 | 117,475 | 43,710 | 24,109 | 9,641 | 13,507 | 11,390 | 7,174 | 3,865 | 3,259 | 820 | 47,575 | 58,647 | 11,072 |
| Örebro | S | 86.9 | 3.2 | 177,453 | 77,241 | 27,803 | 16,725 | 13,875 | 14,753 | 11,897 | 9,195 | 4,916 | 1,048 | 86,436 | 73,156 | 13,280 |
| Östergötland | G | 87.3 | 4.8 | 261,387 | 101,464 | 55,196 | 21,695 | 21,738 | 23,057 | 17,305 | 10,350 | 7,775 | 2,807 | 111,814 | 121,686 | 9,872 |
| Total | | 86.7 | 100.0 | 5,470,761 | 2,062,761 | 1,199,394 | 499,356 | 465,175 | 390,351 | 368,281 | 246,905 | 185,051 | 53,487 | 2,309,666 | 2,554,276 | 244,610 |
Source: SCB

== Municipal summary ==
| Location | County | Turnout | Votes | S | M | FP | C | KDS | NyD | V | MP | Other | Left | Right |
|---|---|---|---|---|---|---|---|---|---|---|---|---|---|---|
| Ale | Älvsborg | 89.0 | 15,002 | 39.4 | 18.8 | 8.8 | 8.5 | 7.4 | 8.6 | 5.4 | 2.9 | 0.3 | 44.8 | 43.5 |
| Alingsås | Älvsborg | 89.7 | 22,026 | 32.8 | 19.7 | 11.0 | 8.5 | 12.4 | 7.0 | 4.4 | 4.0 | 0.3 | 37.1 | 51.6 |
| Alvesta | Kronoberg | 87.8 | 12,464 | 34.5 | 17.3 | 4.9 | 18.4 | 9.0 | 8.3 | 3.6 | 2.8 | 1.3 | 38.1 | 49.5 |
| Arboga | Västmanland | 86.3 | 9,499 | 45.3 | 17.2 | 8.8 | 8.4 | 6.7 | 5.3 | 4.2 | 3.5 | 0.6 | 49.5 | 41.1 |
| Aneby | Jönköping | 89.4 | 4,544 | 27.1 | 15.0 | 5.9 | 16.6 | 24.1 | 6.7 | 1.5 | 2.8 | 0.4 | 28.7 | 61.5 |
| Arjeplog | Norrbotten | 82.6 | 2,383 | 48.9 | 9.8 | 5.6 | 11.8 | 5.5 | 5.1 | 11.0 | 2.2 | 0.1 | 59.9 | 32.7 |
| Arvidsjaur | Norrbotten | 85.0 | 5,331 | 55.9 | 9.0 | 6.3 | 9.3 | 5.1 | 3.0 | 9.7 | 1.1 | 0.6 | 65.5 | 29.7 |
| Arvika | Värmland | 84.2 | 17,113 | 40.7 | 16.7 | 7.8 | 11.7 | 7.1 | 6.6 | 5.5 | 3.2 | 0.7 | 46.2 | 43.3 |
| Askersund | Örebro | 86.8 | 7,769 | 43.8 | 14.8 | 6.2 | 13.1 | 9.5 | 6.6 | 3.2 | 2.3 | 0.6 | 46.9 | 43.6 |
| Avesta | Kopparberg | 85.9 | 16,034 | 50.1 | 11.8 | 5.7 | 11.6 | 5.7 | 5.9 | 6.1 | 2.4 | 0.7 | 56.3 | 34.7 |
| Bengtsfors | Älvsborg | 85.0 | 7,530 | 39.3 | 14.9 | 6.4 | 16.1 | 10.2 | 7.3 | 3.3 | 2.3 | 0.3 | 42.5 | 47.6 |
| Berg | Jämtland | 82.6 | 5,512 | 40.7 | 10.6 | 3.7 | 27.8 | 4.7 | 6.3 | 3.4 | 2.5 | 0.3 | 44.1 | 46.8 |
| Bjurholm | Västerbotten | 86.1 | 2,000 | 34.8 | 14.1 | 14.9 | 18.9 | 10.0 | 2.5 | 1.7 | 1.8 | 1.6 | 36.5 | 57.8 |
| Bjuv | Malmöhus | 86.5 | 8,366 | 47.8 | 20.0 | 6.2 | 6.4 | 4.4 | 6.7 | 3.0 | 1.4 | 4.1 | 50.8 | 37.0 |
| Boden | Norrbotten | 87.1 | 19,618 | 54.7 | 14.1 | 7.2 | 6.7 | 5.0 | 3.1 | 6.8 | 2.3 | 0.1 | 61.5 | 33.0 |
| Bollnäs | Gävleborg | 85.0 | 18,199 | 41.6 | 12.8 | 7.6 | 14.6 | 6.7 | 5.9 | 6.2 | 3.9 | 0.5 | 47.9 | 41.8 |
| Borgholm | Kalmar | 86.0 | 7,536 | 24.6 | 19.9 | 4.1 | 28.4 | 9.0 | 7.5 | 2.3 | 3.6 | 0.5 | 26.9 | 61.5 |
| Borlänge | Kopparberg | 85.4 | 29,639 | 47.3 | 15.2 | 7.7 | 8.0 | 5.9 | 6.4 | 5.3 | 3.2 | 1.1 | 52.6 | 36.7 |
| Borås | Älvsborg | 88.0 | 66,074 | 39.2 | 22.0 | 8.9 | 7.2 | 9.5 | 5.7 | 3.8 | 2.7 | 0.9 | 43.0 | 47.6 |
| Botkyrka | Stockholm | 83.8 | 33,449 | 36.8 | 25.7 | 10.9 | 3.6 | 5.4 | 8.2 | 5.2 | 3.7 | 0.5 | 42.0 | 45.6 |
| Boxholm | Östergötland | 88.1 | 3,727 | 50.2 | 10.2 | 4.0 | 14.5 | 8.6 | 5.0 | 4.8 | 2.3 | 0.3 | 55.1 | 37.3 |
| Bromölla | Kristianstad | 86.4 | 7,809 | 56.8 | 12.9 | 5.4 | 5.4 | 4.0 | 6.9 | 4.7 | 2.4 | 1.5 | 61.4 | 27.7 |
| Bräcke | Jämtland | 83.9 | 5,500 | 52.8 | 10.5 | 4.4 | 16.5 | 2.9 | 4.8 | 5.1 | 2.4 | 0.5 | 58.0 | 34.3 |
| Burlöv | Malmöhus | 88.5 | 8,980 | 45.1 | 24.6 | 7.8 | 3.3 | 4.0 | 7.0 | 2.8 | 2.5 | 3.0 | 47.9 | 39.7 |
| Båstad | Kristianstad | 87.3 | 9,077 | 16.4 | 36.2 | 8.5 | 17.0 | 7.5 | 9.7 | 0.8 | 2.9 | 0.9 | 17.2 | 69.3 |
| Dals-Ed | Älvsborg | 84.1 | 3,311 | 25.0 | 15.8 | 5.9 | 24.8 | 14.6 | 8.1 | 2.0 | 3.3 | 0.6 | 27.0 | 61.1 |
| Danderyd | Stockholm | 93.0 | 18,836 | 12.2 | 54.0 | 13.3 | 2.6 | 5.4 | 7.2 | 1.5 | 3.5 | 0.2 | 13.7 | 75.3 |
| Degerfors | Örebro | 89.7 | 7,691 | 59.7 | 8.6 | 5.4 | 6.4 | 4.9 | 5.3 | 7.4 | 2.1 | 0.2 | 67.1 | 25.3 |
| Dorotea | Västerbotten | 83.4 | 2,418 | 51.4 | 6.4 | 7.2 | 15.3 | 4.3 | 4.8 | 8.6 | 1.7 | 0.4 | 60.0 | 33.1 |
| Eda | Värmland | 84.9 | 5,505 | 45.2 | 13.3 | 5.4 | 15.8 | 6.4 | 6.9 | 4.5 | 2.0 | 0.5 | 49.7 | 41.0 |
| Ekerö | Stockholm | 91.2 | 11,944 | 21.8 | 35.4 | 13.6 | 6.8 | 5.2 | 8.8 | 2.8 | 5.3 | 0.4 | 24.5 | 61.0 |
| Eksjö | Jönköping | 87.6 | 11,840 | 29.8 | 20.0 | 7.4 | 16.4 | 15.6 | 5.4 | 2.2 | 2.7 | 0.5 | 32.0 | 59.4 |
| Emmaboda | Kalmar | 88.2 | 7,072 | 43.9 | 13.9 | 4.6 | 18.1 | 6.6 | 6.0 | 3.3 | 3.0 | 0.5 | 47.2 | 43.3 |
| Enköping | Uppsala | 85.8 | 21,948 | 36.5 | 22.6 | 8.4 | 13.6 | 6.1 | 7.2 | 2.7 | 2.8 | 0.2 | 39.1 | 50.6 |
| Eskilstuna | Södermanland | 85.3 | 54,763 | 46.4 | 17.5 | 9.8 | 5.7 | 5.9 | 7.2 | 4.0 | 2.7 | 0.9 | 50.3 | 38.9 |
| Eslöv | Malmöhus | 85.7 | 17,662 | 40.6 | 22.8 | 5.6 | 12.2 | 4.9 | 6.9 | 1.8 | 2.1 | 3.0 | 42.4 | 45.5 |
| Essunga | Skaraborg | 87.6 | 3,860 | 23.0 | 22.0 | 6.8 | 23.2 | 9.4 | 11.0 | 2.1 | 2.1 | 0.4 | 25.1 | 61.5 |
| Fagersta | Västmanland | 86.0 | 8,837 | 56.0 | 13.4 | 6.8 | 4.4 | 5.2 | 6.3 | 4.8 | 2.1 | 0.9 | 60.9 | 29.8 |
| Falkenberg | Halland | 88.3 | 24,335 | 32.5 | 19.9 | 6.8 | 20.3 | 7.5 | 6.9 | 2.4 | 3.2 | 0.4 | 34.9 | 54.5 |
| Falköping | Skaraborg | 88.4 | 21,444 | 30.4 | 22.1 | 6.1 | 15.0 | 11.9 | 7.6 | 3.9 | 2.7 | 0.2 | 34.3 | 55.2 |
| Falun | Kopparberg | 84.6 | 33,704 | 34.2 | 21.9 | 9.9 | 10.3 | 7.4 | 6.7 | 3.8 | 3.9 | 1.9 | 37.9 | 49.6 |
| Filipstad | Värmland | 84.5 | 8,666 | 57.1 | 13.7 | 5.2 | 5.8 | 4.1 | 5.2 | 6.1 | 2.2 | 0.6 | 63.2 | 28.7 |
| Finspång | Östergötland | 89.1 | 15,095 | 50.7 | 12.3 | 6.6 | 7.5 | 8.3 | 6.4 | 5.1 | 2.8 | 0.4 | 55.8 | 34.7 |
| Flen | Södermanland | 87.0 | 10,765 | 45.4 | 15.6 | 7.0 | 11.8 | 6.4 | 6.1 | 4.1 | 3.1 | 0.4 | 49.5 | 40.8 |
| Forshaga | Värmland | 88.3 | 7,624 | 49.1 | 15.1 | 7.5 | 9.6 | 5.2 | 7.2 | 3.8 | 2.3 | 0.4 | 52.8 | 37.4 |
| Färgelanda | Älvsborg | 86.8 | 4,746 | 33.9 | 15.1 | 6.8 | 21.9 | 7.6 | 9.7 | 2.3 | 2.3 | 0.4 | 36.2 | 51.4 |
| Gagnef | Kopparberg | 86.2 | 6,452 | 38.3 | 13.6 | 5.9 | 17.3 | 8.9 | 6.9 | 3.1 | 4.7 | 1.3 | 41.4 | 45.6 |
| Gislaved | Jönköping | 88.4 | 17,684 | 35.5 | 19.3 | 8.4 | 15.2 | 11.0 | 5.8 | 2.1 | 2.1 | 0.6 | 37.6 | 53.8 |
| Gnesta | Södermanland | 86.4 | 5,564 | 33.8 | 19.4 | 7.8 | 15.1 | 6.0 | 9.3 | 3.7 | 4.4 | 0.5 | 37.5 | 48.4 |
| Gnosjö | Jönköping | 89.6 | 5,873 | 29.7 | 19.3 | 7.4 | 10.4 | 22.3 | 6.7 | 1.9 | 1.2 | 1.0 | 31.6 | 59.5 |
| Gothenburg | Gothenburg | 85.7 | 270,406 | 33.2 | 25.0 | 12.1 | 3.1 | 7.3 | 7.1 | 6.8 | 4.5 | 0.8 | 40.0 | 47.6 |
| Gotland | Gotland | 85.9 | 36,458 | 36.2 | 16.7 | 6.6 | 20.7 | 5.0 | 6.4 | 3.8 | 4.3 | 0.2 | 40.0 | 49.1 |
| Grums | Värmland | 86.3 | 6,596 | 52.9 | 11.7 | 4.2 | 10.3 | 5.0 | 9.2 | 4.9 | 1.6 | 0.2 | 57.7 | 31.2 |
| Grästorp | Skaraborg | 87.5 | 3,902 | 23.8 | 23.7 | 6.6 | 20.6 | 10.0 | 10.3 | 2.3 | 2.6 | 0.3 | 26.0 | 60.8 |
| Gullspång | Skaraborg | 85.4 | 4,074 | 37.8 | 16.1 | 5.6 | 15.0 | 8.5 | 9.0 | 4.5 | 3.2 | 0.4 | 42.3 | 45.2 |
| Gällivare | Norrbotten | 79.2 | 13,510 | 55.5 | 11.0 | 5.0 | 4.0 | 3.2 | 2.4 | 15.6 | 2.2 | 1.0 | 71.1 | 23.3 |
| Gävle | Gävleborg | 86.0 | 58,242 | 47.1 | 16.1 | 10.4 | 5.2 | 5.6 | 6.4 | 5.0 | 3.4 | 0.7 | 52.1 | 37.4 |
| Götene | Skaraborg | 88.9 | 8,651 | 33.9 | 17.7 | 7.5 | 14.4 | 11.6 | 8.3 | 3.7 | 2.6 | 0.3 | 37.6 | 51.2 |
| Habo | Skaraborg | 89.8 | 5,785 | 28.8 | 20.9 | 7.7 | 9.0 | 20.1 | 7.7 | 2.2 | 2.9 | 0.6 | 31.0 | 57.8 |
| Hallsberg | Örebro | 87.2 | 10,796 | 47.1 | 11.7 | 7.3 | 10.4 | 8.3 | 7.0 | 5.5 | 2.1 | 0.7 | 52.6 | 37.6 |
| Hallstahammar | Västmanland | 86.4 | 10,177 | 55.0 | 12.3 | 7.5 | 4.5 | 4.7 | 7.8 | 5.6 | 1.8 | 0.9 | 60.6 | 29.0 |
| Halmstad | Halland | 87.4 | 51,817 | 38.3 | 23.8 | 9.2 | 8.3 | 6.4 | 6.6 | 3.2 | 3.4 | 0.7 | 41.5 | 47.7 |
| Hagfors | Värmland | 87.3 | 11,025 | 59.3 | 9.2 | 3.7 | 9.3 | 3.7 | 4.7 | 7.9 | 1.8 | 0.3 | 67.2 | 26.0 |
| Hammarö | Värmland | 89.9 | 8,625 | 47.1 | 19.8 | 9.4 | 4.8 | 4.6 | 6.3 | 4.7 | 2.8 | 0.5 | 51.9 | 38.5 |
| Haninge | Stockholm | 86.4 | 35,450 | 34.7 | 27.3 | 11.6 | 4.1 | 4.3 | 9.3 | 4.7 | 3.4 | 0.7 | 39.4 | 47.3 |
| Haparanda | Norrbotten | 77.6 | 4,832 | 52.2 | 14.6 | 4.1 | 16.0 | 3.4 | 2.2 | 5.0 | 1.9 | 0.6 | 57.2 | 38.1 |
| Heby | Västmanland | 85.4 | 8,449 | 38.2 | 12.4 | 5.3 | 20.2 | 8.9 | 8.7 | 3.7 | 2.4 | 0.2 | 41.9 | 46.7 |
| Hedemora | Kopparberg | 86.2 | 10,677 | 43.1 | 14.3 | 6.3 | 13.2 | 6.5 | 5.9 | 5.5 | 3.8 | 1.3 | 48.6 | 40.3 |
| Helsingborg | Malmöhus | 85.0 | 69,198 | 35.8 | 28.0 | 8.9 | 3.9 | 7.1 | 7.2 | 2.9 | 2.9 | 3.2 | 38.7 | 48.0 |
| Herrljunga | Älvsborg | 89.6 | 6,304 | 26.9 | 18.5 | 7.1 | 20.0 | 13.9 | 7.7 | 3.0 | 2.8 | 0.3 | 29.9 | 59.4 |
| Hjo | Skaraborg | 87.6 | 5,912 | 33.4 | 21.5 | 7.8 | 10.9 | 12.8 | 7.8 | 2.5 | 3.1 | 0.3 | 35.9 | 53.0 |
| Hofors | Gävleborg | 85.8 | 7,565 | 60.8 | 9.1 | 5.5 | 5.9 | 3.3 | 3.4 | 9.2 | 2.2 | 0.7 | 69.9 | 23.8 |
| Huddinge | Stockholm | 86.6 | 41,558 | 31.4 | 29.7 | 11.7 | 3.3 | 4.7 | 9.9 | 5.0 | 3.7 | 0.6 | 36.4 | 49.3 |
| Hudiksvall | Gävleborg | 83.5 | 24,104 | 39.9 | 11.6 | 6.5 | 16.7 | 7.4 | 6.5 | 6.6 | 4.6 | 0.3 | 46.4 | 42.1 |
| Hultsfred | Kalmar | 86.4 | 10,964 | 42.0 | 14.4 | 4.9 | 17.3 | 10.0 | 5.3 | 4.2 | 1.6 | 0.3 | 46.2 | 46.6 |
| Hylte | Halland | 86.2 | 6,952 | 37.1 | 15.3 | 6.4 | 21.4 | 8.7 | 5.7 | 1.6 | 3.4 | 0.4 | 38.7 | 51.8 |
| Håbo | Uppsala | 88.1 | 8,971 | 30.6 | 34.3 | 9.1 | 5.1 | 4.4 | 11.1 | 3.1 | 2.1 | 0.3 | 33.6 | 52.9 |
| Hällefors | Örebro | 83.4 | 5,892 | 59.0 | 10.6 | 5.0 | 6.4 | 4.2 | 5.1 | 7.0 | 2.4 | 0.3 | 65.9 | 26.3 |
| Härjedalen | Jämtland | 83.0 | 8,059 | 51.2 | 12.1 | 5.5 | 12.8 | 3.0 | 6.2 | 4.9 | 2.7 | 1.7 | 56.1 | 33.4 |
| Härnösand | Västernorrland | 86.8 | 18,293 | 38.4 | 19.4 | 7.6 | 12.8 | 7.1 | 5.8 | 4.4 | 4.2 | 0.4 | 42.7 | 46.8 |
| Härryda | Bohuslän | 89.6 | 16,606 | 30.2 | 25.6 | 13.6 | 6.4 | 7.3 | 8.3 | 4.0 | 4.3 | 0.3 | 34.2 | 53.0 |
| Hässleholm | Kristianstad | 86.2 | 31,653 | 33.0 | 22.2 | 6.5 | 12.5 | 9.7 | 7.8 | 2.2 | 2.5 | 3.6 | 35.2 | 50.8 |
| Höganäs | Malmöhus | 88.3 | 14,950 | 31.1 | 31.7 | 8.7 | 5.9 | 8.5 | 6.6 | 2.2 | 3.1 | 2.2 | 33.3 | 54.8 |
| Högsby | Kalmar | 87.1 | 4,676 | 40.7 | 13.5 | 3.4 | 18.0 | 9.4 | 7.2 | 5.1 | 2.0 | 0.8 | 45.7 | 44.2 |
| Hörby | Malmöhus | 85.0 | 8,645 | 24.3 | 21.0 | 6.6 | 18.0 | 9.7 | 10.4 | 1.5 | 2.5 | 6.1 | 25.8 | 55.2 |
| Höör | Malmöhus | 85.6 | 7,999 | 27.2 | 26.3 | 7.4 | 12.4 | 8.0 | 10.4 | 1.7 | 3.8 | 2.9 | 28.9 | 54.0 |
| Jokkmokk | Norrbotten | 82.0 | 4,214 | 54.1 | 12.1 | 7.7 | 4.5 | 3.7 | 3.6 | 10.6 | 3.6 | 0.2 | 64.7 | 28.0 |
| Järfälla | Stockholm | 89.6 | 34,964 | 30.9 | 30.8 | 13.5 | 2.8 | 5.8 | 7.5 | 4.2 | 3.8 | 0.7 | 35.1 | 52.9 |
| Jönköping | Jönköping | 88.9 | 73,196 | 36.5 | 20.0 | 8.2 | 6.6 | 17.1 | 4.7 | 3.3 | 2.7 | 0.9 | 39.8 | 51.9 |
| Kalix | Norrbotten | 86.4 | 12,375 | 62.4 | 8.8 | 6.0 | 8.7 | 3.3 | 2.1 | 6.2 | 2.2 | 0.5 | 68.6 | 26.7 |
| Kalmar | Kalmar | 87.8 | 37,479 | 39.2 | 22.7 | 7.6 | 8.9 | 7.1 | 6.9 | 3.5 | 3.4 | 0.7 | 42.7 | 46.3 |
| Karlsborg | Skaraborg | 88.9 | 5,466 | 37.5 | 20.3 | 7.3 | 12.4 | 9.8 | 6.9 | 2.6 | 2.7 | 0.4 | 40.1 | 49.8 |
| Karlshamn | Blekinge | 87.2 | 20,900 | 49.4 | 15.9 | 6.9 | 7.3 | 6.0 | 4.3 | 5.2 | 3.3 | 1.8 | 54.6 | 36.0 |
| Karlskoga | Örebro | 87.1 | 22,473 | 49.9 | 17.5 | 8.8 | 4.0 | 5.7 | 6.8 | 5.3 | 1.8 | 0.2 | 55.2 | 36.0 |
| Karlskrona | Blekinge | 88.2 | 39,576 | 42.3 | 20.1 | 8.6 | 9.2 | 6.9 | 4.7 | 4.0 | 2.7 | 1.5 | 46.3 | 44.8 |
| Karlstad | Värmland | 87.5 | 51,742 | 37.5 | 23.7 | 9.5 | 7.2 | 7.0 | 7.0 | 4.2 | 3.3 | 0.6 | 41.7 | 47.4 |
| Katrineholm | Södermanland | 88.3 | 21,255 | 47.8 | 15.5 | 8.3 | 9.4 | 6.7 | 4.9 | 3.5 | 3.1 | 0.6 | 51.4 | 40.0 |
| Kil | Värmland | 87.7 | 7,715 | 36.4 | 20.2 | 7.9 | 11.8 | 8.1 | 8.5 | 3.7 | 3.0 | 0.4 | 40.1 | 48.0 |
| Kinda | Östergötland | 86.1 | 6,698 | 32.2 | 16.1 | 5.7 | 20.4 | 13.3 | 6.3 | 2.9 | 2.5 | 0.4 | 35.2 | 55.6 |
| Kiruna | Norrbotten | 80.1 | 15,373 | 58.2 | 9.9 | 5.8 | 2.9 | 3.5 | 2.8 | 14.1 | 1.9 | 0.8 | 72.3 | 22.1 |
| Klippan | Kristianstad | 82.3 | 9,944 | 33.5 | 25.8 | 6.1 | 11.3 | 6.8 | 8.6 | 2.3 | 2.4 | 3.2 | 35.8 | 50.0 |
| Kramfors | Västernorrland | 87.7 | 16,752 | 52.2 | 10.3 | 3.6 | 14.9 | 6.3 | 3.2 | 6.7 | 2.6 | 0.2 | 58.9 | 35.1 |
| Kristianstad | Kristianstad | 85.7 | 46,516 | 38.2 | 24.6 | 8.6 | 7.5 | 6.2 | 7.9 | 2.4 | 2.5 | 2.1 | 40.7 | 46.9 |
| Kristinehamn | Värmland | 86.3 | 17,061 | 45.0 | 16.1 | 9.0 | 7.8 | 6.2 | 8.3 | 4.7 | 2.5 | 0.4 | 49.8 | 39.0 |
| Krokom | Jämtland | 84.8 | 8,861 | 42.1 | 12.2 | 5.2 | 21.9 | 5.6 | 4.7 | 4.2 | 3.8 | 0.3 | 46.3 | 44.9 |
| Kumla | Örebro | 88.1 | 12,111 | 43.0 | 15.0 | 8.3 | 9.6 | 9.8 | 7.0 | 5.0 | 2.0 | 0.4 | 47.9 | 42.7 |
| Kungsbacka | Halland | 90.8 | 35,808 | 22.0 | 34.0 | 13.0 | 9.4 | 6.8 | 9.3 | 2.1 | 3.0 | 0.4 | 24.1 | 63.2 |
| Kungsör | Västmanland | 87.2 | 5,370 | 43.2 | 16.8 | 9.9 | 9.5 | 5.5 | 7.0 | 4.3 | 3.7 | 0.2 | 47.5 | 41.6 |
| Kungälv | Bohuslän | 90.2 | 22,430 | 33.1 | 23.2 | 10.4 | 9.5 | 8.1 | 7.4 | 4.1 | 3.5 | 0.6 | 37.2 | 51.2 |
| Kävlinge | Malmöhus | 89.6 | 14,637 | 40.2 | 26.4 | 8.1 | 6.8 | 4.2 | 7.6 | 2.0 | 2.4 | 2.5 | 42.1 | 45.4 |
| Köping | Västmanland | 84.9 | 16,164 | 48.5 | 14.7 | 7.5 | 8.1 | 6.7 | 5.9 | 5.5 | 2.7 | 0.4 | 54.1 | 37.0 |
| Laholm | Halland | 86.1 | 14,203 | 27.1 | 22.8 | 6.5 | 22.1 | 6.6 | 8.6 | 1.9 | 3.4 | 1.0 | 29.0 | 58.0 |
| Landskrona | Malmöhus | 85.9 | 22,912 | 45.3 | 26.3 | 6.6 | 4.4 | 4.2 | 6.0 | 3.0 | 2.0 | 2.4 | 48.2 | 41.4 |
| Laxå | Örebro | 85.2 | 4,715 | 48.1 | 10.2 | 8.3 | 9.2 | 9.4 | 6.7 | 5.2 | 2.2 | 0.7 | 53.4 | 37.1 |
| Leksand | Kopparberg | 85.7 | 9,690 | 31.9 | 18.2 | 8.2 | 15.1 | 11.8 | 7.4 | 3.1 | 3.4 | 0.9 | 35.0 | 53.3 |
| Lerum | Älvsborg | 91.1 | 20,981 | 26.7 | 27.4 | 13.2 | 5.8 | 9.7 | 8.3 | 4.1 | 4.5 | 0.4 | 30.8 | 56.1 |
| Lessebo | Kronoberg | 89.5 | 5,773 | 49.8 | 13.6 | 5.7 | 10.4 | 5.0 | 5.5 | 6.5 | 2.5 | 0.9 | 56.3 | 34.8 |
| Lidingö | Stockholm | 90.7 | 25,394 | 16.5 | 46.8 | 14.5 | 3.0 | 5.2 | 7.5 | 2.2 | 4.1 | 0.3 | 18.7 | 69.4 |
| Lidköping | Skaraborg | 87.5 | 23,772 | 37.5 | 18.1 | 8.4 | 12.0 | 8.6 | 7.2 | 5.3 | 2.7 | 0.3 | 42.8 | 47.0 |
| Lilla Edet | Älvsborg | 86.1 | 7,626 | 41.6 | 14.4 | 6.8 | 13.2 | 6.6 | 9.2 | 5.3 | 2.6 | 0.5 | 46.9 | 40.9 |
| Lindesberg | Örebro | 85.9 | 15,756 | 43.3 | 13.7 | 7.5 | 12.3 | 8.5 | 6.6 | 4.6 | 3.0 | 0.5 | 47.9 | 42.0 |
| Linköping | Östergötland | 88.3 | 81,554 | 32.9 | 24.9 | 10.8 | 6.9 | 9.8 | 6.2 | 4.0 | 3.5 | 1.0 | 36.9 | 52.4 |
| Ljungby | Kronoberg | 86.9 | 17,530 | 32.9 | 16.8 | 6.3 | 16.5 | 11.8 | 9.2 | 3.1 | 2.9 | 0.5 | 36.0 | 51.4 |
| Ljusdal | Gävleborg | 81.8 | 13,397 | 43.8 | 11.2 | 7.9 | 15.2 | 6.2 | 6.0 | 6.7 | 2.8 | 0.2 | 50.5 | 40.5 |
| Ljusnarsberg | Örebro | 83.6 | 4,099 | 49.5 | 10.2 | 5.7 | 8.9 | 5.1 | 8.5 | 8.6 | 2.9 | 0.7 | 58.1 | 29.8 |
| Lomma | Malmöhus | 92.6 | 11,563 | 28.4 | 38.2 | 11.0 | 4.2 | 5.7 | 6.2 | 1.1 | 2.9 | 2.3 | 29.5 | 59.1 |
| Ludvika | Kopparberg | 85.0 | 18,880 | 53.5 | 12.1 | 6.1 | 6.2 | 5.2 | 6.6 | 6.7 | 2.6 | 1.1 | 60.1 | 29.5 |
| Luleå | Norrbotten | 87.1 | 44,767 | 51.1 | 13.8 | 9.7 | 6.2 | 4.8 | 3.0 | 7.8 | 3.3 | 0.3 | 58.9 | 34.5 |
| Lund | Malmöhus | 89.8 | 56,230 | 28.8 | 28.3 | 13.9 | 5.1 | 5.4 | 4.3 | 5.4 | 7.0 | 1.8 | 34.2 | 52.7 |
| Lycksele | Västerbotten | 84.8 | 8,934 | 47.4 | 10.0 | 9.8 | 8.5 | 12.7 | 3.4 | 6.2 | 1.8 | 0.3 | 53.6 | 41.0 |
| Lysekil | Bohuslän | 87.8 | 9,881 | 48.0 | 15.8 | 10.5 | 5.8 | 5.6 | 6.8 | 4.1 | 3.1 | 0.3 | 52.1 | 37.7 |
| Malmö | Malmöhus | 85.2 | 148,141 | 39.0 | 32.4 | 7.4 | 2.2 | 4.6 | 5.9 | 3.3 | 3.0 | 2.2 | 42.3 | 46.6 |
| Malung | Kopparberg | 87.5 | 7,819 | 41.6 | 17.1 | 8.2 | 14.4 | 5.1 | 7.4 | 3.3 | 2.2 | 0.9 | 44.8 | 44.7 |
| Malå | Västerbotten | 84.7 | 2,578 | 53.6 | 9.7 | 9.2 | 8.5 | 8.3 | 2.6 | 6.3 | 1.5 | 0.3 | 60.0 | 35.7 |
| Mariestad | Skaraborg | 86.0 | 15,943 | 38.4 | 19.7 | 7.3 | 9.3 | 9.4 | 8.1 | 4.1 | 3.1 | 0.5 | 42.6 | 45.7 |
| Mark | Älvsborg | 89.3 | 21,343 | 40.7 | 17.0 | 6.3 | 14.3 | 8.9 | 6.1 | 3.5 | 2.7 | 0.5 | 44.2 | 46.5 |
| Markaryd | Kronoberg | 85.5 | 6,705 | 36.8 | 16.9 | 5.0 | 13.0 | 10.9 | 9.2 | 3.4 | 2.4 | 2.4 | 40.2 | 45.8 |
| Mellerud | Älvsborg | 86.5 | 6,783 | 29.3 | 17.6 | 5.8 | 22.5 | 10.1 | 9.3 | 2.2 | 3.1 | 0.2 | 31.5 | 56.0 |
| Mjölby | Östergötland | 86.9 | 16,908 | 41.9 | 17.9 | 7.1 | 10.4 | 9.4 | 7.2 | 3.5 | 2.1 | 0.6 | 45.4 | 44.7 |
| Mora | Kopparberg | 81.1 | 12,492 | 34.3 | 18.2 | 7.4 | 14.8 | 6.7 | 10.3 | 3.4 | 3.9 | 1.1 | 37.6 | 47.1 |
| Motala | Östergötland | 86.8 | 26,835 | 47.9 | 16.1 | 8.2 | 7.1 | 7.1 | 6.0 | 4.1 | 2.5 | 0.9 | 52.0 | 38.5 |
| Mullsjö | Skaraborg | 90.9 | 4,535 | 28.1 | 19.0 | 7.4 | 10.1 | 21.3 | 7.3 | 2.7 | 3.4 | 0.6 | 30.8 | 57.9 |
| Munkedal | Bohuslän | 84.3 | 6,930 | 34.8 | 15.9 | 6.6 | 18.1 | 9.1 | 9.7 | 3.2 | 2.5 | 0.1 | 38.0 | 49.7 |
| Munkfors | Värmland | 88.2 | 3,326 | 63.0 | 7.8 | 5.4 | 8.7 | 3.2 | 3.5 | 6.1 | 1.6 | 0.7 | 69.1 | 25.1 |
| Mölndal | Bohuslän | 88.6 | 33,448 | 33.1 | 24.1 | 13.8 | 5.2 | 7.5 | 7.0 | 4.9 | 3.6 | 0.7 | 38.0 | 50.6 |
| Mönsterås | Kalmar | 87.5 | 8,730 | 42.8 | 14.8 | 4.4 | 14.9 | 8.2 | 7.4 | 4.8 | 2.2 | 0.6 | 47.6 | 42.3 |
| Mörbylånga | Kalmar | 88.9 | 8,812 | 31.7 | 21.1 | 6.4 | 19.2 | 6.4 | 8.8 | 2.6 | 3.0 | 0.7 | 34.4 | 53.2 |
| Nacka | Stockholm | 88.3 | 38,763 | 26.5 | 36.1 | 13.3 | 2.7 | 4.3 | 7.8 | 4.3 | 4.5 | 0.4 | 30.8 | 56.5 |
| Nora | Örebro | 86.0 | 6,585 | 42.2 | 15.6 | 8.1 | 9.1 | 7.6 | 7.8 | 5.6 | 3.4 | 0.6 | 47.8 | 40.3 |
| Norberg | Västmanland | 86.6 | 4,177 | 53.2 | 11.9 | 5.4 | 6.9 | 3.6 | 5.8 | 9.3 | 3.4 | 0.7 | 62.5 | 27.7 |
| Nordanstig | Gävleborg | 83.8 | 7,273 | 38.9 | 8.9 | 6.2 | 21.8 | 8.5 | 5.7 | 5.4 | 4.5 | 0.2 | 44.2 | 45.2 |
| Nordmaling | Västerbotten | 85.9 | 5,150 | 44.8 | 11.6 | 7.4 | 17.2 | 9.9 | 4.5 | 3.0 | 1.5 | 0.1 | 47.8 | 46.0 |
| Norrköping | Östergötland | 85.7 | 76,036 | 39.6 | 23.6 | 7.6 | 5.7 | 7.4 | 7.2 | 4.4 | 2.9 | 1.6 | 43.9 | 44.3 |
| Norrtälje | Stockholm | 86.0 | 29,455 | 34.5 | 23.3 | 8.3 | 13.2 | 5.4 | 7.8 | 3.5 | 3.1 | 0.8 | 38.0 | 50.3 |
| Norsjö | Västerbotten | 83.5 | 3,365 | 45.8 | 7.1 | 9.3 | 17.8 | 7.9 | 3.0 | 5.9 | 2.3 | 1.0 | 51.7 | 42.1 |
| Nybro | Kalmar | 87.6 | 13,786 | 42.5 | 16.1 | 4.5 | 15.7 | 7.9 | 7.1 | 3.6 | 2.0 | 0.5 | 46.1 | 44.3 |
| Nyköping | Södermanland | 89.5 | 32,093 | 42.5 | 19.5 | 8.2 | 9.0 | 6.6 | 7.3 | 3.4 | 2.8 | 0.7 | 45.9 | 43.4 |
| Nynäshamn | Stockholm | 87.8 | 14,200 | 40.8 | 22.5 | 8.6 | 5.5 | 4.4 | 8.1 | 5.2 | 3.9 | 1.0 | 46.0 | 41.0 |
| Nässjö | Jönköping | 89.1 | 20,775 | 39.3 | 16.5 | 6.4 | 11.4 | 14.9 | 4.8 | 3.3 | 2.7 | 0.7 | 42.6 | 49.2 |
| Ockelbo | Gävleborg | 84.8 | 4,219 | 47.4 | 11.3 | 4.5 | 17.2 | 5.9 | 5.3 | 5.3 | 2.7 | 0.4 | 52.7 | 38.9 |
| Olofström | Blekinge | 85.1 | 9,076 | 51.8 | 13.5 | 6.8 | 9.2 | 6.7 | 3.6 | 4.6 | 3.0 | 0.8 | 56.4 | 36.2 |
| Orsa | Kopparberg | 83.0 | 4,624 | 35.2 | 14.3 | 7.4 | 14.4 | 7.8 | 10.3 | 5.4 | 4.7 | 0.7 | 40.5 | 43.8 |
| Orust | Bohuslän | 86.7 | 9,027 | 30.0 | 20.1 | 11.4 | 14.0 | 8.1 | 9.1 | 3.7 | 3.4 | 0.1 | 33.7 | 53.6 |
| Osby | Kristianstad | 85.7 | 8,686 | 40.8 | 15.7 | 5.7 | 11.9 | 9.0 | 10.0 | 3.1 | 2.4 | 1.4 | 43.9 | 42.3 |
| Oskarshamn | Kalmar | 87.8 | 17,982 | 43.4 | 17.9 | 6.3 | 8.1 | 9.8 | 6.7 | 4.5 | 2.4 | 0.9 | 47.9 | 42.1 |
| Ovanåker | Gävleborg | 87.3 | 8,943 | 38.4 | 9.7 | 6.6 | 20.9 | 12.6 | 5.0 | 3.6 | 3.0 | 0.3 | 42.0 | 49.7 |
| Oxelösund | Södermanland | 87.8 | 8,183 | 54.6 | 13.0 | 6.4 | 3.8 | 3.9 | 8.7 | 6.4 | 2.5 | 0.9 | 61.0 | 27.0 |
| Pajala | Norrbotten | 81.8 | 5,192 | 50.1 | 8.1 | 4.4 | 8.4 | 4.8 | 2.8 | 18.6 | 1.3 | 1.4 | 68.8 | 25.7 |
| Partille | Bohuslän | 88.9 | 19,494 | 30.0 | 25.8 | 14.0 | 4.2 | 8.6 | 8.6 | 4.7 | 3.6 | 0.4 | 34.7 | 52.7 |
| Perstorp | Kristianstad | 84.8 | 4,398 | 38.5 | 21.3 | 7.0 | 10.0 | 7.8 | 8.7 | 1.9 | 2.0 | 3.0 | 40.4 | 46.0 |
| Piteå | Norrbotten | 89.9 | 26,887 | 60.6 | 7.6 | 6.2 | 8.4 | 6.0 | 2.5 | 5.8 | 1.9 | 0.9 | 66.3 | 28.3 |
| Ragunda | Jämtland | 84.6 | 4,590 | 51.5 | 8.5 | 3.2 | 19.2 | 4.3 | 4.4 | 4.6 | 2.8 | 1.5 | 56.1 | 35.2 |
| Robertsfors | Västerbotten | 87.6 | 4,926 | 36.0 | 9.5 | 8.0 | 28.2 | 9.4 | 3.4 | 3.3 | 2.1 | 0.2 | 39.3 | 55.0 |
| Ronneby | Blekinge | 87.8 | 19,245 | 47.3 | 17.1 | 6.8 | 11.3 | 5.0 | 4.6 | 3.8 | 2.6 | 1.5 | 51.1 | 40.2 |
| Rättvik | Kopparberg | 80.5 | 7,096 | 33.1 | 18.5 | 8.2 | 13.6 | 8.4 | 10.3 | 2.9 | 3.6 | 1.5 | 36.0 | 48.7 |
| Sala | Västmanland | 86.7 | 14,078 | 35.2 | 16.1 | 8.5 | 14.9 | 8.3 | 10.1 | 3.4 | 3.0 | 0.3 | 38.6 | 47.9 |
| Salem | Stockholm | 88.6 | 7,426 | 28.3 | 30.2 | 13.7 | 4.5 | 6.1 | 8.3 | 3.8 | 4.7 | 0.5 | 32.1 | 54.4 |
| Sandviken | Gävleborg | 87.3 | 26,575 | 54.0 | 11.8 | 6.9 | 7.3 | 4.5 | 6.6 | 5.8 | 2.6 | 0.4 | 59.9 | 30.5 |
| Sigtuna | Stockholm | 85.1 | 18,158 | 32.8 | 30.0 | 11.0 | 5.5 | 5.3 | 8.4 | 3.3 | 3.3 | 0.4 | 36.1 | 51.8 |
| Simrishamn | Kristianstad | 83.3 | 12,933 | 34.5 | 24.6 | 6.6 | 11.2 | 6.0 | 6.8 | 2.1 | 2.9 | 5.3 | 36.6 | 48.4 |
| Sjöbo | Malmöhus | 85.1 | 10,259 | 28.0 | 19.8 | 4.1 | 6.9 | 4.5 | 6.3 | 1.3 | 2.5 | 26.5 | 29.3 | 35.4 |
| Skara | Skaraborg | 87.6 | 12,200 | 34.6 | 21.2 | 8.4 | 11.8 | 8.5 | 7.9 | 3.1 | 4.0 | 0.4 | 37.7 | 50.0 |
| Skinnskatteberg | Västmanland | 86.5 | 3,218 | 52.9 | 11.4 | 5.6 | 8.6 | 5.1 | 6.2 | 6.8 | 2.9 | 0.5 | 59.7 | 30.7 |
| Skellefteå | Västerbotten | 87.2 | 49,170 | 50.6 | 8.9 | 9.0 | 13.1 | 8.3 | 2.8 | 4.8 | 2.3 | 0.2 | 55.4 | 39.4 |
| Skurup | Malmöhus | 85.9 | 8,395 | 32.6 | 23.2 | 6.6 | 13.0 | 5.0 | 7.1 | 1.8 | 2.1 | 8.7 | 34.4 | 47.8 |
| Skövde | Skaraborg | 86.8 | 30,035 | 36.5 | 20.5 | 9.2 | 9.9 | 9.2 | 7.7 | 3.2 | 2.8 | 0.9 | 39.7 | 48.9 |
| Smedjebacken | Kopparberg | 85.6 | 8,324 | 52.6 | 11.3 | 5.4 | 9.2 | 4.6 | 7.1 | 6.3 | 2.7 | 0.9 | 59.0 | 30.4 |
| Sollefteå | Västernorrland | 87.6 | 16,751 | 55.5 | 11.2 | 4.0 | 11.5 | 5.3 | 3.5 | 5.7 | 3.1 | 0.4 | 61.2 | 31.9 |
| Sollentuna | Stockholm | 90.1 | 31,633 | 25.8 | 33.3 | 13.9 | 3.6 | 6.8 | 7.8 | 3.6 | 4.7 | 0.6 | 29.4 | 57.5 |
| Solna | Stockholm | 85.2 | 35,680 | 29.9 | 33.3 | 11.9 | 2.7 | 5.1 | 7.0 | 5.3 | 4.2 | 0.6 | 35.2 | 53.0 |
| Sorsele | Västerbotten | 79.4 | 2,164 | 42.2 | 10.4 | 7.3 | 14.7 | 12.3 | 3.7 | 6.3 | 2.8 | 0.2 | 48.5 | 44.8 |
| Sotenäs | Bohuslän | 86.3 | 6,351 | 38.4 | 19.9 | 13.0 | 7.9 | 7.8 | 6.8 | 3.0 | 3.0 | 0.2 | 41.4 | 48.6 |
| Staffanstorp | Malmöhus | 90.5 | 11,236 | 32.5 | 33.4 | 10.0 | 6.4 | 4.8 | 6.1 | 1.4 | 2.5 | 2.7 | 34.0 | 54.8 |
| Stenungsund | Bohuslän | 87.3 | 11,550 | 31.2 | 24.7 | 11.4 | 8.8 | 7.8 | 9.2 | 3.1 | 3.5 | 0.4 | 34.3 | 52.7 |
| Stockholm | Stockholm | 85.7 | 433,200 | 29.8 | 30.7 | 11.4 | 2.9 | 4.9 | 6.8 | 7.1 | 5.3 | 1.0 | 36.9 | 50.0 |
| Storfors | Värmland | 88.1 | 3,327 | 53.3 | 12.3 | 6.0 | 9.3 | 4.6 | 7.5 | 5.5 | 1.3 | 0.3 | 58.9 | 32.1 |
| Storuman | Västerbotten | 81.6 | 4,827 | 38.7 | 13.1 | 10.0 | 10.4 | 13.4 | 6.4 | 5.1 | 2.7 | 0.2 | 43.8 | 46.9 |
| Strängnäs | Södermanland | 87.5 | 17,207 | 34.9 | 25.2 | 11.9 | 7.2 | 6.2 | 8.2 | 2.9 | 3.1 | 0.4 | 37.8 | 50.5 |
| Strömstad | Bohuslän | 82.7 | 6,263 | 35.6 | 20.0 | 9.9 | 14.0 | 6.2 | 6.8 | 3.3 | 4.1 | 0.1 | 38.9 | 50.1 |
| Strömsund | Jämtland | 84.7 | 10,462 | 53.5 | 7.9 | 4.9 | 17.3 | 4.1 | 3.9 | 5.5 | 2.4 | 0.5 | 59.0 | 34.2 |
| Sundbyberg | Stockholm | 85.2 | 19,392 | 38.1 | 25.0 | 10.9 | 2.9 | 4.4 | 7.3 | 6.8 | 3.8 | 0.7 | 45.0 | 43.2 |
| Sundsvall | Västernorrland | 86.4 | 62,015 | 45.5 | 15.2 | 9.7 | 8.5 | 6.3 | 5.3 | 5.4 | 3.5 | 0.7 | 50.9 | 39.7 |
| Sunne | Värmland | 85.2 | 8,967 | 31.1 | 20.0 | 6.4 | 23.2 | 7.7 | 6.6 | 2.1 | 2.5 | 0.4 | 33.2 | 57.3 |
| Surahammar | Västmanland | 86.3 | 6,658 | 58.3 | 10.7 | 6.5 | 3.7 | 4.6 | 7.1 | 6.2 | 2.3 | 0.6 | 64.5 | 25.5 |
| Svalöv | Malmöhus | 86.5 | 7,869 | 37.6 | 21.3 | 6.1 | 15.5 | 6.1 | 7.6 | 1.7 | 2.4 | 1.7 | 39.3 | 49.0 |
| Svedala | Malmöhus | 90.0 | 10,766 | 39.9 | 26.6 | 7.2 | 6.6 | 5.8 | 6.6 | 1.8 | 2.5 | 2.9 | 41.7 | 46.3 |
| Svenljunga | Älvsborg | 87.3 | 7,117 | 30.3 | 20.5 | 8.1 | 20.3 | 9.0 | 7.1 | 1.7 | 2.7 | 0.4 | 32.0 | 57.9 |
| Säffle | Värmland | 85.4 | 11,817 | 37.5 | 17.6 | 5.8 | 17.2 | 7.6 | 9.0 | 3.0 | 1.9 | 0.4 | 40.5 | 48.2 |
| Säter | Kopparberg | 86.5 | 7,363 | 35.5 | 16.5 | 6.2 | 17.2 | 7.4 | 8.5 | 4.5 | 2.9 | 1.3 | 40.0 | 47.4 |
| Sävsjö | Jönköping | 87.0 | 7,651 | 25.9 | 19.1 | 5.1 | 17.7 | 22.0 | 5.6 | 2.2 | 1.8 | 0.6 | 28.1 | 64.0 |
| Söderhamn | Gävleborg | 85.3 | 19,494 | 53.7 | 11.0 | 6.2 | 9.5 | 4.7 | 5.0 | 6.4 | 2.9 | 0.6 | 60.1 | 31.4 |
| Söderköping | Östergötland | 87.7 | 8,455 | 30.1 | 23.1 | 6.7 | 15.6 | 8.3 | 8.7 | 2.6 | 3.7 | 0.3 | 32.6 | 53.8 |
| Södertälje | Stockholm | 83.9 | 45,204 | 40.3 | 22.9 | 9.6 | 5.3 | 5.0 | 7.9 | 4.3 | 4.1 | 0.6 | 44.6 | 42.8 |
| Sölvesborg | Blekinge | 87.0 | 10,411 | 46.1 | 21.0 | 6.3 | 7.6 | 6.1 | 6.2 | 2.8 | 2.8 | 1.1 | 48.9 | 41.0 |
| Tanum | Bohuslän | 83.9 | 7,493 | 23.9 | 21.8 | 10.4 | 20.2 | 7.3 | 9.8 | 2.3 | 4.0 | 0.3 | 26.2 | 59.6 |
| Tibro | Skaraborg | 87.1 | 7,152 | 35.9 | 17.4 | 9.4 | 10.3 | 12.5 | 8.2 | 3.1 | 2.2 | 1.0 | 39.0 | 49.7 |
| Tidaholm | Skaraborg | 88.8 | 8,705 | 43.6 | 15.0 | 7.3 | 12.1 | 8.7 | 7.4 | 3.6 | 1.9 | 0.3 | 47.2 | 43.1 |
| Tierp | Uppsala | 87.3 | 13,284 | 50.4 | 10.7 | 6.9 | 15.3 | 5.1 | 6.3 | 2.9 | 2.2 | 0.3 | 53.2 | 38.0 |
| Timrå | Västernorrland | 86.3 | 12,128 | 55.2 | 8.6 | 6.8 | 9.7 | 5.5 | 4.4 | 7.0 | 2.0 | 0.8 | 62.2 | 30.6 |
| Tingsryd | Kronoberg | 85.2 | 9,187 | 31.8 | 19.3 | 4.1 | 22.7 | 8.1 | 7.8 | 2.9 | 2.7 | 0.6 | 34.6 | 54.2 |
| Tjörn | Bohuslän | 87.7 | 8,779 | 23.7 | 23.0 | 14.0 | 6.4 | 17.5 | 10.1 | 2.1 | 2.9 | 0.3 | 25.8 | 60.9 |
| Tomelilla | Kristianstad | 81.9 | 7,740 | 31.7 | 21.7 | 5.0 | 14.9 | 4.7 | 7.6 | 1.5 | 2.3 | 10.5 | 33.2 | 46.4 |
| Torsby | Värmland | 84.6 | 9,811 | 45.5 | 17.0 | 4.7 | 14.7 | 4.2 | 5.2 | 6.3 | 2.3 | 0.2 | 51.8 | 40.6 |
| Torsås | Kalmar | 85.4 | 5,098 | 31.9 | 17.0 | 4.3 | 24.6 | 10.0 | 7.7 | 1.7 | 2.2 | 0.7 | 33.7 | 55.8 |
| Tranemo | Älvsborg | 90.0 | 7,962 | 35.7 | 18.9 | 7.7 | 19.0 | 8.5 | 5.9 | 1.7 | 2.3 | 0.3 | 37.5 | 54.0 |
| Tranås | Jönköping | 87.6 | 11,991 | 39.6 | 18.7 | 6.6 | 8.5 | 14.4 | 5.9 | 3.1 | 2.3 | 1.0 | 42.6 | 48.3 |
| Trelleborg | Malmöhus | 87.2 | 23,267 | 46.2 | 22.5 | 6.3 | 6.3 | 5.3 | 5.3 | 2.2 | 2.4 | 3.6 | 48.4 | 40.3 |
| Trollhättan | Älvsborg | 87.1 | 32,021 | 45.4 | 17.8 | 9.2 | 6.7 | 5.8 | 7.2 | 4.5 | 2.8 | 0.5 | 49.9 | 39.5 |
| Trosa | Södermanland | 88.4 | 5,879 | 32.5 | 26.8 | 10.7 | 8.4 | 4.8 | 9.6 | 3.1 | 3.5 | 0.4 | 35.6 | 50.8 |
| Tyresö | Stockholm | 88.9 | 20,573 | 30.5 | 31.8 | 11.9 | 3.3 | 4.7 | 8.2 | 5.0 | 4.1 | 0.5 | 35.5 | 51.7 |
| Täby | Stockholm | 91.5 | 36,003 | 18.1 | 45.0 | 14.9 | 3.2 | 5.2 | 7.4 | 2.0 | 3.9 | 0.4 | 20.0 | 68.3 |
| Töreboda | Skaraborg | 84.1 | 6,478 | 32.4 | 18.0 | 5.2 | 19.2 | 9.0 | 9.9 | 3.2 | 2.8 | 0.3 | 35.6 | 51.4 |
| Uddevalla | Bohuslän | 85.9 | 30,411 | 41.2 | 17.9 | 8.5 | 8.7 | 8.0 | 7.3 | 4.5 | 3.4 | 0.5 | 45.7 | 43.1 |
| Ulricehamn | Älvsborg | 89.0 | 14,979 | 27.5 | 19.8 | 8.5 | 18.1 | 12.6 | 7.6 | 2.1 | 3.4 | 0.4 | 29.7 | 59.0 |
| Umeå | Västerbotten | 87.7 | 58,377 | 42.0 | 13.3 | 11.4 | 9.6 | 7.5 | 4.6 | 6.2 | 5.1 | 0.2 | 48.3 | 41.8 |
| Upplands-Bro | Stockholm | 87.2 | 11,308 | 35.5 | 28.3 | 9.8 | 4.3 | 6.3 | 8.4 | 4.1 | 3.0 | 0.3 | 39.6 | 48.7 |
| Upplands Väsby | Stockholm | 86.8 | 20,267 | 33.3 | 28.8 | 12.6 | 3.3 | 5.0 | 8.3 | 4.4 | 3.7 | 0.4 | 38.0 | 49.6 |
| Uppsala | Uppsala | 87.2 | 103,605 | 31.0 | 23.8 | 13.3 | 7.1 | 6.2 | 7.4 | 5.4 | 5.5 | 0.4 | 36.3 | 50.4 |
| Uppvidinge | Kronoberg | 86.3 | 6,798 | 39.7 | 13.6 | 4.4 | 19.7 | 7.4 | 7.4 | 5.2 | 2.2 | 0.3 | 44.9 | 45.1 |
| Vadstena | Östergötland | 89.2 | 5,180 | 39.9 | 20.5 | 7.8 | 11.0 | 9.4 | 6.3 | 2.4 | 2.4 | 0.3 | 42.3 | 48.7 |
| Vaggeryd | Jönköping | 90.2 | 8,074 | 35.6 | 15.9 | 5.8 | 11.4 | 20.8 | 4.5 | 3.6 | 1.8 | 0.6 | 39.2 | 54.0 |
| Valdemarsvik | Östergötland | 87.5 | 5,736 | 41.8 | 16.7 | 4.7 | 16.4 | 6.8 | 7.1 | 2.9 | 2.2 | 1.3 | 44.7 | 44.7 |
| Vallentuna | Stockholm | 89.3 | 13,514 | 23.8 | 34.9 | 11.9 | 6.6 | 6.1 | 8.7 | 2.8 | 4.7 | 0.4 | 26.7 | 59.4 |
| Vansbro | Kopparberg | 83.7 | 5,068 | 42.0 | 12.9 | 5.3 | 17.7 | 8.5 | 6.8 | 4.3 | 1.7 | 0.7 | 46.4 | 44.4 |
| Vara | Skaraborg | 86.6 | 10,998 | 23.7 | 24.4 | 6.2 | 19.4 | 9.7 | 11.7 | 2.2 | 2.4 | 0.3 | 25.9 | 59.7 |
| Varberg | Halland | 88.0 | 31,604 | 34.4 | 20.1 | 8.1 | 16.8 | 7.7 | 6.7 | 2.9 | 3.0 | 0.4 | 37.3 | 52.7 |
| Vaxholm | Stockholm | 90.7 | 4,465 | 26.2 | 36.9 | 12.3 | 5.2 | 3.9 | 7.7 | 3.1 | 4.4 | 0.3 | 29.3 | 58.3 |
| Vellinge | Malmöhus | 92.9 | 18,792 | 20.9 | 49.6 | 8.8 | 3.9 | 5.1 | 7.6 | 0.7 | 1.9 | 1.6 | 21.6 | 67.3 |
| Vetlanda | Jönköping | 87.9 | 18,442 | 31.5 | 16.8 | 6.4 | 16.5 | 17.4 | 6.1 | 2.3 | 2.4 | 0.7 | 33.8 | 57.1 |
| Vilhelmina | Västerbotten | 82.6 | 5,235 | 46.9 | 7.5 | 10.2 | 12.0 | 8.8 | 4.7 | 7.1 | 2.7 | 0.1 | 53.9 | 38.5 |
| Vimmerby | Kalmar | 87.1 | 10,451 | 34.4 | 17.4 | 4.2 | 23.4 | 8.5 | 6.7 | 2.7 | 2.2 | 0.5 | 37.1 | 53.5 |
| Vindeln | Västerbotten | 84.2 | 4,233 | 35.9 | 11.9 | 10.7 | 19.5 | 12.2 | 4.7 | 2.8 | 2.2 | 0.0 | 38.7 | 54.3 |
| Vingåker | Södermanland | 87.7 | 6,342 | 46.5 | 13.1 | 7.1 | 11.9 | 7.5 | 6.7 | 3.3 | 3.7 | 0.2 | 49.8 | 39.6 |
| Vårgårda | Älvsborg | 89.4 | 6,583 | 24.6 | 18.0 | 8.2 | 16.7 | 18.7 | 7.7 | 2.7 | 3.0 | 0.3 | 27.3 | 61.7 |
| Vänersborg | Älvsborg | 86.6 | 23,879 | 36.1 | 18.6 | 9.2 | 11.4 | 8.5 | 8.3 | 4.5 | 3.3 | 0.3 | 40.6 | 47.6 |
| Vännäs | Västerbotten | 86.0 | 5,363 | 43.1 | 9.1 | 7.9 | 18.1 | 8.9 | 4.2 | 5.8 | 2.7 | 0.1 | 48.9 | 44.0 |
| Värmdö | Stockholm | 88.3 | 13,288 | 32.1 | 31.2 | 9.4 | 4.2 | 4.0 | 9.8 | 4.8 | 4.1 | 0.3 | 37.0 | 48.9 |
| Värnamo | Jönköping | 88.8 | 20,323 | 33.3 | 19.3 | 7.6 | 12.5 | 17.4 | 4.7 | 2.2 | 2.5 | 0.6 | 35.5 | 56.7 |
| Västervik | Kalmar | 85.8 | 25,859 | 43.0 | 17.1 | 6.6 | 11.7 | 6.1 | 6.9 | 5.3 | 3.0 | 0.3 | 48.3 | 41.5 |
| Västerås | Västmanland | 85.8 | 75,824 | 40.4 | 21.8 | 12.3 | 4.0 | 6.5 | 7.9 | 3.7 | 2.9 | 0.6 | 44.1 | 44.6 |
| Växjö | Kronoberg | 88.9 | 45,638 | 31.7 | 23.2 | 8.8 | 11.8 | 8.2 | 6.7 | 4.2 | 3.9 | 1.3 | 35.9 | 52.0 |
| Ydre | Östergötland | 89.5 | 2,856 | 26.5 | 14.8 | 6.1 | 22.7 | 17.0 | 6.7 | 2.5 | 3.0 | 0.6 | 29.0 | 60.6 |
| Ystad | Malmöhus | 86.2 | 16,606 | 37.7 | 26.2 | 6.7 | 8.3 | 4.4 | 6.5 | 1.7 | 2.2 | 6.3 | 39.4 | 45.6 |
| Åmål | Älvsborg | 85.1 | 8,709 | 42.8 | 17.5 | 7.3 | 12.2 | 8.0 | 6.9 | 3.0 | 2.0 | 0.3 | 45.8 | 45.0 |
| Ånge | Västernorrland | 83.3 | 8,155 | 48.2 | 10.0 | 4.1 | 15.9 | 5.3 | 5.5 | 6.5 | 4.0 | 0.7 | 54.7 | 35.2 |
| Åre | Jämtland | 85.5 | 6,379 | 36.3 | 14.7 | 7.2 | 20.8 | 5.3 | 6.9 | 3.9 | 4.2 | 0.5 | 40.2 | 48.1 |
| Årjäng | Värmland | 81.2 | 5,899 | 25.8 | 15.9 | 9.4 | 25.2 | 10.0 | 8.7 | 2.2 | 2.7 | 0.2 | 28.0 | 60.5 |
| Åsele | Västerbotten | 83.2 | 2,708 | 53.7 | 8.3 | 5.9 | 15.5 | 6.9 | 3.5 | 4.8 | 1.3 | 0.1 | 58.5 | 36.5 |
| Åstorp | Kristianstad | 85.4 | 7,699 | 40.3 | 26.2 | 5.4 | 7.3 | 6.6 | 7.8 | 1.7 | 1.4 | 3.3 | 42.0 | 45.5 |
| Åtvidaberg | Östergötland | 88.9 | 8,389 | 46.0 | 14.9 | 6.5 | 11.6 | 9.1 | 6.0 | 3.1 | 2.4 | 0.5 | 49.1 | 42.0 |
| Älmhult | Kronoberg | 86.9 | 10,264 | 38.3 | 19.3 | 6.7 | 14.9 | 8.6 | 6.9 | 2.6 | 1.9 | 0.8 | 40.9 | 49.4 |
| Älvdalen | Kopparberg | 82.3 | 5,225 | 40.0 | 14.6 | 6.1 | 17.6 | 5.0 | 9.0 | 3.8 | 3.2 | 0.6 | 43.9 | 43.4 |
| Älvkarleby | Uppsala | 88.1 | 6,043 | 63.6 | 8.5 | 6.8 | 4.1 | 3.0 | 6.5 | 5.1 | 1.8 | 0.7 | 68.6 | 22.3 |
| Älvsbyn | Norrbotten | 88.1 | 6,295 | 58.7 | 6.1 | 5.1 | 9.0 | 5.8 | 3.1 | 10.2 | 1.8 | 0.2 | 68.9 | 26.1 |
| Ängelholm | Kristianstad | 86.2 | 22,117 | 25.0 | 33.2 | 8.1 | 9.8 | 7.8 | 9.8 | 1.7 | 2.8 | 1.8 | 26.7 | 58.8 |
| Öckerö | Bohuslän | 89.9 | 7,193 | 25.2 | 23.8 | 11.3 | 3.3 | 22.9 | 7.1 | 2.2 | 3.9 | 0.2 | 27.5 | 61.3 |
| Ödeshög | Östergötland | 88.7 | 3,918 | 33.4 | 16.4 | 5.1 | 16.7 | 15.7 | 6.5 | 2.2 | 3.4 | 0.7 | 35.5 | 53.9 |
| Örebro | Örebro | 87.3 | 79,566 | 38.2 | 17.9 | 11.9 | 6.8 | 9.5 | 6.7 | 4.9 | 3.3 | 0.8 | 43.0 | 46.1 |
| Örkelljunga | Kristianstad | 84.8 | 5,849 | 22.7 | 27.9 | 6.8 | 12.2 | 15.1 | 9.1 | 1.1 | 2.5 | 2.5 | 23.9 | 62.0 |
| Örnsköldsvik | Västernorrland | 87.7 | 39,472 | 49.0 | 10.5 | 7.4 | 12.9 | 10.2 | 4.5 | 2.9 | 2.3 | 0.3 | 51.9 | 41.0 |
| Östersund | Jämtland | 85.4 | 37,974 | 41.9 | 16.5 | 8.9 | 13.9 | 5.1 | 4.8 | 4.7 | 3.8 | 0.5 | 46.6 | 44.4 |
| Österåker | Stockholm | 89.0 | 18,332 | 25.9 | 36.2 | 12.9 | 4.4 | 4.6 | 8.7 | 3.0 | 4.0 | 0.3 | 28.9 | 58.1 |
| Östhammar | Uppsala | 85.5 | 13,432 | 41.9 | 16.9 | 7.5 | 15.0 | 4.4 | 7.8 | 3.3 | 2.7 | 0.5 | 45.2 | 43.8 |
| Östra Göinge | Kristianstad | 86.3 | 9,362 | 48.5 | 14.8 | 5.2 | 9.0 | 6.9 | 8.3 | 3.2 | 1.9 | 2.2 | 51.8 | 35.9 |
| Överkalix | Norrbotten | 84.4 | 3,111 | 61.7 | 6.0 | 4.5 | 12.6 | 2.1 | 1.5 | 10.0 | 1.0 | 0.6 | 71.7 | 25.2 |
| Övertorneå | Norrbotten | 83.0 | 3,536 | 46.9 | 10.6 | 4.0 | 19.8 | 4.4 | 2.9 | 10.1 | 1.2 | 0.1 | 57.0 | 38.9 |
| Total | | 86.7 | 5,470,761 | 37.7 | 21.9 | 9.1 | 8.5 | 7.1 | 6.7 | 4.5 | 3.4 | 1.0 | 42.2 | 46.7 |
Source: SCB

== Municipal results ==
Votes by municipality. The municipalities are the color of the party that got the most votes within the coalition that won relative majority.

Cartogram of the map to the left with each municipality rescaled to the number of valid votes cast.

Map showing the voting shifts from the 1988 to the 1991 election. Darker blue indicates a municipality voted more towards the parties that formed the centre-right bloc. Darker red indicates a municipality voted more towards the parties that form the left-wing bloc.

Votes by municipality as a scale from red/Left-wing bloc to blue/Centre-right bloc.

Cartogram of vote with each municipality rescaled in proportion to number of valid votes cast. Deeper blue represents a relative majority for the centre-right coalition, brighter red represents a relative majority for the left-wing coalition.

=== Blekinge ===
| Location | Turnout | Share | Votes | S | M | FP | C | KDS | NyD | V | MP | Other | Left | Right |
|---|---|---|---|---|---|---|---|---|---|---|---|---|---|---|
| Karlshamn | 87.2 | 21.1 | 20,900 | 49.4 | 15.9 | 6.9 | 7.3 | 6.0 | 4.3 | 5.2 | 3.3 | 1.8 | 54.6 | 36.0 |
| Karlskrona | 88.2 | 39.9 | 39,576 | 42.3 | 20.1 | 8.6 | 9.2 | 6.9 | 4.7 | 4.0 | 2.7 | 1.5 | 46.3 | 44.8 |
| Olofström | 85.1 | 9.1 | 9,076 | 51.8 | 13.5 | 6.8 | 9.2 | 6.7 | 3.6 | 4.6 | 3.0 | 0.8 | 56.4 | 36.2 |
| Ronneby | 87.8 | 19.4 | 19,245 | 47.3 | 17.1 | 6.8 | 11.3 | 5.0 | 4.6 | 3.8 | 2.6 | 1.5 | 51.1 | 40.2 |
| Sölvesborg | 87.0 | 10.5 | 10,411 | 46.1 | 21.0 | 6.3 | 7.6 | 6.1 | 6.2 | 2.8 | 2.8 | 1.1 | 48.9 | 41.0 |
| Total | 87.5 | 1.8 | 99,208 | 46.0 | 18.1 | 7.5 | 9.0 | 6.2 | 4.6 | 4.1 | 2.8 | 1.5 | 50.2 | 40.9 |
Source: SCB

=== Dalarna ===
Kopparberg County

| Location | Turnout | Share | Votes | S | M | FP | C | KDS | NyD | V | MP | Other | Left | Right |
|---|---|---|---|---|---|---|---|---|---|---|---|---|---|---|
| Avesta | 85.9 | 8.8 | 16,034 | 50.1 | 11.8 | 5.7 | 11.6 | 5.7 | 5.9 | 6.1 | 2.4 | 0.7 | 56.3 | 34.7 |
| Borlänge | 85.4 | 16.2 | 29,639 | 47.3 | 15.2 | 7.7 | 8.0 | 5.9 | 6.4 | 5.3 | 3.2 | 1.1 | 52.6 | 36.7 |
| Falun | 84.6 | 18.4 | 33,704 | 34.2 | 21.9 | 9.9 | 10.3 | 7.4 | 6.7 | 3.8 | 3.9 | 1.9 | 37.9 | 49.6 |
| Gagnef | 86.2 | 3.5 | 6,452 | 38.3 | 13.6 | 5.9 | 17.3 | 8.9 | 6.9 | 3.1 | 4.7 | 1.3 | 41.4 | 45.6 |
| Hedemora | 86.2 | 5.8 | 10,677 | 43.1 | 14.3 | 6.3 | 13.2 | 6.5 | 5.9 | 5.5 | 3.8 | 1.3 | 48.6 | 40.3 |
| Leksand | 85.7 | 5.3 | 9,690 | 31.9 | 18.2 | 8.2 | 15.1 | 11.8 | 7.4 | 3.1 | 3.4 | 0.9 | 35.0 | 53.3 |
| Ludvika | 85.0 | 10.3 | 18,880 | 53.5 | 12.1 | 6.1 | 6.2 | 5.2 | 6.6 | 6.7 | 2.6 | 1.1 | 60.1 | 29.5 |
| Malung | 87.5 | 4.3 | 7,819 | 41.6 | 17.1 | 8.2 | 14.4 | 5.1 | 7.4 | 3.3 | 2.2 | 0.9 | 44.8 | 44.7 |
| Mora | 81.1 | 6.8 | 12,492 | 34.3 | 18.2 | 7.4 | 14.8 | 6.7 | 10.3 | 3.4 | 3.9 | 1.1 | 37.6 | 47.1 |
| Orsa | 83.0 | 2.5 | 4,624 | 35.2 | 14.3 | 7.4 | 14.4 | 7.8 | 10.3 | 5.4 | 4.7 | 0.7 | 40.5 | 43.8 |
| Rättvik | 80.5 | 3.9 | 7,096 | 33.1 | 18.5 | 8.2 | 13.6 | 8.4 | 10.3 | 2.9 | 3.6 | 1.5 | 36.0 | 48.7 |
| Smedjebacken | 85.6 | 4.5 | 8,324 | 52.6 | 11.3 | 5.4 | 9.2 | 4.6 | 7.1 | 6.3 | 2.7 | 0.9 | 59.0 | 30.4 |
| Säter | 86.5 | 4.0 | 7,363 | 35.5 | 16.5 | 6.2 | 17.2 | 7.4 | 8.5 | 4.5 | 2.9 | 1.3 | 40.0 | 47.4 |
| Vansbro | 83.7 | 2.8 | 5,068 | 42.0 | 12.9 | 5.3 | 17.7 | 8.5 | 6.8 | 4.3 | 1.7 | 0.7 | 46.4 | 44.4 |
| Älvdalen | 82.3 | 2.9 | 5,225 | 40.0 | 14.6 | 6.1 | 17.6 | 5.0 | 9.0 | 3.8 | 3.2 | 0.6 | 43.9 | 43.4 |
| Total | 84.8 | 3.3 | 183,087 | 41.8 | 16.0 | 7.4 | 11.6 | 6.8 | 7.2 | 4.7 | 3.3 | 1.2 | 46.5 | 41.8 |
Source: SCB

=== Gotland ===
| Location | Turnout | Share | Votes | S | M | FP | C | KDS | NyD | V | MP | Other | Left | Right |
|---|---|---|---|---|---|---|---|---|---|---|---|---|---|---|
| Gotland | 85.9 | 100.0 | 36,458 | 36.2 | 16.7 | 6.6 | 20.7 | 5.0 | 6.4 | 3.8 | 4.3 | 0.2 | 40.0 | 49.1 |
| Total | 85.9 | 0.7 | 36,458 | 36.2 | 16.7 | 6.6 | 20.7 | 5.0 | 6.4 | 3.8 | 4.3 | 0.2 | 40.0 | 49.1 |
Source: SCB

=== Gävleborg ===
| Location | Turnout | Share | Votes | S | M | FP | C | KDS | NyD | V | MP | Other | Left | Right |
|---|---|---|---|---|---|---|---|---|---|---|---|---|---|---|
| Bollnäs | 85.0 | 9.7 | 18,199 | 41.6 | 12.8 | 7.6 | 14.6 | 6.7 | 5.9 | 6.2 | 3.9 | 0.5 | 47.9 | 41.8 |
| Gävle | 86.0 | 31.0 | 58,242 | 47.1 | 16.1 | 10.4 | 5.2 | 5.6 | 6.4 | 5.0 | 3.4 | 0.7 | 52.1 | 37.4 |
| Hofors | 85.8 | 4.0 | 7,565 | 60.8 | 9.1 | 5.5 | 5.9 | 3.3 | 3.4 | 9.2 | 2.2 | 0.7 | 69.9 | 23.8 |
| Hudiksvall | 83.5 | 12.8 | 24,104 | 39.9 | 11.6 | 6.5 | 16.7 | 7.4 | 6.5 | 6.6 | 4.6 | 0.3 | 46.4 | 42.1 |
| Ljusdal | 81.8 | 7.1 | 13,397 | 43.8 | 11.2 | 7.9 | 15.2 | 6.2 | 6.0 | 6.7 | 2.8 | 0.2 | 50.5 | 40.5 |
| Nordanstig | 83.8 | 3.9 | 7,273 | 38.9 | 8.9 | 6.2 | 21.8 | 8.5 | 5.7 | 5.4 | 4.5 | 0.2 | 44.2 | 45.2 |
| Ockelbo | 84.8 | 2.2 | 4,219 | 47.4 | 11.3 | 4.5 | 17.2 | 5.9 | 5.3 | 5.3 | 2.7 | 0.4 | 52.7 | 38.9 |
| Ovanåker | 87.3 | 4.8 | 8,943 | 38.4 | 9.7 | 6.6 | 20.9 | 12.6 | 5.0 | 3.6 | 3.0 | 0.3 | 42.0 | 49.7 |
| Sandviken | 87.3 | 14.1 | 26,575 | 54.0 | 11.8 | 6.9 | 7.3 | 4.5 | 6.6 | 5.8 | 2.6 | 0.4 | 59.9 | 30.5 |
| Söderhamn | 85.3 | 10.4 | 19,494 | 53.7 | 11.0 | 6.2 | 9.5 | 4.7 | 5.0 | 6.4 | 2.9 | 0.6 | 60.1 | 31.4 |
| Total | 85.3 | 3.4 | 188,011 | 46.9 | 12.8 | 7.9 | 10.7 | 6.1 | 6.0 | 5.8 | 3.4 | 0.5 | 52.7 | 37.4 |
Source: SCB

=== Halland ===
| Location | Turnout | Share | Votes | S | M | FP | C | KDS | NyD | V | MP | Other | Left | Right |
|---|---|---|---|---|---|---|---|---|---|---|---|---|---|---|
| Falkenberg | 88.3 | 14.8 | 24,335 | 32.5 | 19.9 | 6.8 | 20.3 | 7.5 | 6.9 | 2.4 | 3.2 | 0.4 | 34.9 | 54.5 |
| Halmstad | 87.4 | 31.5 | 51,817 | 38.3 | 23.8 | 9.2 | 8.3 | 6.4 | 6.6 | 3.2 | 3.4 | 0.7 | 41.5 | 47.7 |
| Hylte | 86.2 | 4.2 | 6,952 | 37.1 | 15.3 | 6.4 | 21.4 | 8.7 | 5.7 | 1.6 | 3.4 | 0.4 | 38.7 | 51.8 |
| Kungsbacka | 90.8 | 21.7 | 35,808 | 22.0 | 34.0 | 13.0 | 9.4 | 6.8 | 9.3 | 2.1 | 3.0 | 0.4 | 24.1 | 63.2 |
| Laholm | 86.1 | 8.6 | 14,203 | 27.1 | 22.8 | 6.5 | 22.1 | 6.6 | 8.6 | 1.9 | 3.4 | 1.0 | 29.0 | 58.0 |
| Varberg | 88.0 | 19.2 | 31,604 | 34.4 | 20.1 | 8.1 | 16.8 | 7.7 | 6.7 | 2.9 | 3.0 | 0.4 | 37.3 | 52.7 |
| Total | 88.2 | 3.0 | 164,719 | 32.1 | 24.3 | 9.1 | 13.7 | 7.0 | 7.4 | 2.6 | 3.2 | 0.6 | 34.7 | 54.1 |
Source: SCB

=== Jämtland ===
| Location | Turnout | Share | Votes | S | M | FP | C | KDS | NyD | V | MP | Other | Left | Right |
|---|---|---|---|---|---|---|---|---|---|---|---|---|---|---|
| Berg | 82.6 | 6.3 | 5,512 | 40.7 | 10.6 | 3.7 | 27.8 | 4.7 | 6.3 | 3.4 | 2.5 | 0.3 | 44.1 | 46.8 |
| Bräcke | 83.9 | 6.3 | 5,500 | 52.8 | 10.5 | 4.4 | 16.5 | 2.9 | 4.8 | 5.1 | 2.4 | 0.5 | 58.0 | 34.3 |
| Härjedalen | 83.0 | 9.2 | 8,059 | 51.2 | 12.1 | 5.5 | 12.8 | 3.0 | 6.2 | 4.9 | 2.7 | 1.7 | 56.1 | 33.4 |
| Krokom | 84.8 | 10.1 | 8,861 | 42.1 | 12.2 | 5.2 | 21.9 | 5.6 | 4.7 | 4.2 | 3.8 | 0.3 | 46.3 | 44.9 |
| Ragunda | 84.6 | 5.3 | 4,590 | 51.5 | 8.5 | 3.2 | 19.2 | 4.3 | 4.4 | 4.6 | 2.8 | 1.5 | 56.1 | 35.2 |
| Strömsund | 84.7 | 12.0 | 10,462 | 53.5 | 7.9 | 4.9 | 17.3 | 4.1 | 3.9 | 5.5 | 2.4 | 0.5 | 59.0 | 34.2 |
| Åre | 85.5 | 7.3 | 6,379 | 36.3 | 14.7 | 7.2 | 20.8 | 5.3 | 6.9 | 3.9 | 4.2 | 0.5 | 40.2 | 48.1 |
| Östersund | 85.4 | 43.5 | 37,974 | 41.9 | 16.5 | 8.9 | 13.9 | 5.1 | 4.8 | 4.7 | 3.8 | 0.5 | 46.6 | 44.4 |
| Total | 84.7 | 1.6 | 87,337 | 44.9 | 13.3 | 6.7 | 16.8 | 4.6 | 5.0 | 4.6 | 3.3 | 0.6 | 49.5 | 41.5 |
Source: SCB

=== Jönköping ===
| Location | Turnout | Share | Votes | S | M | FP | C | KDS | NyD | V | MP | Other | Left | Right |
|---|---|---|---|---|---|---|---|---|---|---|---|---|---|---|
| Aneby | 89.4 | 2.3 | 4,544 | 27.1 | 15.0 | 5.9 | 16.6 | 24.1 | 6.7 | 1.5 | 2.8 | 0.4 | 28.7 | 61.5 |
| Eksjö | 87.6 | 5.9 | 11,840 | 29.8 | 20.0 | 7.4 | 16.4 | 15.6 | 5.4 | 2.2 | 2.7 | 0.5 | 32.0 | 59.4 |
| Gislaved | 88.4 | 8.8 | 17,684 | 35.5 | 19.3 | 8.4 | 15.2 | 11.0 | 5.8 | 2.1 | 2.1 | 0.6 | 37.6 | 53.8 |
| Gnosjö | 89.6 | 2.9 | 5,873 | 29.7 | 19.3 | 7.4 | 10.4 | 22.3 | 6.7 | 1.9 | 1.2 | 1.0 | 31.6 | 59.5 |
| Jönköping | 88.9 | 36.5 | 73,196 | 36.5 | 20.0 | 8.2 | 6.6 | 17.1 | 4.7 | 3.3 | 2.7 | 0.9 | 39.8 | 51.9 |
| Nässjö | 89.1 | 10.4 | 20,775 | 39.3 | 16.5 | 6.4 | 11.4 | 14.9 | 4.8 | 3.3 | 2.7 | 0.7 | 42.6 | 49.2 |
| Sävsjö | 87.0 | 3.8 | 7,651 | 25.9 | 19.1 | 5.1 | 17.7 | 22.0 | 5.6 | 2.2 | 1.8 | 0.6 | 28.1 | 64.0 |
| Tranås | 87.6 | 6.0 | 11,991 | 39.6 | 18.7 | 6.6 | 8.5 | 14.4 | 5.9 | 3.1 | 2.3 | 1.0 | 42.6 | 48.3 |
| Vaggeryd | 90.2 | 4.0 | 8,074 | 35.6 | 15.9 | 5.8 | 11.4 | 20.8 | 4.5 | 3.6 | 1.8 | 0.6 | 39.2 | 54.0 |
| Vetlanda | 87.9 | 9.2 | 18,442 | 31.5 | 16.8 | 6.4 | 16.5 | 17.4 | 6.1 | 2.3 | 2.4 | 0.7 | 33.8 | 57.1 |
| Värnamo | 88.8 | 10.1 | 20,323 | 33.3 | 19.3 | 7.6 | 12.5 | 17.4 | 4.7 | 2.2 | 2.5 | 0.6 | 35.5 | 56.7 |
| Total | 88.6 | 3.7 | 200,393 | 34.8 | 18.8 | 7.4 | 11.0 | 16.8 | 5.2 | 2.8 | 2.5 | 0.8 | 37.6 | 53.9 |
Source: SCB

=== Kalmar ===
| Location | Turnout | Share | Votes | S | M | FP | C | KDS | NyD | V | MP | Other | Left | Right |
|---|---|---|---|---|---|---|---|---|---|---|---|---|---|---|
| Borgholm | 86.0 | 4.8 | 7,536 | 24.6 | 19.9 | 4.1 | 28.4 | 9.0 | 7.5 | 2.3 | 3.6 | 0.5 | 26.9 | 61.5 |
| Emmaboda | 88.2 | 4.5 | 7,072 | 43.9 | 13.9 | 4.6 | 18.1 | 6.6 | 6.0 | 3.3 | 3.0 | 0.5 | 47.2 | 43.3 |
| Hultsfred | 86.4 | 6.9 | 10,964 | 42.0 | 14.4 | 4.9 | 17.3 | 10.0 | 5.3 | 4.2 | 1.6 | 0.3 | 46.2 | 46.6 |
| Högsby | 87.1 | 3.0 | 4,676 | 40.7 | 13.5 | 3.4 | 18.0 | 9.4 | 7.2 | 5.1 | 2.0 | 0.8 | 45.7 | 44.2 |
| Kalmar | 87.8 | 23.7 | 37,479 | 39.2 | 22.7 | 7.6 | 8.9 | 7.1 | 6.9 | 3.5 | 3.4 | 0.7 | 42.7 | 46.3 |
| Mönsterås | 87.5 | 5.5 | 8,730 | 42.8 | 14.8 | 4.4 | 14.9 | 8.2 | 7.4 | 4.8 | 2.2 | 0.6 | 47.6 | 42.3 |
| Mörbylånga | 88.9 | 5.6 | 8,812 | 31.7 | 21.1 | 6.4 | 19.2 | 6.4 | 8.8 | 2.6 | 3.0 | 0.7 | 34.4 | 53.2 |
| Nybro | 87.6 | 8.7 | 13,786 | 42.5 | 16.1 | 4.5 | 15.7 | 7.9 | 7.1 | 3.6 | 2.0 | 0.5 | 46.1 | 44.3 |
| Oskarshamn | 87.8 | 11.3 | 17,982 | 43.4 | 17.9 | 6.3 | 8.1 | 9.8 | 6.7 | 4.5 | 2.4 | 0.9 | 47.9 | 42.1 |
| Torsås | 85.4 | 3.2 | 5,098 | 31.9 | 17.0 | 4.3 | 24.6 | 10.0 | 7.7 | 1.7 | 2.2 | 0.7 | 33.7 | 55.8 |
| Vimmerby | 87.1 | 6.6 | 10,451 | 34.4 | 17.4 | 4.2 | 23.4 | 8.5 | 6.7 | 2.7 | 2.2 | 0.5 | 37.1 | 53.5 |
| Västervik | 85.8 | 16.3 | 25,859 | 43.0 | 17.1 | 6.6 | 11.7 | 6.1 | 6.9 | 5.3 | 3.0 | 0.3 | 48.3 | 41.5 |
| Total | 87.2 | 2.9 | 158,445 | 39.6 | 18.2 | 5.8 | 14.4 | 7.9 | 6.9 | 3.8 | 2.7 | 0.6 | 43.4 | 46.4 |
Source: SCB

=== Kronoberg ===
| Location | Turnout | Share | Votes | S | M | FP | C | KDS | NyD | V | MP | Other | Left | Right |
|---|---|---|---|---|---|---|---|---|---|---|---|---|---|---|
| Alvesta | 87.8 | 10.9 | 12,464 | 34.5 | 17.3 | 4.9 | 18.4 | 9.0 | 8.3 | 3.6 | 2.8 | 1.3 | 38.1 | 49.5 |
| Lessebo | 89.5 | 5.0 | 5,773 | 49.8 | 13.6 | 5.7 | 10.4 | 5.0 | 5.5 | 6.5 | 2.5 | 0.9 | 56.3 | 34.8 |
| Ljungby | 86.9 | 15.3 | 17,530 | 32.9 | 16.8 | 6.3 | 16.5 | 11.8 | 9.2 | 3.1 | 2.9 | 0.5 | 36.0 | 51.4 |
| Markaryd | 85.5 | 5.9 | 6,705 | 36.8 | 16.9 | 5.0 | 13.0 | 10.9 | 9.2 | 3.4 | 2.4 | 2.4 | 40.2 | 45.8 |
| Tingsryd | 85.2 | 8.0 | 9,187 | 31.8 | 19.3 | 4.1 | 22.7 | 8.1 | 7.8 | 2.9 | 2.7 | 0.6 | 34.6 | 54.2 |
| Uppvidinge | 86.3 | 5.9 | 6,798 | 39.7 | 13.6 | 4.4 | 19.7 | 7.4 | 7.4 | 5.2 | 2.2 | 0.3 | 44.9 | 45.1 |
| Växjö | 88.9 | 39.9 | 45,638 | 31.7 | 23.2 | 8.8 | 11.8 | 8.2 | 6.7 | 4.2 | 3.9 | 1.3 | 35.9 | 52.0 |
| Älmhult | 86.9 | 9.0 | 10,264 | 38.3 | 19.3 | 6.7 | 14.9 | 8.6 | 6.9 | 2.6 | 1.9 | 0.8 | 40.9 | 49.4 |
| Total | 87.7 | 2.1 | 114,359 | 34.5 | 19.5 | 6.8 | 14.9 | 8.8 | 7.5 | 3.9 | 3.1 | 1.1 | 38.3 | 50.0 |
Source: SCB

=== Norrbotten ===
| Location | Turnout | Share | Votes | S | M | FP | C | KDS | NyD | V | MP | Other | Left | Right |
|---|---|---|---|---|---|---|---|---|---|---|---|---|---|---|
| Arjeplog | 82.6 | 1.4 | 2,383 | 48.9 | 9.8 | 5.6 | 11.8 | 5.5 | 5.1 | 11.0 | 2.2 | 0.1 | 59.9 | 32.7 |
| Arvidsjaur | 85.0 | 3.2 | 5,331 | 55.9 | 9.0 | 6.3 | 9.3 | 5.1 | 3.0 | 9.7 | 1.1 | 0.6 | 65.5 | 29.7 |
| Boden | 87.1 | 11.7 | 19,618 | 54.7 | 14.1 | 7.2 | 6.7 | 5.0 | 3.1 | 6.8 | 2.3 | 0.1 | 61.5 | 33.0 |
| Gällivare | 79.2 | 8.1 | 13,510 | 55.5 | 11.0 | 5.0 | 4.0 | 3.2 | 2.4 | 15.6 | 2.2 | 1.0 | 71.1 | 23.3 |
| Haparanda | 77.6 | 2.9 | 4,832 | 52.2 | 14.6 | 4.1 | 16.0 | 3.4 | 2.2 | 5.0 | 1.9 | 0.6 | 57.2 | 38.1 |
| Jokkmokk | 82.0 | 2.5 | 4,214 | 54.1 | 12.1 | 7.7 | 4.5 | 3.7 | 3.6 | 10.6 | 3.6 | 0.2 | 64.7 | 28.0 |
| Kalix | 86.4 | 7.4 | 12,375 | 62.4 | 8.8 | 6.0 | 8.7 | 3.3 | 2.1 | 6.2 | 2.2 | 0.5 | 68.6 | 26.7 |
| Kiruna | 80.1 | 9.2 | 15,373 | 58.2 | 9.9 | 5.8 | 2.9 | 3.5 | 2.8 | 14.1 | 1.9 | 0.8 | 72.3 | 22.1 |
| Luleå | 87.1 | 26.7 | 44,767 | 51.1 | 13.8 | 9.7 | 6.2 | 4.8 | 3.0 | 7.8 | 3.3 | 0.3 | 58.9 | 34.5 |
| Pajala | 81.8 | 3.1 | 5,192 | 50.1 | 8.1 | 4.4 | 8.4 | 4.8 | 2.8 | 18.6 | 1.3 | 1.4 | 68.8 | 25.7 |
| Piteå | 89.9 | 16.1 | 26,887 | 60.6 | 7.6 | 6.2 | 8.4 | 6.0 | 2.5 | 5.8 | 1.9 | 0.9 | 66.3 | 28.3 |
| Älvsbyn | 88.1 | 3.8 | 6,295 | 58.7 | 6.1 | 5.1 | 9.0 | 5.8 | 3.1 | 10.2 | 1.8 | 0.2 | 68.9 | 26.1 |
| Överkalix | 84.4 | 1.9 | 3,111 | 61.7 | 6.0 | 4.5 | 12.6 | 2.1 | 1.5 | 10.0 | 1.0 | 0.6 | 71.7 | 25.2 |
| Övertorneå | 83.0 | 2.1 | 3,536 | 46.9 | 10.6 | 4.0 | 19.8 | 4.4 | 2.9 | 10.1 | 1.2 | 0.1 | 57.0 | 38.9 |
| Total | 85.3 | 3.1 | 167,424 | 55.5 | 11.0 | 6.9 | 7.3 | 4.6 | 2.8 | 9.1 | 2.4 | 0.6 | 64.5 | 29.8 |
Source: SCB

=== Skåne ===
Skåne was two separate counties at the time. Malmöhus was divided into Fyrstadskretsen (Four-city constituency) based around the Öresund urban areas and one covering the more rural parts of the county. Kristianstad County was one constituency for the whole county.

==== Kristianstad ====
| Location | Turnout | Share | Votes | S | M | FP | C | KDS | NyD | V | MP | Other | Left | Right |
|---|---|---|---|---|---|---|---|---|---|---|---|---|---|---|
| Bromölla | 86.4 | 4.2 | 7,809 | 56.8 | 12.9 | 5.4 | 5.4 | 4.0 | 6.9 | 4.7 | 2.4 | 1.5 | 61.4 | 27.7 |
| Båstad | 87.3 | 4.9 | 9,077 | 16.4 | 36.2 | 8.5 | 17.0 | 7.5 | 9.7 | 0.8 | 2.9 | 0.9 | 17.2 | 69.3 |
| Hässleholm | 86.2 | 17.2 | 31,653 | 33.0 | 22.2 | 6.5 | 12.5 | 9.7 | 7.8 | 2.2 | 2.5 | 3.6 | 35.2 | 50.8 |
| Klippan | 82.3 | 5.4 | 9,944 | 33.5 | 25.8 | 6.1 | 11.3 | 6.8 | 8.6 | 2.3 | 2.4 | 3.2 | 35.8 | 50.0 |
| Kristianstad | 85.7 | 25.3 | 46,516 | 38.2 | 24.6 | 8.6 | 7.5 | 6.2 | 7.9 | 2.4 | 2.5 | 2.1 | 40.7 | 46.9 |
| Osby | 85.7 | 4.7 | 8,686 | 40.8 | 15.7 | 5.7 | 11.9 | 9.0 | 10.0 | 3.1 | 2.4 | 1.4 | 43.9 | 42.3 |
| Perstorp | 84.8 | 2.4 | 4,398 | 38.5 | 21.3 | 7.0 | 10.0 | 7.8 | 8.7 | 1.9 | 2.0 | 3.0 | 40.4 | 46.0 |
| Simrishamn | 83.3 | 7.0 | 12,933 | 34.5 | 24.6 | 6.6 | 11.2 | 6.0 | 6.8 | 2.1 | 2.9 | 5.3 | 36.6 | 48.4 |
| Tomelilla | 81.9 | 4.2 | 7,740 | 31.7 | 21.7 | 5.0 | 14.9 | 4.7 | 7.6 | 1.5 | 2.3 | 10.5 | 33.2 | 46.4 |
| Åstorp | 85.4 | 4.2 | 7,699 | 40.3 | 26.2 | 5.4 | 7.3 | 6.6 | 7.8 | 1.7 | 1.4 | 3.3 | 42.0 | 45.5 |
| Ängelholm | 86.2 | 12.0 | 22,117 | 25.0 | 33.2 | 8.1 | 9.8 | 7.8 | 9.8 | 1.7 | 2.8 | 1.8 | 26.7 | 58.8 |
| Örkelljunga | 84.8 | 3.2 | 5,849 | 22.7 | 27.9 | 6.8 | 12.2 | 15.1 | 9.1 | 1.1 | 2.5 | 2.5 | 23.9 | 62.0 |
| Östra Göinge | 86.3 | 5.1 | 9,362 | 48.5 | 14.8 | 5.2 | 9.0 | 6.9 | 8.3 | 3.2 | 1.9 | 2.2 | 51.8 | 35.9 |
| Total | 85.4 | 3.4 | 183,783 | 34.9 | 24.4 | 7.1 | 10.3 | 7.4 | 8.3 | 2.2 | 2.5 | 2.9 | 37.1 | 49.2 |
Source: SCB

==== Malmö area ====
Four-city constituency (Swedish: Fyrstadskretsen)

| Location | Turnout | Share | Votes | S | M | FP | C | KDS | NyD | V | MP | Other | Left | Right |
|---|---|---|---|---|---|---|---|---|---|---|---|---|---|---|
| Helsingborg | 85.0 | 23.3 | 69,198 | 35.8 | 28.0 | 8.9 | 3.9 | 7.1 | 7.2 | 2.9 | 2.9 | 3.2 | 38.7 | 48.0 |
| Landskrona | 85.9 | 7.7 | 22,912 | 45.3 | 26.3 | 6.6 | 4.4 | 4.2 | 6.0 | 3.0 | 2.0 | 2.4 | 48.2 | 41.4 |
| Lund | 89.8 | 19.0 | 56,230 | 28.8 | 28.3 | 13.9 | 5.1 | 5.4 | 4.3 | 5.4 | 7.0 | 1.8 | 34.2 | 52.7 |
| Malmö | 85.2 | 50.0 | 148,141 | 39.0 | 32.4 | 7.4 | 2.2 | 4.6 | 5.9 | 3.3 | 3.0 | 2.2 | 42.3 | 46.6 |
| Total | 86.0 | 5.4 | 296,481 | 36.8 | 30.1 | 8.9 | 3.3 | 5.3 | 5.9 | 3.6 | 3.6 | 2.4 | 40.4 | 47.7 |
Source: SCB

==== Malmöhus ====
| Location | Turnout | Share | Votes | S | M | FP | C | KDS | NyD | V | MP | Other | Left | Right |
|---|---|---|---|---|---|---|---|---|---|---|---|---|---|---|
| Bjuv | 86.5 | 4.2 | 8,366 | 47.8 | 20.0 | 6.2 | 6.4 | 4.4 | 6.7 | 3.0 | 1.4 | 4.1 | 50.8 | 37.0 |
| Burlöv | 88.5 | 4.5 | 8,980 | 45.1 | 24.6 | 7.8 | 3.3 | 4.0 | 7.0 | 2.8 | 2.5 | 3.0 | 47.9 | 39.7 |
| Eslöv | 85.7 | 8.8 | 17,662 | 40.6 | 22.8 | 5.6 | 12.2 | 4.9 | 6.9 | 1.8 | 2.1 | 3.0 | 42.4 | 45.5 |
| Höganäs | 88.3 | 7.5 | 14,950 | 31.1 | 31.7 | 8.7 | 5.9 | 8.5 | 6.6 | 2.2 | 3.1 | 2.2 | 33.3 | 54.8 |
| Hörby | 85.0 | 4.3 | 8,645 | 24.3 | 21.0 | 6.6 | 18.0 | 9.7 | 10.4 | 1.5 | 2.5 | 6.1 | 25.8 | 55.2 |
| Höör | 85.6 | 4.0 | 7,999 | 27.2 | 26.3 | 7.4 | 12.4 | 8.0 | 10.4 | 1.7 | 3.8 | 2.9 | 28.9 | 54.0 |
| Kävlinge | 89.6 | 7.3 | 14,637 | 40.2 | 26.4 | 8.1 | 6.8 | 4.2 | 7.6 | 2.0 | 2.4 | 2.5 | 42.1 | 45.4 |
| Lomma | 92.6 | 5.8 | 11,563 | 28.4 | 38.2 | 11.0 | 4.2 | 5.7 | 6.2 | 1.1 | 2.9 | 2.3 | 29.5 | 59.1 |
| Sjöbo | 85.1 | 5.1 | 10,259 | 28.0 | 19.8 | 4.1 | 6.9 | 4.5 | 6.3 | 1.3 | 2.5 | 26.5 | 29.3 | 35.4 |
| Skurup | 85.9 | 4.2 | 8,395 | 32.6 | 23.2 | 6.6 | 13.0 | 5.0 | 7.1 | 1.8 | 2.1 | 8.7 | 34.4 | 47.8 |
| Staffanstorp | 90.5 | 5.6 | 11,236 | 32.5 | 33.4 | 10.0 | 6.4 | 4.8 | 6.1 | 1.4 | 2.5 | 2.7 | 34.0 | 54.8 |
| Svalöv | 86.5 | 3.9 | 7,869 | 37.6 | 21.3 | 6.1 | 15.5 | 6.1 | 7.6 | 1.7 | 2.4 | 1.7 | 39.3 | 49.0 |
| Svedala | 90.0 | 5.4 | 10,766 | 39.9 | 26.6 | 7.2 | 6.6 | 5.8 | 6.6 | 1.8 | 2.5 | 2.9 | 41.7 | 46.3 |
| Trelleborg | 87.2 | 11.6 | 23,267 | 46.2 | 22.5 | 6.3 | 6.3 | 5.3 | 5.3 | 2.2 | 2.4 | 3.6 | 48.4 | 40.3 |
| Vellinge | 92.9 | 9.4 | 18,792 | 20.9 | 49.6 | 8.8 | 3.9 | 5.1 | 7.6 | 0.7 | 1.9 | 1.6 | 21.6 | 67.3 |
| Ystad | 86.2 | 8.3 | 16,606 | 37.7 | 26.2 | 6.7 | 8.3 | 4.4 | 6.5 | 1.7 | 2.2 | 6.3 | 39.4 | 45.6 |
| Total | 88.0 | 3.7 | 199,992 | 35.4 | 28.0 | 7.3 | 8.0 | 5.5 | 7.0 | 1.8 | 2.4 | 4.6 | 37.2 | 48.8 |
Source: SCB

=== Stockholm County ===
==== Stockholm ====
| Location | Turnout | Share | Votes | S | M | FP | C | KDS | NyD | V | MP | Other | Left | Right |
|---|---|---|---|---|---|---|---|---|---|---|---|---|---|---|
| Stockholm | 85.7 | 100.0 | 433,200 | 29.8 | 30.7 | 11.4 | 2.9 | 4.9 | 6.8 | 7.1 | 5.3 | 1.0 | 36.9 | 50.0 |
| Total | 85.7 | 7.9 | 433,200 | 29.8 | 30.7 | 11.4 | 2.9 | 4.9 | 6.8 | 7.1 | 5.3 | 1.0 | 36.9 | 50.0 |
Source: SCB

==== Stockholm County ====
| Location | Turnout | Share | Votes | S | M | FP | C | KDS | NyD | V | MP | Other | Left | Right |
|---|---|---|---|---|---|---|---|---|---|---|---|---|---|---|
| Botkyrka | 83.8 | 5.8 | 33,449 | 36.8 | 25.7 | 10.9 | 3.6 | 5.4 | 8.2 | 5.2 | 3.7 | 0.5 | 42.0 | 45.6 |
| Danderyd | 93.0 | 3.3 | 18,836 | 12.2 | 54.0 | 13.3 | 2.6 | 5.4 | 7.2 | 1.5 | 3.5 | 0.2 | 13.7 | 75.3 |
| Ekerö | 91.2 | 2.1 | 11,944 | 21.8 | 35.4 | 13.6 | 6.8 | 5.2 | 8.8 | 2.8 | 5.3 | 0.4 | 24.5 | 61.0 |
| Haninge | 86.4 | 6.1 | 35,450 | 34.7 | 27.3 | 11.6 | 4.1 | 4.3 | 9.3 | 4.7 | 3.4 | 0.7 | 39.4 | 47.3 |
| Huddinge | 86.6 | 7.2 | 41,558 | 31.4 | 29.7 | 11.7 | 3.3 | 4.7 | 9.9 | 5.0 | 3.7 | 0.6 | 36.4 | 49.3 |
| Järfälla | 89.6 | 6.0 | 34,964 | 30.9 | 30.8 | 13.5 | 2.8 | 5.8 | 7.5 | 4.2 | 3.8 | 0.7 | 35.1 | 52.9 |
| Lidingö | 90.7 | 4.4 | 25,394 | 16.5 | 46.8 | 14.5 | 3.0 | 5.2 | 7.5 | 2.2 | 4.1 | 0.3 | 18.7 | 69.4 |
| Nacka | 88.3 | 6.7 | 38,763 | 26.5 | 36.1 | 13.3 | 2.7 | 4.3 | 7.8 | 4.3 | 4.5 | 0.4 | 30.8 | 56.5 |
| Norrtälje | 86.0 | 5.1 | 29,455 | 34.5 | 23.3 | 8.3 | 13.2 | 5.4 | 7.8 | 3.5 | 3.1 | 0.8 | 38.0 | 50.3 |
| Nynäshamn | 87.8 | 2.5 | 14,200 | 40.8 | 22.5 | 8.6 | 5.5 | 4.4 | 8.1 | 5.2 | 3.9 | 1.0 | 46.0 | 41.0 |
| Salem | 88.6 | 1.3 | 7,426 | 28.3 | 30.2 | 13.7 | 4.5 | 6.1 | 8.3 | 3.8 | 4.7 | 0.5 | 32.1 | 54.4 |
| Sigtuna | 85.1 | 3.1 | 18,158 | 32.8 | 30.0 | 11.0 | 5.5 | 5.3 | 8.4 | 3.3 | 3.3 | 0.4 | 36.1 | 51.8 |
| Sollentuna | 90.1 | 5.5 | 31,633 | 25.8 | 33.3 | 13.9 | 3.6 | 6.8 | 7.8 | 3.6 | 4.7 | 0.6 | 29.4 | 57.5 |
| Solna | 85.2 | 6.2 | 35,680 | 29.9 | 33.3 | 11.9 | 2.7 | 5.1 | 7.0 | 5.3 | 4.2 | 0.6 | 35.2 | 53.0 |
| Sundbyberg | 85.2 | 3.3 | 19,392 | 38.1 | 25.0 | 10.9 | 2.9 | 4.4 | 7.3 | 6.8 | 3.8 | 0.7 | 45.0 | 43.2 |
| Södertälje | 83.9 | 7.8 | 45,204 | 40.3 | 22.9 | 9.6 | 5.3 | 5.0 | 7.9 | 4.3 | 4.1 | 0.6 | 44.6 | 42.8 |
| Tyresö | 88.9 | 3.6 | 20,573 | 30.5 | 31.8 | 11.9 | 3.3 | 4.7 | 8.2 | 5.0 | 4.1 | 0.5 | 35.5 | 51.7 |
| Täby | 91.5 | 6.2 | 36,003 | 18.1 | 45.0 | 14.9 | 3.2 | 5.2 | 7.4 | 2.0 | 3.9 | 0.4 | 20.0 | 68.3 |
| Upplands-Bro | 87.2 | 2.0 | 11,308 | 35.5 | 28.3 | 9.8 | 4.3 | 6.3 | 8.4 | 4.1 | 3.0 | 0.3 | 39.6 | 48.7 |
| Upplands Väsby | 86.8 | 3.5 | 20,267 | 33.3 | 28.8 | 12.6 | 3.3 | 5.0 | 8.3 | 4.4 | 3.7 | 0.4 | 38.0 | 49.6 |
| Vallentuna | 89.3 | 2.3 | 13,514 | 23.8 | 34.9 | 11.9 | 6.6 | 6.1 | 8.7 | 2.8 | 4.7 | 0.4 | 26.7 | 59.4 |
| Vaxholm | 90.7 | 0.8 | 4,465 | 26.2 | 36.9 | 12.3 | 5.2 | 3.9 | 7.7 | 3.1 | 4.4 | 0.3 | 29.3 | 58.3 |
| Värmdö | 88.3 | 2.3 | 13,288 | 32.1 | 31.2 | 9.4 | 4.2 | 4.0 | 9.8 | 4.8 | 4.1 | 0.3 | 37.0 | 48.9 |
| Österåker | 89.0 | 3.2 | 18,332 | 25.9 | 36.2 | 12.9 | 4.4 | 4.6 | 8.7 | 3.0 | 4.0 | 0.3 | 28.9 | 58.1 |
| Total | 87.6 | 10.6 | 579,256 | 29.9 | 32.1 | 12.0 | 4.2 | 5.1 | 8.1 | 4.1 | 3.9 | 0.5 | 34.0 | 53.4 |
Source: SCB

=== Södermanland ===
| Location | Turnout | Share | Votes | S | M | FP | C | KDS | NyD | V | MP | Other | Left | Right |
|---|---|---|---|---|---|---|---|---|---|---|---|---|---|---|
| Eskilstuna | 85.3 | 33.8 | 54,763 | 46.4 | 17.5 | 9.8 | 5.7 | 5.9 | 7.2 | 4.0 | 2.7 | 0.9 | 50.3 | 38.9 |
| Flen | 87.0 | 6.6 | 10,765 | 45.4 | 15.6 | 7.0 | 11.8 | 6.4 | 6.1 | 4.1 | 3.1 | 0.4 | 49.5 | 40.8 |
| Gnesta | 86.4 | 3.4 | 5,564 | 33.8 | 19.4 | 7.8 | 15.1 | 6.0 | 9.3 | 3.7 | 4.4 | 0.5 | 37.5 | 48.4 |
| Katrineholm | 88.3 | 13.1 | 21,255 | 47.8 | 15.5 | 8.3 | 9.4 | 6.7 | 4.9 | 3.5 | 3.1 | 0.6 | 51.4 | 40.0 |
| Nyköping | 89.5 | 19.8 | 32,093 | 42.5 | 19.5 | 8.2 | 9.0 | 6.6 | 7.3 | 3.4 | 2.8 | 0.7 | 45.9 | 43.4 |
| Oxelösund | 87.8 | 5.0 | 8,183 | 54.6 | 13.0 | 6.4 | 3.8 | 3.9 | 8.7 | 6.4 | 2.5 | 0.9 | 61.0 | 27.0 |
| Strängnäs | 87.5 | 10.6 | 17,207 | 34.9 | 25.2 | 11.9 | 7.2 | 6.2 | 8.2 | 2.9 | 3.1 | 0.4 | 37.8 | 50.5 |
| Trosa | 88.4 | 3.6 | 5,879 | 32.5 | 26.8 | 10.7 | 8.4 | 4.8 | 9.6 | 3.1 | 3.5 | 0.4 | 35.6 | 50.8 |
| Vingåker | 87.7 | 3.9 | 6,342 | 46.5 | 13.1 | 7.1 | 11.9 | 7.5 | 6.7 | 3.3 | 3.7 | 0.2 | 49.8 | 39.6 |
| Total | 87.2 | 3.0 | 162,051 | 44.0 | 18.3 | 9.0 | 8.0 | 6.2 | 7.2 | 3.8 | 2.9 | 0.7 | 47.7 | 41.5 |
Source: SCB

=== Uppsala ===
| Location | Turnout | Share | Votes | S | M | FP | C | KDS | NyD | V | MP | Other | Left | Right |
|---|---|---|---|---|---|---|---|---|---|---|---|---|---|---|
| Enköping | 85.8 | 13.1 | 21,948 | 36.5 | 22.6 | 8.4 | 13.6 | 6.1 | 7.2 | 2.7 | 2.8 | 0.2 | 39.1 | 50.6 |
| Håbo | 88.1 | 5.4 | 8,971 | 30.6 | 34.3 | 9.1 | 5.1 | 4.4 | 11.1 | 3.1 | 2.1 | 0.3 | 33.6 | 52.9 |
| Tierp | 87.3 | 7.9 | 13,284 | 50.4 | 10.7 | 6.9 | 15.3 | 5.1 | 6.3 | 2.9 | 2.2 | 0.3 | 53.2 | 38.0 |
| Uppsala | 87.2 | 61.9 | 103,605 | 31.0 | 23.8 | 13.3 | 7.1 | 6.2 | 7.4 | 5.4 | 5.5 | 0.4 | 36.3 | 50.4 |
| Älvkarleby | 88.1 | 3.6 | 6,043 | 63.6 | 8.5 | 6.8 | 4.1 | 3.0 | 6.5 | 5.1 | 1.8 | 0.7 | 68.6 | 22.3 |
| Östhammar | 85.5 | 8.0 | 13,432 | 41.9 | 16.9 | 7.5 | 15.0 | 4.4 | 7.8 | 3.3 | 2.7 | 0.5 | 45.2 | 43.8 |
| Total | 87.0 | 3.1 | 167,283 | 35.3 | 22.0 | 11.2 | 9.0 | 5.8 | 7.5 | 4.5 | 4.3 | 0.4 | 39.8 | 48.1 |
Source: SCB

=== Värmland ===
| Location | Turnout | Share | Votes | S | M | FP | C | KDS | NyD | V | MP | Other | Left | Right |
|---|---|---|---|---|---|---|---|---|---|---|---|---|---|---|
| Arvika | 84.2 | 9.3 | 17,113 | 40.7 | 16.7 | 7.8 | 11.7 | 7.1 | 6.6 | 5.5 | 3.2 | 0.7 | 46.2 | 43.3 |
| Eda | 84.9 | 3.0 | 5,505 | 45.2 | 13.3 | 5.4 | 15.8 | 6.4 | 6.9 | 4.5 | 2.0 | 0.5 | 49.7 | 41.0 |
| Filipstad | 84.5 | 4.7 | 8,666 | 57.1 | 13.7 | 5.2 | 5.8 | 4.1 | 5.2 | 6.1 | 2.2 | 0.6 | 63.2 | 28.7 |
| Forshaga | 88.3 | 4.1 | 7,624 | 49.1 | 15.1 | 7.5 | 9.6 | 5.2 | 7.2 | 3.8 | 2.3 | 0.4 | 52.8 | 37.4 |
| Grums | 86.3 | 3.6 | 6,596 | 52.9 | 11.7 | 4.2 | 10.3 | 5.0 | 9.2 | 4.9 | 1.6 | 0.2 | 57.7 | 31.2 |
| Hagfors | 87.3 | 6.0 | 11,025 | 59.3 | 9.2 | 3.7 | 9.3 | 3.7 | 4.7 | 7.9 | 1.8 | 0.3 | 67.2 | 26.0 |
| Hammarö | 89.9 | 4.7 | 8,625 | 47.1 | 19.8 | 9.4 | 4.8 | 4.6 | 6.3 | 4.7 | 2.8 | 0.5 | 51.9 | 38.5 |
| Karlstad | 87.5 | 28.0 | 51,742 | 37.5 | 23.7 | 9.5 | 7.2 | 7.0 | 7.0 | 4.2 | 3.3 | 0.6 | 41.7 | 47.4 |
| Kil | 87.7 | 4.2 | 7,715 | 36.4 | 20.2 | 7.9 | 11.8 | 8.1 | 8.5 | 3.7 | 3.0 | 0.4 | 40.1 | 48.0 |
| Kristinehamn | 86.3 | 9.2 | 17,061 | 45.0 | 16.1 | 9.0 | 7.8 | 6.2 | 8.3 | 4.7 | 2.5 | 0.4 | 49.8 | 39.0 |
| Munkfors | 88.2 | 1.8 | 3,326 | 63.0 | 7.8 | 5.4 | 8.7 | 3.2 | 3.5 | 6.1 | 1.6 | 0.7 | 69.1 | 25.1 |
| Storfors | 88.1 | 1.8 | 3,327 | 53.3 | 12.3 | 6.0 | 9.3 | 4.6 | 7.5 | 5.5 | 1.3 | 0.3 | 58.9 | 32.1 |
| Sunne | 85.2 | 4.9 | 8,967 | 31.1 | 20.0 | 6.4 | 23.2 | 7.7 | 6.6 | 2.1 | 2.5 | 0.4 | 33.2 | 57.3 |
| Säffle | 85.4 | 6.4 | 11,817 | 37.5 | 17.6 | 5.8 | 17.2 | 7.6 | 9.0 | 3.0 | 1.9 | 0.4 | 40.5 | 48.2 |
| Torsby | 84.6 | 5.3 | 9,811 | 45.5 | 17.0 | 4.7 | 14.7 | 4.2 | 5.2 | 6.3 | 2.3 | 0.2 | 51.8 | 40.6 |
| Årjäng | 81.2 | 3.2 | 5,899 | 25.8 | 15.9 | 9.4 | 25.2 | 10.0 | 8.7 | 2.2 | 2.7 | 0.2 | 28.0 | 60.5 |
| Total | 86.4 | 3.4 | 184,819 | 42.9 | 17.9 | 7.5 | 10.7 | 6.3 | 7.0 | 4.6 | 2.6 | 0.5 | 47.5 | 42.4 |
Source: SCB

=== Västerbotten ===
| Location | Turnout | Share | Votes | S | M | FP | C | KDS | NyD | V | MP | Other | Left | Right |
|---|---|---|---|---|---|---|---|---|---|---|---|---|---|---|
| Bjurholm | 86.1 | 1.2 | 2,000 | 34.8 | 14.1 | 14.9 | 18.9 | 10.0 | 2.5 | 1.7 | 1.8 | 1.6 | 36.5 | 57.8 |
| Dorotea | 83.4 | 1.5 | 2,418 | 51.4 | 6.4 | 7.2 | 15.3 | 4.3 | 4.8 | 8.6 | 1.7 | 0.4 | 60.0 | 33.1 |
| Lycksele | 84.8 | 5.5 | 8,934 | 47.4 | 10.0 | 9.8 | 8.5 | 12.7 | 3.4 | 6.2 | 1.8 | 0.3 | 53.6 | 41.0 |
| Malå | 84.7 | 1.6 | 2,578 | 53.6 | 9.7 | 9.2 | 8.5 | 8.3 | 2.6 | 6.3 | 1.5 | 0.3 | 60.0 | 35.7 |
| Nordmaling | 85.9 | 3.2 | 5,150 | 44.8 | 11.6 | 7.4 | 17.2 | 9.9 | 4.5 | 3.0 | 1.5 | 0.1 | 47.8 | 46.0 |
| Norsjö | 83.5 | 2.1 | 3,365 | 45.8 | 7.1 | 9.3 | 17.8 | 7.9 | 3.0 | 5.9 | 2.3 | 1.0 | 51.7 | 42.1 |
| Robertsfors | 87.6 | 3.1 | 4,926 | 36.0 | 9.5 | 8.0 | 28.2 | 9.4 | 3.4 | 3.3 | 2.1 | 0.2 | 39.3 | 55.0 |
| Skellefteå | 87.2 | 30.5 | 49,170 | 50.6 | 8.9 | 9.0 | 13.1 | 8.3 | 2.8 | 4.8 | 2.3 | 0.2 | 55.4 | 39.4 |
| Sorsele | 79.4 | 1.3 | 2,164 | 42.2 | 10.4 | 7.3 | 14.7 | 12.3 | 3.7 | 6.3 | 2.8 | 0.2 | 48.5 | 44.8 |
| Storuman | 81.6 | 3.0 | 4,827 | 38.7 | 13.1 | 10.0 | 10.4 | 13.4 | 6.4 | 5.1 | 2.7 | 0.2 | 43.8 | 46.9 |
| Umeå | 87.7 | 36.2 | 58,377 | 42.0 | 13.3 | 11.4 | 9.6 | 7.5 | 4.6 | 6.2 | 5.1 | 0.2 | 48.3 | 41.8 |
| Vilhelmina | 82.6 | 3.2 | 5,235 | 46.9 | 7.5 | 10.2 | 12.0 | 8.8 | 4.7 | 7.1 | 2.7 | 0.1 | 53.9 | 38.5 |
| Vindeln | 84.2 | 2.6 | 4,233 | 35.9 | 11.9 | 10.7 | 19.5 | 12.2 | 4.7 | 2.8 | 2.2 | 0.0 | 38.7 | 54.3 |
| Vännäs | 86.0 | 3.3 | 5,363 | 43.1 | 9.1 | 7.9 | 18.1 | 8.9 | 4.2 | 5.8 | 2.7 | 0.1 | 48.9 | 44.0 |
| Åsele | 83.2 | 1.7 | 2,708 | 53.7 | 8.3 | 5.9 | 15.5 | 6.9 | 3.5 | 4.8 | 1.3 | 0.1 | 58.5 | 36.5 |
| Total | 86.4 | 3.0 | 161,448 | 45.3 | 10.8 | 9.9 | 12.6 | 8.6 | 3.9 | 5.4 | 3.3 | 0.2 | 50.7 | 41.9 |
Source: SCB

=== Västernorrland ===
| Location | Turnout | Share | Votes | S | M | FP | C | KDS | NyD | V | MP | Other | Left | Right |
|---|---|---|---|---|---|---|---|---|---|---|---|---|---|---|
| Härnösand | 86.8 | 10.5 | 18,293 | 38.4 | 19.4 | 7.6 | 12.8 | 7.1 | 5.8 | 4.4 | 4.2 | 0.4 | 42.7 | 46.8 |
| Kramfors | 87.7 | 9.7 | 16,752 | 52.2 | 10.3 | 3.6 | 14.9 | 6.3 | 3.2 | 6.7 | 2.6 | 0.2 | 58.9 | 35.1 |
| Sollefteå | 87.6 | 9.7 | 16,751 | 55.5 | 11.2 | 4.0 | 11.5 | 5.3 | 3.5 | 5.7 | 3.1 | 0.4 | 61.2 | 31.9 |
| Sundsvall | 86.4 | 35.7 | 62,015 | 45.5 | 15.2 | 9.7 | 8.5 | 6.3 | 5.3 | 5.4 | 3.5 | 0.7 | 50.9 | 39.7 |
| Timrå | 86.3 | 7.0 | 12,128 | 55.2 | 8.6 | 6.8 | 9.7 | 5.5 | 4.4 | 7.0 | 2.0 | 0.8 | 62.2 | 30.6 |
| Ånge | 83.3 | 4.7 | 8,155 | 48.2 | 10.0 | 4.1 | 15.9 | 5.3 | 5.5 | 6.5 | 4.0 | 0.7 | 54.7 | 35.2 |
| Örnsköldsvik | 87.7 | 22.7 | 39,472 | 49.0 | 10.5 | 7.4 | 12.9 | 10.2 | 4.5 | 2.9 | 2.3 | 0.3 | 51.9 | 41.0 |
| Total | 86.8 | 3.2 | 173,566 | 47.9 | 13.0 | 7.3 | 11.3 | 7.1 | 4.7 | 5.1 | 3.1 | 0.5 | 53.0 | 38.7 |
Source: SCB

=== Västmanland ===
| Location | Turnout | Share | Votes | S | M | FP | C | KDS | NyD | V | MP | Other | Left | Right |
|---|---|---|---|---|---|---|---|---|---|---|---|---|---|---|
| Arboga | 86.3 | 5.8 | 9,499 | 45.3 | 17.2 | 8.8 | 8.4 | 6.7 | 5.3 | 4.2 | 3.5 | 0.6 | 49.5 | 41.1 |
| Fagersta | 86.0 | 5.4 | 8,837 | 56.0 | 13.4 | 6.8 | 4.4 | 5.2 | 6.3 | 4.8 | 2.1 | 0.9 | 60.9 | 29.8 |
| Hallstahammar | 86.4 | 6.3 | 10,177 | 55.0 | 12.3 | 7.5 | 4.5 | 4.7 | 7.8 | 5.6 | 1.8 | 0.9 | 60.6 | 29.0 |
| Heby | 85.4 | 5.2 | 8,449 | 38.2 | 12.4 | 5.3 | 20.2 | 8.9 | 8.7 | 3.7 | 2.4 | 0.2 | 41.9 | 46.7 |
| Kungsör | 87.2 | 3.3 | 5,370 | 43.2 | 16.8 | 9.9 | 9.5 | 5.5 | 7.0 | 4.3 | 3.7 | 0.2 | 47.5 | 41.6 |
| Köping | 84.9 | 10.0 | 16,164 | 48.5 | 14.7 | 7.5 | 8.1 | 6.7 | 5.9 | 5.5 | 2.7 | 0.4 | 54.1 | 37.0 |
| Norberg | 86.6 | 2.6 | 4,177 | 53.2 | 11.9 | 5.4 | 6.9 | 3.6 | 5.8 | 9.3 | 3.4 | 0.7 | 62.5 | 27.7 |
| Sala | 86.7 | 8.7 | 14,078 | 35.2 | 16.1 | 8.5 | 14.9 | 8.3 | 10.1 | 3.4 | 3.0 | 0.3 | 38.6 | 47.9 |
| Skinnskatteberg | 86.5 | 2.0 | 3,218 | 52.9 | 11.4 | 5.6 | 8.6 | 5.1 | 6.2 | 6.8 | 2.9 | 0.5 | 59.7 | 30.7 |
| Surahammar | 86.3 | 4.1 | 6,658 | 58.3 | 10.7 | 6.5 | 3.7 | 4.6 | 7.1 | 6.2 | 2.3 | 0.6 | 64.5 | 25.5 |
| Västerås | 85.8 | 46.7 | 75,824 | 40.4 | 21.8 | 12.3 | 4.0 | 6.5 | 7.9 | 3.7 | 2.9 | 0.6 | 44.1 | 44.6 |
| Total | 85.9 | 3.0 | 162,451 | 44.1 | 17.7 | 9.7 | 6.9 | 6.4 | 7.5 | 4.4 | 2.8 | 0.5 | 48.5 | 40.7 |
Source: SCB

=== Västra Götaland ===
Västra Götaland did have three different counties at the time. Those were Göteborg och Bohuslän, Skaraborg and Älvsborg. There were five constituencies, namely two for Göteborg och Bohuslän, one for Skaraborg and two for Älvsborg.

==== Bohuslän ====
| Location | Turnout | Share | Votes | S | M | FP | C | KDS | NyD | V | MP | Other | Left | Right |
|---|---|---|---|---|---|---|---|---|---|---|---|---|---|---|
| Härryda | 89.6 | 8.5 | 16,606 | 30.2 | 25.6 | 13.6 | 6.4 | 7.3 | 8.3 | 4.0 | 4.3 | 0.3 | 34.2 | 53.0 |
| Kungälv | 90.2 | 11.5 | 22,430 | 33.1 | 23.2 | 10.4 | 9.5 | 8.1 | 7.4 | 4.1 | 3.5 | 0.6 | 37.2 | 51.2 |
| Lysekil | 87.8 | 5.0 | 9,881 | 48.0 | 15.8 | 10.5 | 5.8 | 5.6 | 6.8 | 4.1 | 3.1 | 0.3 | 52.1 | 37.7 |
| Munkedal | 84.3 | 3.5 | 6,930 | 34.8 | 15.9 | 6.6 | 18.1 | 9.1 | 9.7 | 3.2 | 2.5 | 0.1 | 38.0 | 49.7 |
| Mölndal | 88.6 | 17.1 | 33,448 | 33.1 | 24.1 | 13.8 | 5.2 | 7.5 | 7.0 | 4.9 | 3.6 | 0.7 | 38.0 | 50.6 |
| Orust | 86.7 | 4.6 | 9,027 | 30.0 | 20.1 | 11.4 | 14.0 | 8.1 | 9.1 | 3.7 | 3.4 | 0.1 | 33.7 | 53.6 |
| Partille | 88.9 | 10.0 | 19,494 | 30.0 | 25.8 | 14.0 | 4.2 | 8.6 | 8.6 | 4.7 | 3.6 | 0.4 | 34.7 | 52.7 |
| Sotenäs | 86.3 | 3.2 | 6,351 | 38.4 | 19.9 | 13.0 | 7.9 | 7.8 | 6.8 | 3.0 | 3.0 | 0.2 | 41.4 | 48.6 |
| Stenungsund | 87.3 | 5.9 | 11,550 | 31.2 | 24.7 | 11.4 | 8.8 | 7.8 | 9.2 | 3.1 | 3.5 | 0.4 | 34.3 | 52.7 |
| Strömstad | 82.7 | 3.2 | 6,263 | 35.6 | 20.0 | 9.9 | 14.0 | 6.2 | 6.8 | 3.3 | 4.1 | 0.1 | 38.9 | 50.1 |
| Tanum | 83.9 | 3.8 | 7,493 | 23.9 | 21.8 | 10.4 | 20.2 | 7.3 | 9.8 | 2.3 | 4.0 | 0.3 | 26.2 | 59.6 |
| Tjörn | 87.7 | 4.5 | 8,779 | 23.7 | 23.0 | 14.0 | 6.4 | 17.5 | 10.1 | 2.1 | 2.9 | 0.3 | 25.8 | 60.9 |
| Uddevalla | 85.9 | 15.5 | 30,411 | 41.2 | 17.9 | 8.5 | 8.7 | 8.0 | 7.3 | 4.5 | 3.4 | 0.5 | 45.7 | 43.1 |
| Öckerö | 89.9 | 3.7 | 7,193 | 25.2 | 23.8 | 11.3 | 3.3 | 22.9 | 7.1 | 2.2 | 3.9 | 0.2 | 27.5 | 61.3 |
| Total | 87.6 | 3.6 | 195,856 | 33.5 | 22.1 | 11.6 | 8.3 | 8.7 | 7.9 | 4.0 | 3.5 | 0.4 | 37.5 | 50.6 |
Source: SCB

==== Gothenburg ====
| Location | Turnout | Share | Votes | S | M | FP | C | KDS | NyD | V | MP | Other | Left | Right |
|---|---|---|---|---|---|---|---|---|---|---|---|---|---|---|
| Gothenburg | 85.7 | 100.0 | 270,406 | 33.2 | 25.0 | 12.1 | 3.1 | 7.3 | 7.1 | 6.8 | 4.5 | 0.8 | 40.0 | 47.6 |
| Total | 85.7 | 4.9 | 270,406 | 33.2 | 25.0 | 12.1 | 3.1 | 7.3 | 7.1 | 6.8 | 4.5 | 0.8 | 40.0 | 47.6 |
Source: SCB

==== Skaraborg ====
| Location | Turnout | Share | Votes | S | M | FP | C | KDS | NyD | V | MP | Other | Left | Right |
|---|---|---|---|---|---|---|---|---|---|---|---|---|---|---|
| Essunga | 87.6 | 2.2 | 3,860 | 23.0 | 22.0 | 6.8 | 23.2 | 9.4 | 11.0 | 2.1 | 2.1 | 0.4 | 25.1 | 61.5 |
| Falköping | 88.4 | 12.0 | 21,444 | 30.4 | 22.1 | 6.1 | 15.0 | 11.9 | 7.6 | 3.9 | 2.7 | 0.2 | 34.3 | 55.2 |
| Grästorp | 87.5 | 2.2 | 3,902 | 23.8 | 23.7 | 6.6 | 20.6 | 10.0 | 10.3 | 2.3 | 2.6 | 0.3 | 26.0 | 60.8 |
| Gullspång | 85.4 | 2.3 | 4,074 | 37.8 | 16.1 | 5.6 | 15.0 | 8.5 | 9.0 | 4.5 | 3.2 | 0.4 | 42.3 | 45.2 |
| Götene | 88.9 | 4.8 | 8,651 | 33.9 | 17.7 | 7.5 | 14.4 | 11.6 | 8.3 | 3.7 | 2.6 | 0.3 | 37.6 | 51.2 |
| Habo | 89.8 | 3.2 | 5,785 | 28.8 | 20.9 | 7.7 | 9.0 | 20.1 | 7.7 | 2.2 | 2.9 | 0.6 | 31.0 | 57.8 |
| Hjo | 87.6 | 3.3 | 5,912 | 33.4 | 21.5 | 7.8 | 10.9 | 12.8 | 7.8 | 2.5 | 3.1 | 0.3 | 35.9 | 53.0 |
| Karlsborg | 88.9 | 3.1 | 5,466 | 37.5 | 20.3 | 7.3 | 12.4 | 9.8 | 6.9 | 2.6 | 2.7 | 0.4 | 40.1 | 49.8 |
| Lidköping | 87.5 | 13.3 | 23,772 | 37.5 | 18.1 | 8.4 | 12.0 | 8.6 | 7.2 | 5.3 | 2.7 | 0.3 | 42.8 | 47.0 |
| Mariestad | 86.0 | 8.9 | 15,943 | 38.4 | 19.7 | 7.3 | 9.3 | 9.4 | 8.1 | 4.1 | 3.1 | 0.5 | 42.6 | 45.7 |
| Mullsjö | 90.9 | 2.5 | 4,535 | 28.1 | 19.0 | 7.4 | 10.1 | 21.3 | 7.3 | 2.7 | 3.4 | 0.6 | 30.8 | 57.9 |
| Skara | 87.6 | 6.8 | 12,200 | 34.6 | 21.2 | 8.4 | 11.8 | 8.5 | 7.9 | 3.1 | 4.0 | 0.4 | 37.7 | 50.0 |
| Skövde | 86.8 | 16.8 | 30,035 | 36.5 | 20.5 | 9.2 | 9.9 | 9.2 | 7.7 | 3.2 | 2.8 | 0.9 | 39.7 | 48.9 |
| Tibro | 87.1 | 4.0 | 7,152 | 35.9 | 17.4 | 9.4 | 10.3 | 12.5 | 8.2 | 3.1 | 2.2 | 1.0 | 39.0 | 49.7 |
| Tidaholm | 88.8 | 4.9 | 8,705 | 43.6 | 15.0 | 7.3 | 12.1 | 8.7 | 7.4 | 3.6 | 1.9 | 0.3 | 47.2 | 43.1 |
| Töreboda | 84.1 | 3.6 | 6,478 | 32.4 | 18.0 | 5.2 | 19.2 | 9.0 | 9.9 | 3.2 | 2.8 | 0.3 | 35.6 | 51.4 |
| Vara | 86.6 | 6.1 | 10,998 | 23.7 | 24.4 | 6.2 | 19.4 | 9.7 | 11.7 | 2.2 | 2.4 | 0.3 | 25.9 | 59.7 |
| Total | 87.5 | 3.3 | 178,912 | 34.1 | 20.0 | 7.6 | 12.9 | 10.5 | 8.2 | 3.5 | 2.8 | 0.5 | 37.7 | 50.9 |
Source: SCB

==== Älvsborg N ====
| Location | Turnout | Share | Votes | S | M | FP | C | KDS | NyD | V | MP | Other | Left | Right |
|---|---|---|---|---|---|---|---|---|---|---|---|---|---|---|
| Ale | 89.0 | 9.1 | 15,002 | 39.4 | 18.8 | 8.8 | 8.5 | 7.4 | 8.6 | 5.4 | 2.9 | 0.3 | 44.8 | 43.5 |
| Alingsås | 89.7 | 13.3 | 22,026 | 32.8 | 19.7 | 11.0 | 8.5 | 12.4 | 7.0 | 4.4 | 4.0 | 0.3 | 37.1 | 51.6 |
| Bengtsfors | 85.0 | 4.5 | 7,530 | 39.3 | 14.9 | 6.4 | 16.1 | 10.2 | 7.3 | 3.3 | 2.3 | 0.3 | 42.5 | 47.6 |
| Dals-Ed | 84.1 | 2.0 | 3,311 | 25.0 | 15.8 | 5.9 | 24.8 | 14.6 | 8.1 | 2.0 | 3.3 | 0.6 | 27.0 | 61.1 |
| Färgelanda | 86.8 | 2.9 | 4,746 | 33.9 | 15.1 | 6.8 | 21.9 | 7.6 | 9.7 | 2.3 | 2.3 | 0.4 | 36.2 | 51.4 |
| Herrljunga | 89.6 | 3.8 | 6,304 | 26.9 | 18.5 | 7.1 | 20.0 | 13.9 | 7.7 | 3.0 | 2.8 | 0.3 | 29.9 | 59.4 |
| Lerum | 91.1 | 12.7 | 20,981 | 26.7 | 27.4 | 13.2 | 5.8 | 9.7 | 8.3 | 4.1 | 4.5 | 0.4 | 30.8 | 56.1 |
| Lilla Edet | 86.1 | 4.6 | 7,626 | 41.6 | 14.4 | 6.8 | 13.2 | 6.6 | 9.2 | 5.3 | 2.6 | 0.5 | 46.9 | 40.9 |
| Mellerud | 86.5 | 4.1 | 6,783 | 29.3 | 17.6 | 5.8 | 22.5 | 10.1 | 9.3 | 2.2 | 3.1 | 0.2 | 31.5 | 56.0 |
| Trollhättan | 87.1 | 19.3 | 32,021 | 45.4 | 17.8 | 9.2 | 6.7 | 5.8 | 7.2 | 4.5 | 2.8 | 0.5 | 49.9 | 39.5 |
| Vårgårda | 89.4 | 4.0 | 6,583 | 24.6 | 18.0 | 8.2 | 16.7 | 18.7 | 7.7 | 2.7 | 3.0 | 0.3 | 27.3 | 61.7 |
| Vänersborg | 86.6 | 14.4 | 23,879 | 36.1 | 18.6 | 9.2 | 11.4 | 8.5 | 8.3 | 4.5 | 3.3 | 0.3 | 40.6 | 47.6 |
| Åmål | 85.1 | 5.3 | 8,709 | 42.8 | 17.5 | 7.3 | 12.2 | 8.0 | 6.9 | 3.0 | 2.0 | 0.3 | 45.8 | 45.0 |
| Total | 87.9 | 3.0 | 165,501 | 35.9 | 19.1 | 9.2 | 11.0 | 9.3 | 7.9 | 4.1 | 3.2 | 0.4 | 40.0 | 48.5 |
Source: SCB

==== Älvsborg S ====
| Location | Turnout | Share | Votes | S | M | FP | C | KDS | NyD | V | MP | Other | Left | Right |
|---|---|---|---|---|---|---|---|---|---|---|---|---|---|---|
| Borås | 88.0 | 56.2 | 66,074 | 39.2 | 22.0 | 8.9 | 7.2 | 9.5 | 5.7 | 3.8 | 2.7 | 0.9 | 43.0 | 47.6 |
| Mark | 89.3 | 18.2 | 21,343 | 40.7 | 17.0 | 6.3 | 14.3 | 8.9 | 6.1 | 3.5 | 2.7 | 0.5 | 44.2 | 46.5 |
| Svenljunga | 87.3 | 6.1 | 7,117 | 30.3 | 20.5 | 8.1 | 20.3 | 9.0 | 7.1 | 1.7 | 2.7 | 0.4 | 32.0 | 57.9 |
| Tranemo | 90.0 | 6.8 | 7,962 | 35.7 | 18.9 | 7.7 | 19.0 | 8.5 | 5.9 | 1.7 | 2.3 | 0.3 | 37.5 | 54.0 |
| Ulricehamn | 89.0 | 12.8 | 14,979 | 27.5 | 19.8 | 8.5 | 18.1 | 12.6 | 7.6 | 2.1 | 3.4 | 0.4 | 29.7 | 59.0 |
| Total | 88.5 | 2.1 | 117,475 | 37.2 | 20.5 | 8.2 | 11.5 | 9.7 | 6.1 | 3.3 | 2.8 | 0.7 | 40.5 | 49.9 |
Source: SCB

=== Örebro ===
| Location | Turnout | Share | Votes | S | M | FP | C | KDS | NyD | V | MP | Other | Left | Right |
|---|---|---|---|---|---|---|---|---|---|---|---|---|---|---|
| Askersund | 86.8 | 4.4 | 7,769 | 43.8 | 14.8 | 6.2 | 13.1 | 9.5 | 6.6 | 3.2 | 2.3 | 0.6 | 46.9 | 43.6 |
| Degerfors | 89.7 | 4.3 | 7,691 | 59.7 | 8.6 | 5.4 | 6.4 | 4.9 | 5.3 | 7.4 | 2.1 | 0.2 | 67.1 | 25.3 |
| Hallsberg | 87.2 | 6.1 | 10,796 | 47.1 | 11.7 | 7.3 | 10.4 | 8.3 | 7.0 | 5.5 | 2.1 | 0.7 | 52.6 | 37.6 |
| Hällefors | 83.4 | 3.3 | 5,892 | 59.0 | 10.6 | 5.0 | 6.4 | 4.2 | 5.1 | 7.0 | 2.4 | 0.3 | 65.9 | 26.3 |
| Karlskoga | 87.1 | 12.7 | 22,473 | 49.9 | 17.5 | 8.8 | 4.0 | 5.7 | 6.8 | 5.3 | 1.8 | 0.2 | 55.2 | 36.0 |
| Kumla | 88.1 | 6.8 | 12,111 | 43.0 | 15.0 | 8.3 | 9.6 | 9.8 | 7.0 | 5.0 | 2.0 | 0.4 | 47.9 | 42.7 |
| Laxå | 85.2 | 2.7 | 4,715 | 48.1 | 10.2 | 8.3 | 9.2 | 9.4 | 6.7 | 5.2 | 2.2 | 0.7 | 53.4 | 37.1 |
| Lindesberg | 85.9 | 8.9 | 15,756 | 43.3 | 13.7 | 7.5 | 12.3 | 8.5 | 6.6 | 4.6 | 3.0 | 0.5 | 47.9 | 42.0 |
| Ljusnarsberg | 83.6 | 2.3 | 4,099 | 49.5 | 10.2 | 5.7 | 8.9 | 5.1 | 8.5 | 8.6 | 2.9 | 0.7 | 58.1 | 29.8 |
| Nora | 86.0 | 3.7 | 6,585 | 42.2 | 15.6 | 8.1 | 9.1 | 7.6 | 7.8 | 5.6 | 3.4 | 0.6 | 47.8 | 40.3 |
| Örebro | 87.3 | 44.8 | 79,566 | 38.2 | 17.9 | 11.9 | 6.8 | 9.5 | 6.7 | 4.9 | 3.3 | 0.8 | 43.0 | 46.1 |
| Total | 86.9 | 3.2 | 177,453 | 43.5 | 15.7 | 9.4 | 7.8 | 8.3 | 6.7 | 5.2 | 2.8 | 0.6 | 48.7 | 41.2 |
Source: SCB

=== Östergötland ===
Although both blocs got rounded to 44.7%, the leftist bloc won Valdemarsvik by 2,565 to 2,563 votes.

| Location | Turnout | Share | Votes | S | M | FP | C | KDS | NyD | V | MP | Other | Left | Right |
|---|---|---|---|---|---|---|---|---|---|---|---|---|---|---|
| Boxholm | 88.1 | 1.4 | 3,727 | 50.2 | 10.2 | 4.0 | 14.5 | 8.6 | 5.0 | 4.8 | 2.3 | 0.3 | 55.1 | 37.3 |
| Finspång | 89.1 | 5.8 | 15,095 | 50.7 | 12.3 | 6.6 | 7.5 | 8.3 | 6.4 | 5.1 | 2.8 | 0.4 | 55.8 | 34.7 |
| Kinda | 86.1 | 2.6 | 6,698 | 32.2 | 16.1 | 5.7 | 20.4 | 13.3 | 6.3 | 2.9 | 2.5 | 0.4 | 35.2 | 55.6 |
| Linköping | 88.3 | 31.2 | 81,554 | 32.9 | 24.9 | 10.8 | 6.9 | 9.8 | 6.2 | 4.0 | 3.5 | 1.0 | 36.9 | 52.4 |
| Mjölby | 86.9 | 6.5 | 16,908 | 41.9 | 17.9 | 7.1 | 10.4 | 9.4 | 7.2 | 3.5 | 2.1 | 0.6 | 45.4 | 44.7 |
| Motala | 86.8 | 10.3 | 26,835 | 47.9 | 16.1 | 8.2 | 7.1 | 7.1 | 6.0 | 4.1 | 2.5 | 0.9 | 52.0 | 38.5 |
| Norrköping | 85.7 | 29.1 | 76,036 | 39.6 | 23.6 | 7.6 | 5.7 | 7.4 | 7.2 | 4.4 | 2.9 | 1.6 | 43.9 | 44.3 |
| Söderköping | 87.7 | 3.2 | 8,455 | 30.1 | 23.1 | 6.7 | 15.6 | 8.3 | 8.7 | 2.6 | 3.7 | 0.3 | 32.6 | 53.8 |
| Vadstena | 89.2 | 2.0 | 5,180 | 39.9 | 20.5 | 7.8 | 11.0 | 9.4 | 6.3 | 2.4 | 2.4 | 0.3 | 42.3 | 48.7 |
| Valdemarsvik | 87.5 | 2.2 | 5,736 | 41.8 | 16.7 | 4.7 | 16.4 | 6.8 | 7.1 | 2.9 | 2.2 | 1.3 | 44.7 | 44.7 |
| Ydre | 89.5 | 1.1 | 2,856 | 26.5 | 14.8 | 6.1 | 22.7 | 17.0 | 6.7 | 2.5 | 3.0 | 0.6 | 29.0 | 60.6 |
| Åtvidaberg | 88.9 | 3.2 | 8,389 | 46.0 | 14.9 | 6.5 | 11.6 | 9.1 | 6.0 | 3.1 | 2.4 | 0.5 | 49.1 | 42.0 |
| Ödeshög | 88.7 | 1.5 | 3,918 | 33.4 | 16.4 | 5.1 | 16.7 | 15.7 | 6.5 | 2.2 | 3.4 | 0.7 | 35.5 | 53.9 |
| Total | 87.3 | 4.8 | 261,387 | 38.8 | 21.1 | 8.3 | 8.3 | 8.8 | 6.6 | 4.0 | 3.0 | 1.1 | 42.8 | 46.6 |
Source: SCB
