= Rödåsel =

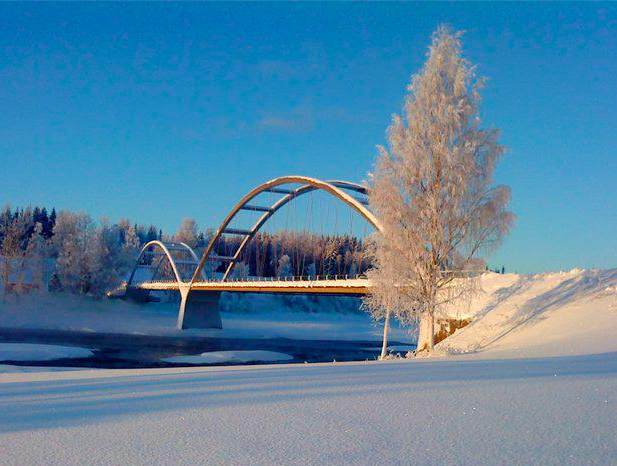
- Bridge over the Vindel river at Holmforsen in Rödåsel

- Location within Västerbotten
- Coordinates: 64°05′N 19°57′E
- Country: Sweden
- Province: Västerbotten
- County: Västerbotten County
- Municipality: Umeå Municipality

Area
  - Total: 0.20 km^{2} (0.077 sq mi)

Population (31 December 2010)
  - Total: 96
- Time zone: UTC+1 (CET)
  - Summer (DST): UTC+2 (CEST)
- Website: www.rodabygden.se

Rödåsel is a smaller locality in the city of Umeå, Sweden. It is located just south of the outlet of the stream Rödån in Vindelälven. The nearest population centers are Tavelsjö (10 km), Vindeln (21 km), Vännäs (26 km) and Umeå (38 km). The population in Rödåsel is around 100 people. County road 363 passes outside the village. Rödåsel is included in Rödåbygden which contains the villages of Blomdal, Rödåliden, Rödånäs, Västra Överrödå, Älglund, and Överrödå. In Rödåsel there is a primary school, gas station, community center, antique shop, joinery, a number of small businesses and several farms. The rapids of Holmforsen in Vindelälven at Rödåsel are valued by whitewater kayakers. The village also has a jogging and cross-country skiing track with electric lights which starts near the gas station. Bathing areas are at Hundsjön (2 km south of the village) and in Sandvika (on the river's east side 1 km south of the bridge).

== Etymology ==
The Rödåsel name (Red River Lake) has two parts: the older first part, Rödå-, combined with the later part, -sel, is designating a quiet lake-like section between two rapids in a large river, in this case Vindelälven. Rödå is probably given from the rich presence of red ocher soil which colors the water of the local watercourse Rödån (Red river). A number of villages in the area have similar forms of names: Rödåbäck (Red River Stream), Rödåliden (Red River Hills), Rödålund (Red River Grove), Rödånäs (Red River Isthmus), and Överrödå (Upper Red River).

== History ==
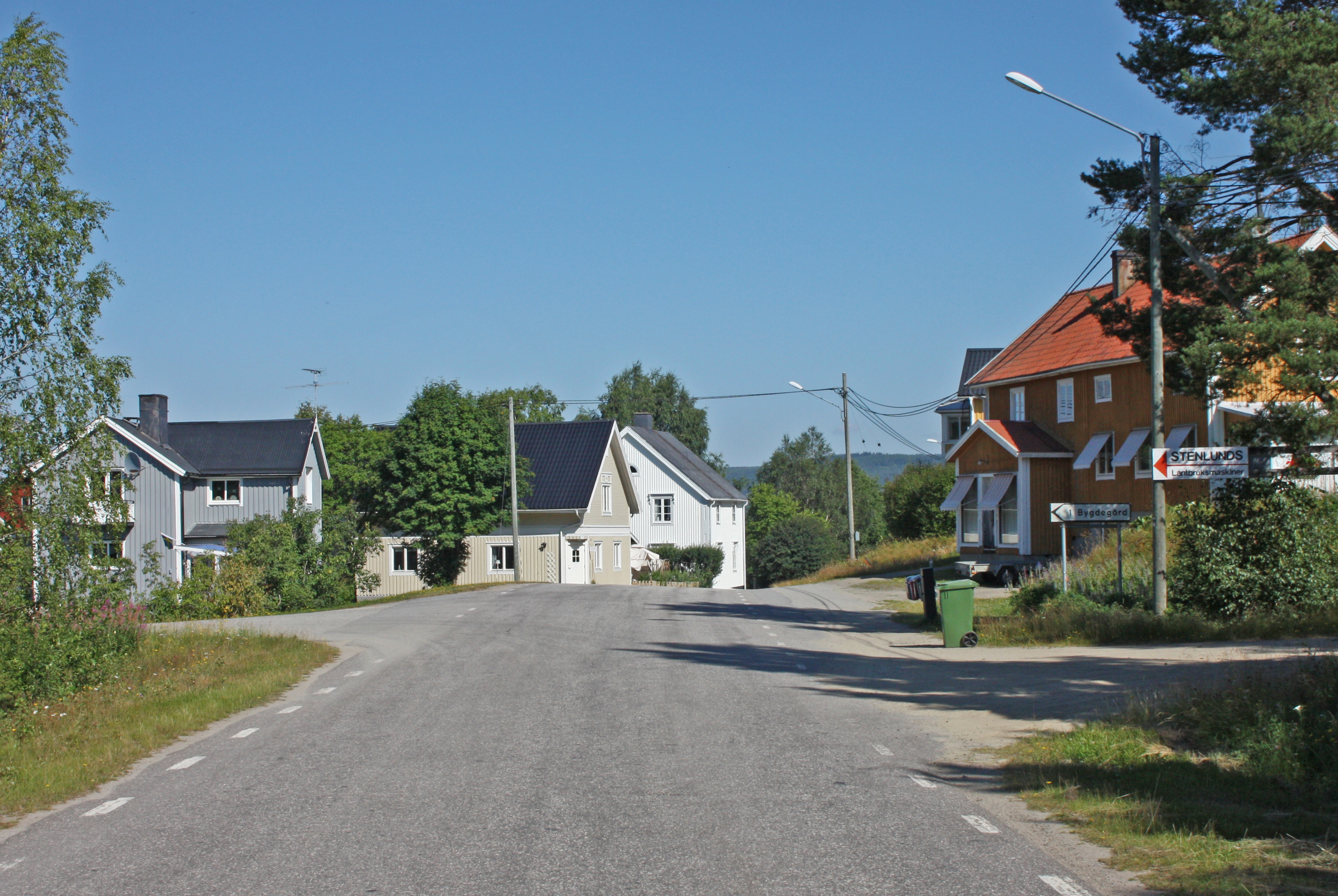
"Dalarna" in the northern part of Rödåsel in 2013

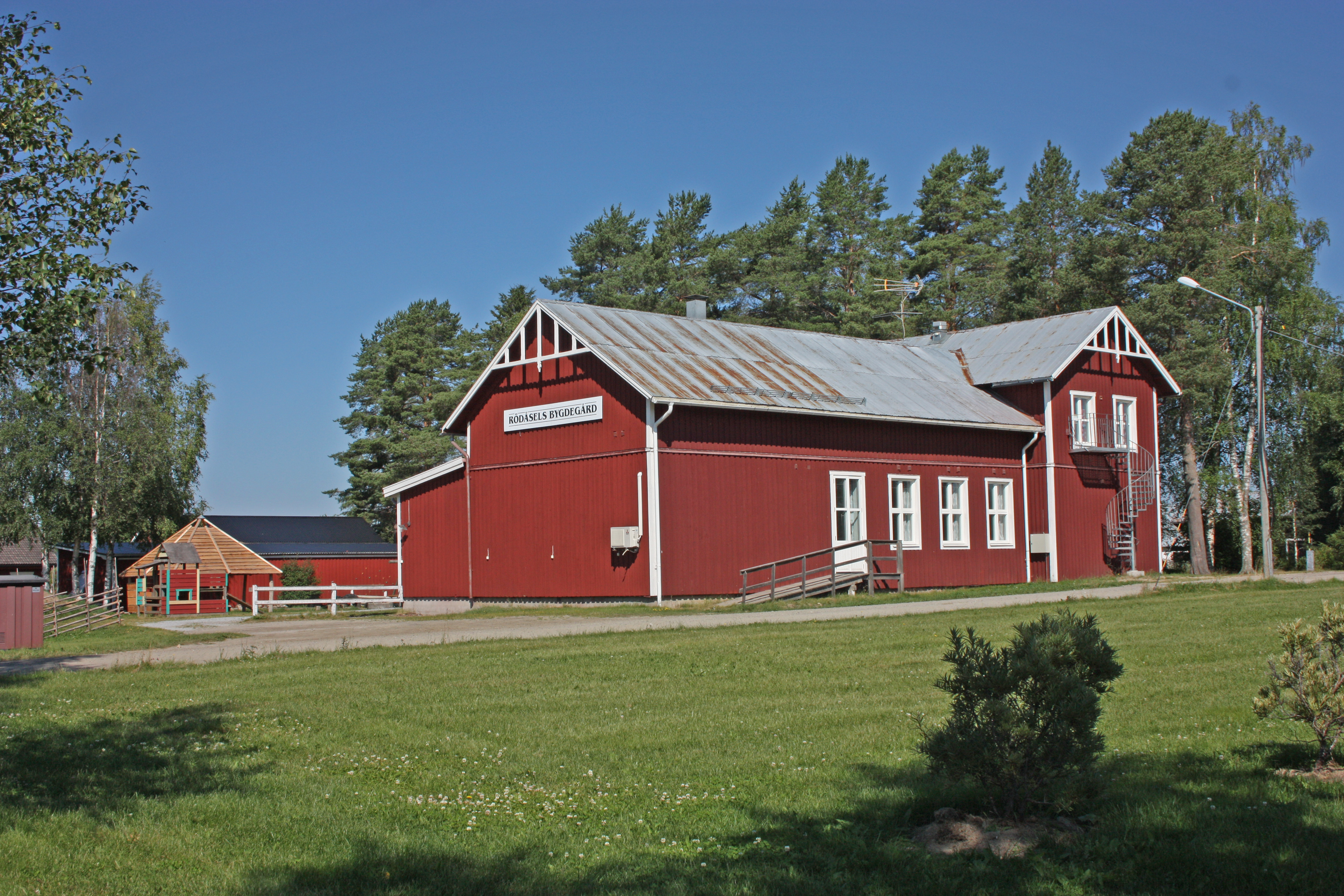
The old school house of Rödåsel and present community centre in 2013

In the old times the village was called Röödåå, Nederrödå, and later Ytterrödå.

Before 1910, Ytterrödå was first and foremost a forestry and agricultural village containing a handful of small farms. In addition to farming, the people increased to their income with forestry work, timber and tar rafting, charring and tar.

In the northern parts villagers used to construct tar pits in the old days and therefore this part of the village was called "Dalarna" (the Pits). 1921 the name of the village was changed to Rödåsel when Ytterrödå got its own post office in Dalarna, and three years later Jenny and Otto Lindberg established their business in the same area. 1927 opened a cooperative grocery shop in "Dalarna," opposite Otto Lindberg's business. A bakery with coffee shop was also in the village at the same time and a carpentry workshop was built.
