= Carl Segerståhl =

Swedish educator and artist (1889–1958)

- Born: 12 May 1899; Norrköping, Östergötland County, Sweden
- Died: 23 May 1958 (aged 59); Vindeln, Västerbotten County, Sweden
- Education: Lund University
- Occupation: Teacher
- Spouse: Sofia Katarina Elisabet Söderblom (m. 1931)

Carl Yngve Segerståhl (12 May 1899 – 23 May 1958) was a Swedish rector and painter. Born in Norrköping in southern Sweden, his initial studies included folkloristics, religion, and economics in Lund, working in archives as a student and collecting folk tales. For almost the entirety of his career, he was a teacher, later headmaster, of the folk high school (a form of tertiary popular education) in Vindeln. Segerståhl was a republican, and a supporter of the constructed language Occidental. In the latter part of his life, he held several exhibitions as an artist, and published a magazine generally concerning Vindeln and its surrounding localities.

== Career ==
Carl Yngve Segerståhl was born on 12 May 1899 in Norrköping, Östergötland. His mother worked as a midwife, and his step-father as a carpenter. Graduating in Norrköping in 1919, he took a degree (Note: Sources disagree whether this was a Candidate of Philosophy or a Bachelor of Arts degree.) in folklore studies, archaeology, history of religion, and economics at the University of Lund. In the 1920s, while studying at Lund, he worked for several years as an assistant to folklorist Carl Wilhelm von Sydow at Kulturen – they were the first staff at the institution.

After graduation, Segerståhl was employed at the folk high school in Hola, where he taught for two years. In 1929, he moved to the Vindeln folk high school, where he worked until his death; as a teacher from 1929 to 1948, and as rector thereafter. As a teacher, he taught in a style similar to that of Nikolaj Frederik Severin Grundtvig, the creator of the folk high school as a form of school system; Grundtvig's methods placed value on religion. Segerståhl's approach to teaching, which was sometimes quite brusque, occasionally brought him into conflict with the Swedish school board. At Vindeln, Segerståhl initiated the university's journal, Vindeln, and spread it towards other villages in Degerfors and several parishes in Västerbotten. Vindeln ran from 1933 to 1965, and was published four times annually – Segerståhl was its publisher from 1933 to 1958, and its editor until 1938. Several articles, including an interview with von Sydow, were written by him; he also contributed original poetry and criticism of literature and art.

== Personal life ==
Sometime in the early 1930s, Segerståhl married Elisabet Söderblom, the daughter of Johan Söderblom, an agricultural consultant from Vindeln. Elisabet was also a teacher in folk high schools and had an interest in folkloristics.

Active as a political radicalist, Segerståhl was an atheist and a republican – on a visit by King Gustaf VI Adolf to Vindeln in the 1950s, he refused to raise the Swedish flag, and took his students swimming in lake Abborrtjärn in preference to paying homage to the king. Along with von Sydow at the Lund folkminnesarkivet and several other folklore researchers across Sweden, Segerståhl was a proponent for the introduction of international auxiliary languages. He published a book entitled The Auxiliary Language Question (Swedish: Hjälpspråksfrågan) in 1933, in which he gave an account of his admiration of Occidental, a naturalistic language created by Edgar de Wahl in 1922. Segerståhl gave courses teaching Occidental in the Vindeln school, teaching twenty the language in 1934, and wrote several articles in and about the language.

Segerståhl had been interested in art since childhood but never received any formal training as an artist. In the late 1930s and 1940s, he began drawing in coloured ink and painting with oil paint. He exhibited as a solo artist twice: in 1942 in Umeå and in 1953 in Norrköping. He also participated in collective exhibitions of art on the theme of constellations. In 1958, a commemorative exhibition of his art was shown in Vindeln. According to the Svenskt konstnärslexikon, Segerståhl's art was initially naturalistic, and later developed into a style more reminiscent of fantasy. He published a memoir, The Paths of Childhood (Barndomens stigar), in 1951. As a folklorist, Segerståhl collected folk tales in the region of Östergötland; he is credited in Reimund Kvideland and Henning K. Sehmsdorf's Scandinavian Folklore and Legend as having collected a story about the thief "Liven".

== See also ==
- Georg Forchhammer, another headmaster Occidentalist
- Anna Sjödin, later headmistress of Vindeln folk high school

== Notes and references ==
=== Sources ===
- Skott, Fredrik (2008). Folkets minnen: traditionsinsamling i idé och praktik 1919–1964 [Memories of the people: collection of tradition in idea and practice 1919-1964] (PDF) (Thesis) (in Swedish). Göteborg: Institutet för språk och folkminnen i samarbete med Göteborgs universitet. ISBN 9789172290495.
- Lundström, Anders (1979). "Carl Segerståhl och Degefors-bygden" [Carl Segerståhl and the Dygefors area]. Västerbotten (3). Västerbottens Museum: 200–205 – via Yumpu.

Preceded by Fredrik Borelius	Rector of Vindeln folk high school 1948–1958	Succeeded by Nils Ståhlberg
