= Grano =

Grano may refer to:

== Places ==
- Granö, Sweden
- Grano, North Dakota, U.S.

== People ==
- Antonino Grano (1660–1718), Italian painter and engraver
- Carlo Grano (1887–1976), Italian Cardinal of the Roman Catholic Church
- Giorgio Gandini del Grano (died 1538), Italian painter
- John Baptist Grano (c. 1692–c. 1748), English trumpeter, flutist, and composer
- Joseph J. Grano Jr. (born 1948), American business executive
- Megan Grano (born 1977/1978), American actor and writer
- Paul Grano (1894–1975), Australian poet and journalist
- Tony Grano (born 1980), American heavyweight boxer

== Other uses ==
- Grano, a subdivision of the currency Maltese scudo
