= List of tallest structures in Sweden =

A list of the tallest structures in Sweden. This list contains all types of structures.

Name	Pinnacle height		Year	Structural type	Use	Town	Coordinates	Remarks
Gungvalamasten	1102 ft	336 m		Guyed Mast	FM-/TV-broadcasting	Karlshamn	56°13′36.99″N 14°46′31.24″E	
Storbergsmasten	1099 ft	335 m		Guyed Mast	FM-/TV-broadcasting	Hudiksvall	61°42′24.81″N 16°51′21.73″E	
Jupukkamasten	1099 ft	335 m		Guyed Mast	FM-/TV-broadcasting	Pajala	67°16′42.32″N 23°13′55.27″E	
Fårhultsmasten	1099 ft	335 m		Guyed Mast	FM-/TV-broadcasting	Västervik	57°43′14.98″N 16°25′36.66″E	
Herrestadmasten	1089 ft	332 m		Guyed Mast	FM-/TV-broadcasting	Uddevalla	58°22′26.56″N 11°49′16.74″E	
Häglareds Transmitter	1089 ft	332 m	1959	Guyed Mast	FM-/TV-broadcasting	Borås	57°43′26.11″N 13°3′21.26″E	Damaged by sabotage 2016
Ervasteby Transmitter	1089 ft	332 m		Guyed Mast	FM-/TV-broadcasting	Motala	58°35′18.29″N 15°5′45.07″E	
Arbrå Transmitter	1086 ft	331 m		Guyed Mast	FM-/TV-broadcasting	Bollnäs	61°29′0.2″N 16°12′44″E	
Brudaremossen-masten	1086 ft	331 m	1980	Guyed Mast	FM-/TV-broadcasting	Gothenburg	57°41′39.54″N 12°3′31.94″E	
Kisa Transmitter	1086 ft	331 m		Guyed Mast	FM-/TV-broadcasting	Kisa	57°57′27.36″N 15°35′22.19″E	
Valö Transmitter	1086 ft	331 m		Guyed Mast	FM-/TV-broadcasting	Östhammar	60°15′46.92″N 18°4′21.11″E	
Änge Transmitter	1083 ft	330 m		Guyed Mast	FM-/TV-broadcasting	Änge	62°30′9.98″N 15°22′39.9″E	
Brattåsmasten	1083 ft	330 m		Guyed Mast	FM-/TV-broadcasting	Östersund	63°6′42.5″N 14°36′0.32″E	
Klockarhöjden Transmitter	1083 ft	330 m		Guyed Mast	FM-/TV-broadcasting	Filipstad	59°40′57″N 14°7′26.01″E	
Överkalix Transmitter	1083 ft	330 m		Guyed Mast	FM-/TV-broadcasting	Överkalix	66°18′4.3″N 22°51′12.73″E	
Bäckefors transmitter	1073 ft	327 m		Guyed Mast	FM-/TV-broadcasting	Bäckefors	58°49′20.36″N 12°12′0.78″E	
Spånsanmasten	1073 ft	327 m		Guyed Mast	FM-/TV-broadcasting	Borlänge	60°22′56.16″N 15°8′18.23″E	
Billingen transmitter	1070 ft	326 m		Guyed Mast	FM-/TV-broadcasting	Skövde	58°24′35.22″N 13°48′48.6″E	
Gävle transmitter	1070 ft	326 m		Guyed Mast	FM-/TV-broadcasting	Gävle	60°37′51.09″N 17°7′45.64″E	
Knaften transmitter	1070 ft	326 m		Guyed Mast	FM-/TV-broadcasting	Lycksele	64°28′49.04″N 18°35′5.28″E	
Prästfäboberget transmitter	1070 ft	326 m		Guyed Mast	FM-/TV-broadcasting	Skellefteå	64°46′26.92″N 20°57′8.32″E	
Storuman transmitte	1070 ft	326 m		Guyed Mast	FM-/TV-broadcasting	Storuman	65°3′54.08″N 16°56′26.34″E	
Älvsbyn Transmitter	1066 ft	325 m		Guyed Mast	FM-/TV-broadcasting	Boden	65°41′16.85″N 21°15′57.14″E	
Bälshult Transmitter	1066 ft	325 m		Guyed Mast	FM-/TV-broadcasting	Emmaboda	56°46′22.81″N 15°34′49.63″E	
Lillhäradsmasten	1066 ft	325 m		Guyed Mast	FM-/TV-broadcasting	Lillhärad, Västmanland	59°38′37.06″N 16°24′2.33″E	
Oskarström Transmitter	1066 ft	325 m		Guyed Mast	FM-/TV-broadcasting	Oskarström	56°47′23.85″N 12°56′16.9″E	
Tåsjö Transmitter	1066 ft	325 m		Guyed Mast	FM-/TV-broadcasting	Tåsjö	64°13′57″N 15°56′8.5″E	
Eldris Transmitter	1063 ft	324 m		Guyed Mast	FM-/TV-broadcasting	Mora	61°1′1.46″N 14°17′43.95″E	also known as Hemulberget transmitter
Längträsk Transmitter	1063 ft	324 m		Guyed Mast	FM-/TV-broadcasting	Haparanda	65°56′15.61″N 23°30′58.71″E	
Nässjö Transmitter	1063 ft	324 m		Guyed Mast	FM-/TV-broadcasting	Nässjö	57°38′36.6″N 14°40′8.46″E	
Orrbergen Transmitter	1063 ft	324 m		Guyed Mast	FM-/TV-broadcasting	Krokek	58°40′35.4″N 16°28′3.82″E	
Brickan Transmitter	1060 ft	323 m		Guyed Mast	FM-/TV-broadcasting	Sveg	61°55′24.72″N 14°18′44.4″E	
FM-/TV-Mast Hörby	1060 ft	323 m	1959	Guyed Mast	FM-/TV-broadcasting	Hörby, Skåne	55°48′22.15″N 13°43′16.03″E	
Julträsk Transmitter	1060 ft	323 m		Guyed Mast	FM-/TV-broadcasting	Arvidsjaur	65°32′00.72″N 18°59′15.94″E	
Lockhyttan Transmitter	1060 ft	323 m		Guyed Mast	FM-/TV-broadcasting	Örebro	59°25′45.48″N 15°2′55.36″E	
Vännäs TV Tower	1060 ft	323 m		Partially guyed Tower	FM-/TV-broadcasting	Vännäs	63°50′25.21″N 19°49′21.54″E	
Nackasändaren	981 ft	299 m	1959	Guyed Mast	FM-/TV-broadcasting	Nacka, Stockholm County	59°17′51.41″N 18°10′22.79″E 59°17′45.95″N 18°10′34.8″E	2 masts
Multrå transmitter	945 ft	288 m	1964	Guyed mast	FM-/TV-broadcasting	Sollefteå	63°15′10.89″N 17°27′1.28″E	Original height: 325 metres, pinnacle fell down in 1988
Blåbärskullen transmitter	860 ft	262 m	1960	Guyed mast	FM-/TV-broadcasting	Sunne	59°50′11.41″N 12°51′59.87″E	was before pinnacle fell down on December 27, 1979 323 metres tall
FM- and TV-mast Grimeton	853 ft	260 m	1966	Guyed Mast	FM-/TV-broadcasting	Grimeton	57°6′31.58″N 12°23′25.76″E	
Finnveden transmitter	853 ft	260 m	1970	Guyed mast	FM-/TV-broadcasting	Bredaryd	57°14′9.36″N 13°43′2.88″E	
Follingbo transmitter	853 ft	260 m	1959	Guyed mast	FM-/TV-broadcasting	Visby	57°35′33.68″N 18°22′22.73″E	
Longwave transmitter Orlunda, Central Mast	820 ft	250 m	1962	Guyed Mast	LF-transmission	Orlunda	58°25′37.2″N 14°58′32.97″E	destroyed in 1970 by lightning
Brunnby transmitter	738 ft	225 m	?	Partially guyed tower	FM-/TV-broadcasting	Uppsala	59°51′22.79″N 17°46′36″E	
Hollstorp transmitter	735 ft	224 m	?	Guyed mast	FM-/TV-broadcasting	Hollstorp	56°51′58.75″N 14°52′57.45″E	
Vislanda transmitter	715 ft	217.9 m	?	Guyed mast	FM-/TV-broadcasting	Vislanda	56°48′32.5″N 14°23′16.43″E	
Kirunavaara transmitter	709 ft	216.1 m	?	Guyed mast	FM-/TV-broadcasting	Kiruna	67°50′01.06″N 20°11′8.71″E	
Stadsberget transmitter	709 ft	216.1 m	?	Guyed mast	FM-/TV-broadcasting	Sundsvall	62°22′3.08″N 17°19′5.36″E	
Sundsvall transmitter	705 ft	215 m	?	Guyed mast	MF-transmission	Sundsvall	62°26′28.73″N 17°20′53.08″E; 62°26′25.14″N 17°21′0.14″E}	2 masts, insulated against ground, demolished in 1996
Gudinge transmitter	696 ft	212 m	?	Guyed mast	VLF-transmission	Gudinge	60°31′27.39″N 18°0′43.89″E	insulated against ground?
Tving transmitter	696 ft	212 m	?	Guyed mast	VLF-transmission	Tving	56°16′30.18″N 15°29′16.29″E	insulated against ground?
Ruda transmitter	696 ft	212 m	?	Guyed mast	VLF-transmission	Ruda	57°7′13.19″N 16°9′11.2″E	insulated against ground, used for VLF-transmissions of Swedish Navy, demolished in 2020
Karlsborg transmitter	689 ft	210 m	?	Guyed mast	VLF-transmission	Karlsborg	58°29′13.24″N 14°28′9.06″E; 58°29′11.72″N 14°28′36.69″E	2 masts, demolished in 2001
Östersund mediumwave transmitter	686 ft	209 m		Guyed Mast	MF-transmission	Östersund	63°06′56.02″N 14°35′52.01″E; 63°06′59″N 14°35′49.99″E}	2 masts, insulated against ground near Brattåsmasten, demolished in 1982
Öresundsbron	668 ft	203.5 m	2000	Bridge	Bridge pillar	Malmö	55°34′27.72″N 12°49′50.75″E 55°34′33.46″N 12°49′24.1″E	
Holmudden transmitter	666 ft	203 m	?	Guyed mast	FM-/TV-broadcasting	Holmudden	57°57′29.54″N 19°20′39.66″E	
Longwave transmitter Orlunda, Ring Masts	656 ft	200 m	1962	Guyed Mast	LF-transmission	Orlunda	58°25′57.7″N 14°58′27.64″E; 58°25′41.32″N 14°57′55.12″E; 58°25′19.93″N 14°58′17.52″E; 58°25′23.36″N 14°59′0.24″E; 58°25′46.66″N 14°59′7.57″E	dismantled
Reftele Vestas V112 Wind Turbines	656 ft	200 m	?	Tower	Wind power plant	Reftele	57°11′38″N 13°38′32″E; 57°11′51″N 13°38′39″E	nacelle height: 144 metres, rotor diameter: 112 metres

== See also ==
- Turning Torso
- List of tallest buildings in Sweden
- Karla Tower
- List of tallest buildings in Scandinavia
