= Vännäs TV Tower =

Vännäs Television Tower
- Vännäsmasten
- Location within Sweden

General information
- Status: Completed
- Type: Partially guyed concrete television tower
- Location: Vännäs, Vännäs Municipality, Västerbotten County, Sweden
- Coordinates: 63°50′25″N 19°49′21″E
- Construction started: 1958
- Completed: 1960

Height
- Height: 323 m (1,060 ft) (rounded-off)

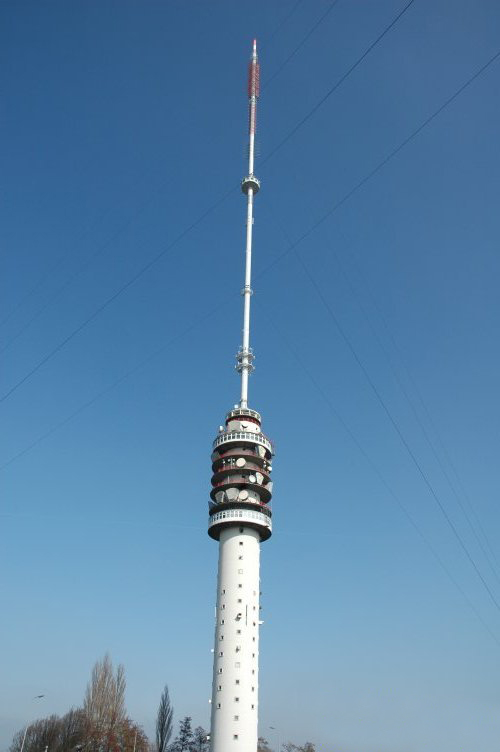
The Vännäs TV Tower, resembles Gerbrandy Tower (pictured).

Vännäs TV Tower (Swedish: Vännäsmasten) is a Swedish concrete television tower that has a mast on top. It is used for transmitting FM-/TV-broadcasting.

The Vännäs TV Tower resembles the Gerbrandy Tower in IJsselstein, the Netherlands. They both are a concrete tower with a steel mast on top that is guyed to the ground. The Gerbrandy Tower is 367 m (1,204 ft) tall, while the Vännäs Tower is shorter at 323 m (1,060 ft) tall.

Vännäs TV Tower was close to collapsing due to heavy icing in 1988. They managed to save the tower by spraying hot water and glycol from a helicopter.

== Geography ==
Vännäs TV Tower lies in the statistical-designated place of Vännäs, which in turn, is the seat of the municipality of Vännäs, in the county of Västerbotten, situated in the northern part of the Kingdom of Sweden.

== See also ==
- Vännäs
- Gerbrandy Tower,
- List of tallest towers in the world
- List of tallest structures in Sweden
