= Rototilt Group AB =

- Company type: Aktiebolag
- Industry: Excavator accessories, main product: tiltrotator
- Founded: 1963
- Headquarters: Vindeln, Västerbotten
- Key people: Anders Jonsson, CEO & Owner
- Revenue: approx 350 million SEK
- Number of employees: ca 130
- Website: www.rototilt.com
- Footnotes / references Statistics from 2012

Rototilt Group AB is a technology company in Vindeln in Västerbotten, Sweden that manufactures tiltrotators to the construction industry.

== History ==
Rototilt Group AB is a spin-out from Indexator, a family company purchased in 1973 by Allan Jonsson, who 10 years previously had founded crane manufacturer Cranab. The focus on tiltrotators began during Jonsson’s time. In 1992 he gained access to the tiltrotator product and the brand of Rototilt – developed by Noreco founded in the 1980s by the Norgren brothers – through acquisition of the bankrupt family company Noreco in Umeå. [1] Rototilt is a tiltrotator that makes excavation, rotation and tilting by the bucket (or other tool intended for excavators) possible in one single movement.

== Operation ==
Around one third is produced for export, with the Nordic region as the principal market. The company and its subsidiaries in Germany, Finland and North America. All production takes place in the 6000 m^{2} factory in Vindeln opened in the fall of 2007. On March 2, 2015 the company changed its name to Rototilt Group AB.

== Sources ==
- Svenskt Näringsliv (Swedish)
- Byggeteknik (Danish)
