= Yvette Hermundstad =

Swedish sports journalist (born 1971)

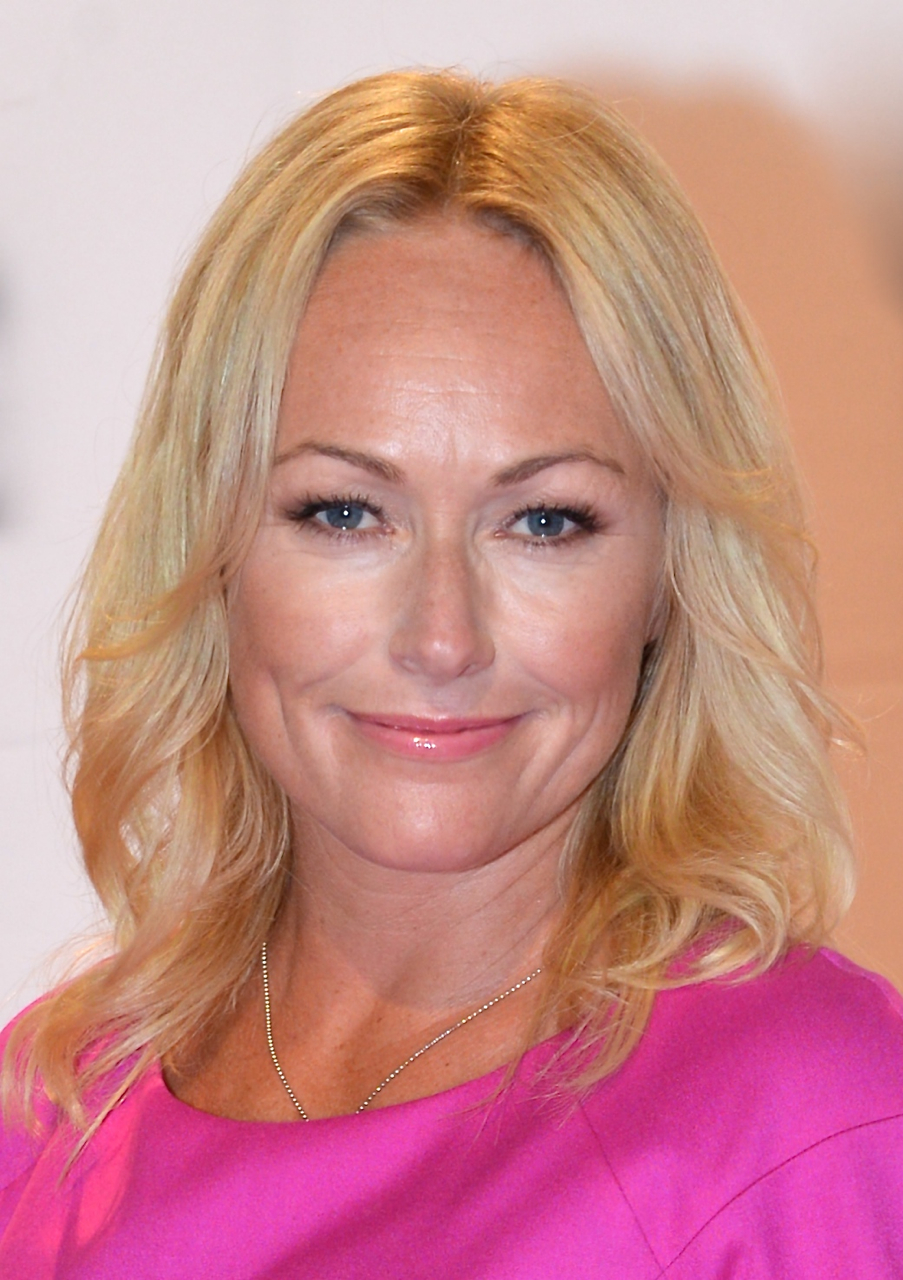
- Yvette Hermundstad in August 2014
- Born: Maria Yvette Pettersson; 1 October 1971 (age 54); Östersund, Sweden
- Occupations: Presenter, sports journalist

Maria Yvette Hermundstad, née Pettersson (born 1 October 1971) is a Swedish sports journalist and presenter of SVT Sport at SVT.

== Career ==
She started her career in 1993 at the sports department at TV4, she stopped working there in 2000 to start working for SVT. She has presented Lilla Sportspegeln where she has interviewed Zlatan Ibrahimović ahead of the shows 25th anniversary. Hermundstad has also worked for Vinterstudion a winter sports show on SVT along with André Pops, she has covered the 2010 Winter Olympics in Vancouver and the 2012 Summer Olympics in London. She has also presented the broadcasts from Nordea Masters, the DN Gala, Finnkampen, and in 2010 she presented "Chef of the Year" competition.

In 2012, she presented the nature show Mitt i naturen which was broadcast on SVT, and in 2013 she presented Mitt i naturen - vår a special edition of the show.
