= Bisse Wahlin =

Swedish botanist (1917–2007)

Bertil "Bisse" Wahlin (1917–2007) was a Swedish television personality and botanist.

== Career ==
Wahlin became known for the SVT show Mitt i naturen during the 1980s. Prior to his television work, he served at Linköping's Plant Protection Institute from 1940 to 1970.

Wahlin's later career involved roles in various nature-related radio and TV programs. He authored multiple books, wrote for industry periodicals, and was awarded an honorary doctorate by Linköping University.
