= Västerbottens Museum =

Coordinates: 63°49′44″N 20°17′19″E

Västerbottens museum
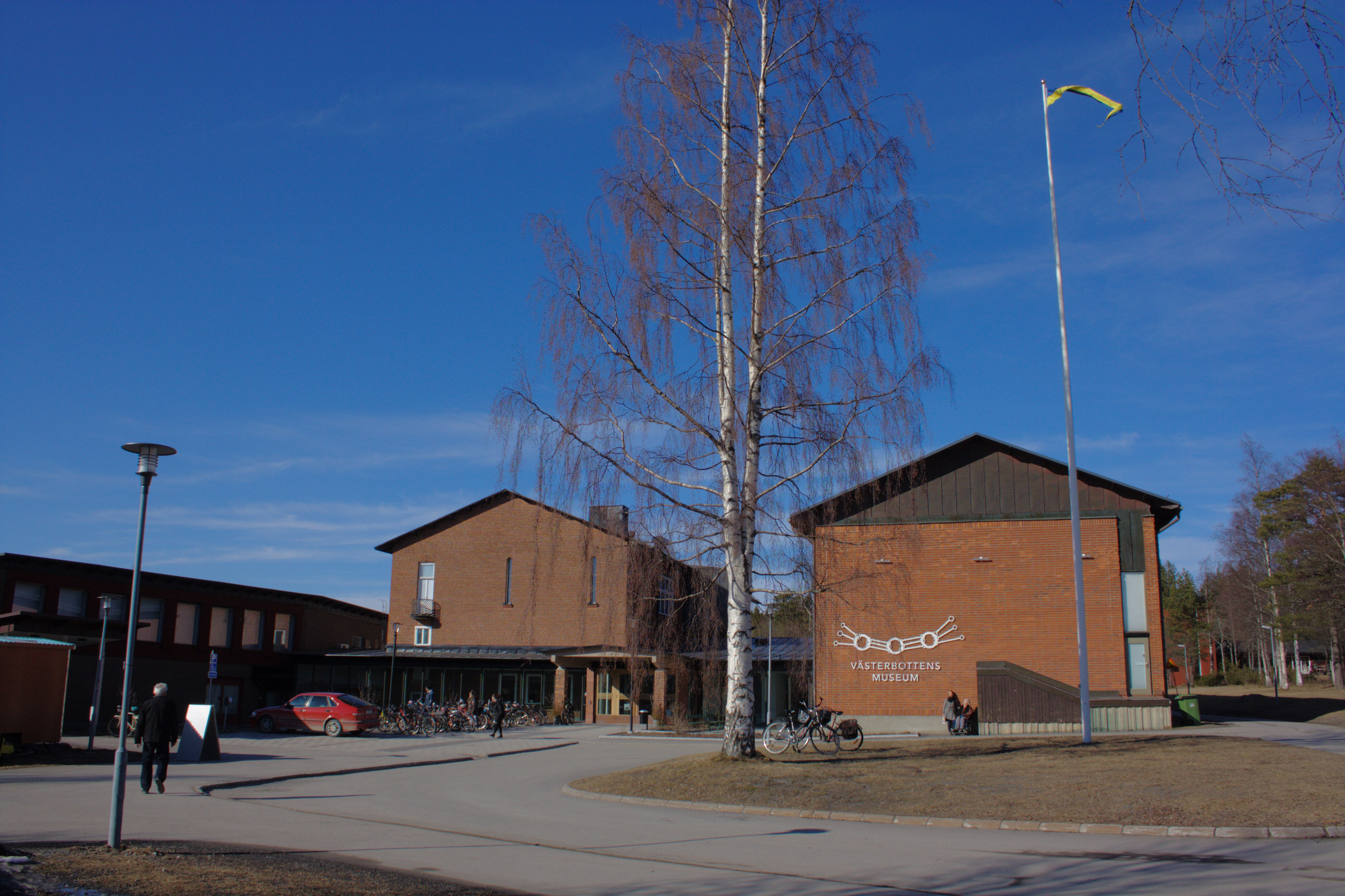
- Museum photographed in March 2014.
- Established: 1886
- Location: Umeå, Sweden
- Type: County museum
- Visitors: 229,000 (2009)
- Director: Ulrica Grubbström
- Website: www.vbm.se

Västerbottens museum in the Gammlia area of Umeå, Sweden is a county museum with responsibility for the cultural history of Västerbotten County. The museum consists of the Gammlia open-air museum, a ski exhibition (previously the Swedish Ski Museum), an exhibition of Fishing and Maritime (previously the Fishing and Maritime Museum), the popular movement archive of Västerbotten County and a number of Sami camps. The museum is working all over Västerbotten County with, amongst other things, numerous contract activities, mainly in the archaeological field. The museum produces the quarterly journal Västerbotten for the Västerbotten County district association.

== The open-air museum with Sami camps ==
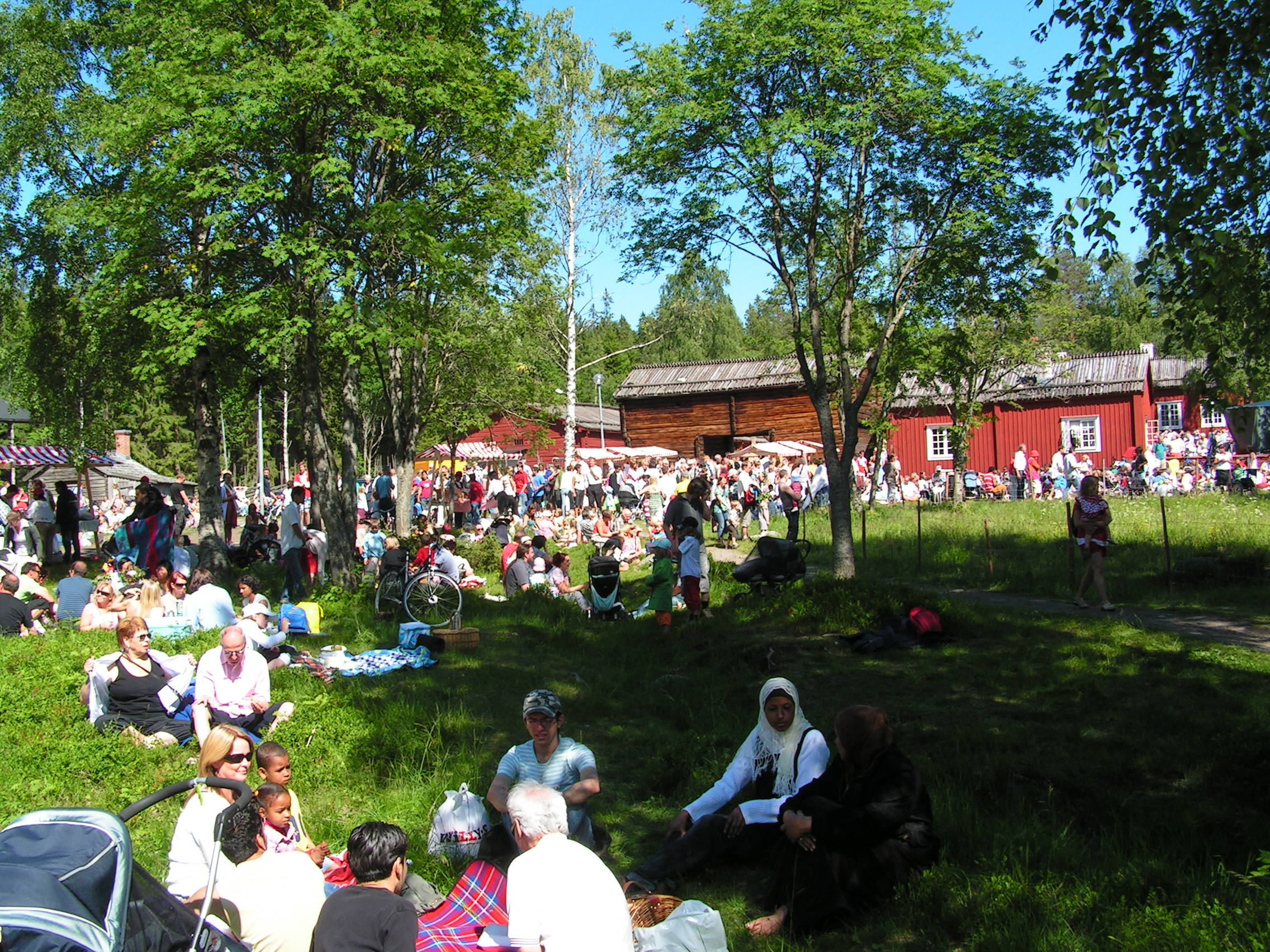
Midsummer celebrations at the open-air museum.

Gammlia is an open-air museum that is an integrated part of the Västerbottens museum. The open-air museum has a collection of historical buildings and organizes activities to showcase what Västerbotten looked like in historical times. The buildings that can be viewed at Gammlia have been brought together from different parts of the county; including Helena Elisabeth Church, a manor house, a windmill, an 18th-century farmhouse, a school, a blacksmith shop and a number of Sami camps. During summertime Swedish native breeds of horses, cows, sheep, pigs and chickens are on display in the open-air museum. Among the daily activities are butter churning, baking bread tunnbröd, crafts and handicrafts. The farms are open for viewing from mid-June to late August, and during the annual Christmas market. The outdoor area is always open to visitors.

The name Gammlia is based on Gamli, which was the winning entry in a naming contest that the historical society organized in conjunction with Gammlia's completion. Gammlia is a dialectal pronunciation meaning "the old hillside" (compare with the standard swedsih equivalent "Den gamla liden").

== History ==
The Västerbotten County Antiquarian Society reached a decision at a meeting in January 1886 that "as a storage room for antiquities a museum shall be established in Umeå." It was initially located in the Ullbergska property in what nowadays is the block Thor on Storgatan. The Southern department's collection of objects were completely destroyed by the great city fire in Umeå on 25 June 1888, when most of the city was destroyed.

In 1901, the establishment relocated to the newly built grammar school. Due to the increasing size of the collection, the museum moved to the large warehouse by the city port in 1911. From the very start the local historical society, which was formed in 1919, was working for the establishment of a museum building in the Gammlia area. The building was completed in 1939.

Between 1921 and 1990, various older buildings from Västerbotten County were moved to the area. The original plan was to have a farm from the northern part of the county and one from the south, but because of high costs it was instead decided to compile some buildings from the north and some from the south of Västerbotten into a single farm.

In 1928, a ski museum was inaugurated in a ski jump tower in the recreational area Fiskartorpet at Norra Djurgården in Stockholm. In 1963, the collections were moved to the Swedish Ski Museum in Umeå. One of the museum's artefacts is the world's oldest ski.

The main building of Västerbottens museum was designed by the architect Bengt Romare and was constructed in 1943.

The museum has since expanded several times and one of the largest expansions in 1981 made it possible for Bildmuseet – a contemporary art museum of Umeå University – to move in. In 2012, Bildmuseet relocated to a new building on the Umeå Arts Campus and Västerbottens museum was thus able to expand in its previous premises.

The museum's logo consists of a reproduction of a bronze link from a thousand year old Sami burial in Vargviken, next to the Vindel River.
