= Linda Olofsson (TV journalist) =

Swedish TV-journalist

Linda Olofsson (born 24 May 1973 in Vännäs, Västerbotten) is a Swedish TV-journalist. She is currently co-hosting the debate show Argument on SVT together with Helena Wink, and was earlier the hostess of Mitt i naturen, succeeding Charlotte Permell. She was later succeeded by Martin Emtenäs.

== Family ==
She is the daughter of the famous Sweden TV-journalist Sverker Olofsson.
