= Hällnäs =

- Location within Västerbotten Location within Sweden
- Coordinates: 64°18′30″N 19°37′30″E
- Country: Sweden
- Province: Västerbotten
- County: Västerbotten County
- Municipality: Vindeln Municipality

Area
  - Total: 1.17 km^{2} (0.45 sq mi)

Population (31 December 2010)
  - Total: 259
  - Density: 222/km^{2} (570/sq mi)
- Time zone: UTC+1 (CET)
  - Summer (DST): UTC+2 (CEST)

Hällnäs (Swedish pronunciation: [ˈhɛ̌lːnɛs]) is a locality situated in Vindeln Municipality, Västerbotten County, Sweden with 259 inhabitants in 2010.
