= Vännäs Municipality =

Vännäs Municipality Vännäs kommun
- Municipality
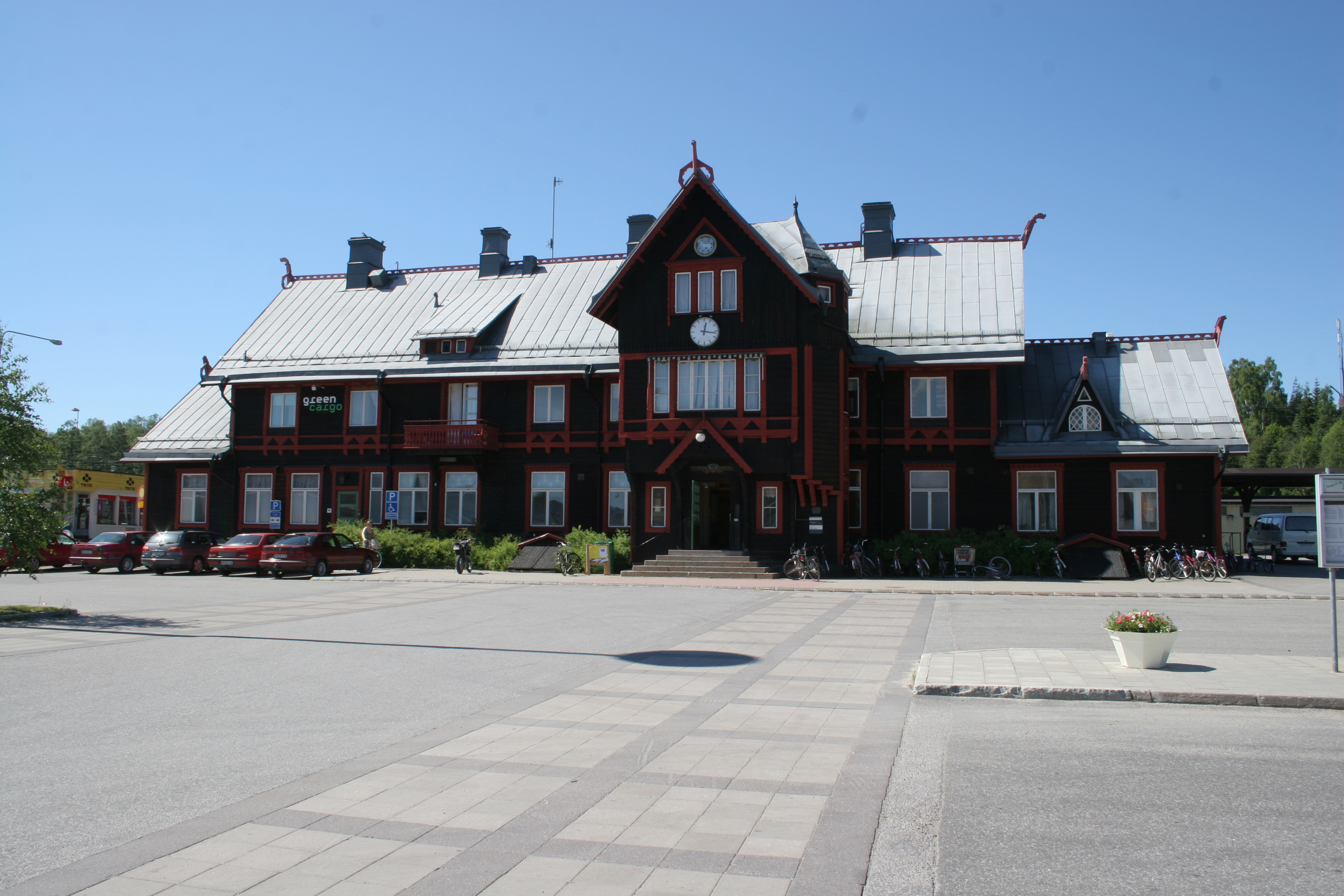
- Vannas Railway Station

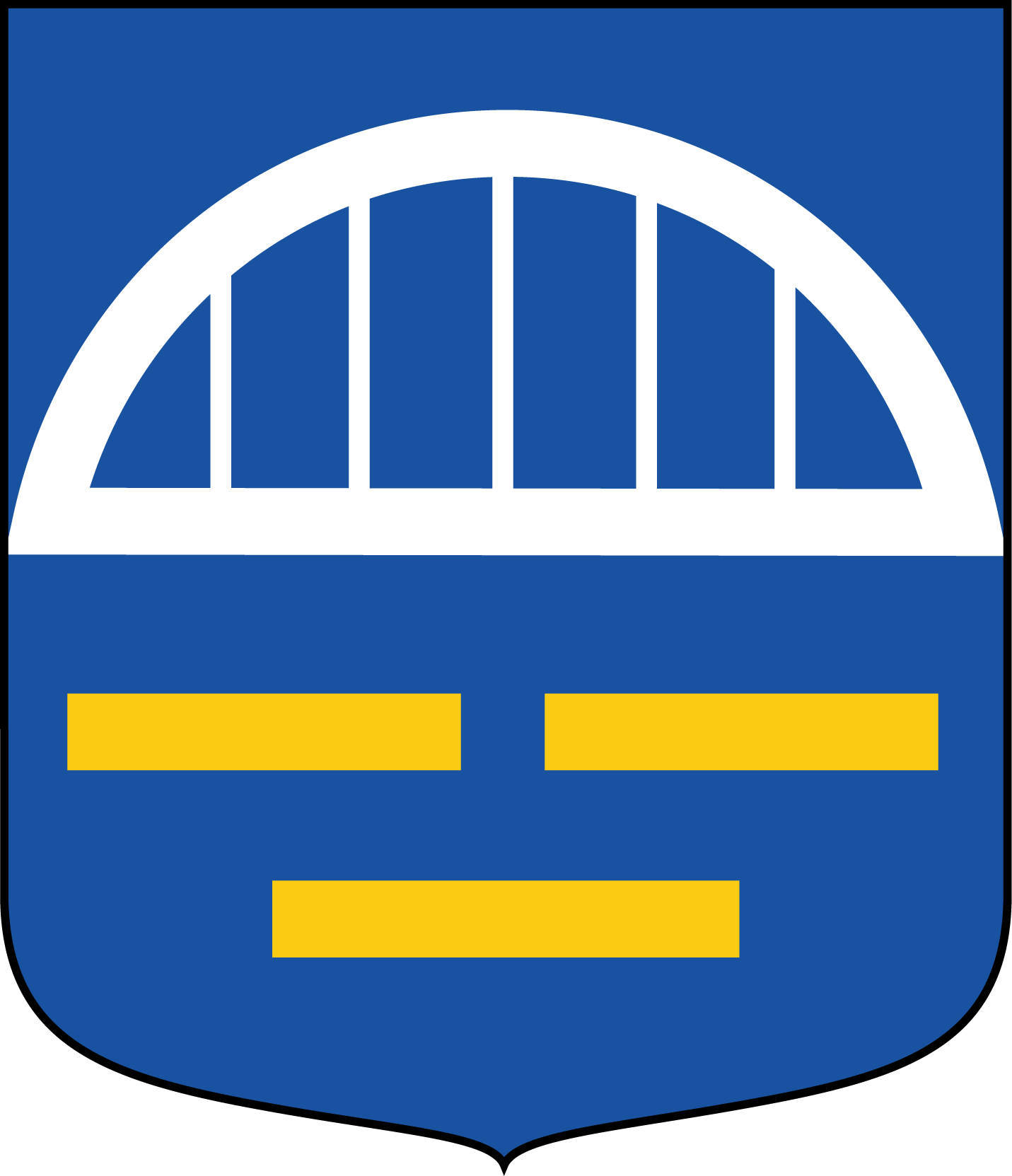
- Coat of arms

- Coordinates: 63°55′N 19°45′E
- Country: Sweden
- County: Västerbotten County
- Seat: Vännäs

Area
  - Total: 553.7 km^{2} (213.8 sq mi)
  - Land: 529.49 km^{2} (204.44 sq mi)
  - Water: 24.21 km^{2} (9.35 sq mi)
- Area as of 1 January 2014.

Population (30 June 2025)
  - Total: 9,140
  - Density: 17.3/km^{2} (44.7/sq mi)
- Time zone: UTC+1 (CET)
  - Summer (DST): UTC+2 (CEST)
- ISO 3166 code: SE
- Province: Västerbotten
- Municipal code: 2460
- Website: www.vannas.se

Vännäs Municipality (Swedish: Vännäs kommun) is a municipality in Västerbotten County in northern Sweden. Its seat is located in Vännäs.

== History ==
In 1928 the locality Vännäs was detached from the rural municipality with the same name, forming the market town (köping) of Vännäs. The two entities were reunited in 1971. In 1974 Bjurholm Municipality was added. A split took place in 1980 when Bjurholm Municipality was re-established.

== Geography ==
The municipality is located just west of Umeå Municipality, where Umeå is the seat, with about 110,000 inhabitants, and it is part of the Umeå region. This is evident considering that the municipality has 1,500 people commuting to Umeå Municipality and about 400 commuters from Umeå Municipality. Its neighbouring municipalities Vindeln Municipality, Bjurholm Municipality and Nordmaling Municipality only receive a total of about 100 commuters from Vännäs Municipality and Vännäs Municipality receives a total of 200 commuters from them.

=== Localities ===
There are two localities (or urban areas) in Vännäs Municipality:

| # | Locality | Population |
|---|---|---|
| 1 | **Vännäs** | 4,486 |
| 2 | Vännäsby | 1,644 |

The municipal seat in bold

== Demographics ==
This is a demographic table based on Vännäs Municipality's electoral districts in the 2022 Swedish general election sourced from SVT's election platform, in turn taken from SCB official statistics.

In total there were 9,042 residents, including 6,699 Swedish citizens of voting age. 58.2% voted for the left coalition and 40.5% for the right coalition. Indicators are in percentage points except population totals and income.

| Location | Residents | Citizen adults | Left vote | Right vote | Employed | Swedish parents | Foreign heritage | Income SEK | Degree |
| Location | | | % | % | | | | | |
|---|---|---|---|---|---|---|---|---|---|
| Lägret-Nyby | 1,873 | 1,297 | 59.2 | 39.7 | 81 | 89 | 11 | 25,571 | 35 |
| Myran-Centrum | 2,044 | 1,522 | 59.5 | 39.2 | 77 | 82 | 18 | 21,903 | 34 |
| Vännäsby | 1,695 | 1,260 | 56.8 | 42.2 | 86 | 95 | 5 | 27,113 | 48 |
| V byarna-Älvdala | 1,729 | 1,369 | 59.1 | 39.1 | 83 | 91 | 9 | 24,100 | 32 |
| Östra byarna | 1,701 | 1,251 | 57.5 | 41.1 | 92 | 94 | 6 | 28,215 | 46 |
Source: SVT

== See also ==
- Blue Highway, tourist route (Norway - Sweden - Finland - Russia)
