= Frank Björklund =

Swedish artist (born 1960)

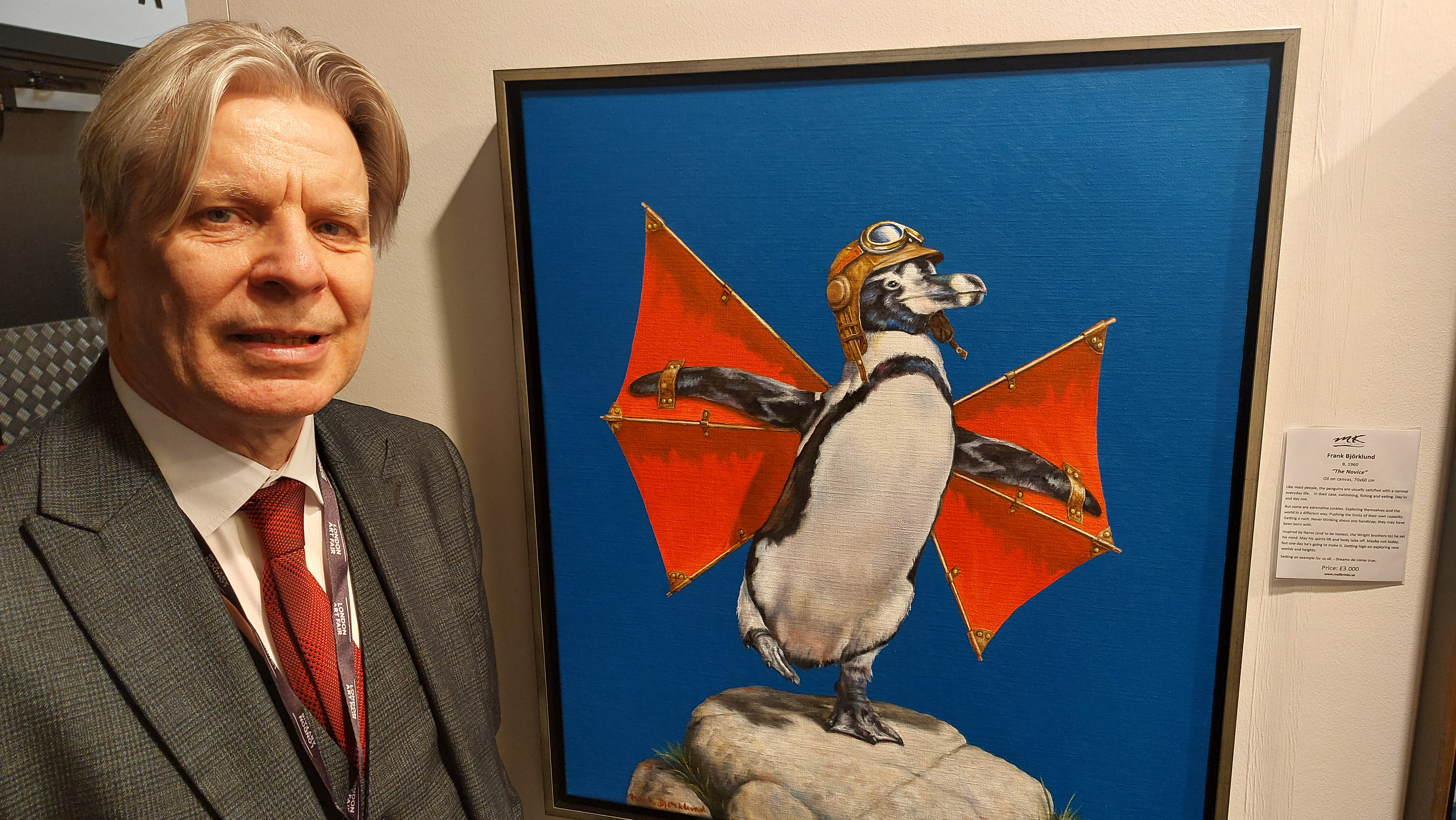
- Frank Björklund at the Mollbrinks Gallery stand during the London Art Fair in 2025
- Born: Frank Rune Benny Björklund; 1960 (age 65–66); Vännäs, Sweden
- Education: Ålsta Graphic School
- Known for: Surrealism
- Style: Surrealist
- Awards: Royal King, Carl XVI Gustaf Art Award; 1987
- Website: frankbjorklund.se

Frank Björklund (born 1960) is a Swedish surrealist painter, printmaker and sculptor.

== Career ==
Björklund studied at a college in Härnösand (1976–79) and at the Ålsta Graphic School (1983–84). He has participated in exhibitions since 1983. In 1987, he won the Royal King, Carl XVI Gustaf Art Award. Björklund's influences include Salvador Dalí, Marcel Duchamp, and René Magritte. In 1997, he exhibited at the Liljewalchs Art Museum in Stockholm. In 2007, he exhibited at Art on 99 (Sollefteå), Galleri Miva (Malmö), and Örebro Castle. In 2013, he exhibited in Figure Variations at the Walter Wickiser Gallery (New York) and Ragarpers Gallery (Simrishamn). His solo exhibitions include Art as Visual Sound Bites by Frank Björklund (Art and More Gallery, 2018), Surrealist master Frank Björklund (Mollbrinks Gallery, Kungshamn, 2024). and Frank Björklund – A Swedish surrealist master! (Mollbrinks Gallery, Uppsala, 2024). Björklund has lived in the Stockholm area and later Ystad.

== Bibliography ==
- Moestedt, Camilla. "Franks talande bilder" [Frank's telling pictures]. Grodingekonstnären (in Swedish).
