= Vännäsby =

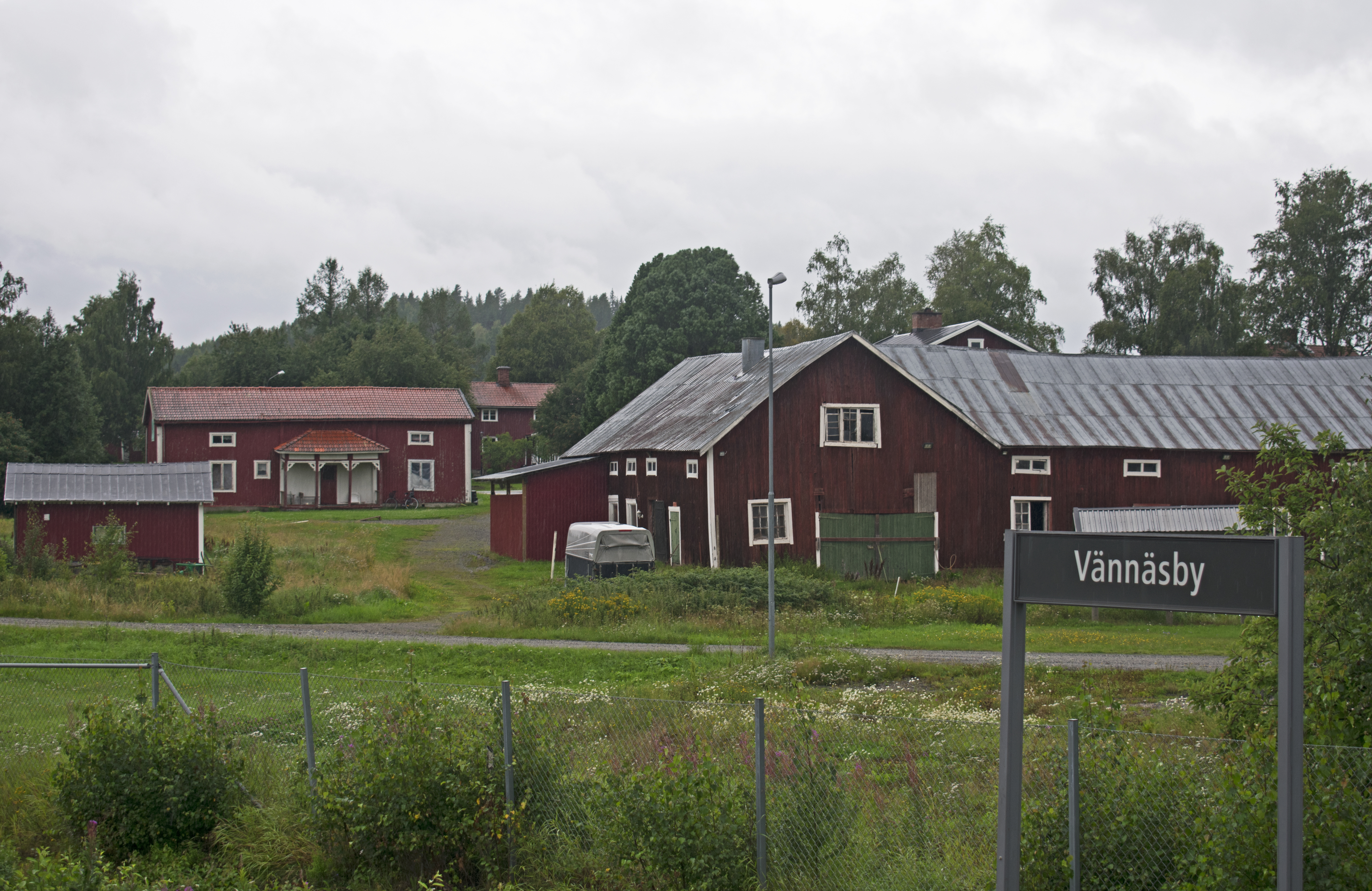
- Buildings northwest of the railway station

- Location within Västerbotten Location within Sweden
- Coordinates: 63°54′46″N 19°49′6″E
- Country: Sweden
- Province: Västerbotten
- County: Västerbotten County
- Municipality: Vännäs Municipality

Area
  - Total: 1.87 km^{2} (0.72 sq mi)

Population (31 December 2010)
  - Total: 1,552
  - Density: 830/km^{2} (2,100/sq mi)
- Time zone: UTC+1 (CET)
  - Summer (DST): UTC+2 (CEST)

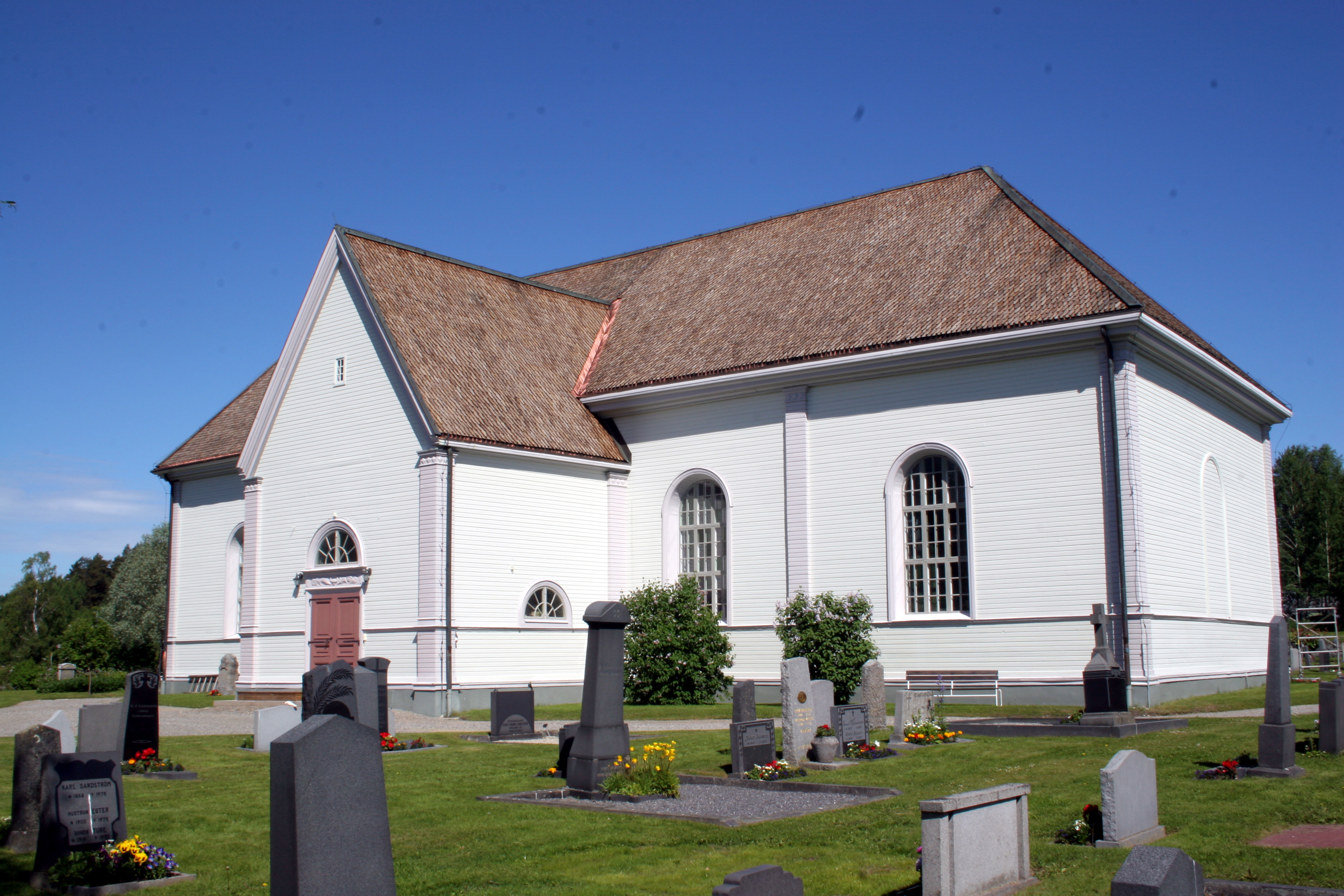
Vännäs church, Vännäsby

Vännäsby is a locality situated in Vännäs Municipality, Västerbotten County, Sweden with 1,552 inhabitants in 2010. In Vännäsby, the Vindel merges with the Ume.
