= Vindeln Municipality =

Vindeln Municipality Vindelns kommun
- Municipality
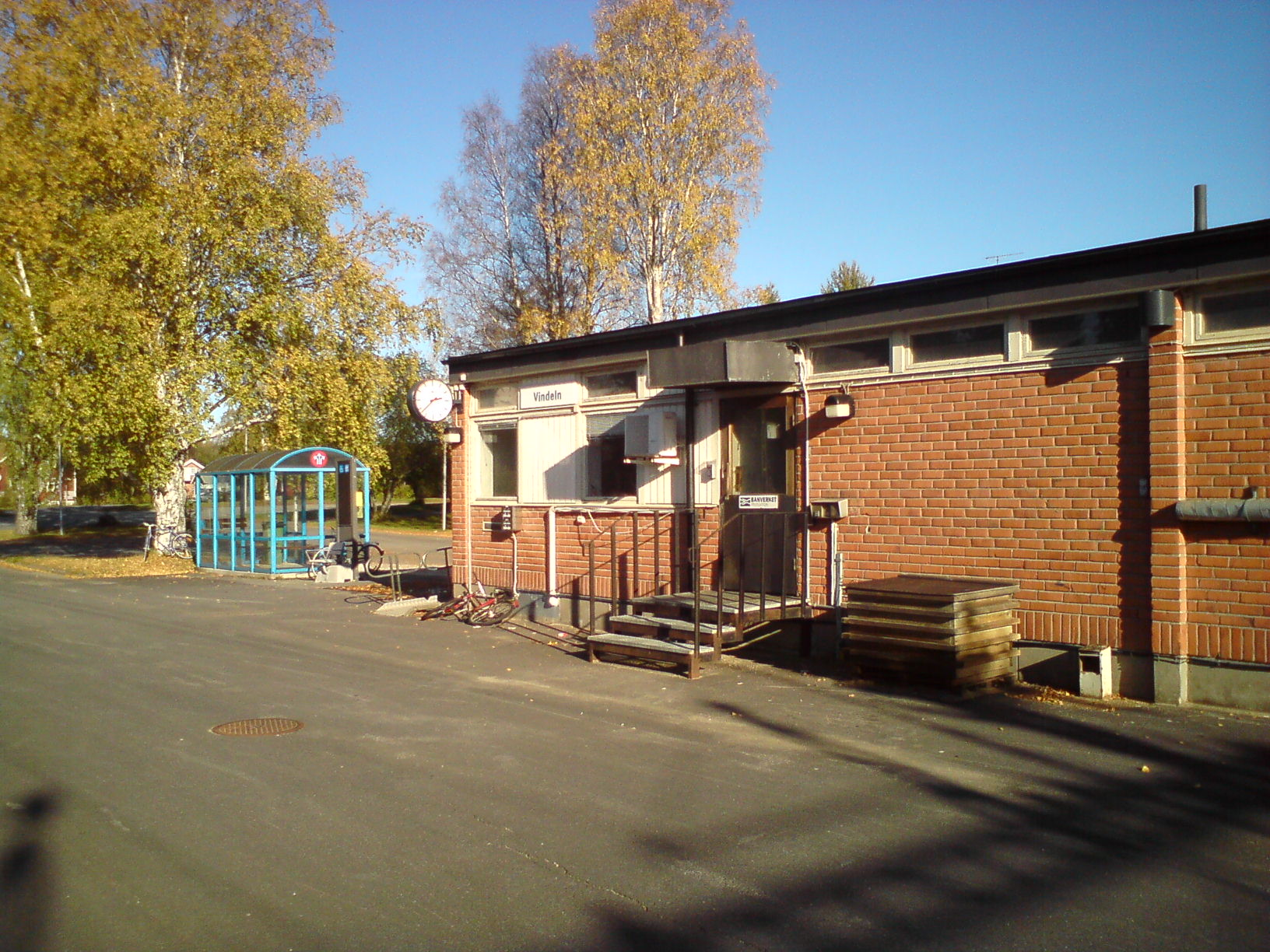
- Vindeln Railway Station

- Coat of arms

- Coordinates: 64°12′N 19°43′E
- Country: Sweden
- County: Västerbotten County
- Seat: Vindeln

Area
  - Total: 2,846.11 km^{2} (1,098.89 sq mi)
  - Land: 2,629.37 km^{2} (1,015.21 sq mi)
  - Water: 216.74 km^{2} (83.68 sq mi)
- Area as of 1 January 2014.

Population (30 June 2025)
  - Total: 5,454
  - Density: 2.074/km^{2} (5.372/sq mi)
- Time zone: UTC+1 (CET)
  - Summer (DST): UTC+2 (CEST)
- ISO 3166 code: SE
- Province: Västerbotten
- Municipal code: 2404
- Website: www.vindeln.se

Vindeln Municipality (Swedish: Vindelns kommun) is a municipality in Västerbotten County in northern Sweden. Its seat is located in Vindeln.

== History ==
In 1971 a local government reform was implemented in Sweden. This municipality was, however, not amalgamated with any other. But in preparation for the reform the name was changed in 1969 from Degerfors Municipality to Vindeln Municipality. The reason was that there is another Degerfors Municipality (in Örebro County), and every municipality in Sweden should have a unique name.

== Geography ==
The Vindel River, which is the main tributary of the Ume River, runs through the municipality and has given it its name. The municipality's coat of arms depicts a salmon, of which there are plenty in the river.

=== Localities ===
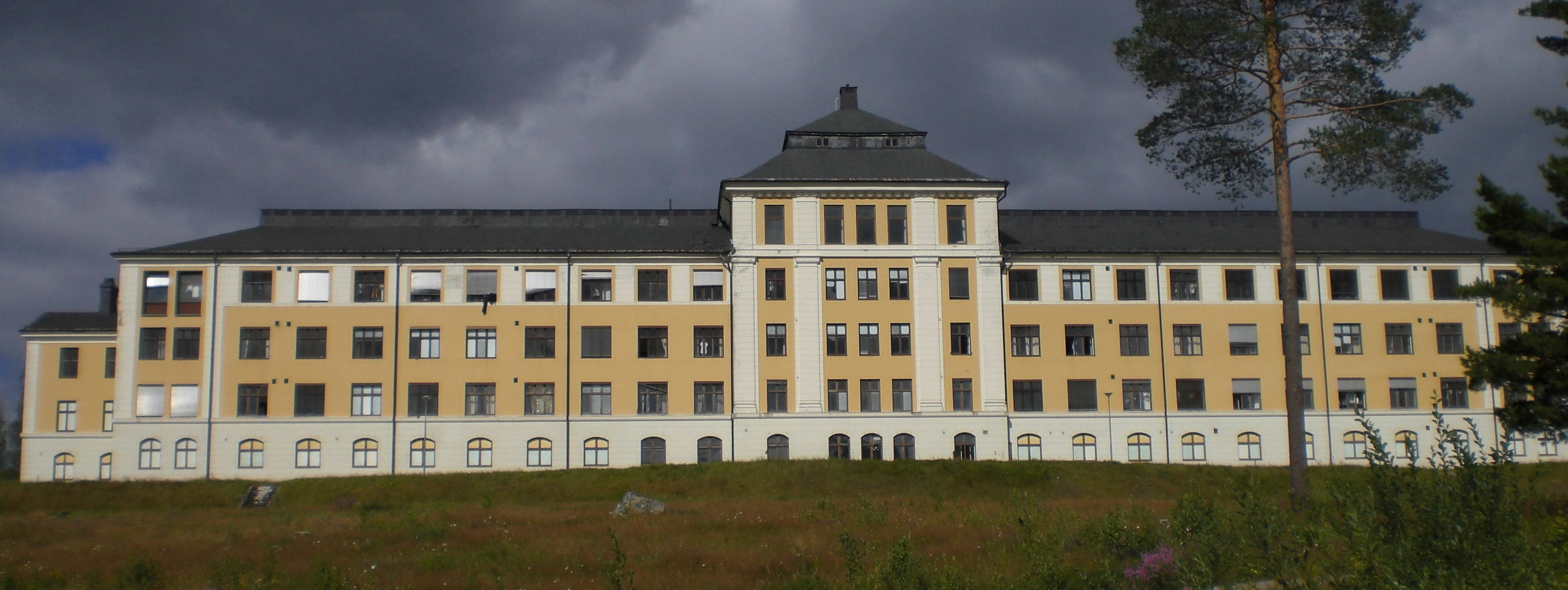
Hällnäs Sanatorium.

There are five localities (or urban areas) in Vindeln Municipality:

#	Locality	Population
1	**Vindeln**	2,356
2	Hällnäs	309
3	Tvärålund	271
4	Granö	261
5	Åmsele	201

The municipal seat in bold

== Demographics ==
This is a demographic table based on Vindeln Municipality's electoral districts in the 2022 Swedish general election sourced from SVT's election platform, in turn taken from SCB official statistics.

In total there were 5,546 residents, including 4,091 Swedish citizens of voting age. 51.8 % voted for the left coalition and 47.1 % for the right coalition. Indicators are in percentage points except population totals and income.

Location	Residents	Citizen adults	Left vote	Right vote	Employed	Swedish parents	Foreign heritage	Income SEK	Degree
Location			%	%					
Hällnäs	1,046	789	54.5	44.0	79	85	15	21,537	29
Tvärålund	1,324	1,010	43.6	55.5	87	93	7	25,225	28
Vindeln V	1,286	942	52.5	46.9	84	88	12	24,234	31
Vindeln Ö	1,890	1,350	57.0	42.0	79	83	17	22,589	34
Source: SVT
