= Sverker Olofsson =

Swedish television personality

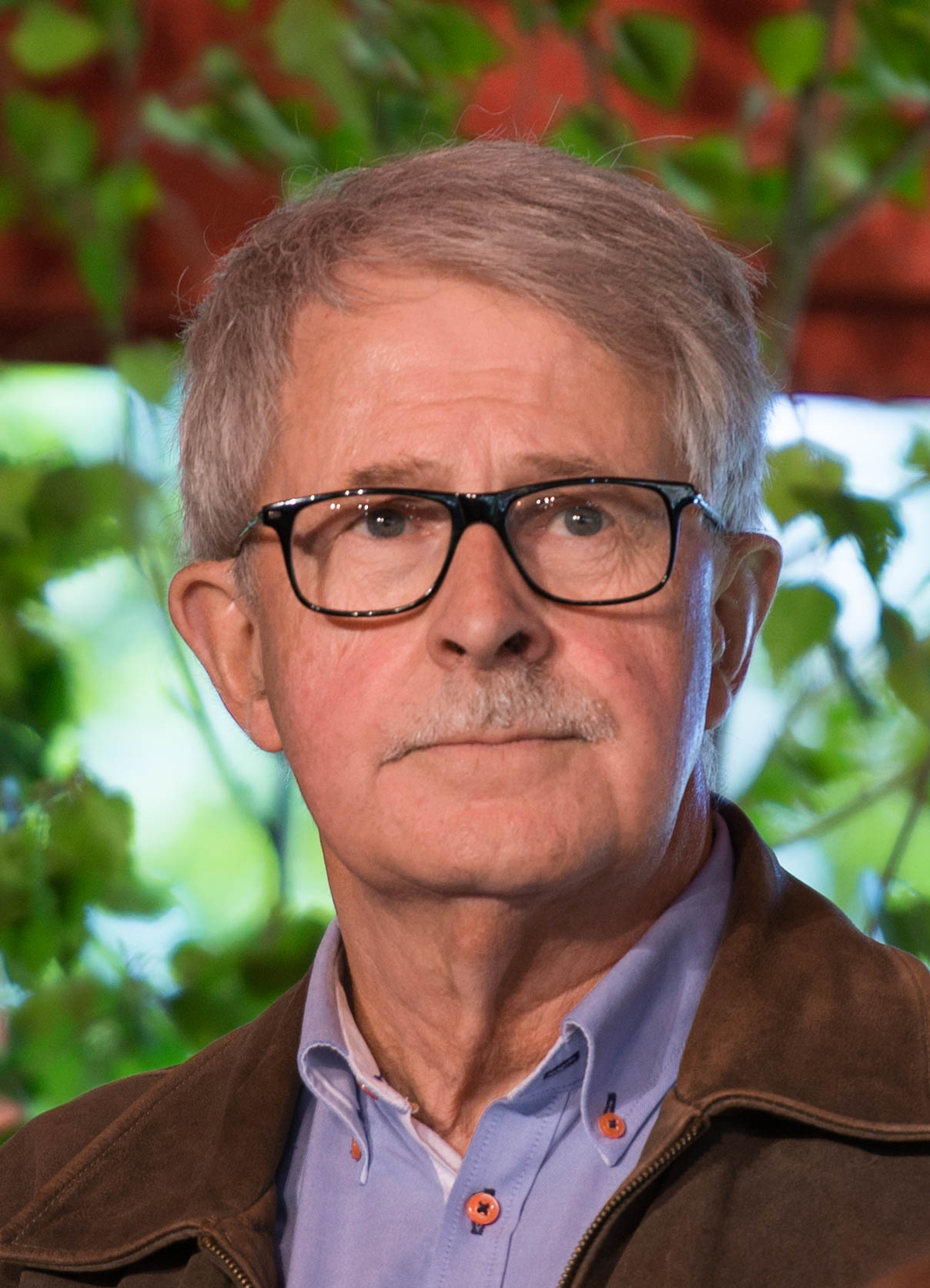
Sverker Olofsson

Sverker Olofsson (born April 14, 1947 in Vännäs, Västerbotten), is a Swedish TV-personality. He has led the consumer show Plus since 1987 on SVT, and is one of their most well-known faces, appearing in a series of advertisements for SVT and was in 2006 a part of the Swedish election survey called Karavanen. He has also appeared on the consumer issues program 24 Konsument. In 2009 he was awarded the Lukas Bonnier Great Journalist Award.

He is the father of TV-journalist Linda Olofsson, who also works at SVT.
