= Tvärålund =

- Location within Västerbotten Location within Sweden
- Coordinates: 64°06′N 19°41′E
- Country: Sweden
- Province: Västerbotten
- County: Västerbotten County
- Municipality: Vindeln Municipality

Area
  - Total: 0.81 km^{2} (0.31 sq mi)

Population (31 December 2010)
  - Total: 257
  - Density: 319/km^{2} (830/sq mi)
- Time zone: UTC+1 (CET)
  - Summer (DST): UTC+2 (CEST)

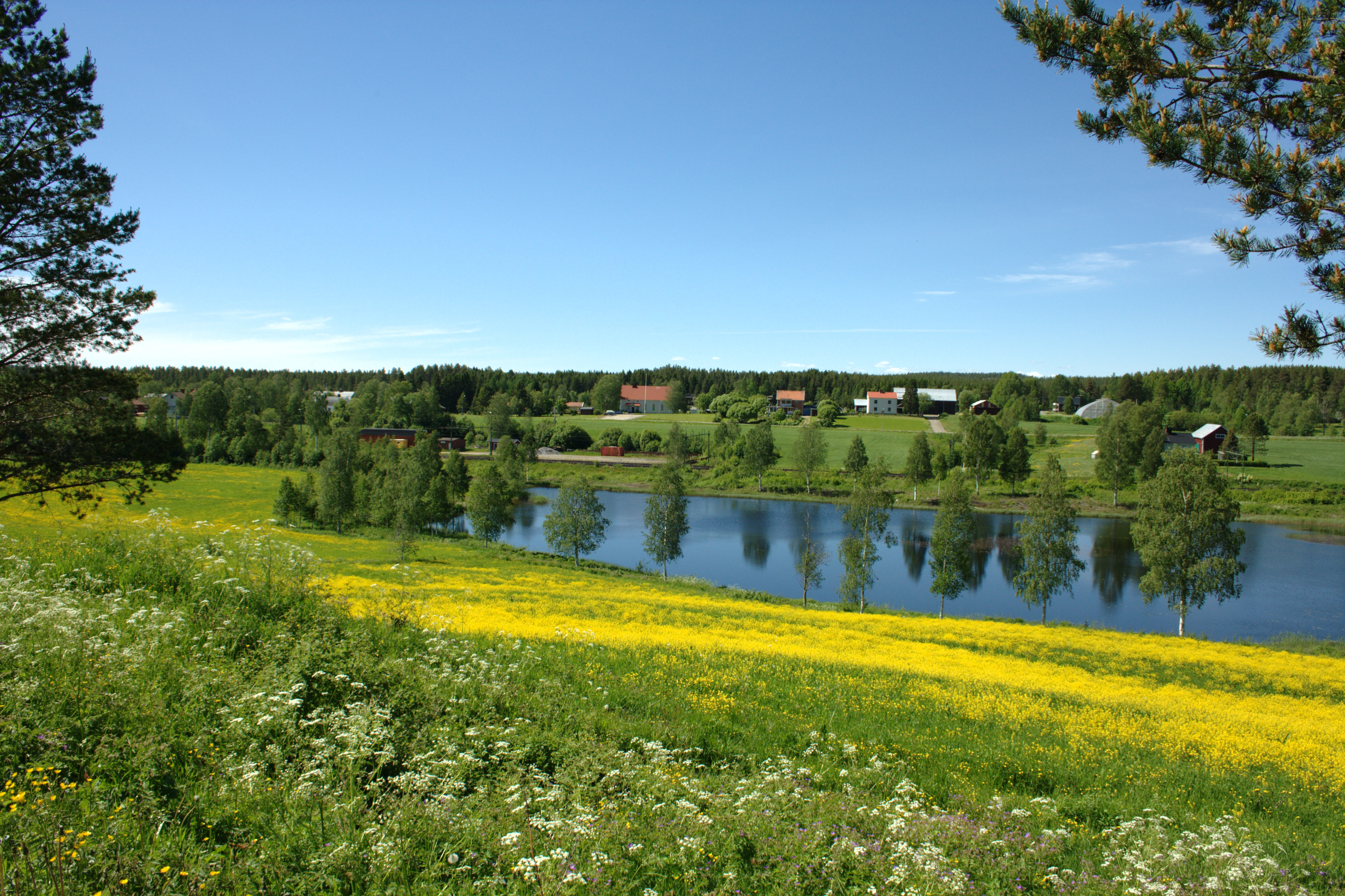
The northern part of Tvärålund

Tvärålund is a locality situated in Vindeln Municipality, Västerbotten County, Sweden with 257 inhabitants in 2010.
