= Multrå transmitter =

Broadcasting facility in Sweden

Coordinates: 63°15′11″N 17°27′04″E

Multrå transmitter is a facility for FM-/TV-broadcasting near Sollefteå in Sweden.

It uses a guyed mast, which was built in 1964. This mast had before 1988 a height of 325 metres (1,066 ft).

On February 7, 1988 the pinnacle collapsed as result of excessive icing. The lower parts of the mast remain standing and were repaired afterwards. The height of the mast was reduced to 288 metres (945 ft).

The ruins of the pinnacle is today a monument close to the transmission site.

== See also ==
- List of tallest structures in Sweden
