= Charlotte Permell =

Swedish journalist

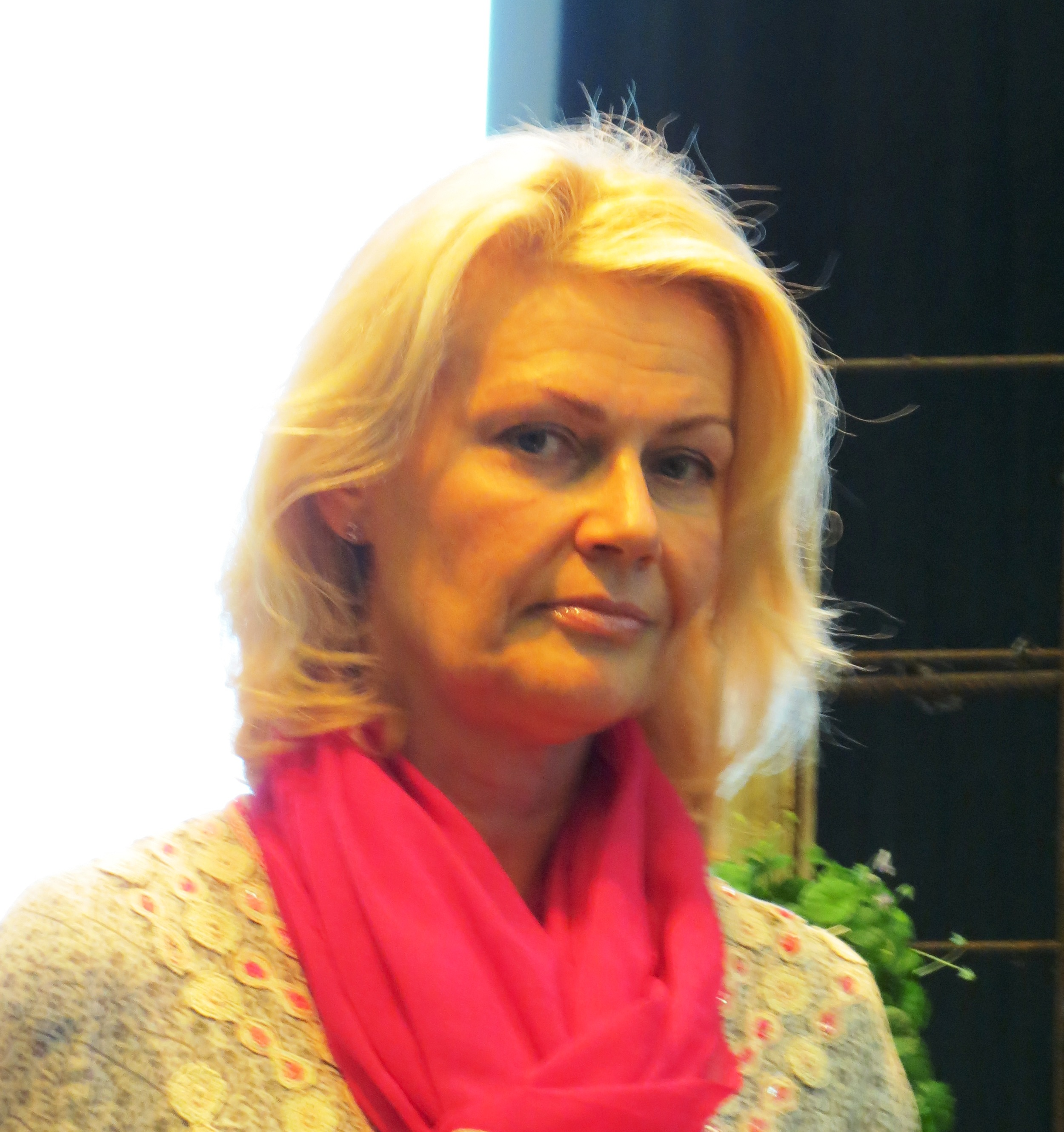
Charlotte Permell

Charlotte Permell (born 8 July 1963) is a Swedish journalist and TV-reporter, formerly presenter of the nature shows Mitt i naturen (lit. In the Midst of Nature) and Mitt i naturen - Film on SVT. She was succeeded as presenter of Mitt i naturen by Linda Olofsson.
