= Helena Elisabeth Church =

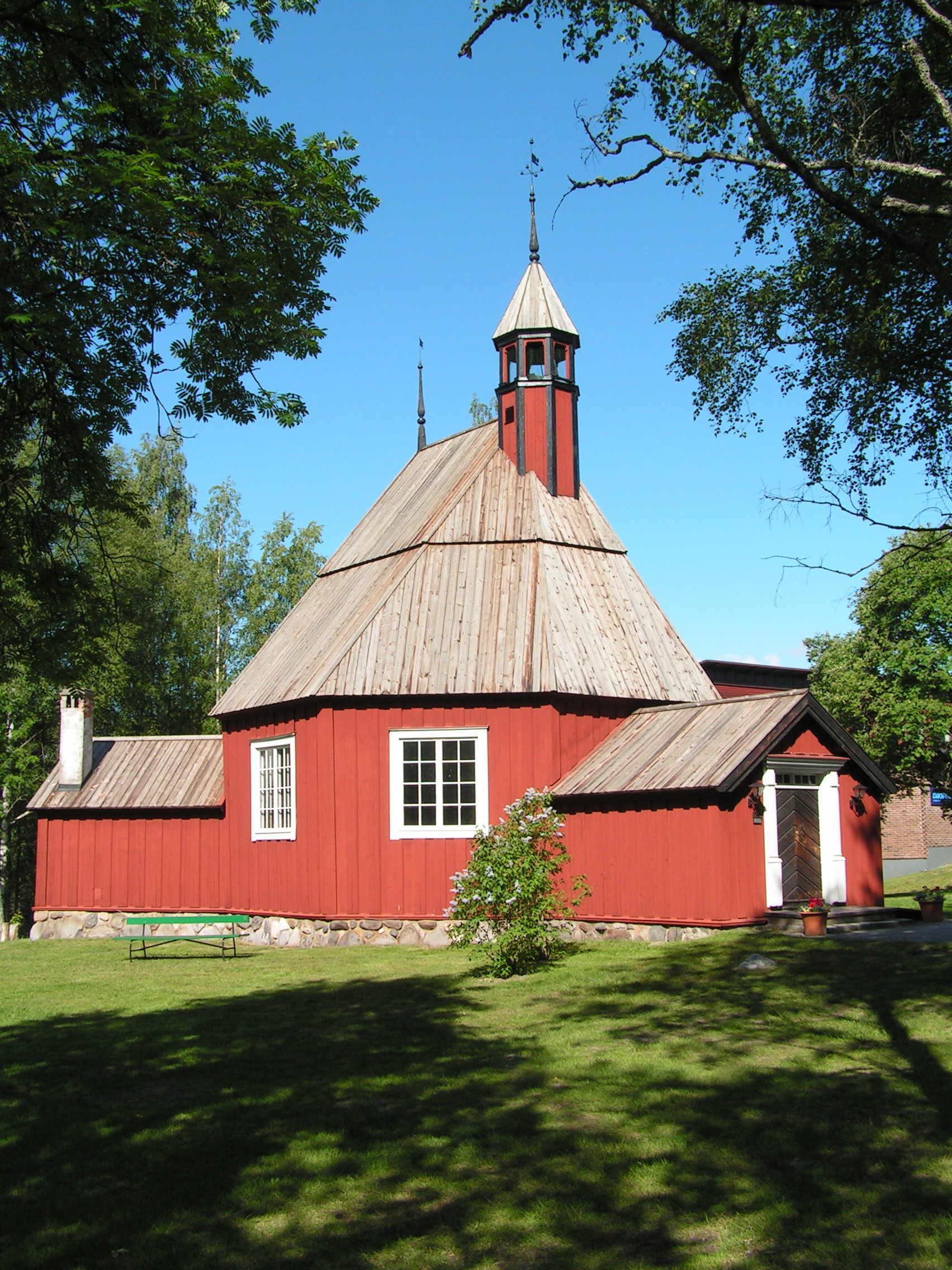
- Helena Elisabeth Church
- Helena Elisabeth Church
- 63°49′43″N 20°17′22″E
- Location: Umeå
- Country: Sweden
- Denomination: Church of Sweden

Helena Elisabeth Church was built on one of the largest islands of the Holmöarna group near Umeå in northern Sweden. Decades after the church was replaced with a larger building, in the 1950s the structure was moved to Västerbottens museum where it is still a church and an exhibit.

== History ==
The Helena Elisabeth Church was originally built in 1802 on the largest island of the Holmöarna group near Umea. This was the first church in the area, and it was required because the population could not travel to the mainland to worship. The church was named for Helena Elisabeth Grahn from Umeå who contributed the cost of the communion silver. Oscar Hultgren of Stockholm was commissioned to paint here. The church was decorated in a simple fashion, and did not have any heating until 1970.

The church building served as the local church until 1891 when a larger church was built. Until 1955 this church was used for various secular purposes, including use as a sheep barn.

The church building was sold to the local priest, Sigfrid Landin; in 1955 he sold the building to Västerbottens museum who had the building rebuilt at the external Gammlia museum. The church was rededicated as a church in 1958.
