= Nackasändaren =

Coordinates: 59°17′46″N 18°10′33″E

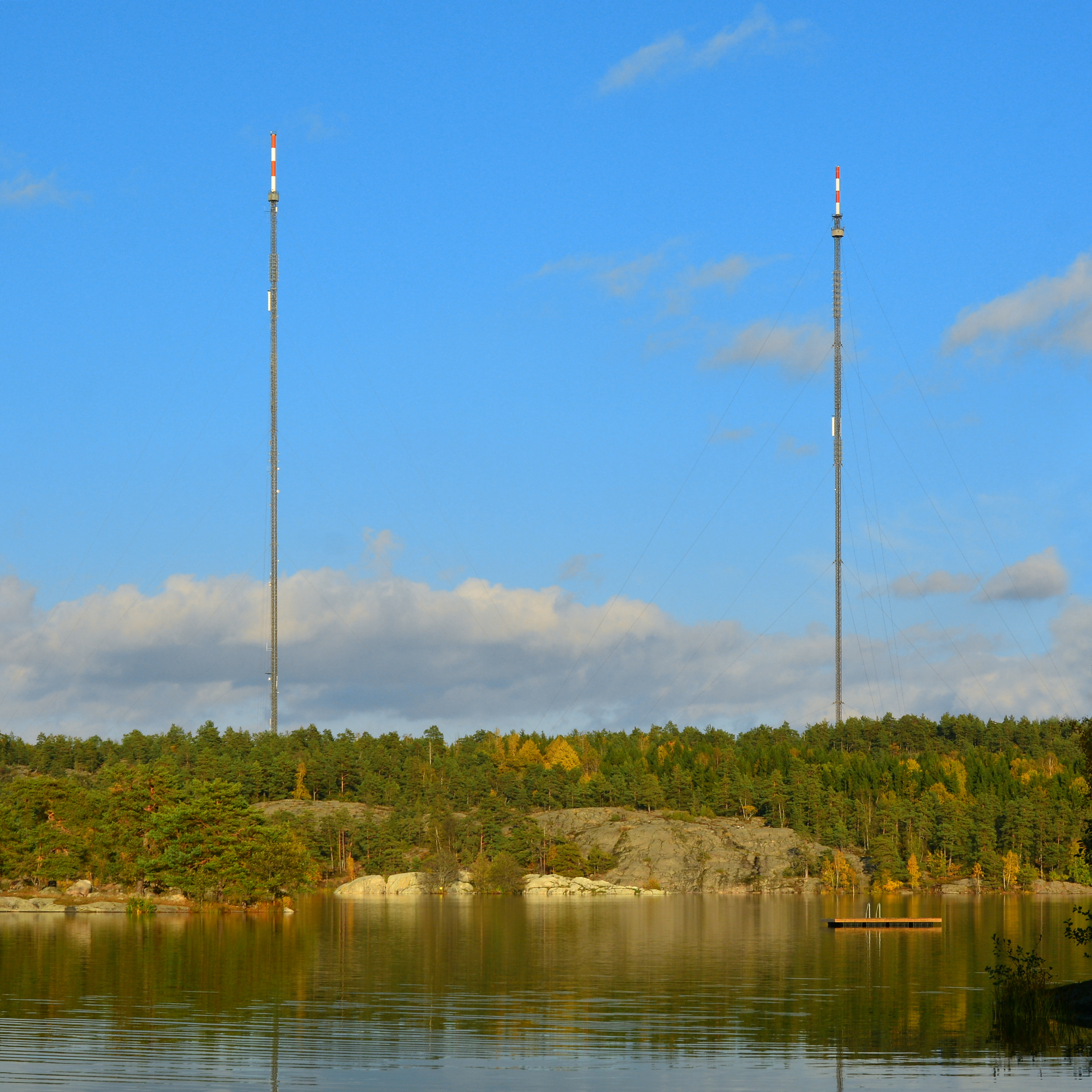
The masts at Nackasändaren with the lake Källtorpssjön in the foreground.

Nackasändaren (colloquially known as Nackamasterna) is a facility for FM and TV transmission at Nacka in Metropolitan Stockholm. It used from 1956 to 1983 two 160-metre-high (520 ft) guyed masts, which were designed as mast radiators for mediumwave transmission and therefore insulated against ground. In 1965 a further mast, a 299-metre-tall (981 ft) guyed steel lattice mast for FM and TV-transmissions was built. This mast is in opposite to the lower masts grounded, but carried in its upper guys insulators in order not to disturb the radiation pattern of the mediumwave transmitter. After termination of the AM transmissions, which occurred until 1978 on 773 kHz and after 1978 on 774 kHz on June 1, 1981, the old masts were demolished on November 2, 1983, and December 7, 1983. At their location a second 299-metre-tall (981 ft) steel framework mast for FM and TV transmission was built in 1984. After cancellation of the mediumwave transmission, the insulators of the guys of the older 299 metres tall mast were obsolete and removed.

== See also ==
- Radio masts and towers
- List of masts
- List of tallest structures in Sweden
