= Megan Grano =

American actress

- Born: 1977 or 1978 (age 47–48)
- Education: University of North Carolina
- Occupations: Actress, writer

Megan Grano is an actress and writer known for her work in This Is 40 (2012), Veep (2012) and Jimmy Kimmel Live! (2003).

== Life ==
Megan Grano began performing as a member of Second Suburb, her sketch comedy troupe at high school. At her first year in University of North Carolina (where she studied journalism) in 1995, she founded another comedy troupe named Chapel Hill Players (CHiPs). After moving to Chicago when she traveled after college, studied, performed, and taught improv and sketch at iO, the Annoyance, and many other small theaters. For 3 years, she toured with The Second City National Touring Company and wrote an original show with the cast of Second City's Girls' Night Out before joining the Second City in 2008.

In Los Angeles, she has worked extensively as an actress, writer, and coach. She has appeared and worked on numerous TV shows and films including Bridesmaids and This Is 40, worked on the writing staff on Jimmy Kimmel Live!, and performed with Jim Belushi and the Board of Comedy as well as locally in Los Angeles with various independent groups.

She appeared in the 2007 U.S. Comedy Arts Festival in Aspen with her sketch show The Ragdolls: MOIST and, also in 2007, won The Oxygen Network's National "Create a Series" Webisode Competition. In 2011, she started to work at The BreakWomb as a co-founder.

In 2015, she was listed as one of BBC's 100 Women.

== Works ==
=== TV ===
- Weeds
- Parks and Recreation
- Hot in Cleveland
- Family Guy
- The Mindy Project
- American Dad!
- The Tonight Show with Conan O'Brien
- The Great State of Georgia

=== Filmography ===
- Bridesmaids
- This Is 40

=== Stage ===
- Thunderpussy (Annoyance Theatre)
- GrabAss (Annoyance Theatre)
- Armando Diaz (iO Theater)
- Virgin Daiquiri (iO Theater)
- The Second City Chicago
- U.S. Comedy Arts Festival
- iO Chicago
- iO West
