= Holmöarna =

Island group in Umeå, Sweden

Coordinates: 63°43′N 20°51′E

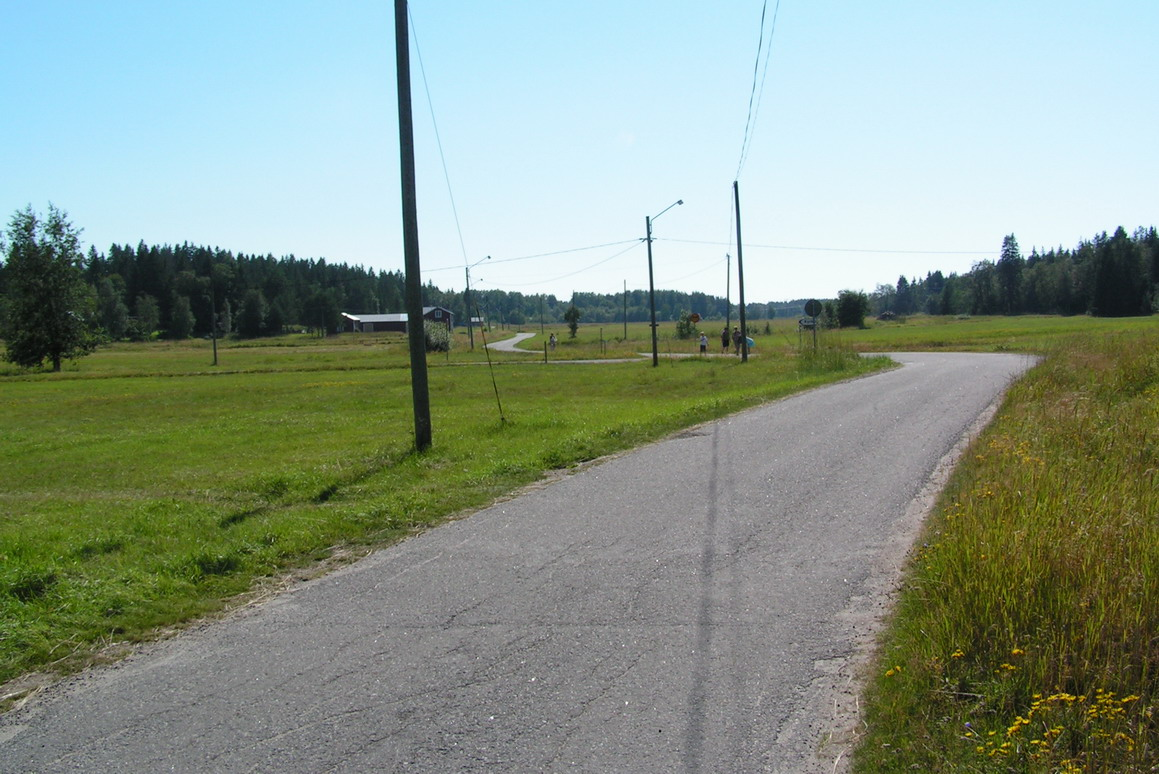
The main road connecting Holmön and Ängesön.

Holmöarna (Swedish, literally the islet islands) is an island group in the Kvarken narrows of the Gulf of Bothnia between Sweden and Finland. The islands form part of Umeå Municipality in Västerbotten County. The islands have 75 year-round inhabitants and the largest islands are Holmön, Ängesön, Grossgrunden, Holmögadd and Lilla and Stora Fjäderägg. Large areas of the islands have been set aside as nature reserves.

== Nature and geography ==
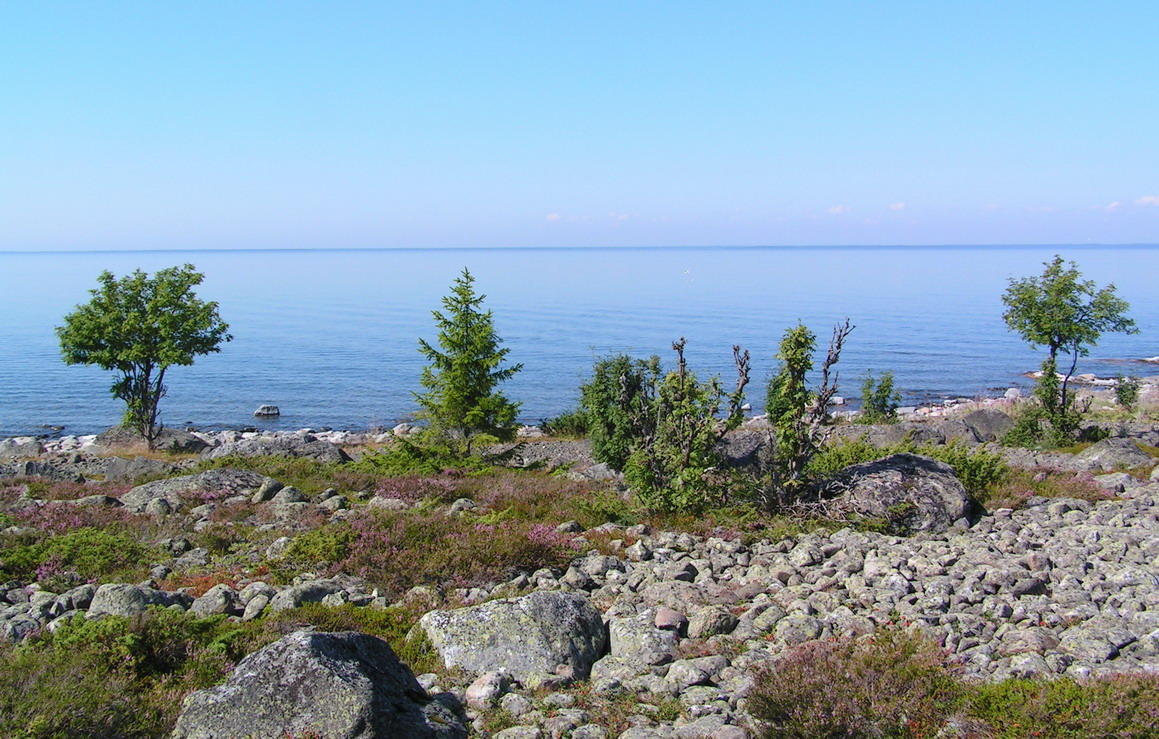
The coast of Holmön island with the mainland showing as a narrow line on the horizon

The islands are situated in the Norra Kvarken narrows between the Bothnian Sea to the south and the Bothnian Bay to the north. Holmöarna's nature is quite diverse with areas covered in forest, bogs and lakes, and the islands have a rich birdlife. The islands' natural life is so special that the whole of Holmögadd, Stora Fjäderägg and Grossgrunden, nearly all of Ängesön and the eastern half of Holmön and all waters surrounding these have been protected as a nature reserve since 1980, incidentally the largest island nature reserve in Sweden. The reserve has been designated an Important Bird Area (IBA) by BirdLife International.

Many of the lakes and pools on Holmöarna are former bays and inlets which were severed from the sea due to the rising of the underlying land mass by about 8.5 mm (approx. ⅓") each year. Strandbjerget, the islands' highest point at 25.83 meters above sea level, is found at Holmöns northern end.

=== Holmön ===
Holmön (in the local dialect: Höḷmöʸn) is the main island of the group and is still largely covered in spruce forest. The preserved main village of Holmö By is surrounded by open fields separated by narrow bands of woodland and stone walls with the occasional heap of cleared rocks.
The main part of Holmö By was built alongside Hallen esker, and about 20 farms adjoin the road leading south through cultivated moorland. The village has a church and primary school as well as a fire station and a trade cooperative offering groceries, alcoholic beverages and petrol as well as apothecary, library and postal services.

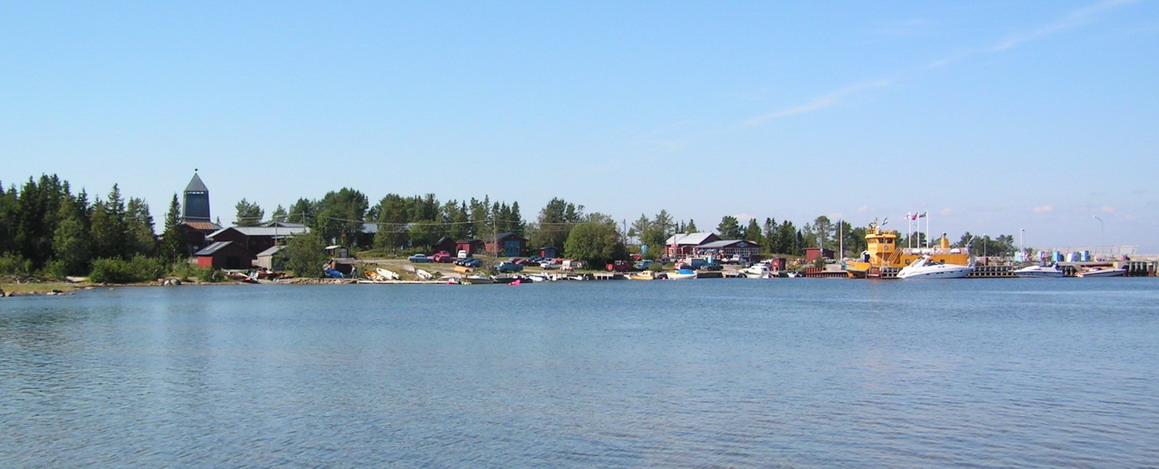
Byviken village with the yellow ferry to the right and the Ship Museum to the left

Byviken village on the northwestern tip of Holmön hosts the islands' ferry and marina facilities. The Ship Museum is also located here, as well as a tourist information centre, restaurant, bathing beach and the Holmögården youth hostel. Berguddens fyrplats is a locality 3 km (2 mi) southwest of Byviken sporting a lighthouse from 1896 and some lighthouse keepers' cabins now converted to a hostel. Gäddbäckssundet ("Jäbbäckssundet" in local dialect) is a sound located to the southeast of Holmön, separating it from the island of Ängesön, and offering a secure anchorage.

=== Ängesön ===
Ängesön island is slightly bigger than Holmön, with many cut-off inlets, pools, and bogs from which reed used to be cut. The road leading from Byviken, through Holmö By, terminates near Grossgrunden on Ängesön's southern tip.

=== Grossgrunden ===
Grossgrunden (from Old Norse grjót meaning "rock" and grund meaning "bottom") was once an area of dangerous rocky shallows, but due to the post-glacial rebound it is now a proper island surrounded by outlying islets.

=== Stora Fjäderägg ===
An islet northeast of Holmön with a lighthouse, bird conservation centre and a hostel. The island is an important resting point for migratory birds on their way to Asia and Africa. The southern half of the island has a number of ancient stone markings shaped in the form of labyrinths and compass roses, from the days Stora Fjäderägg was a fishing and sealing base. The former lighthouse keeper's residence now houses a youth hostel.

=== Holmögadd ===
Holmögadd, separated from Grossgrunden by Gaddströmmen sound, forms the southernmost tip of the Holmöarna islands. The island is best known for its lighthouse named Holmögadd dating from 1770. The entire island was a military shooting range from 1940, which was recently dismantled.

== Climate ==
The Swedish weather service SMHI operates a weather station at Holmön. The local climate is very much influenced by the sea and as a result is a marine type of the humid continental climate regime with temperatures similar to coastal areas of Newfoundland in Canada, but with less snow and rainfall. It could be described as the northernmost continental zone in the world under the Köppen classification due to the cooler winters than Atlantic Norway and warmer Septembers than less marine inland areas.

Climate data for Holmön (2002–2018); extremes since 1901; sunshine Umeå Airport
Month	Jan	Feb	Mar	Apr	May	Jun	Jul	Aug	Sep	Oct	Nov	Dec	Year
Record high °C (°F)	8.0 (46.4)	7.0 (44.6)	11.6 (52.9)	15.1 (59.2)	25.9 (78.6)	25.6 (78.1)	30.8 (87.4)	29.3 (84.7)	24.5 (76.1)	15.5 (59.9)	10.0 (50.0)	8.9 (48.0)	30.6 (87.1)
Mean maximum °C (°F)	3.1 (37.6)	3.1 (37.6)	6.6 (43.9)	11.3 (52.3)	18.0 (64.4)	21.2 (70.2)	24.7 (76.5)	23.7 (74.7)	18.3 (64.9)	12.0 (53.6)	7.4 (45.3)	5.1 (41.2)	25.4 (77.7)
Mean daily maximum °C (°F)	−2.3 (27.9)	−2.7 (27.1)	0.4 (32.7)	4.9 (40.8)	10.5 (50.9)	15.5 (59.9)	19.7 (67.5)	18.8 (65.8)	14.1 (57.4)	7.6 (45.7)	3.4 (38.1)	0.6 (33.1)	7.5 (45.6)
Daily mean °C (°F)	−4.6 (23.7)	−5.3 (22.5)	−2.6 (27.3)	2.1 (35.8)	7.3 (45.1)	12.4 (54.3)	16.7 (62.1)	16.0 (60.8)	11.7 (53.1)	5.7 (42.3)	1.7 (35.1)	−1.3 (29.7)	5.0 (41.0)
Mean daily minimum °C (°F)	−6.9 (19.6)	−7.9 (17.8)	−5.5 (22.1)	−0.7 (30.7)	4.1 (39.4)	9.2 (48.6)	13.7 (56.7)	13.2 (55.8)	9.2 (48.6)	3.8 (38.8)	0.0 (32.0)	−3.2 (26.2)	2.4 (36.4)
Mean minimum °C (°F)	−16.6 (2.1)	−17.6 (0.3)	−13.7 (7.3)	−6.0 (21.2)	−0.1 (31.8)	4.6 (40.3)	9.8 (49.6)	8.8 (47.8)	4.0 (39.2)	−2.1 (28.2)	−6.3 (20.7)	−10.1 (13.8)	−20.2 (−4.4)
Record low °C (°F)	−28.3 (−18.9)	−34.0 (−29.2)	−31.0 (−23.8)	−21.0 (−5.8)	−7.8 (18.0)	0.8 (33.4)	6.3 (43.3)	4.5 (40.1)	−2.0 (28.4)	−9.1 (15.6)	−15.8 (3.6)	−25.6 (−14.1)	−34.0 (−29.2)
Average precipitation mm (inches)	48.0 (1.89)	38.6 (1.52)	32.9 (1.30)	27.0 (1.06)	37.7 (1.48)	38.7 (1.52)	43.8 (1.72)	55.0 (2.17)	50.3 (1.98)	59.4 (2.34)	60.4 (2.38)	59.6 (2.35)	551.4 (21.71)
Mean monthly sunshine hours	30.8	73.8	166.9	212.2	271.3	285.2	287.9	223.9	157.1	103.4	47.9	26.0	1,886.4
Source 1: SMHI
Source 2: SMHI Monthly Data 2002–2018

== History ==
The islands played host to fishing and sealing parties from the moment the first islands broke the sea's surface around the start of the Christian era.

- Around 1300 the seasonal hunters and fishers supposedly first settled permanently on the islands. This supposition is backed by a number of toponyms found in the islands.
- In 1543 King Gustav Vasa starts taxing the farming inhabitants of Holmöarna. Seven farms were found in the islands at that point.
- In 1698 the Umeå postmaster was ordered to have mail destined for Finland taken across Kvarken by Holmöarna's inhabitants whenever weather conditions allowed.
- In 1717 Holmön was plundered by the Russians.
- In 1760 the first lighthouse of the Kvarken narrows was constructed on Holmögadd.
- In 1802 the first church on Holmön, named Helena Elisabeth was built.
- In 1838 the current lighthouse on Holmögadd was built.
- In 1860 the Swedish Riksdag parliament voted to release the farming population from the duty to bring mail across Kvarken.
- In 1891 Helena Elisabeth Church becomes too crowded and a new church designed by Fritz Eckert is built on Strandsberget hill.
- In 1925 Holmön is designated a separate municipality.
- In the 1930s regular ferry traffic was taken up between Holmön and Ostnäs in mainland Sweden.
- In 1956 the ferry's mainland port of call is moved to Norrfjärden.
- In 1957 Helena Elisabeth's church is moved to Gammlia open-air museum near Umeå.
- From 1974 the islands are part of Umeå Municipality and stop being Sweden's smallest municipality.
- In 1980 Holmöarna are designated a nature reserve. The reserve is Sweden's largest marine nature reserve.
- In 1983 the current ferry, named Helena Elisabeth, is put into service.
- In 1984 a birding centre is housed in the former lighthouse keeper's residence on Stora Fjäderägg.
- In 1994 the first Holmön Folk Festival (Visfestival Holmön) was held.
- In 1998 Holmön's Ship Museum is inaugurated.
- In 2001 a youth hostel was opened in the former lighthouse keeper's residence on Stora Fjäderägg.

== Culture ==
- Postrodden is a yearly festival in memory of the duty imposed for centuries on the inhabitants of the Holmöarna and Björkö islands to bring mail and travellers across Kvarken.
- Visfestival Holmön is a Folk Festival held in held every year in July since 1994.

== Communications ==
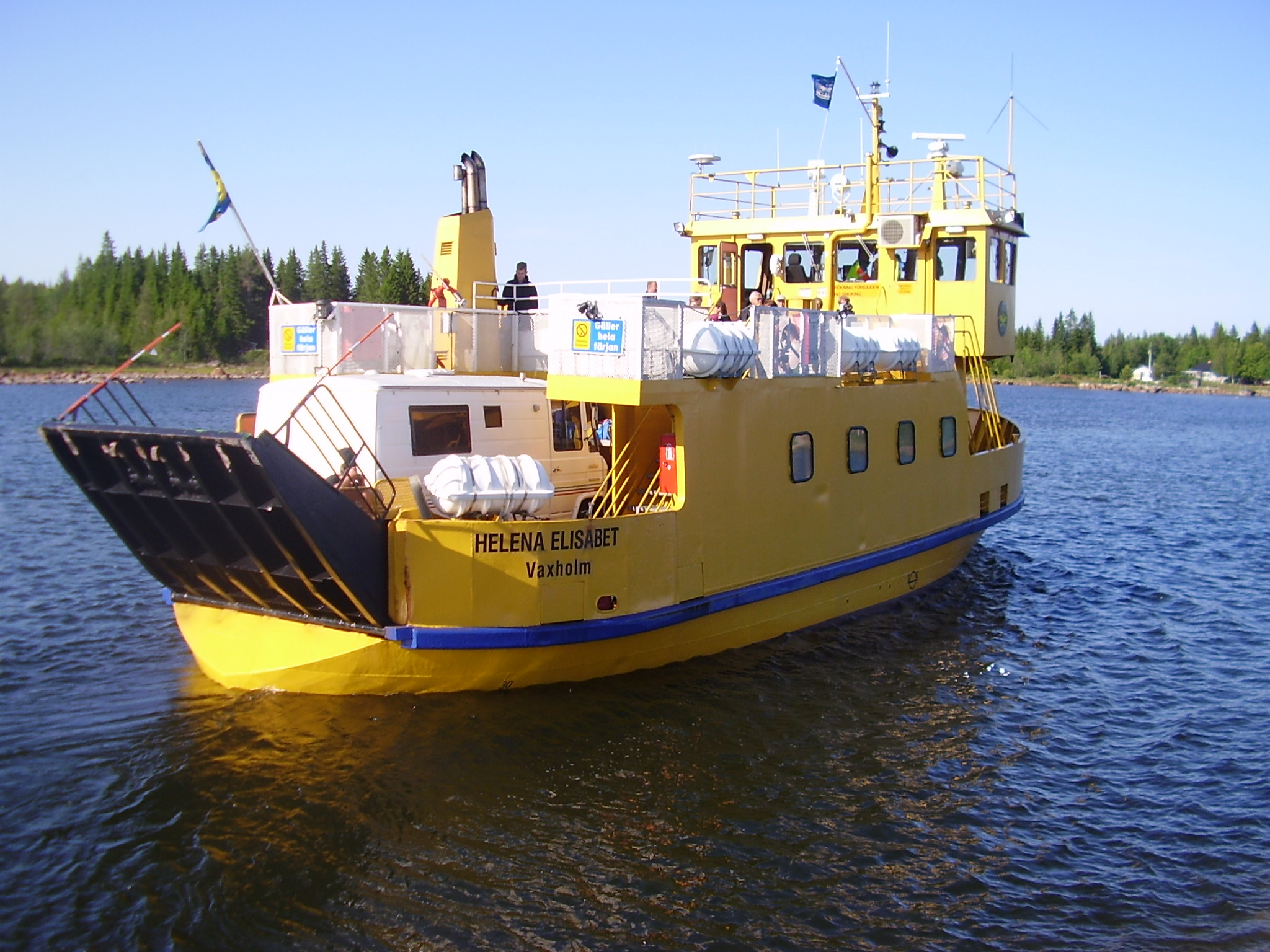
Ferry Helena Elisabeth

Communications between Byviken and Norrfjärden on the mainland are carried out free of charge by a car ferry in the ice-free months or as long as the boat is able to break its own course through the ice. Once the ice has grown too thick to break, a hydrocopter is put to use, but being susceptible to pervading winds, it is often replaced with a helicopter service. The ferry ride to the islands takes approximately 45 minutes.

From time to time Holmöslupen, a reconstructed sloop as was once common along the coast of Västerbotten, sails between Byviken and Stora Fjäderägg accepting passengers.
