= Vännäs =

Vännäsby
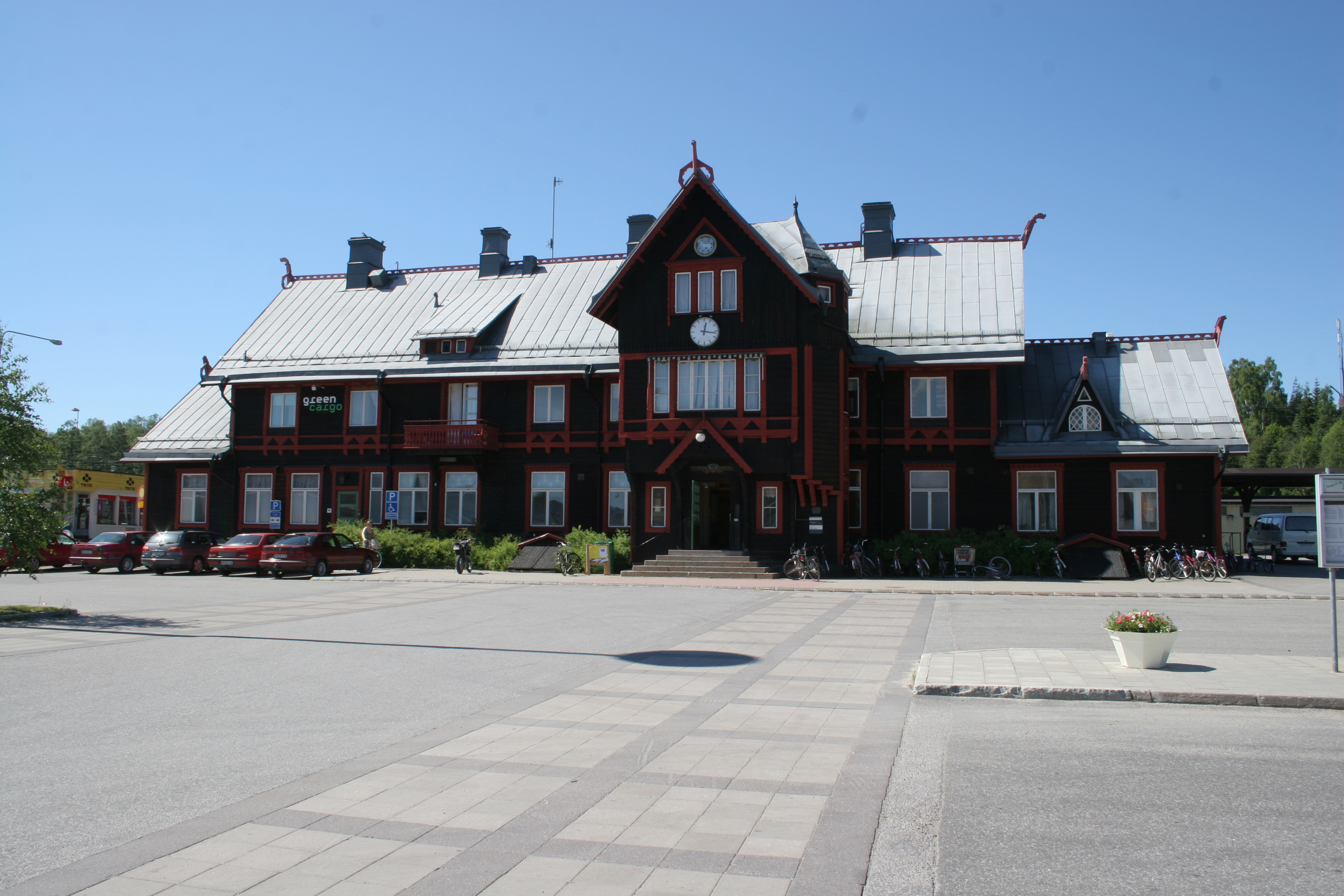
- Vännäs railway station in July 2005

- Location within Västerbotten Location within Sweden
- Coordinates: 63°55′N 19°45′E
- Country: Sweden
- Province: Västerbotten
- County: Västerbotten County
- Municipality: Vännäs Municipality

Area
  - Total: 3.28 km^{2} (1.27 sq mi)

Population (31 December 2018)
  - Total: 4,466
  - Density: 1,257/km^{2} (3,260/sq mi)
- Time zone: UTC+1 (CET)
  - Summer (DST): UTC+2 (CEST)

Vännäs (Swedish pronunciation: [ˈvɛ̌nːɛs]) is a locality in Västerbotten County in northern Sweden. Vännäs is the seat of Vännäs Municipality and had 9,077 inhabitants in 2024.

The name of the village has existed since 1535 (Wendenäs, "The place where a person walking down the western shoreline of the Vindel river must change her path").

Vännäs is the hometown of the hardcore band Refused. The Vännäs TV Tower, a 323-metre partially staffed broadcasting mast, is located in the vicinity of Vännäs.

== Twinned municipalities ==
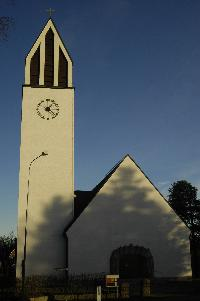
Johannes Church

Vännäs Municipality is twinned with Cameri, Italy (since 2003), Hemnes, Norway and Storkyro, Finland.

== Vännäsdagarna ==
Vännäsdagarna ("The Vännäs Days") is a three-day annual festival during the second weekend of July, which brings a mix of performers and street vendors to Vännäs every year. An estimated 58,000 visitors attend the festival each year, thus making Vännäsdagarna the biggest festival in Västerbotten County.

== Railway ==
The Main Line Through Upper Norrland was built during the 19th century and was for military reasons passing through Vännäs instead of Umeå, the largest urban center in Västerbotten. The railway made Vännäs an important rail junction, which facilitated the rapid growth of the locality. Today, passenger trains depart regularly to Umeå and to Vindeln and Luleå further north.

== Amenities ==
There are two supermarkets, ICA and Coop a Systembolaget as well as several cafes, pizzerias, two Thai restaurants and at least three hairdressers. Vännäs also has a district veterinarian with 24-hour coverage.

== Education ==
Liljaskolan, the locality's only upper secondary school caters for 1,100 students, studying at eleven programmes. Students at Liljaskolan can choose to study, among other things, transportation and tourism.

Hammarskolan caters for some 250 pupils in year 7–9, whereas younger students attend Vegaskolan which caters for years 0–9.

== Attractions ==
Vännäs is home to a motor museum where there are vintage cars, motorbikes, tractors, airplanes, and helicopters. It is housed in an old aircraft hangar to the west of the town.

Vännäs Badcamping has an outdoor waterpark that is open through the summer and has a water slide, as well as a cafe and a sauna.

== Notable people from Vännäs ==
Artists

- Frank Björklund

Athletes

- Daniel Tjärnqvist
- Mathias Tjärnqvist

Media

- Sverker Olofsson
- Linda Olofsson

Musicians

- Dennis Lyxzén
