= Granö =

- Location within Västerbotten Location within Sweden
- Coordinates: 64°15′N 19°18′E
- Country: Sweden
- Province: Västerbotten
- County: Västerbotten County
- Municipality: Vindeln Municipality

Area
  - Total: 0.98 km^{2} (0.38 sq mi)

Population (31 December 2010)
  - Total: 238
  - Density: 243/km^{2} (630/sq mi)
- Time zone: UTC+1 (CET)
  - Summer (DST): UTC+2 (CEST)

Granö is a locality situated in Vindeln Municipality, Västerbotten County, Sweden with 238 inhabitants in 2010.
