= Mitt i naturen =

- Genre: Nature
- Country of origin: Sweden
- Original language: Swedish

Original release
- Network: SVT
- Release: 1980

Mitt i naturen (lit. In the Midst of Nature) is a Swedish nature show which has been broadcast on SVT since 1980. The show uses the song Chariots of Fire by Vangelis as its signature melody. Past hosts of the show have included Martin Emtenäs, Charlotte Permell and Linda Olofsson.
