= Vindel River =

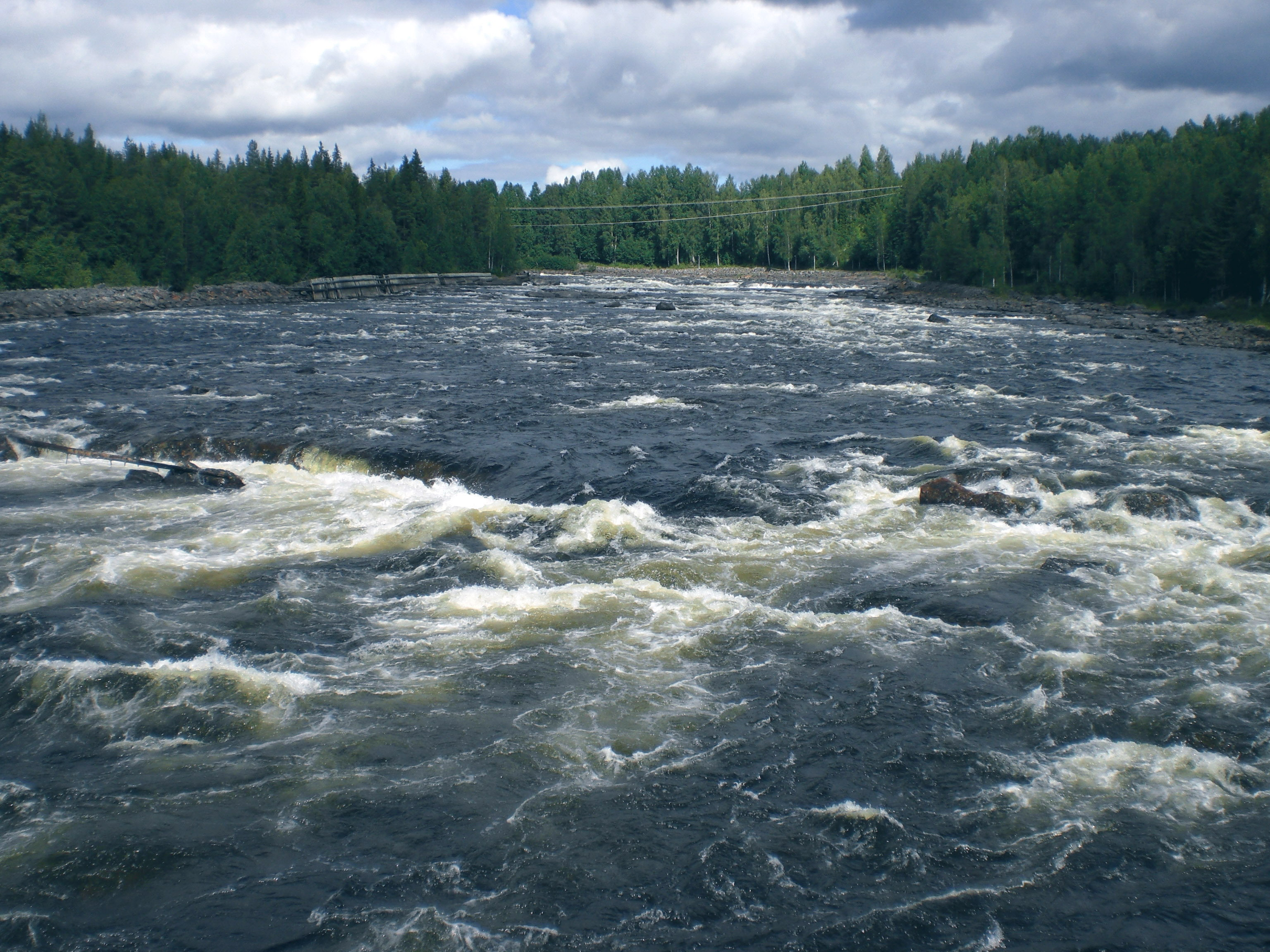
- Renforsen rapid in the Vindel River

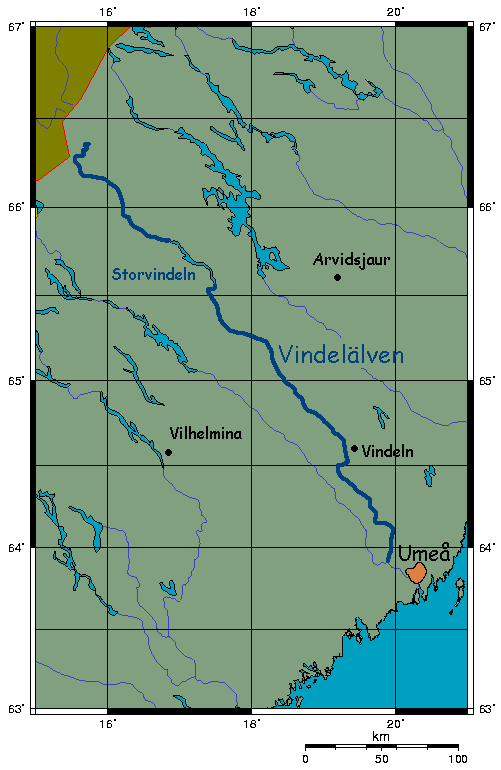
- Native name: Vindelälven (Swedish)

Location
- Country: Sweden

Physical characteristics
- Mouth: Ume River
  - coordinates: 63°55′00″N 19°51′30″E
- Length: 445 km (277 mi)
- Basin size: 12,650 km^{2} (4,880 sq mi)
- Discharge
  - average: 190 m^{3}/s (6,700 cu ft/s)

Basin features
- Designation

Ramsar Wetland
- Official name: Vindelälven
- Designated: 19 March 2013
- Reference no.: 2181

The Vindel River (Swedish: Vindelälven) is a river in northern Sweden. It is a tributary to Ume River and the biggest tributary river in Sweden. It lends its name to the Vindelfjällen Nature Reserve, one of the largest protected areas in Europe, totaling 562,772 ha (approx. 5,628 km2). Since it is partially located within the reserve, it is permanently protected from hydroelectric development. Downstream from Vännäsby, where the Vindel merges with the Ume River, Sweden's largest hydropower plant is located.

The source of the river is in the mountains close to the border with Norway. The Vindel flows generally to the southeast. Sorsele and Vindeln are the two biggest localities on the banks of the Vindel.
