= Vindeln =

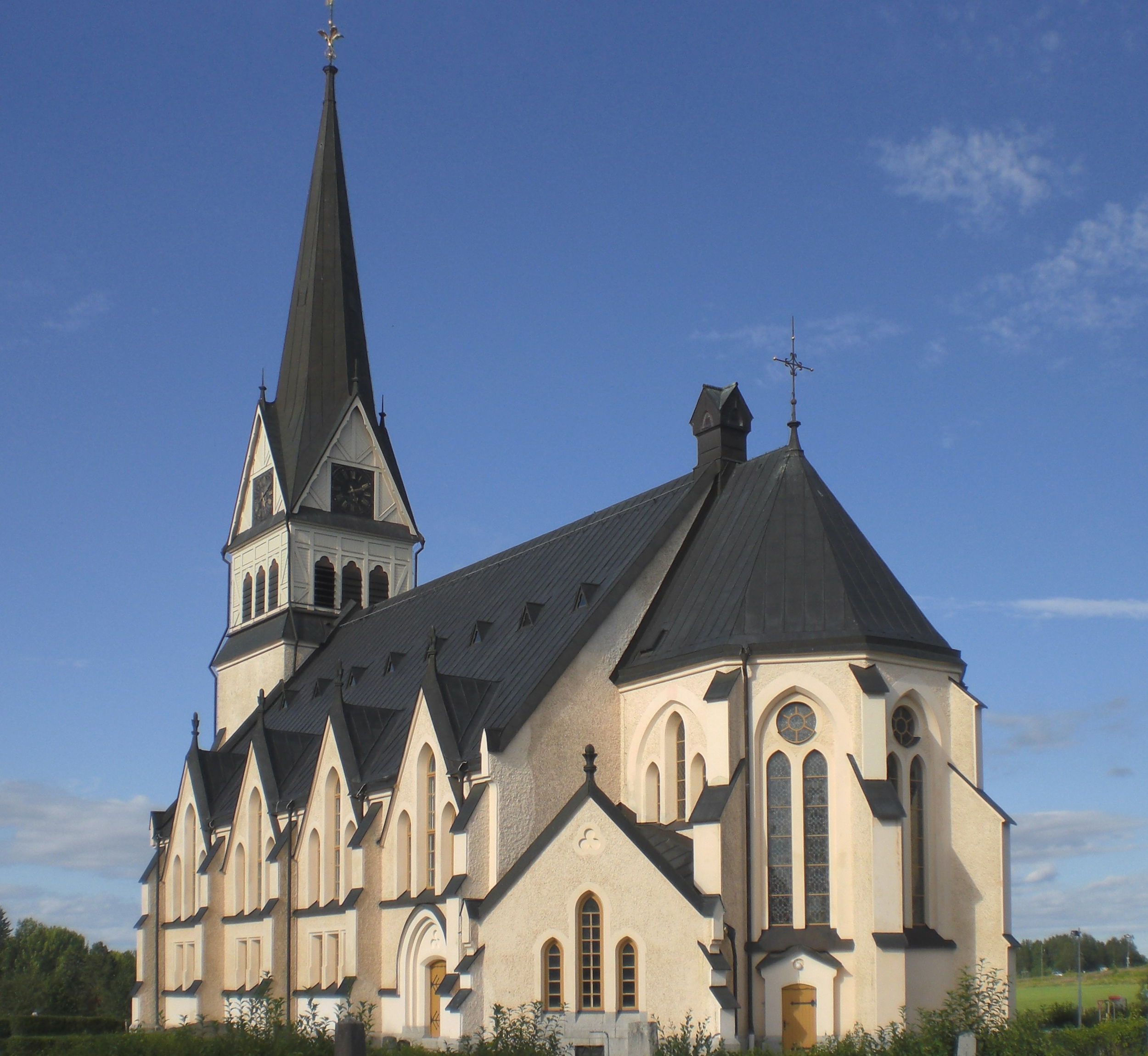
- Vindeln Church

- Location within Västerbotten Location within Sweden
- Coordinates: 64°12′N 19°43′E
- Country: Sweden
- Province: Västerbotten
- County: Västerbotten County
- Municipality: Vindeln Municipality

Area
  - Total: 2.96 km^{2} (1.14 sq mi)

Population (31 December 2010)
  - Total: 2,333
  - Density: 788/km^{2} (2,040/sq mi)
- Time zone: UTC+1 (CET)
  - Summer (DST): UTC+2 (CEST)

Vindeln (Swedish pronunciation: [ˈvɪ̂nːdɛln]) is a locality and the seat of Vindeln Municipality in Västerbotten County, Sweden with 2,333 inhabitants in 2010.

== Climate ==
Vindeln has a subarctic climate that is mildened for its latitude by its proximity to the Gulf Stream airflow. Considering it being inland, winters are more severe than coastal areas such as Umeå and Holmön, but milder than areas at a higher elevation. Summers are short but often warm, with civil twilight lasting all night during a few weeks, contrasted by the vast winter darkness with very short days. Precipitation is moderate but due to the cold winter temperatures there is a sizeable snow cover every year.

Climate data for Vindeln-Sunnansjönäs (2002–2022 averages); extremes since 1946
Month	Jan	Feb	Mar	Apr	May	Jun	Jul	Aug	Sep	Oct	Nov	Dec	Year
Record high °C (°F)	9.6 (49.3)	9.5 (49.1)	14.9 (58.8)	20.6 (69.1)	28.3 (82.9)	32.1 (89.8)	33.3 (91.9)	29.7 (85.5)	25.0 (77.0)	17.8 (64.0)	12.6 (54.7)	9.4 (48.9)	33.3 (91.9)
Mean maximum °C (°F)	2.7 (36.9)	4.7 (40.5)	9.2 (48.6)	15.4 (59.7)	23.0 (73.4)	26.1 (79.0)	27.4 (81.3)	25.0 (77.0)	19.2 (66.6)	13.2 (55.8)	6.8 (44.2)	3.6 (38.5)	28.6 (83.5)
Mean daily maximum °C (°F)	−4.9 (23.2)	−3.5 (25.7)	1.5 (34.7)	7.1 (44.8)	13.5 (56.3)	18.2 (64.8)	20.8 (69.4)	18.7 (65.7)	13.2 (55.8)	6.0 (42.8)	0.2 (32.4)	−2.6 (27.3)	7.4 (45.2)
Daily mean °C (°F)	−7.8 (18.0)	−6.8 (19.8)	−2.6 (27.3)	2.5 (36.5)	8.2 (46.8)	12.9 (55.2)	15.8 (60.4)	13.6 (56.5)	9.2 (48.6)	3.0 (37.4)	−2.1 (28.2)	−5.3 (22.5)	3.4 (38.1)
Mean daily minimum °C (°F)	−10.7 (12.7)	−10.0 (14.0)	−6.6 (20.1)	−2.1 (28.2)	2.8 (37.0)	7.6 (45.7)	10.8 (51.4)	9.5 (49.1)	5.2 (41.4)	0.0 (32.0)	−4.4 (24.1)	−7.9 (17.8)	−0.5 (31.1)
Mean minimum °C (°F)	−22.6 (−8.7)	−21.0 (−5.8)	−16.4 (2.5)	−8.4 (16.9)	−3.1 (26.4)	1.9 (35.4)	5.7 (42.3)	3.3 (37.9)	−1.3 (29.7)	−8.7 (16.3)	−13.4 (7.9)	−18.1 (−0.6)	−24.9 (−12.8)
Record low °C (°F)	−41.0 (−41.8)	−45.3 (−49.5)	−36.0 (−32.8)	−27.2 (−17.0)	−12.0 (10.4)	−4.6 (23.7)	−0.7 (30.7)	−3.4 (25.9)	−9.7 (14.5)	−24.8 (−12.6)	−32.2 (−26.0)	−40.1 (−40.2)	−45.3 (−49.5)
Average precipitation mm (inches)	45.2 (1.78)	38.2 (1.50)	29.5 (1.16)	26.7 (1.05)	39.7 (1.56)	60.4 (2.38)	87.7 (3.45)	77.8 (3.06)	61.7 (2.43)	60.3 (2.37)	49.0 (1.93)	55.9 (2.20)	632.1 (24.87)
Average extreme snow depth cm (inches)	61 (24)	80 (31)	83 (33)	68 (27)	8 (3.1)	0 (0)	0 (0)	0 (0)	0 (0)	5 (2.0)	13 (5.1)	37 (15)	86 (34)
Source 1: SMHI Open Data
Source 2: SMHI Monthly Data 2002–2022
