= Västerbotten County (Riksdag constituency) =

Swedish national legislative constituency

- Västerbottens Län
- Constituency for the Riksdag
- Location of Västerbotten County within Sweden
- County: Västerbotten
- Population: 279,024 (2025)
- Electorate: 213,705 (2026)
- Area: 59,255 km^{2} (2026)

Current constituency
- Created: 1970
- Seats: List (Note: Constituency seats only.): 8 (2022–present); 9 (1970–2022)
- Member of the Riksdag: List: Julia Algotsson (C); Isak From (S); Sara Gille (SD); Veronica Kerr (KD); Malin Malm (S); Edward Riedl (M); Nils Seye Larsen (MP); Caroline Täljeblad (V); Björn Wiechel (S)
- Created from: Västerbotten County

Västerbotten County (Swedish: Västerbottens Län) is one of the 29 multi-member constituencies of the Riksdag, the national legislature of Sweden. The constituency was established in 1970 when the Riksdag changed from a bicameral legislature to a unicameral legislature. It is conterminous with the county of Västerbotten. The constituency currently elects eight of the 349 members of the Riksdag using the open party-list proportional representation electoral system. At the 2026 general election it had 213,705 registered electors.

== Electoral system ==
Västerbotten County currently elects eight of the 349 members of the Riksdag using the open party-list proportional representation electoral system. Constituency seats are allocated using the modified Sainte-Laguë method. Only parties that reach the 4% national threshold and parties that receive at least 12% of the vote in the constituency compete for constituency seats. Supplementary levelling seats may also be allocated at the constituency level to parties that reach the 4% national threshold.

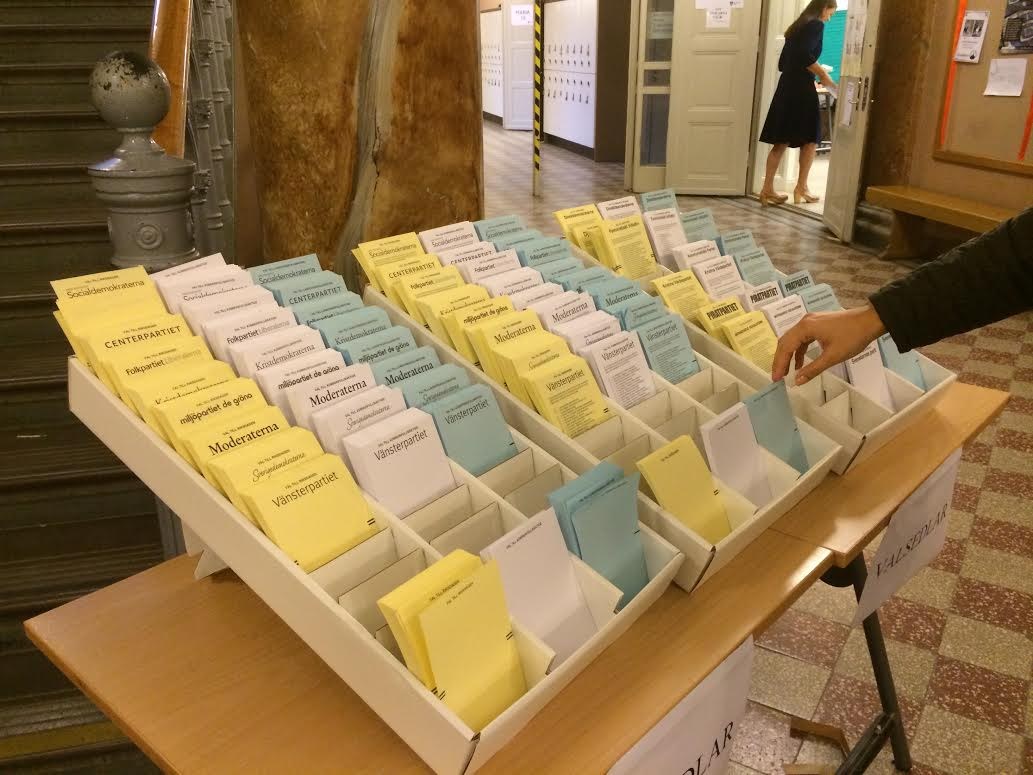
A selection of ballot papers available for voters at the 2014 general election in Stockholm - yellow for the Riksdag, blue for the regional council and white for the municipal council

Prior to 1997 voters could cast any ballot paper they wanted, though it had to contain the name of a party and the name of at least one candidate nominated by that party in the constituency. It was common for parties to hand out ballot papers with their name and list of candidates at the entrance of polling stations. Voters could delete the names of candidates or write-in the names of other candidates but in practice these options weren't used enough by voters to have any significant impact on the results and consequently elections operated as a closed system.

Since 1997, elections in Sweden follow the French model in having separate ballot papers for each party/list in a constituency. There are two ballot papers for each party - a party ballot paper (partivalsedel) with just the name of the party and a name ballot paper (namnvalsedel) with the name of the party and its list of candidates. There are also blank ballot papers (blank valsedel). Voters can initially pick as many ballot papers as they wish and then, in the secrecy of the voting booth, they select a single ballot paper of their choice. If they chose a name ballot paper they have the option of casting a preferential vote for one of their chosen party's candidates. If they chose a blank ballot paper they can write the name of any party including unregistered parties and, optionally, they can write the name of any person as their preferred candidate, even one that does not belong to their chosen party. They then place their chosen ballot paper in an envelope which is placed in the ballot box, discarding all other ballot papers they picked.

Seats won by each party/list in a constituency are allocated to its candidates in order of preference votes (a personal mandate), provided that the candidate has received at least 8% of votes cast for their party in the constituency (5% since January 2011). Any unfilled seats are then allocated to the party's remaining candidates in the order they appear on the party list (a party mandate).

== Election results ==
=== Summary ===
Election	Left V / VPK			Social Democrats S			Greens MP			Centre C			Liberals L / FP / F			Moderates M			Christian Democrats KD / KDS			Sweden Democrats SD		
Election	Votes	%	Seats	Votes	%	Seats	Votes	%	Seats	Votes	%	Seats	Votes	%	Seats	Votes	%	Seats	Votes	%	Seats	Votes	%	Seats
2026	16,915	9.34%	1	66,875	36.94%	3	13,552	7.49%	1	13,025	7.19%	1	6,337	3.50%	0	27,859	15.39%	1	10,697	5.91%	0	23,081	12.75%	1
2022	15,097	8.50%	1	72,318	40.73%	4	9,653	5.44%	0	13,827	7.79%	1	5,544	3.12%	0	25,121	14.15%	1	8,368	4.71%	0	25,666	14.46%	1
2018	22,696	12.69%	1	68,197	38.13%	4	6,925	3.87%	0	18,078	10.11%	1	7,038	3.94%	0	24,139	13.50%	2	9,376	5.24%	0	19,571	10.94%	1
2014	19,214	10.96%	1	73,661	42.03%	5	10,341	5.90%	0	11,660	6.65%	1	7,606	4.34%	0	24,158	13.78%	1	7,477	4.27%	0	12,979	7.40%	1
2010	17,034	9.98%	1	72,008	42.21%	4	12,246	7.18%	1	12,699	7.44%	1	10,296	6.04%	0	30,184	17.69%	2	9,125	5.35%	0	4,651	2.73%	0
2006	13,599	8.37%	1	71,260	43.86%	5	9,544	5.87%	0	19,154	11.79%	1	10,310	6.35%	0	22,213	13.67%	1	10,497	6.46%	1	1,832	1.13%	0
2002	17,822	11.47%	1	72,176	46.45%	5	6,938	4.47%	0	17,448	11.23%	1	15,673	10.09%	1	10,083	6.49%	0	13,135	8.45%	1	540	0.35%	0
1998	24,800	15.71%	2	68,225	43.22%	5	7,730	4.90%	0	10,487	6.64%	0	8,530	5.40%	0	18,518	11.73%	1	16,925	10.72%	1			
1994	12,133	7.29%	1	86,568	52.04%	5	9,716	5.84%	0	15,689	9.43%	1	13,445	8.08%	1	18,444	11.09%	1	8,389	5.04%	0			
1991	8,774	5.43%	0	73,103	45.28%	5	5,250	3.25%	0	20,333	12.59%	1	15,974	9.89%	1	17,514	10.85%	1	13,882	8.60%	1			
1988	9,381	5.89%	0	77,054	48.37%	5	7,331	4.60%	0	22,818	14.32%	2	19,127	12.01%	1	14,160	8.89%	1	8,318	5.22%	0			
1985	9,335	5.67%	0	79,958	48.53%	5	2,045	1.24%	0	29,745	18.05%	2	23,955	14.54%	1	18,671	11.33%	1	with C					
1982	9,153	5.54%	0	81,480	49.28%	5	2,045	1.24%	0	31,805	19.23%	2	12,842	7.77%	1	21,050	12.73%	1	6,402	3.87%	0			
1979	8,759	5.41%	0	75,233	46.46%	5				34,075	21.04%	2	20,204	12.48%	1	17,279	10.67%	1	5,357	3.31%	0			
1976	6,480	4.06%	0	72,186	45.28%	4				42,009	26.35%	3	18,679	11.72%	1	13,972	8.76%	1	5,241	3.29%	0			
1973	5,792	3.86%	0	67,516	45.00%	4				39,246	26.16%	3	17,653	11.77%	1	12,815	8.54%	1	5,952	3.97%	0			
1970	4,208	2.89%	0	67,177	46.09%	4				31,509	21.62%	2	25,325	17.38%	2	11,412	7.83%	1	5,434	3.73%	0			

(Excludes levelling seats. Figures in italics represent alliances/joint lists.)

=== Detailed ===
Party has received at least 4% of the vote nationally and is entitled to compete for constituency seats.

==== 2020s ====
===== 2026 =====
Results of the 2026 general election held on 13 September 2026:

Party		Votes per municipality															Total votes	%	Seats		
Party		Åsele	Bjur- holm	Doro- tea	Lyck- sele	Malå	Nord- maling	Norsjö	Roberts- fors	Skellef- teå	Sorsele	Storu- man	Umeå	Vännäs	Vilhel- mina	Vindeln	Total votes	%	Con.	Lev.	Tot.
Swedish Social Democratic Party	S	544	428	534	2,721	644	1,489	909	1,528	20,386	438	1,062	31,988	1,873	1,288	1,043	66,875	36.94%	3	0	3
Moderate Party	M	222	275	141	1,167	210	736	357	649	7,053	212	537	14,290	922	461	627	27,859	15.39%	1	0	1
Sweden Democrats	SD	369	326	337	1,255	375	801	370	604	6,892	333	735	8,224	922	920	618	23,081	12.75%	1	0	1
Left Party	V	88	45	82	494	132	262	136	297	3,649	73	204	10,486	497	274	196	16,915	9.34%	1	0	1
Green Party	MP	38	39	35	245	58	176	52	255	2,455	110	213	9,199	313	216	148	13,552	7.49%	1	0	1
Centre Party	C	138	128	108	357	63	449	136	477	3,154	113	228	6,629	474	263	308	13,025	7.19%	1	0	1
Christian Democrats	KD	145	137	113	904	105	354	236	286	2,941	121	314	3,950	392	426	273	10,697	5.91%	0	1	1
Liberals	L	76	51	57	280	82	167	81	127	1,425	35	112	3,421	210	98	115	6,337	3.50%	0	0	0
Örebro Party	ÖP	22	11	11	55	13	30	30	32	212	13	25	418	48	41	18	979	0.54%	0	0	0
Alternative for Sweden	AfS	9	7	2	12	3	18	11	24	155	7	17	343	24	15	8	655	0.36%	0	0	0
Christian Values Party	KrVP	5	7	0	17	0	10	3	11	89	3	4	99	32	4	18	302	0.17%	0	0	0
Ambition Sweden	AS	5	1	2	12	0	3	5	14	44	10	15	81	6	20	9	227	0.13%	0	0	0
Pirate Party	PP	1	1	2	6	0	4	1	2	43	1	3	151	4	1	4	224	0.12%	0	0	0
Citizens' Coalition	MED	1	0	0	1	1	3	1	1	43	2	2	38	7	0	2	102	0.06%	0	0	0
Human Rights and Democracy	MoD	0	0	0	0	0	3	0	2	24	0	0	30	0	0	2	61	0.03%	0	0	0
United Voice	ER	0	1	0	0	0	0	0	0	2	0	0	38	0	0	0	41	0.02%	0	0	0
Direct Democrats	DD	0	0	0	0	0	0	0	0	14	0	0	11	0	0	0	25	0.01%	0	0	0
Independent Rural Party	LPo	0	0	1	4	1	2	1	4	3	0	0	2	1	1	0	20	0.01%	0	0	0
Communist Party of Sweden	SKP	1	2	4	1	0	0	1	0	6	1	0	3	0	0	0	19	0.01%	0	0	0
Turning Point Party	PV	0	0	0	0	0	0	0	0	2	0	5	6	0	0	0	13	0.01%	0	0	0
Volt Sweden	Volt	0	0	0	0	0	0	0	0	2	0	0	5	2	0	0	9	0.00%	0	0	0
Nordic Resistance Movement	NMR	0	0	0	0	0	1	0	1	2	0	0	3	0	1	0	8	0.00%	0	0	0
Communist Party	K	0	0	0	1	0	0	0	0	0	0	0	3	0	0	1	5	0.00%	0	0	0
Unity	ENH	0	0	0	0	0	1	0	0	0	0	0	4	0	0	0	5	0.00%	0	0	0
Donald Duck Party		0	0	0	0	0	0	0	0	1	0	0	3	0	0	0	4	0.00%	0	0	0
The Push Buttons	Kn	0	0	0	0	0	0	1	0	1	0	0	1	1	0	0	4	0.00%	0	0	0
Classical Liberal Party	KLP	0	0	0	0	0	1	0	0	1	0	0	0	0	0	0	2	0.00%	0	0	0
Nuance Party	PNy	0	0	0	0	0	0	0	0	0	0	0	1	0	1	0	2	0.00%	0	0	0
Free Wermland		0	0	0	0	0	0	0	0	0	0	0	1	0	0	0	1	0.00%	0	0	0
Multidimensional Party		0	0	0	0	0	0	0	0	0	0	0	1	0	0	0	1	0.00%	0	0	0
Pax		0	0	0	0	0	0	0	0	0	0	0	1	0	0	0	1	0.00%	0	0	0
Peace Team		0	0	0	0	0	0	0	0	0	0	0	0	1	0	0	1	0.00%	0	0	0
RegleraAI.nu		0	0	0	0	0	0	0	0	1	0	0	0	0	0	0	1	0.00%	0	0	0
Secular Humanist Party		0	0	0	0	0	0	0	0	1	0	0	0	0	0	0	1	0.00%	0	0	0
United Sweden		0	0	0	0	0	0	0	0	0	0	0	1	0	0	0	1	0.00%	0	0	0
Valid votes		1,664	1,459	1,429	7,532	1,687	4,510	2,331	4,314	48,601	1,472	3,476	89,431	5,729	4,030	3,390	181,055	100.00%	8	1	9
Blank votes		18	13	24	96	33	42	36	38	538	21	52	560	47	70	39	1,627	0.89%			
Rejected votes – unregistered parties		0	0	0	1	0	0	0	1	9	0	0	8	2	0	0	21	0.01%			
Rejected votes – other		0	0	0	18	1	4	0	3	13	0	0	34	1	1	3	78	0.04%			
Total polled		1,682	1,472	1,453	7,647	1,721	4,556	2,367	4,356	49,161	1,493	3,528	90,033	5,779	4,101	3,432	182,781	85.53%			
Registered electors		2,024	1,798	1,796	9,284	2,135	5,518	2,888	5,169	57,288	1,787	4,421	103,674	6,881	4,943	4,099	213,705				
Turnout		83.10%	81.87%	80.90%	82.37%	80.61%	82.57%	81.96%	84.27%	85.81%	83.55%	79.80%	86.84%	83.98%	82.97%	83.73%	85.53%				

The following candidates were elected:

- Constituency seats (personal mandates) - Julia Algotsson (C), 1,014 votes; Edward Riedl (M), 2,371 votes; Nils Seye Larsen (MP), 697 votes; and Caroline Täljeblad (V), 904 votes.
- Constituency seats (party mandates) - Isak From (S), 1,714 votes; Sara Gille (SD), 146 votes; Malin Malm (S), 1,294 votes; and Björn Wiechel (S), 794 votes.
- Levelling seats (party mandates) - Veronica Kerr (KD), 103 votes.

===== 2022 =====
Results of the 2022 general election held on 11 September 2022:

Party		Votes per municipality															Total votes	%	Seats		
Party		Åsele	Bjur- holm	Doro- tea	Lyck- sele	Malå	Nord- maling	Norsjö	Roberts- fors	Skellef- teå	Sorsele	Storu- man	Umeå	Vännäs	Vilhel- mina	Vindeln	Total votes	%	Con.	Lev.	Tot.
Swedish Social Democratic Party	S	651	447	641	3,054	724	1,724	1,034	1,703	21,649	571	1,248	34,233	2,049	1,438	1,152	72,318	40.73%	4	0	4
Sweden Democrats	SD	386	364	351	1,374	441	994	461	661	7,338	317	836	9,328	1,029	1,051	735	25,666	14.46%	1	0	1
Moderate Party	M	222	301	104	1,111	171	628	335	567	6,386	166	474	12,824	838	430	564	25,121	14.15%	1	0	1
Left Party	V	93	42	131	404	163	263	160	272	3,184	107	259	9,074	447	319	179	15,097	8.50%	1	0	1
Centre Party	C	173	121	116	396	79	426	153	556	3,536	113	232	6,826	509	265	326	13,827	7.79%	1	0	1
Green Party	MP	30	29	26	163	26	118	30	184	1,903	33	115	6,566	250	83	97	9,653	5.44%	0	1	1
Christian Democrats	KD	92	137	78	776	105	282	214	219	2,123	103	288	3,102	273	364	212	8,368	4.71%	0	0	0
Liberals	L	55	45	58	216	86	122	91	90	1,266	32	142	3,073	123	59	86	5,544	3.12%	0	0	0
Alternative for Sweden	AfS	6	6	2	9	5	11	4	12	84	2	9	222	15	16	12	415	0.23%	0	0	0
Citizens' Coalition	MED	1	2	0	17	1	1	5	5	129	3	3	172	9	3	3	354	0.20%	0	0	0
Pirate Party	PP	5	2	1	1	2	9	0	5	40	0	3	135	5	11	7	226	0.13%	0	0	0
Christian Values Party	KrVP	7	2	0	10	1	14	4	8	60	3	3	72	21	10	5	220	0.12%	0	0	0
Human Rights and Democracy	MoD	2	0	0	7	0	0	3	5	47	0	0	95	4	5	1	169	0.10%	0	0	0
Nuance Party	PNy	0	0	1	0	0	0	0	0	9	0	0	101	0	0	2	113	0.06%	0	0	0
The Push Buttons	Kn	0	2	0	0	1	1	1	5	49	1	6	25	12	7	0	110	0.06%	0	0	0
Feminist Initiative	FI	0	0	0	2	0	1	1	1	22	2	0	51	2	3	0	85	0.05%	0	0	0
Independent Rural Party	LPo	1	0	10	10	1	2	5	4	10	3	3	4	6	6	3	68	0.04%	0	0	0
Direct Democrats	DD	0	0	0	0	0	3	1	0	21	0	1	26	1	1	0	54	0.03%	0	0	0
Unity	ENH	0	0	0	3	0	2	0	0	7	0	0	8	0	0	2	22	0.01%	0	0	0
Nordic Resistance Movement	NMR	0	0	0	0	0	0	0	2	5	0	1	9	0	2	1	20	0.01%	0	0	0
Climate Alliance	KA	0	0	1	1	0	1	0	1	2	0	0	11	0	2	0	19	0.01%	0	0	0
Turning Point Party	PV	0	0	0	0	0	0	0	0	1	0	0	16	0	0	0	17	0.01%	0	0	0
Communist Party of Sweden	SKP	1	0	1	0	0	0	2	0	1	0	0	3	0	3	1	12	0.01%	0	0	0
Classical Liberal Party	KLP	0	0	0	0	1	1	0	0	3	0	0	3	0	1	0	9	0.01%	0	0	0
Basic Income Party	BASIP	0	0	0	0	0	0	0	0	2	0	0	6	0	0	0	8	0.00%	0	0	0
Socialist Welfare Party	S-V	0	0	0	0	0	0	0	2	2	0	0	2	0	0	0	6	0.00%	0	0	0
National Law of Sweden		0	0	0	0	0	0	0	0	1	0	0	4	0	0	0	5	0.00%	0	0	0
Sweden Out of the EU/ Free Justice Party	FRP	0	0	2	0	0	2	0	0	0	0	0	0	0	0	0	4	0.00%	0	0	0
Donald Duck Party		0	0	0	0	0	0	0	0	2	0	1	0	0	0	0	3	0.00%	0	0	0
Hard Line Sweden		0	0	0	0	0	0	0	0	0	0	0	1	0	1	0	2	0.00%	0	0	0
United Democratic Party		0	0	0	0	0	0	0	0	2	0	0	0	0	0	0	2	0.00%	0	0	0
Volt Sweden	Volt	0	0	0	0	0	0	0	0	0	0	0	0	1	0	1	2	0.00%	0	0	0
Electoral Cooperation Party		0	0	0	0	0	0	0	0	0	1	0	0	0	0	0	1	0.00%	0	0	0
Evil Chicken Party	OKP	0	0	0	0	0	0	0	0	0	0	0	1	0	0	0	1	0.00%	0	0	0
Social Libertarians		0	0	0	0	0	0	0	0	0	0	0	1	0	0	0	1	0.00%	0	0	0
The Least Bad Party		0	0	0	1	0	0	0	0	0	0	0	0	0	0	0	1	0.00%	0	0	0
Valid votes		1,725	1,500	1,523	7,555	1,807	4,605	2,504	4,302	47,884	1,457	3,624	85,994	5,594	4,080	3,389	177,543	100.00%	8	1	9
Blank votes		18	17	43	104	45	47	28	53	652	42	56	709	49	77	38	1,978	1.10%			
Rejected votes – unregistered parties		0	0	0	2	0	1	1	0	12	0	0	22	3	1	2	44	0.02%			
Rejected votes – other		0	1	0	7	1	6	0	4	48	0	5	66	4	4	1	147	0.08%			
Total polled		1,743	1,518	1,566	7,668	1,853	4,659	2,533	4,359	48,596	1,499	3,685	86,791	5,650	4,162	3,430	179,712	85.79%			
Registered electors		2,126	1,832	1,937	9,233	2,259	5,523	3,048	5,172	56,888	1,843	4,515	99,226	6,699	5,093	4,091	209,485				
Turnout		81.98%	82.86%	80.85%	83.05%	82.03%	84.36%	83.10%	84.28%	85.42%	81.33%	81.62%	87.47%	84.34%	81.72%	83.84%	85.79%				

The following candidates were elected:

- Constituency seats (personal mandates) - Helena Lindahl (C), 1,489 votes; and Edward Riedl (M), 2,309 votes.
- Constituency seats (party mandates) - Pontus Andersson (SD), 1 vote; Isak From (S), 1,866 votes; Åsa Karlsson (S), 1,001 votes; Gudrun Nordborg (V), 565 votes; Helén Pettersson (S), 1,231 votes; and Björn Wiechel (S), 955 votes.
- Levelling seats (personal mandates) - Elin Söderberg (MP), 867 votes.

Permanent substitutions:

- Elin Söderberg (MP) resigned on 2 December 2024 and was replaced by Nils Seye Larsen (MP) on the same day.

==== 2010s ====
===== 2018 =====
Results of the 2018 general election held on 9 September 2018:

Party		Votes per municipality															Total votes	%	Seats		
Party		Åsele	Bjur- holm	Doro- tea	Lyck- sele	Malå	Nord- maling	Norsjö	Roberts- fors	Skellef- teå	Sorsele	Storu- man	Umeå	Vännäs	Vilhel- mina	Vindeln	Total votes	%	Con.	Lev.	Tot.
Swedish Social Democratic Party	S	727	464	753	3,032	843	1,672	1,079	1,703	22,184	540	1,307	29,204	1,944	1,632	1,113	68,197	38.13%	4	0	4
Moderate Party	M	157	284	106	1,122	176	603	202	473	5,849	166	459	12,992	714	327	509	24,139	13.50%	2	0	2
Left Party	V	156	80	183	736	278	426	257	464	4,778	193	413	13,244	737	472	279	22,696	12.69%	1	0	1
Sweden Democrats	SD	280	296	212	1,074	283	760	332	490	5,710	234	645	7,253	740	712	550	19,571	10.94%	1	0	1
Centre Party	C	301	233	256	569	157	632	276	831	4,325	185	416	8,041	733	623	500	18,078	10.11%	1	0	1
Christian Democrats	KD	86	121	84	753	110	273	236	226	2,388	105	299	3,786	338	319	252	9,376	5.24%	0	0	0
Liberals	L	48	79	62	297	76	152	103	107	1,653	29	132	3,971	158	79	92	7,038	3.94%	0	0	0
Green Party	MP	20	23	21	112	20	79	27	121	1,483	30	78	4,620	173	49	69	6,925	3.87%	0	0	0
Feminist Initiative	FI	8	1	10	20	4	12	7	32	222	8	17	607	23	98	18	1,087	0.61%	0	0	0
Alternative for Sweden	AfS	5	4	1	15	2	21	13	22	124	1	6	305	14	19	10	562	0.31%	0	0	0
Citizens' Coalition	MED	1	1	2	4	1	2	0	4	61	8	0	189	6	0	0	279	0.16%	0	0	0
Independent Rural Party	LPo	11	0	27	30	10	2	13	5	15	11	12	19	2	23	5	185	0.10%	0	0	0
Pirate Party	PP	2	0	2	2	0	8	5	4	25	0	1	86	3	7	10	155	0.09%	0	0	0
Direct Democrats	DD	2	0	0	3	1	1	3	2	39	1	2	78	8	3	7	150	0.08%	0	0	0
Christian Values Party	KrVP	0	0	1	2	0	0	2	2	41	0	6	25	12	5	5	101	0.06%	0	0	0
Unity	ENH	0	0	0	1	0	7	1	2	27	0	5	46	3	2	5	99	0.06%	0	0	0
Classical Liberal Party	KLP	0	0	0	0	0	0	0	0	19	0	2	33	1	0	0	55	0.03%	0	0	0
Nordic Resistance Movement	NMR	0	0	0	2	0	2	0	0	10	0	0	28	3	3	1	49	0.03%	0	0	0
Animals' Party	DjuP	1	0	0	8	0	1	0	0	4	0	0	26	1	1	0	42	0.02%	0	0	0
Initiative	INI	0	0	0	1	0	0	0	1	3	1	0	10	1	2	4	23	0.01%	0	0	0
Northern Party	NORRP	0	0	0	3	0	2	0	0	1	2	0	1	0	0	0	9	0.01%	0	0	0
Communist Party of Sweden	SKP	0	0	0	1	0	0	0	0	1	0	0	2	1	0	0	5	0.00%	0	0	0
Basic Income Party	BASIP	0	0	0	0	0	0	0	0	1	0	0	3	0	0	0	4	0.00%	0	0	0
Parties not on the ballot	ÖVR	0	1	0	0	0	1	2	0	1	0	0	5	0	0	2	12	0.01%	0	0	0
Valid votes		1,805	1,587	1,720	7,787	1,961	4,656	2,558	4,489	48,964	1,514	3,800	84,574	5,615	4,376	3,431	178,837	100.00%	9	0	9
Blank votes		19	15	34	75	33	41	32	35	494	37	57	495	29	47	26	1,469	0.81%			
Rejected votes – unregistered parties		1	0	1	2	1	1	0	1	5	2	1	22	2	0	2	41	0.02%			
Rejected votes – other		0	0	1	8	1	4	2	1	20	0	0	34	4	5	1	81	0.04%			
Total polled		1,825	1,602	1,756	7,872	1,996	4,702	2,592	4,526	49,483	1,553	3,858	85,125	5,650	4,428	3,460	180,428	87.89%			
Registered electors		2,138	1,886	2,076	9,321	2,347	5,478	3,092	5,195	56,313	1,922	4,637	95,033	6,523	5,244	4,073	205,278				
Turnout		85.36%	84.94%	84.59%	84.45%	85.04%	85.83%	83.83%	87.12%	87.87%	80.80%	83.20%	89.57%	86.62%	84.44%	84.95%	87.89%				

The following candidates were elected:

- Constituency seats (personal mandates) - Helena Lindahl (C), 2,497 votes; Edward Riedl (M), 2,859 votes; and Jonas Sjöstedt (V), 6,439 votes.
- Constituency seats (party mandates) - Jonas Andersson (SD), 336 votes; Elisabeth Björnsdotter Rahm (M), 666 votes; Isak From (S), 2,031 votes; Åsa Karlsson (S), 1,074 votes; Helén Pettersson (S), 1,186 votes; and Björn Wiechel (S), 910 votes.

Permanent substitutions:

- Jonas Sjöstedt (V) resigned on 3 November 2020 and was replaced by Gudrun Nordborg (V) on 4 November 2020.

===== 2014 =====
Results of the 2014 general election held on 14 September 2014:

Party		Votes per municipality															Total votes	%	Seats		
Party		Åsele	Bjur- holm	Doro- tea	Lyck- sele	Malå	Nord- maling	Norsjö	Roberts- fors	Skellef- teå	Sorsele	Storu- man	Umeå	Vännäs	Vilhel- mina	Vindeln	Total votes	%	Con.	Lev.	Tot.
Swedish Social Democratic Party	S	848	597	921	3,667	1,041	1,996	1,323	1,907	24,468	612	1,567	29,032	2,228	2,032	1,422	73,661	42.03%	5	0	5
Moderate Party	M	221	338	129	1,127	177	631	227	502	5,210	175	510	13,248	717	400	546	24,158	13.78%	1	0	1
Left Party	V	172	79	200	824	266	425	323	403	4,552	209	397	9,907	688	488	281	19,214	10.96%	1	0	1
Sweden Democrats	SD	207	162	179	834	218	433	255	307	3,809	204	450	4,539	475	562	345	12,979	7.40%	1	0	1
Centre Party	C	201	194	204	327	96	527	219	756	2,832	149	365	4,449	594	355	392	11,660	6.65%	1	0	1
Green Party	MP	36	28	30	185	47	107	33	154	2,575	47	117	6,521	241	112	108	10,341	5.90%	0	1	1
Liberal People's Party	FP	98	89	124	297	94	238	95	130	1,865	26	155	3,960	189	115	131	7,606	4.34%	0	0	0
Christian Democrats	KD	65	98	50	575	62	214	130	207	1,940	92	254	3,069	263	244	214	7,477	4.27%	0	0	0
Feminist Initiative	FI	30	16	25	100	30	58	16	100	1,147	28	48	4,826	145	84	67	6,720	3.83%	0	0	0
Pirate Party	PP	10	3	4	13	3	6	4	22	196	2	5	497	34	18	20	837	0.48%	0	0	0
Independent Rural Party	LBPo	3	0	3	7	15	1	0	6	60	4	2	13	2	8	11	135	0.08%	0	0	0
Christian Values Party	KrVP	0	1	0	4	1	0	1	3	30	0	3	58	7	3	10	121	0.07%	0	0	0
Unity	ENH	0	0	1	1	0	4	2	1	30	0	0	57	3	4	6	109	0.06%	0	0	0
Party of the Swedes	SVP	0	2	1	3	0	0	2	3	18	0	3	43	2	3	7	87	0.05%	0	0	0
Direct Democrats		0	0	0	2	0	0	1	1	6	0	1	18	1	0	2	32	0.02%	0	0	0
Classical Liberal Party	KLP	0	0	0	0	0	0	0	0	5	0	1	23	1	0	0	30	0.02%	0	0	0
Animals' Party	DjuP	0	0	0	3	0	1	0	0	7	0	0	15	3	0	0	29	0.02%	0	0	0
Communist Party of Sweden	SKP	0	0	0	0	0	0	0	1	7	0	1	3	0	0	0	12	0.01%	0	0	0
European Workers Party	EAP	0	0	0	0	0	0	0	2	1	0	1	0	0	0	0	4	0.00%	0	0	0
Socialist Justice Party	RS	0	0	0	0	0	0	0	0	1	0	0	3	0	0	0	4	0.00%	0	0	0
Swedish Senior Citizen Interest Party	SPI	0	0	0	0	0	0	0	0	0	0	0	4	0	0	0	4	0.00%	0	0	0
Health Party		0	0	0	0	0	0	0	0	1	0	0	0	0	0	0	1	0.00%	0	0	0
New Party		0	0	0	0	0	0	0	0	0	0	0	1	0	0	0	1	0.00%	0	0	0
Parties not on the ballot		2	0	1	2	0	3	3	2	19	0	1	22	1	0	1	57	0.03%	0	0	0
Valid votes		1,893	1,607	1,872	7,971	2,050	4,644	2,634	4,507	48,779	1,548	3,881	80,308	5,594	4,428	3,563	175,279	100.00%	9	1	10
Blank votes		21	8	22	68	18	44	31	35	509	31	51	614	43	66	21	1,582	0.89%			
Rejected votes – other		4	1	0	3	3	1	1	1	16	0	1	33	0	1	2	67	0.04%			
Total polled		1,918	1,616	1,894	8,042	2,071	4,689	2,666	4,543	49,304	1,579	3,933	80,955	5,637	4,495	3,586	176,928	86.88%			
Registered electors		2,258	1,918	2,211	9,633	2,485	5,579	3,211	5,294	56,848	1,986	4,835	91,291	6,561	5,326	4,218	203,654				
Turnout		84.94%	84.25%	85.66%	83.48%	83.34%	84.05%	83.03%	85.81%	86.73%	79.51%	81.34%	88.68%	85.92%	84.40%	85.02%	86.88%				

The following candidates were elected:

- Constituency seats (personal mandates) - Helena Lindahl (C), 1,234 votes; Edward Riedl (M), 2,089 votes; and Jonas Sjöstedt (V), 5,887 votes.
- Constituency seats (party mandates) - Isak From (S), 1,804 votes; Anna Hagwall (SD), 11 votes; Katarina Köhler (S), 1,559 votes; Veronica Lindholm (S), 1,127 votes; Helén Pettersson (S), 2,668 votes; and Björn Wiechel (S), 672 votes.
- Levelling seats (personal mandates) - Jabar Amin (MP), 856 votes.

===== 2010 =====
Results of the 2010 general election held on 19 September 2010:

Party		Votes per municipality															Total votes	%	Seats		
Party		Åsele	Bjur- holm	Doro- tea	Lyck- sele	Malå	Nord- maling	Norsjö	Roberts- fors	Skellef- teå	Sorsele	Storu- man	Umeå	Vännäs	Vilhel- mina	Vindeln	Total votes	%	Con.	Lev.	Tot.
Swedish Social Democratic Party	S	1,026	578	999	3,979	1,108	2,128	1,322	1,858	23,795	686	1,650	26,766	2,217	2,408	1,488	72,008	42.21%	4	0	4
Moderate Party	M	273	425	208	1,359	306	809	309	616	6,852	247	711	15,800	993	542	734	30,184	17.69%	2	0	2
Left Party	V	149	57	174	697	268	336	341	337	4,568	192	350	8,399	563	392	211	17,034	9.98%	1	0	1
Centre Party	C	192	226	171	355	73	497	270	943	2,865	185	378	5,147	614	313	470	12,699	7.44%	1	0	1
Green Party	MP	37	31	15	265	55	155	75	196	2,780	53	137	7,935	272	129	111	12,246	7.18%	1	0	1
Liberal People's Party	FP	116	129	137	415	141	312	149	174	2,750	57	214	4,987	286	218	211	10,296	6.04%	0	1	1
Christian Democrats	KD	109	104	48	657	89	254	161	271	2,568	122	298	3,620	296	284	244	9,125	5.35%	0	1	1
Sweden Democrats	SD	79	39	53	294	56	156	64	109	1,404	64	128	1,747	142	199	117	4,651	2.73%	0	0	0
Pirate Party	PP	6	9	5	23	5	20	16	32	290	6	16	731	29	33	14	1,235	0.72%	0	0	0
Feminist Initiative	FI	0	1	2	10	2	4	1	8	97	2	3	507	16	4	8	665	0.39%	0	0	0
Norrland Coalition Party	NorrS	16	0	18	11	5	3	13	8	10	1	22	28	3	129	4	271	0.16%	0	0	0
Classical Liberal Party	KLP	0	0	0	1	0	0	0	0	10	0	0	24	1	0	1	37	0.02%	0	0	0
Rural Democrats		0	0	0	1	0	1	6	0	7	3	0	1	0	0	1	20	0.01%	0	0	0
Socialist Justice Party	RS	0	0	0	0	0	1	0	0	1	0	0	17	0	0	0	19	0.01%	0	0	0
Unity	ENH	0	0	0	0	0	0	0	0	1	0	0	8	1	0	6	16	0.01%	0	0	0
National Democrats	ND	0	0	1	0	0	0	0	0	1	0	0	11	0	0	0	13	0.01%	0	0	0
Freedom Party		0	0	0	0	0	1	0	0	0	0	0	5	0	2	1	9	0.01%	0	0	0
Swedish Senior Citizen Interest Party	SPI	0	0	0	2	0	1	0	0	2	0	0	4	0	0	0	9	0.01%	0	0	0
Spirits Party		0	0	0	0	0	0	0	0	4	0	0	4	0	0	0	8	0.00%	0	0	0
Party of the Swedes	SVP	1	0	0	0	0	0	0	0	4	0	0	2	0	0	0	7	0.00%	0	0	0
Communist Party of Sweden	SKP	0	0	0	0	0	0	0	1	3	0	0	2	0	0	0	6	0.00%	0	0	0
European Workers Party	EAP	0	0	0	0	0	0	0	2	1	0	1	0	0	0	0	4	0.00%	0	0	0
Communist League	KommF	0	0	0	0	0	0	0	0	0	1	0	0	0	0	0	1	0.00%	0	0	0
Parties not on the ballot		0	0	0	3	3	1	2	1	7	0	3	14	1	0	0	35	0.02%	0	0	0
Valid votes		2,004	1,599	1,831	8,072	2,111	4,679	2,729	4,556	48,020	1,619	3,911	75,759	5,434	4,653	3,621	170,598	100.00%	9	2	11
Blank votes		15	8	33	79	28	30	32	55	487	31	48	710	52	58	29	1,695	0.98%			
Rejected votes – other		2	1	6	1	1	1	0	5	27	0	1	35	1	3	1	85	0.05%			
Total polled		2,021	1,608	1,870	8,152	2,140	4,710	2,761	4,616	48,534	1,650	3,960	76,504	5,487	4,714	3,651	172,378	85.38%			
Registered electors		2,425	1,933	2,319	9,870	2,594	5,673	3,391	5,413	56,689	2,132	5,034	87,921	6,484	5,603	4,421	201,902				
Turnout		83.34%	83.19%	80.64%	82.59%	82.50%	83.02%	81.42%	85.28%	85.61%	77.39%	78.67%	87.01%	84.62%	84.13%	82.58%	85.38%				

The following candidates were elected:

- Constituency seats (personal mandates) - Ibrahim Baylan (S), 8,484 votes; Maud Olofsson (C), 2,739 votes; Edward Riedl (M), 2,602 votes; and Jonas Sjöstedt (V), 5,507 votes.
- Constituency seats (party mandates) - Jabar Amin (MP), 877 votes; Elisabeth Björnsdotter Rahm (M), 1,252 votes; Isak From (S), 1,130 votes; Katarina Köhler (S), 1,641 votes; and Helén Pettersson (S), 1,185 votes.
- Levelling seats (personal mandates) - Maria Lundqvist-Brömster (FP), 849 votes; and Anders Sellström (KD), 1,343 votes.

Permanent substitutions:

- Maud Olofsson (C) resigned on 30 September 2011 and was replaced by Helena Lindahl (C) on the same day.

==== 2000s ====
===== 2006 =====
Results of the 2006 general election held on 17 September 2006:

Party		Votes per municipality															Total votes	%	Seats		
Party		Åsele	Bjur- holm	Doro- tea	Lyck- sele	Malå	Nord- maling	Norsjö	Roberts- fors	Skellef- teå	Sorsele	Storu- man	Umeå	Vännäs	Vilhel- mina	Vindeln	Total votes	%	Con.	Lev.	Tot.
Swedish Social Democratic Party	S	1,048	560	1,012	3,906	1,155	2,157	1,354	1,746	23,134	695	1,590	27,279	2,144	2,117	1,363	71,260	43.86%	5	0	5
Moderate Party	M	206	301	162	952	222	553	201	436	5,076	213	608	11,681	629	402	571	22,213	13.67%	1	0	1
Centre Party	C	337	314	231	678	189	736	421	1,240	4,624	301	481	7,429	920	579	674	19,154	11.79%	1	0	1
Left Party	V	144	51	167	568	234	283	264	273	4,111	136	325	6,058	418	402	165	13,599	8.37%	1	0	1
Christian Democrats	KD	134	132	60	727	113	302	249	281	2,891	156	386	3,963	356	450	297	10,497	6.46%	1	0	1
Liberal People's Party	FP	99	152	160	476	134	386	125	172	2,750	71	243	4,845	223	270	204	10,310	6.35%	0	1	1
Green Party	MP	22	35	19	210	30	116	45	137	1,959	48	104	6,416	215	105	83	9,544	5.87%	0	1	1
Sweden Democrats	SD	33	5	19	132	14	71	27	34	631	24	45	643	47	65	42	1,832	1.13%	0	0	0
Feminist Initiative	FI	10	7	5	23	6	13	14	40	178	7	15	898	28	20	18	1,282	0.79%	0	0	0
Pirate Party	PP	9	2	3	52	14	17	17	17	274	0	16	757	34	29	21	1,262	0.78%	0	0	0
June List	JL	20	2	10	26	14	23	21	25	246	11	42	342	13	39	26	860	0.53%	0	0	0
Socialist Justice Party	RS	1	0	3	4	1	0	0	5	2	4	0	186	8	1	3	218	0.13%	0	0	0
New Future	NYF	3	7	1	27	4	3	0	0	6	13	25	43	2	2	3	139	0.09%	0	0	0
Swedish Senior Citizen Interest Party	SPI	1	0	1	7	0	7	1	1	28	2	0	33	4	5	3	93	0.06%	0	0	0
Health Care Party	Sjvåp	0	0	0	2	0	0	0	1	35	1	1	25	0	0	0	65	0.04%	0	0	0
People's Will		1	0	0	0	0	1	0	3	4	0	0	30	2	0	1	42	0.03%	0	0	0
Unity	ENH	2	1	0	0	0	1	0	0	3	0	1	19	0	1	6	34	0.02%	0	0	0
National Socialist Front	NSF	0	0	0	1	0	0	0	0	6	0	2	6	0	0	0	15	0.01%	0	0	0
Partiet.se		0	0	0	0	0	0	0	0	0	0	0	0	0	15	0	15	0.01%	0	0	0
National Democrats	ND	1	0	0	0	0	0	0	0	7	0	0	6	0	0	0	14	0.01%	0	0	0
Communist Party of Sweden	SKP	0	0	0	0	0	0	0	1	4	0	1	2	0	0	0	8	0.00%	0	0	0
Classical Liberal Party	KLP	0	0	0	0	0	0	1	0	2	0	0	3	0	0	0	6	0.00%	0	0	0
Active Democracy		0	0	0	0	0	0	0	0	0	0	0	2	0	0	0	2	0.00%	0	0	0
European Workers Party	EAP	0	0	0	0	0	0	0	0	2	0	0	0	0	0	0	2	0.00%	0	0	0
Women's Power		0	0	0	0	0	0	0	0	0	0	0	1	0	0	0	1	0.00%	0	0	0
Parties not on the ballot		0	1	1	3	0	0	2	0	8	0	0	7	1	0	0	23	0.01%	0	0	0
Valid votes		2,071	1,570	1,854	7,794	2,130	4,669	2,742	4,412	45,981	1,682	3,885	70,674	5,044	4,502	3,480	162,490	100.00%	9	2	11
Blank votes		28	17	45	110	33	69	43	67	788	35	78	1,085	56	88	49	2,591	1.57%			
Rejected votes – other		0	0	2	4	0	3	3	4	21	2	2	39	1	3	5	89	0.05%			
Total polled		2,099	1,587	1,901	7,908	2,163	4,741	2,788	4,483	46,790	1,719	3,965	71,798	5,101	4,593	3,534	165,170	82.87%			
Registered electors		2,601	1,996	2,471	9,922	2,665	5,818	3,533	5,431	56,159	2,273	5,172	84,680	6,346	5,734	4,521	199,322				
Turnout		80.70%	79.51%	76.93%	79.70%	81.16%	81.49%	78.91%	82.54%	83.32%	75.63%	76.66%	84.79%	80.38%	80.10%	78.17%	82.87%				

The following candidates were elected:

- Constituency seats (personal mandates) - Ibrahim Baylan (S), 5,726 votes; Ulla Löfgren (M), 1,864 votes; Maud Olofsson (C), 4,773 votes; and Gunilla Tjernberg (KD), 1,132 votes.
- Constituency seats (party mandates) - Karl Gustav Abramsson (S), 1,589 votes; Lars Lilja (S), 863 votes; LiseLotte Olsson (V), 442 votes; Helén Pettersson (S), 901 votes; and Britta Rådström (S), 1,891 votes.
- Levelling seats (party mandates) - Maria Lundqvist-Brömster (FP), 788 votes; and Thomas Nihlén (MP), 555 votes.

===== 2002 =====
Results of the 2002 general election held on 15 September 2002:

Party		Votes per municipality															Total votes	%	Seats		
Party		Åsele	Bjur- holm	Doro- tea	Lyck- sele	Malå	Nord- maling	Norsjö	Roberts- fors	Skellef- teå	Sorsele	Storu- man	Umeå	Vännäs	Vilhel- mina	Vindeln	Total votes	%	Con.	Lev.	Tot.
Swedish Social Democratic Party	S	1,156	629	1,068	3,890	1,073	2,190	1,257	1,684	22,779	791	1,703	28,182	2,181	2,211	1,382	72,176	46.45%	5	0	5
Left Party	V	202	65	213	758	381	338	390	346	5,150	168	402	8,122	559	470	258	17,822	11.47%	1	0	1
Centre Party	C	380	323	245	644	199	656	559	1,316	4,591	274	550	5,526	905	583	697	17,448	11.23%	1	0	1
Liberal People's Party	FP	127	170	178	841	187	406	191	235	4,261	115	323	7,571	338	398	332	15,673	10.09%	1	0	1
Christian Democrats	KD	133	164	90	842	158	460	256	384	3,807	210	460	4,823	432	522	394	13,135	8.45%	1	0	1
Moderate Party	M	114	228	73	423	135	340	117	248	2,265	100	332	4,994	269	145	300	10,083	6.49%	0	1	1
Green Party	MP	42	14	34	162	45	105	48	93	1,612	85	143	4,166	156	153	80	6,938	4.47%	0	1	1
New Future	NYF	36	11	29	69	10	21	17	10	114	23	80	168	2	56	36	682	0.44%	0	0	0
Sweden Democrats	SD	9	4	6	30	2	9	4	7	189	9	14	200	20	27	10	540	0.35%	0	0	0
Socialist Justice Party	RS	0	4	0	11	1	1	1	5	9	1	1	210	2	0	1	247	0.16%	0	0	0
Norrbotten Party	NBP	1	0	1	9	5	2	5	1	60	6	3	55	1	10	2	161	0.10%	0	0	0
Socialist Party	SOC.P	0	0	0	0	0	1	0	1	5	0	3	115	1	0	0	126	0.08%	0	0	0
Swedish Senior Citizen Interest Party	SPI	2	0	2	5	2	4	1	1	36	1	7	47	2	2	1	113	0.07%	0	0	0
The Communists	KOMM	0	0	0	0	0	0	1	0	13	0	0	4	0	0	0	18	0.01%	0	0	0
Unity	ENH	0	0	0	0	0	0	0	0	1	0	0	6	0	0	4	11	0.01%	0	0	0
European Workers Party	EAP	0	0	0	0	0	0	0	0	0	0	0	1	0	0	0	1	0.00%	0	0	0
Other parties	ÖVR	6	1	1	10	1	2	3	5	75	11	4	60	3	12	1	195	0.13%	0	0	0
Valid votes		2,208	1,613	1,940	7,694	2,199	4,535	2,850	4,336	44,967	1,794	4,025	64,250	4,871	4,589	3,498	155,369	100.00%	9	2	11
Rejected votes		30	13	30	78	20	42	20	47	606	25	40	949	51	56	33	2,040	1.30%			
Total polled		2,238	1,626	1,970	7,772	2,219	4,577	2,870	4,383	45,573	1,819	4,065	65,199	4,922	4,645	3,531	157,409	80.70%			
Registered electors		2,798	2,069	2,546	9,901	2,799	5,824	3,601	5,446	55,985	2,425	5,329	79,381	6,317	5,963	4,666	195,050				
Turnout		79.99%	78.59%	77.38%	78.50%	79.28%	78.59%	79.70%	80.48%	81.40%	75.01%	76.28%	82.13%	77.92%	77.90%	75.68%	80.70%				

The following candidates were elected:

- Constituency seats (personal mandates) - Yvonne Ångström (FP), 1,825 votes; Maud Olofsson (C), 6,034 votes; and Sören Wibe (S), 9,891 votes.
- Constituency seats (party mandates) - Karl Gustav Abramsson (S), 2,061 votes; Lennart Gustavsson (V), 1,358 votes; Lars Lilja (S), 864 votes; Carin Lundberg (S), 2,434 votes; Lena Sandlin-Hedman (S), 4,480 votes; and Gunilla Tjernberg (KD), 629 votes.
- Levelling seats (personal mandates) - Ulla Löfgren (M), 1,924 votes; and Ingegerd Saarinen (MP), 678 votes.

Permanent substitutions:

- Lena Sandlin-Hedman (S) resigned on 13 September 2004 and was replaced by Britta Rådström (S) on 14 September 2004.

==== 1990s ====
===== 1998 =====
Results of the 1998 general election held on 20 September 1998:

Party		Votes per municipality															Total votes	%	Seats		
Party		Åsele	Bjur- holm	Doro- tea	Lyck- sele	Malå	Nord- maling	Norsjö	Roberts- fors	Skellef- teå	Sorsele	Storu- man	Umeå	Vännäs	Vilhel- mina	Vindeln	Total votes	%	Con.	Lev.	Tot.
Swedish Social Democratic Party	S	1,233	647	1,082	3,698	1,119	2,070	1,252	1,638	22,653	804	1,604	24,655	2,125	2,287	1,358	68,225	43.22%	5	0	5
Left Party	V	288	98	360	1,380	576	567	557	526	7,182	284	662	10,308	789	849	374	24,800	15.71%	2	0	2
Moderate Party	M	222	337	150	787	265	575	261	479	4,228	209	549	9,057	500	380	519	18,518	11.73%	1	0	1
Christian Democrats	KD	206	244	155	1,086	193	566	390	544	4,759	239	616	6,274	531	554	568	16,925	10.72%	1	0	1
Centre Party	C	258	201	156	305	99	510	353	852	2,898	119	280	3,035	657	276	488	10,487	6.64%	0	1	1
Liberal People's Party	FP	89	185	141	615	113	278	129	223	2,218	75	220	3,568	184	233	259	8,530	5.40%	0	1	1
Green Party	MP	63	40	59	256	68	130	69	167	1,848	119	153	4,276	188	143	151	7,730	4.90%	0	1	1
Other parties		83	24	54	134	54	80	59	30	681	81	176	857	67	165	79	2,624	1.66%	0	0	0
Valid votes		2,442	1,776	2,157	8,261	2,487	4,776	3,070	4,459	46,467	1,930	4,260	62,030	5,041	4,887	3,796	157,839	100.00%	9	3	12
Rejected votes		31	15	47	118	14	56	27	67	580	27	52	1,001	60	55	31	2,181	1.36%			
Total polled		2,473	1,791	2,204	8,379	2,501	4,832	3,097	4,526	47,047	1,957	4,312	63,031	5,101	4,942	3,827	160,020	82.07%			
Registered electors		3,044	2,217	2,713	10,315	2,970	5,967	3,754	5,456	56,709	2,574	5,626	76,207	6,368	6,234	4,824	194,978				
Turnout		81.24%	80.78%	81.24%	81.23%	84.21%	80.98%	82.50%	82.95%	82.96%	76.03%	76.64%	82.71%	80.10%	79.27%	79.33%	82.07%				

The following candidates were elected:

- Constituency seats (personal mandates) - Maggi Mikaelsson (V), 3,041 votes; and Anders Sjölund (M), 2,534 votes.
- Constituency seats (party mandates) - Karl Gustav Abramsson (S), 3,256 votes; Lennart Gustavsson (V), 1,108 votes; Rinaldo Karlsson (S), 2,115 votes; Mats Lindberg (S), 2,252 votes; Carin Lundberg (S), 3,005 votes; Lena Sandlin (S), 4,976 votes; and Gunilla Tjernberg (KD), 720 votes.
- Levelling seats (personal mandates) - Yvonne Ångström (FP), 1,143 votes; Peter Eriksson (MP), 733 votes; and Åke Sandström (C), 1,495 votes.

Permanent substitutions:

- Peter Eriksson (MP) resigned on 31 December 1998 and was replaced by Ingegerd Saarinen (MP) on 1 January 1999.
- Mats Lindberg (S) resigned on 28 February 2001 and was replaced by Lars Lilja (S) on 1 March 2001.
- Maggi Mikaelsson (V) resigned on 1 February 2002 and was replaced by Boel Lindén (V) on the same day.
- Rinaldo Karlsson (S) was killed on 28 March 2002 and was replaced by Marie-Louise Rönnmark (S) on 2 April 2002.

===== 1994 =====
Results of the 1994 general election held on 18 September 1994:

Party		Votes per municipality															Total votes	%	Seats		
Party		Åsele	Bjur- holm	Doro- tea	Lyck- sele	Malå	Nord- maling	Norsjö	Roberts- fors	Skellef- teå	Sorsele	Storu- man	Umeå	Vännäs	Vilhel- mina	Vindeln	Total votes	%	Con.	Lev.	Tot.
Swedish Social Democratic Party	S	1,620	774	1,483	4,936	1,470	2,638	1,815	2,063	28,591	1,043	2,291	30,225	2,765	3,043	1,811	86,568	52.04%	5	0	5
Moderate Party	M	218	303	180	847	225	643	223	459	4,463	209	638	8,593	531	367	545	18,444	11.09%	1	0	1
Centre Party	C	340	375	279	509	164	723	442	1,124	4,793	243	449	4,297	827	453	671	15,689	9.43%	1	0	1
Liberal People's Party	FP	128	243	148	757	174	341	236	374	3,439	129	342	5,969	333	444	388	13,445	8.08%	1	0	1
Left Party	V	138	58	135	615	308	242	296	240	3,708	125	279	5,045	396	381	167	12,133	7.29%	1	0	1
Green Party	MP	110	74	87	366	83	190	135	227	2,368	129	301	4,868	280	266	232	9,716	5.84%	0	1	1
Christian Democratic Unity	KDS	119	142	43	776	108	312	176	315	2,322	158	370	2,667	270	316	295	8,389	5.04%	0	1	1
New Democracy	NyD	18	7	4	40	2	27	8	15	166	19	30	327	31	41	15	750	0.45%	0	0	0
Other parties		14	2	15	71	43	33	24	40	223	47	69	493	48	54	38	1,214	0.73%	0	0	0
Valid votes		2,705	1,978	2,374	8,917	2,577	5,149	3,355	4,857	50,073	2,102	4,769	62,484	5,481	5,365	4,162	166,348	100.00%	9	2	11
Rejected votes		24	11	35	81	17	45	19	55	412	16	45	626	26	40	39	1,491	0.89%			
Total polled		2,729	1,989	2,409	8,998	2,594	5,194	3,374	4,912	50,485	2,118	4,814	63,110	5,507	5,405	4,201	167,839	86.99%			
Registered electors		3,208	2,274	2,821	10,582	3,046	6,009	3,935	5,622	57,361	2,693	5,828	71,788	6,401	6,384	4,998	192,950				
Turnout		85.07%	87.47%	85.40%	85.03%	85.16%	86.44%	85.74%	87.37%	88.01%	78.65%	82.60%	87.91%	86.03%	84.66%	84.05%	86.99%				

The following candidates were elected: Rolf Åbjörnsson (KDS); Georg Andersson (S); Peter Eriksson (MP); Torsten Gavelin (FP); Börje Hörnlund (C); Rinaldo Karlsson (S); Mats Lindberg (S); Ulla Löfgren (M); Carin Lundberg (S); Maggi Mikaelsson (V); and Lena Sandlin (S).

Permanent substitutions:

- Georg Andersson (S) resigned on 31 October 1995 and was replaced by Lars Lilja (S) on 1 November 1995.
- Börje Hörnlund (C) resigned on 31 January 1996 and was replaced by Karin Israelsson (C) on 1 February 1996.

===== 1991 =====
Results of the 1991 general election held on 15 September 1991:

Party		Votes per municipality															Total votes	%	Seats		
Party		Åsele	Bjur- holm	Doro- tea	Lyck- sele	Malå	Nord- maling	Norsjö	Roberts- fors	Skellef- teå	Sorsele	Storu- man	Umeå	Vännäs	Vilhel- mina	Vindeln	Total votes	%	Con.	Lev.	Tot.
Swedish Social Democratic Party	S	1,455	695	1,242	4,233	1,383	2,306	1,541	1,771	24,871	914	1,868	24,537	2,313	2,453	1,521	73,103	45.28%	5	0	5
Centre Party	C	419	378	370	757	220	886	600	1,388	6,462	319	502	5,606	971	628	827	20,333	12.59%	1	0	1
Moderate Party	M	225	281	154	891	251	597	238	468	4,400	226	634	7,766	489	391	503	17,514	10.85%	1	0	1
Liberal People's Party	FP	159	298	174	878	236	379	312	394	4,415	158	481	6,678	425	536	451	15,974	9.89%	1	0	1
Christian Democratic Unity	KDS	186	199	103	1,133	213	509	265	461	4,076	266	649	4,367	475	462	518	13,882	8.60%	1	0	1
Left Party	V	130	34	208	558	163	156	199	165	2,351	136	246	3,630	311	370	117	8,774	5.43%	0	1	1
New Democracy	NyD	96	49	116	301	67	233	100	166	1,373	79	309	2,659	226	246	201	6,221	3.85%	0	0	0
Green Party	MP	35	35	42	157	38	78	77	104	1,110	61	128	3,002	147	143	93	5,250	3.25%	0	0	0
Other parties		3	31	9	26	7	6	33	9	112	5	10	132	6	6	2	397	0.25%	0	0	0
Valid votes		2,708	2,000	2,418	8,934	2,578	5,150	3,365	4,926	49,170	2,164	4,827	58,377	5,363	5,235	4,233	161,448	100.00%	9	1	10
Rejected votes		25	13	41	98	29	47	40	79	592	28	49	836	45	72	23	2,017	1.23%			
Total polled		2,733	2,013	2,459	9,032	2,607	5,197	3,405	5,005	49,762	2,192	4,876	59,213	5,408	5,307	4,256	163,465	86.36%			
Registered electors		3,283	2,337	2,948	10,656	3,079	6,049	4,077	5,711	57,084	2,760	5,978	67,549	6,287	6,428	5,052	189,278				
Turnout		83.25%	86.14%	83.41%	84.76%	84.67%	85.92%	83.52%	87.64%	87.17%	79.42%	81.57%	87.66%	86.02%	82.56%	84.24%	86.36%				

The following candidates were elected: Georg Andersson (S); John Andersson (V); Stefan Attefall (KDS); Lena Boström (S); Hans Dau (M); Börje Hörnlund (C); Rinaldo Karlsson (S); Mats Lindberg (S); Carin Lundberg (S); and Ulla Orring (FP).

==== 1980s ====
===== 1988 =====
Results of the 1988 general election held on 18 September 1988:

Party		Votes per municipality															Total votes	%	Seats		
Party		Åsele	Bjur- holm	Doro- tea	Lyck- sele	Malå	Nord- maling	Norsjö	Roberts- fors	Skellef- teå	Sorsele	Storu- man	Umeå	Vännäs	Vilhel- mina	Vindeln	Total votes	%	Con.	Lev.	Tot.
Swedish Social Democratic Party	S	1,676	773	1,422	4,719	1,472	2,443	1,742	1,853	25,688	1,063	2,273	24,972	2,473	2,857	1,628	77,054	48.37%	5	0	5
Centre Party	C	487	440	439	854	254	1,106	601	1,564	6,915	369	571	6,462	1,107	705	944	22,818	14.32%	2	0	2
Liberal People's Party	FP	223	381	220	1,118	346	485	432	521	5,307	242	658	7,457	484	649	604	19,127	12.01%	1	0	1
Moderate Party	M	158	277	121	747	166	563	209	393	3,510	203	583	6,041	416	303	470	14,160	8.89%	1	0	1
Left Party – Communists	VPK	108	25	155	509	188	163	204	179	2,635	92	181	4,259	291	277	115	9,381	5.89%	0	1	1
Christian Democratic Unity	KDS	136	125	51	828	151	316	166	279	2,430	220	444	2,253	292	340	287	8,318	5.22%	0	0	0
Green Party	MP	100	57	84	267	75	153	91	167	1,685	106	240	3,683	194	239	190	7,331	4.60%	0	0	0
Other parties		5	4	0	30	10	4	40	11	352	17	12	587	19	10	14	1,115	0.70%	0	0	0
Valid votes		2,893	2,082	2,492	9,072	2,662	5,233	3,485	4,967	48,522	2,312	4,962	55,714	5,276	5,380	4,252	159,304	100.00%	9	1	10
Rejected votes		20	11	19	71	25	24	34	40	373	15	47	543	41	25	23	1,311	0.82%			
Total polled		2,913	2,093	2,511	9,143	2,687	5,257	3,519	5,007	48,895	2,327	5,009	56,257	5,317	5,405	4,275	160,615	86.24%			
Registered electors		3,381	2,389	2,994	10,649	3,138	5,954	4,195	5,721	56,514	2,865	6,162	64,674	6,126	6,477	5,011	186,250				
Turnout		86.16%	87.61%	83.87%	85.86%	85.63%	88.29%	83.89%	87.52%	86.52%	81.22%	81.29%	86.99%	86.79%	83.45%	85.31%	86.24%				

The following candidates were elected: Georg Andersson (S); Lena Boström (S); Roland Brännström (S); Hans Dau (M); Börje Hörnlund (C); Karin Israelsson (C); Rinaldo Karlsson (S); Mats Lindberg (S); Maggi Mikaelsson (VPK); and Ulla Orring (FP).

===== 1985 =====
Results of the 1985 general election held on 15 September 1985:

Party		Votes per municipality																Total votes	%	Seats		
Party		Årjäng	Arvika	Eda	Filip- stad	Fors- haga	Grums	Hag- fors	Ham- marö	Karl- stad	Kil	Kristine- hamn	Munk- fors	Säffle	Stor- fors	Sunne	Torsby	Total votes	%	Con.	Lev.	Tot.
Swedish Social Democratic Party	S	1,784	803	1,496	5,035	1,597	2,526	1,851	1,890	26,751	1,080	2,405	25,211	2,596	3,178	1,755	79,958	48.53%	5	0	5	
Centre Party	C	666	575	469	1,633	392	1,424	673	1,850	8,749	630	984	7,996	1,352	1,117	1,235	29,745	18.05%	2	0	2	
Liberal People's Party	FP	277	448	302	1,486	412	566	594	738	6,909	357	850	8,948	610	633	825	23,955	14.54%	1	1	2	
Moderate Party	M	257	324	163	902	222	693	310	541	4,833	241	774	7,691	592	482	646	18,671	11.33%	1	0	1	
Left Party – Communists	VPK	133	29	190	484	158	156	204	150	2,473	103	220	4,359	257	309	110	9,335	5.67%	0	1	1	
Green Party	MP	30	21	26	75	33	37	28	41	416	33	102	1,015	53	80	55	2,045	1.24%	0	0	0	
Other parties		2	7	3	18	2	11	5	8	223	4	9	710	19	8	10	1,039	0.63%	0	0	0	
Valid votes		3,149	2,207	2,649	9,633	2,816	5,413	3,665	5,218	50,354	2,448	5,344	55,930	5,479	5,807	4,636	164,748	100.00%	9	2	11	
Rejected votes		14	6	11	42	10	18	13	29	332	13	36	458	26	14	15	1,037	0.63%				
Total polled		3,163	2,213	2,660	9,675	2,826	5,431	3,678	5,247	50,686	2,461	5,380	56,388	5,505	5,821	4,651	165,785	89.38%				
Registered electors		3,596	2,500	3,039	10,867	3,212	5,960	4,240	5,804	56,450	2,954	6,358	62,461	6,115	6,716	5,203	185,475					
Turnout		87.96%	88.52%	87.53%	89.03%	87.98%	91.12%	86.75%	90.40%	89.79%	83.31%	84.62%	90.28%	90.02%	86.67%	89.39%	89.38%					

The following candidates were elected: Georg Andersson (S); John Andersson (VPK); Rune Ångström (FP); Roland Brännström (S); Hans Dau (M); Christina Flink (S); Lilly Hansson (S); Börje Hörnlund (C); Karin Israelsson (C); Arne Nygren (S); and Ulla Orring (FP).

Permanent substitutions:

- Christina Flink (S) was killed on 27 January 1986 and was replaced by Ture Ångqvist (S) on 29 January 1986.
- Lilly Hansson (S) resigned on 28 February 1986 and was replaced by Mats Lindberg (S) on 1 March 1986.
- Arne Nygren (S) resigned on 30 September 1986 and was replaced by Rinaldo Karlsson (S) on 6 October 1986.

===== 1982 =====
Results of the 1982 general election held on 19 September 1982:

Party		Votes per municipality															Total votes	%	Seats		
Party		Åsele	Bjur- holm	Doro- tea	Lyck- sele	Malå	Nord- maling	Norsjö	Roberts- fors	Skellef- teå	Sorsele	Storu- man	Umeå	Vännäs	Vilhel- mina	Vindeln	Total votes	%	Con.	Lev.	Tot.
Swedish Social Democratic Party	S	1,928	854	1,637	5,137	1,618	2,629	1,890	1,907	27,310	1,131	2,489	25,029	2,627	3,323	1,971	81,480	49.28%	5	0	5
Centre Party	C	658	625	497	1,355	429	1,481	798	1,957	9,371	579	916	9,492	1,406	991	1,250	31,805	19.23%	2	0	2
Moderate Party	M	261	365	202	1,053	272	683	336	606	5,713	259	816	8,631	655	473	725	21,050	12.73%	1	0	1
Liberal People's Party	FP	214	364	204	1,008	245	402	399	494	3,414	253	517	3,991	304	447	586	12,842	7.77%	1	0	1
Left Party – Communists	VPK	119	34	139	454	127	159	185	132	2,278	99	166	4,594	258	286	123	9,153	5.54%	0	1	1
Christian Democratic Unity	KDS	97	92	55	799	118	237	134	205	1,824	209	380	1,518	192	329	213	6,402	3.87%	0	0	0
Green Party	MP	32	16	17	75	27	35	23	46	440	22	93	1,075	43	62	39	2,045	1.24%	0	0	0
K-Party	K-P	0	1	2	4	11	2	29	0	103	15	2	52	0	0	0	221	0.13%	0	0	0
Other parties		0	4	0	3	1	1	1	10	19	1	1	298	11	1	1	352	0.21%	0	0	0
Valid votes		3,309	2,355	2,753	9,888	2,848	5,629	3,795	5,357	50,472	2,568	5,380	54,680	5,496	5,912	4,908	165,350	100.00%	9	1	10
Rejected votes		22	7	10	66	23	24	28	34	383	17	29	526	34	32	27	1,262	0.76%			
Total polled		3,331	2,362	2,763	9,954	2,871	5,653	3,823	5,391	50,855	2,585	5,409	55,206	5,530	5,944	4,935	166,612	90.85%			
Registered electors		3,730	2,603	3,065	10,973	3,206	6,097	4,346	5,870	55,919	3,041	6,265	60,069	6,071	6,687	5,443	183,385				
Turnout		89.30%	90.74%	90.15%	90.71%	89.55%	92.72%	87.97%	91.84%	90.94%	85.00%	86.34%	91.90%	91.09%	88.89%	90.67%	90.85%				

The following candidates were elected: Georg Andersson (S); John Andersson (VPK); Rune Ångström (FP); Roland Brännström (S); Lilly Hansson (S); Börje Hörnlund (C); Karin Israelsson (C); Tore Nilsson (M); Hagar Normark (S); and Arne Nygren (S).

==== 1970s ====
===== 1979 =====
Results of the 1979 general election held on 16 September 1979:

Party		Votes per municipality													Total votes	%	Seats		
Party		Åsele	Doro- tea	Lyck- sele	Nord- maling	Norsjö	Roberts- fors	Skellef- teå	Sorsele	Storu- man	Umeå	Vännäs	Vilhel- mina	Vindeln	Total votes	%	Con.	Lev.	Tot.
Swedish Social Democratic Party	S	1,888	1,582	4,823	2,472	3,316	1,762	25,539	1,096	2,289	22,354	3,110	3,154	1,848	75,233	46.46%	5	0	5
Centre Party	C	693	575	1,506	1,522	1,370	1,980	10,263	633	986	9,919	2,170	1,154	1,304	34,075	21.04%	2	0	2
Liberal People's Party	FP	354	312	1,570	528	849	705	4,975	360	863	7,115	1,009	684	880	20,204	12.48%	1	0	1
Moderate Party	M	249	160	785	630	512	526	5,027	185	710	6,591	907	389	608	17,279	10.67%	1	0	1
Left Party – Communists	VPK	99	106	486	154	341	131	2,020	92	198	4,411	316	265	140	8,759	5.41%	0	1	1
Christian Democratic Unity	KDS	92	30	691	193	215	167	1,647	191	331	1,099	236	287	178	5,357	3.31%	0	0	0
Workers' Party – The Communists	APK	0	2	6	0	54	2	218	29	0	57	0	1	3	372	0.23%	0	0	0
Communist Party of Sweden	SKP	1	3	14	0	1	4	51	0	2	155	8	9	1	249	0.15%	0	0	0
Other parties		4	2	3	2	3	28	48	36	14	242	21	6	4	413	0.26%	0	0	0
Valid votes		3,380	2,772	9,884	5,501	6,661	5,305	49,788	2,622	5,393	51,943	7,777	5,949	4,966	161,941	100.00%	9	1	10
Rejected votes		12	14	28	6	27	15	184	13	13	238	16	23	15	604	0.37%			
Total polled		3,392	2,786	9,912	5,507	6,688	5,320	49,972	2,635	5,406	52,181	7,793	5,972	4,981	162,545	90.43%			
Registered electors		3,823	3,073	10,919	6,013	7,578	5,794	55,052	3,058	6,261	57,389	8,582	6,713	5,490	179,745				
Turnout		88.73%	90.66%	90.78%	91.58%	88.26%	91.82%	90.77%	86.17%	86.34%	90.93%	90.81%	88.96%	90.73%	90.43%				

The following candidates were elected: Georg Andersson (S); John Andersson (VPK); Rune Ångström (FP); Roland Brännström (S); Lilly Hansson (S); Börje Hörnlund (C); Karin Israelsson (C); Tore Nilsson (M); Hagar Normark (S); and Arne Nygren (S).

===== 1976 =====
Results of the 1976 general election held on 19 September 1976:

Party		Votes per municipality												Total votes	%	Seats		
Party		Åsele	Lyck- sele	Nord- maling	Norsjö	Roberts- fors	Skellef- teå	Sorsele	Storu- man	Umeå	Vännäs	Vilhel- mina	Vindeln	Total votes	%	Con.	Lev.	Tot.
Swedish Social Democratic Party	S	3,406	4,611	2,378	3,234	1,746	24,470	1,117	2,167	21,193	3,075	3,023	1,766	72,186	45.28%	4	1	5
Centre Party	C	1,554	1,872	1,733	1,583	2,133	12,173	693	1,344	13,441	2,393	1,456	1,634	42,009	26.35%	3	0	3
People's Party	F	715	1,545	501	926	661	4,764	411	865	5,905	934	676	776	18,679	11.72%	1	0	1
Moderate Party	M	291	695	535	410	410	4,317	148	552	5,017	797	280	520	13,972	8.76%	1	0	1
Left Party – Communists	VPK	205	381	115	349	88	1,681	129	147	2,838	221	231	95	6,480	4.06%	0	0	0
Christian Democratic Unity	KDS	121	696	189	202	161	1,526	218	356	1,046	234	291	201	5,241	3.29%	0	0	0
Communist Party of Sweden	SKP	7	20	1	8	4	173	2	7	318	10	9	0	559	0.35%	0	0	0
Other parties		0	6	0	3	28	29	0	1	228	5	5	4	309	0.19%	0	0	0
Valid votes		6,299	9,826	5,452	6,715	5,231	49,133	2,718	5,439	49,986	7,669	5,971	4,996	159,435	100.00%	9	1	10
Rejected votes		21	27	8	21	6	109	6	5	136	8	16	6	369	0.23%			
Total polled		6,320	9,853	5,460	6,736	5,237	49,242	2,724	5,444	50,122	7,677	5,987	5,002	159,804	90.91%			
Registered electors		6,951	10,825	5,902	7,632	5,675	54,313	3,106	6,241	54,571	8,456	6,603	5,517	175,792				
Turnout		90.92%	91.02%	92.51%	88.26%	92.28%	90.66%	87.70%	87.23%	91.85%	90.79%	90.67%	90.67%	90.91%				

The following candidates were elected: Georg Andersson (S); Rune Ångström (F); Roland Brännström (S); Lilly Hansson (S); Börje Hörnlund (C); Jan-Ivan Nilsson (C); Tore Nilsson (M); Hagar Normark (S); Arne Nygren (S); and Svea Wiklund (C).

===== 1973 =====
Results of the 1973 general election held on 16 September 1973:

Party		Votes per municipality												Total votes	%	Seats		
Party		Åsele	Lyck- sele	Nord- maling	Norsjö	Roberts- fors	Skellef- teå	Sorsele	Storu- man	Umeå	Vännäs	Vilhel- mina	Vindeln	Total votes	%	Con.	Lev.	Tot.
Swedish Social Democratic Party	S	3,151	4,297	2,347	2,994	1,676	22,707	1,084	1,956	19,881	2,973	2,751	1,699	67,516	45.00%	4	1	5
Centre Party	C	1,505	1,687	1,587	1,558	2,046	11,398	583	1,163	12,474	2,281	1,375	1,589	39,246	26.16%	3	0	3
People's Party	F	743	1,494	556	901	657	4,203	450	871	5,279	977	704	818	17,653	11.77%	1	0	1
Moderate Party	M	266	660	516	406	387	3,935	130	478	4,467	797	283	490	12,815	8.54%	1	0	1
Christian Democratic Unity	KDS	167	775	228	245	184	1,721	244	384	1,193	292	311	208	5,952	3.97%	0	0	0
Left Party – Communists	VPK	228	277	64	358	73	1,755	128	183	2,217	201	235	73	5,792	3.86%	0	0	0
Communist Party of Sweden	SKP	13	41	12	23	6	183	4	18	324	29	10	6	669	0.45%	0	0	0
Communist League Marxist–Leninists (the revolutionaries)	KFML(r)	13	13	2	7	7	54	2	4	180	10	6	1	299	0.20%	0	0	0
Other parties		0	1	0	7	0	21	0	0	63	1	0	1	94	0.06%	0	0	0
Valid votes		6,086	9,245	5,312	6,499	5,036	45,977	2,625	5,057	46,078	7,561	5,675	4,885	150,036	100.00%	9	1	10
Rejected votes		6	13	6	4	2	33	4	8	58	2	6	2	144	0.10%			
Total polled		6,092	9,258	5,318	6,503	5,038	46,010	2,629	5,065	46,136	7,563	5,681	4,887	150,180	90.14%			
Registered electors		6,775	10,299	5,766	7,473	5,434	51,139	3,019	5,842	50,854	8,376	6,268	5,365	166,610				
Turnout		89.92%	89.89%	92.23%	87.02%	92.71%	89.97%	87.08%	86.70%	90.72%	90.29%	90.63%	91.09%	90.14%				

The following candidates were elected: Georg Andersson (S); Rune Ångström (F); Roland Brännström (S); Nils-Eric Gustafsson (C); Lilly Hansson (S); Jan-Ivan Nilsson (C); Tore Nilsson (M); Hagar Normark (S); Arne Nygren (S); and Svea Wiklund (C).

===== 1970 =====
Results of the 1970 general election held on 20 September 1970:

Party		Votes	%	Seats		
Party		Votes	%	Con.	Lev.	Tot.
Swedish Social Democratic Party	S	67,177	46.09%	4	1	5
Centre Party	C	31,509	21.62%	2	0	2
People's Party	F	25,325	17.38%	2	0	2
Moderate Party	M	11,412	7.83%	1	0	1
Christian Democratic Unity	KDS	5,434	3.73%	0	0	0
Left Party – Communists	VPK	4,208	2.89%	0	0	0
Communist League Marxists-Leninists	KFML	656	0.45%	0	0	0
Other parties		20	0.01%	0	0	0
Valid votes		145,741	100.00%	9	1	10
Rejected votes		150	0.10%			
Total polled inc. postal votes		145,891	87.85%			
Registered electors		166,063				

The following candidates were elected: Georg Andersson (S); Rune Ångström (F); Roland Brännström (S); Nils-Eric Gustafsson (C); Lilly Hansson (S); Sigvard Larsson (F); Jan-Ivan Nilsson (C); Tore Nilsson (M); Hagar Normark (S); and Arne Nygren (S).
