= Caroline Täljeblad =

Swedish politician (born 1986)

Member of the Riksdag
- Incumbent
- Assumed office 28 September 2026
- Constituency: Västerbotten County
- In office 25 November 2025 – 31 December 2025
- Preceded by: Gudrun Nordborg

Personal details
- Born: 15 October 1986 (age 40) Västerbotten County, Sweden
- Party: Left Party
- Education: Umeå University

Karin Terese Caroline Täljeblad (born 15 October 1986) is a Swedish political scientist and politician for the Left Party. She has been a member of the Riksdag since 2026, elected for the Västerbotten County constituency. She previously served as a replacement for Gudrun Nordborg in 2025, elected for the Västerbotten County constituency.

== Biography ==
Caroline Täljeblad was born in 1986 and grew up in Bjurholm. She studied at Umeå University and is a trained political scientist.

Täljeblad became involved in the Left Party during her studies. She was a member of the Umeå City Council from 2014 to 2018 and was during the same period a deputy on the city council and a member of the cultural committee. She has also worked on issues including urban planning, culture and human rights.

On 25 November 2025, Täljeblad took over as acting deputy in the Riksdag for Gudrun Nordborg during her leave of absence. The assignment lasted until 31 December 2025. She was also an additional deputy on the Committee on Justice from 5 to 31 December 2025.

Täljeblad is a board member of Norrlandsoperan, appointed by Region Västerbotten. In the 2026 Swedish general election, she was placed second on the Left Party's parliamentary list in Västerbotten County.

== See also ==
- List of members of the Riksdag, 2022–2026
- List of members of the Riksdag, 2026–2030
