= Veronica Kerr =

Swedish politician

Member of the Riksdag
- Incumbent
- Assumed office 28 September 2026
- Constituency: Västerbotten County

Personal details
- Born: 1970 (age 55–56)
- Party: Christian Democrats
- Website: https://veronica-kerr.com/

Veronica Kerr (born 1970) is a Swedish political scientist and politician for the Christian Democrats. She has been a member of the Riksdag since 2026, elected for the Västerbotten County constituency.

== Biography ==
Kerr is a trained political scientist and has worked at the Swedish Schools Inspectorate. She has held political positions for the Christian Democrats since 1999.

Kerr has been a group leader for the Christian Democrats in Umeå Municipality and a member of the municipal board since 2010. In 2014, she became first vice chair of the elderly committee and has also held assignments within Region Västerbotten.

In the 2026 Swedish general election, Kerr was elected as a member of parliament for the Christian Democrats in the Västerbotten County constituency. She took office as a member on 28 September 2026.

== See also ==
- List of members of the Riksdag, 2026–2030
