= Erik Gustafsson =

Erik Gustafsson may refer to:

- Erik Gustafsson (ice hockey, born 1988), Swedish ice hockey defenceman playing for Luleå HF
- Erik Gustafsson (ice hockey, born 1992), Swedish ice hockey defenceman playing for the Detroit Red Wings
- Erik Gustafsson (musician), past bass guitarist for Therion
- Erik Gustafsson (sprinter) (born 1943), Finnish Olympic sprinter

== See also ==
- Nils-Eric Gustafsson (1922–2017), Swedish Centre Party politician
- Erik Gustafson (disambiguation)
- Eric Gustafson (1897–1981), Swedish actor
