= Erik Gustafson =

Erik Gustafson may refer to:

- Erik Gustafson (editor) of Sports Car International
- Erik Gustafson (musician) of Surrounded

== See also ==
- Erik Gustafsson (disambiguation)
- Nils-Eric Gustafsson (1922–2017)
- Eric Gustafson (1897–1981), Swedish actor
- Derek Gustafson (born 1979)
