= Lena Sandlin-Hedman =

Swedish politician (born 1969)

Member of the Riksdag
- In office 3 October 1994 – 13 September 2004
- Succeeded by: Britta Rådström
- Constituency: Västerbotten County

Personal details
- Born: 1969 (age 56–57)
- Party: Social Democratic Party
- Relations: Tommy Sandlin

Lena Sandlin-Hedman (born 1969) is a Swedish politician and former member of the Riksdag, the national legislature. A member of the Social Democratic Party, she represented Västerbotten County between October 1994 and September 2004. She quit politics in 2004 after claiming she had been bullied by party colleagues. She is the daughter of ice hockey coach Tommy Sandlin.
