= Helén Pettersson =

Swedish politician (born 1972)

Helén Pettersson in Umeå S

Member of the Swedish Parliament for Västerbotten
- Incumbent
- Assumed office 2 October 2006

Spokesperson for Arbetarnas bildningsförbund (ABF)
- Incumbent
- Assumed office 2012
- Preceded by: Karl-Petter Thorwaldsson

Personal details
- Born: 4 April 1972 (age 54)
- Party: Social Democratic Party
- Education: Brunnsviks folkhögskola
- Profession: Ombudsman

Agnes Helén Pettersson (in the Riksdag Helén Pettersson in Umeå) (born 4 April 1972 in Umeå Parish) is a Swedish Social Democratic politician. She has been a member of the Riksdag since 2006. She currently takes up seat number 109 for the constituency of Västerbotten County. She was first assigned the Environment and Agriculture Committee, a committee in which she served in until 2014. After 2014, she was assigned the Labour Market Committee. She has also been an alternate for the Swedish delegation to the Nordic Council.

Since 2012, Pettersson has been the spokesperson for Arbetarnas bildningsförbund (ABF).
