= Helena Lindahl =

Swedish politician (born 1972)

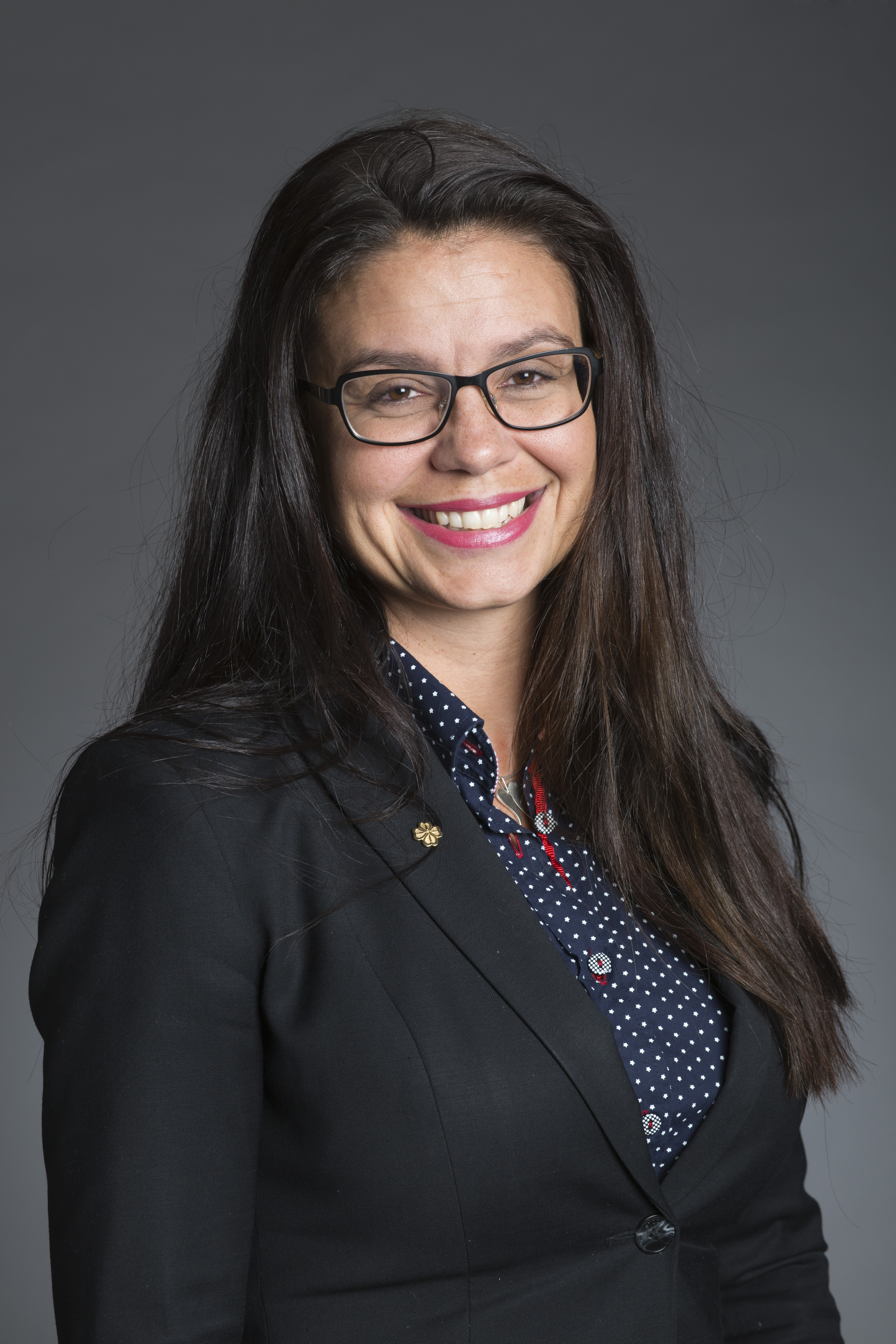
- Helena Lindahl in October 2013

Member of the Riksdagen
- Incumbent
- Assumed office 2010

Personal details
- Born: Helena Sofi Lindahl; 1 July 1972 (age 53)
- Political party: Centre

Helena Sofi Lindahl (born 1 July 1972) is a Swedish politician of the Centre Party who has been a member of the Riksdagen since 2010.

== Political career ==
Since 2010, Lindahl has been a member of the Swedish Parliament, first as minister-replacement, then as a full member after Maud Olofsson had resigned as party leader and MP. She represents the Västerbotten County constituency. In parliament, she is a member of the Committee on Industry and an alternate member of the Committee on the Environment and Agriculture.

== Political positions ==
In 2019, Lindahl voted against the party line and came out against Stefan Löfven’s candidacy as Prime Minister of Sweden in a vote he ultimately won; she was the only Center Party lawmaker to vote against him. When the same vote came up again in 2021, she said that she would follow the party's official line, and later voted for Löfven to continue as Prime Minister. She also voted in favor of approving Löfven's chosen successor, Magdalena Andersson.
