= Committee on Finance (Sweden) =

Swedish parliamentary committee

The (Parliamentary) Committee on Finance (Swedish: Finansutskottet, FiU) is a parliamentary committee in the Swedish Riksdag. The committee's main areas of responsibility concern economics. They are also responsible for examining how central government revenue is added up and compiling the yearly central government budget.

The committee's Speaker is Edward Riedl from the Moderate Party and the vice-Speaker is Mikael Damberg from the Social Democratic Party.

== List of speakers for the committee ==
Name	Period	Political party
Sven Ekström	1971–1973	Social Democratic Party
Nils G. Åsling	1973–1976	Center Party
Björn Molin	1976–1979	People's Party
Eric Enlund	1979–1982	People's Party
Mats Hellström	1982–1983	Social Democratic Party
Arne Gadd	1983–1988	Social Democratic Party
Anna-Greta Leijon	1988–1990	Social Democratic Party
Hans Gustafsson	1990–1991	Social Democratic Party
Per-Ola Eriksson	1991–1994	Center Party
Jan Bergqvist	1994–2002	Social Democratic Party
Sven-Erik Österberg	2002–2004	Social Democratic Party
Arne Kjörnsberg	2004–2006	Social Democratic Party
Stefan Attefall	2006–2010	Christian Democrats
Anna Kinberg Batra	2010–2014	Moderate Party
Fredrik Olovsson	2014–2018	Social Democratic Party
Elisabeth Svantesson	2018–2019	Moderate Party
Fredrik Olovsson	2019–2020	Social Democratic Party
Åsa Westlund	2020–2022	Social Democratic Party
Elisabeth Svantesson	2022	Moderate Party
Edward Riedl	2022–	Moderate Party

== List of vice-speakers for the committee ==
Name	Period	Political party
Sven Wedén	1971–1972	People's Party
Sigfrid Löfgren	1972–1973	People's Party
Sven Ekström	1973–1976	Social Democratic Party
Kjell-Olof Feldt	1976–1982	Social Democratic Party
Rolf Wirtén	1982–1983	People's Party
Björn Molin	1983–1986	People's Party
Anne Wibble	1986–1991	People's Party
Hans Gustafsson	1991–1993	Social Democratic Party
Göran Persson	1993–1994	Social Democratic Party
Per-Ola Eriksson	1994–1998	Center Party
Mats Odell	1998–2002	Christian Democrats
Fredrik Reinfeldt	2002–2003	Moderate Party
Mikael Odenberg	2003–2006	Moderate Party
Pär Nuder	2006–2008	Social Democratic Party
Thomas Östros	2008–2011	Social Democratic Party
Tommy Waidelich	2011–2012	Social Democratic Party
Fredrik Olovsson	2012–2014	Social Democratic Party
Anna Kinberg Batra	2014	Moderate Party
Ulf Kristersson	2014–2017	Moderate Party
Elisabeth Svantesson	2017–2018	Moderate Party
Fredrik Olovsson	2018–2019	Social Democratic Party
Elisabeth Svantesson	2019–2022	Moderate Party
Gunilla Carlsson	2022	Social Democratic Party
Mikael Damberg	2022–	Social Democratic Party
