= Nils Seye Larsen =

Swedish politician (born 1980)

Member of the Riksdag
- Incumbent
- Assumed office 2 December 2024
- Constituency: Västerbotten County

Personal details
- Born: 9 August 1980 (age 46) Eslöv, Sweden
- Party: Green

Nils-Christian Marius Seye Larsen (born 9 August 1980) is a Swedish politician for the Green Party. He has been an ordinary member of the Riksdag for the Västerbotten County constituency since December 2024. He is a member of the Social Affairs Committee and the functional rights policy spokesperson for the Green Party. Larsen has been a leading politician for the Green Party in Umeå Municipality during the 2010s and 2020s. Among other things, he has been the party's group leader in the municipal council since 2018 and has also been chairman of the municipal board's sustainability committee for several years.

Larsen injured his neck in a diving accident in 2005 and has been wheelchair-bound with personal assistance ever since. In addition to climate and environmental issues, he has also been very involved in migration issues since 2010, where he fought for the Nourozi family threatened with deportation and for his assistant and her family when they were at risk of deportation.

As a local politician, Seye-Larsen has been an active blogger on the VK blog since 2018. Among other things, he has highlighted the party's demand that all industrial trawling in the Baltic Sea should cease. He has also highlighted on the blog the Green Party in Umeå's skeptical stance on the issue of a Kvarken Bridge, a proposed bridge between Sweden and Finland. In his role as a spokesperson for disability rights, he has written several posts and articles to improve the conditions for personal assistance and the right to support measures according to LSS for people with disabilities..

== See also ==
- List of members of the Riksdag, 2022–2026
- List of members of the Riksdag, 2026–2030
