= Julia Algotsson =

Swedish politician (born 1996)

Member of the Riksdag
- Incumbent
- Assumed office 28 September 2026
- Constituency: Västerbotten County

Personal details
- Born: 12 August 1996 (age 30)
- Party: Centre Party

Julia Johanna Linn Algotsson (born 12 August 1996) is a Swedish politician who was elected member of the Riksdag in 2026. She is the deputy chairwoman of the Centre Party in Västerbotten County.
