= Veronica Lindholm =

Swedish politician (born 1984)

Member of the Riksdag
- In office 29 September 2014 – 24 September 2018
- Constituency: Västerbotten County

Personal details
- Born: 1984 (age 41–42)
- Party: Social Democrats

Veronica Lindholm (born 1984) is a Swedish politician. She served as member of the Riksdag from 29 September 2014 to 24 September 2018, representing the constituency of Västerbotten County.
