= Elin Söderberg =

Swedish politician (born 1984)

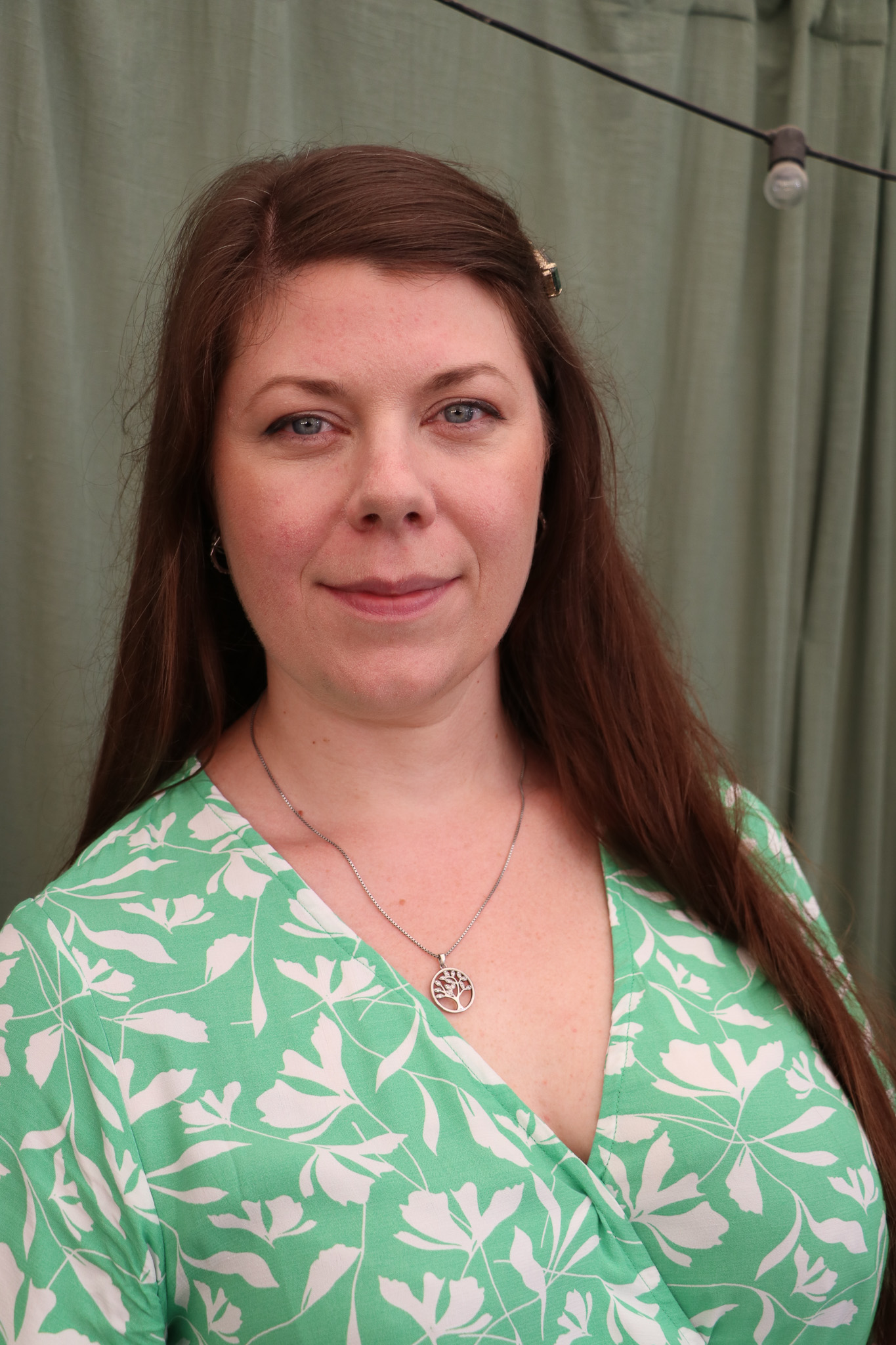
- Elin Söderberg (2023)

Member of the Riksdag
- Incumbent
- Assumed office 26 September 2022
- Constituency: Västerbotten County

Personal details
- Born: 1984 (age 41–42)
- Party: Green Party

Elin Söderberg (born 1984) is a Swedish politician. She was elected as Member of the Riksdag in September 2022. She represents the constituency of Västerbotten County. She is affiliated with the Green Party.
