= Carin Lundberg =

Swedish politician (born 1944)

Member of the Riksdag
- In office 30 September 1991 – 2 October 2006
- Constituency: Västerbotten County

Personal details
- Born: 1944 (age 81–82)
- Party: Social Democratic Party

Carin Ingeborg Lundberg (born 1944) is a Swedish politician and former member of the Riksdag, the national legislature. A member of the Social Democratic Party, she represented Västerbotten County between September 1991 and October 2006.
