= Katarina Köhler =

Swedish politician (born 1954)

Member of the Riksdag
- In office 4 October 2010 – 24 September 2018
- Constituency: Västerbotten County

Personal details
- Born: Katarina Köhler; 1954 (age 71–72)
- Party: Social Democratic Party

Katarina Köhler (born 1954) is a Swedish politician, teacher and former member of the Riksdag, the national legislature. A member of the Social Democratic Party, she represented Västerbotten County between October 2010 and September 2018. She had previously been a substitute member of the Riksdag for Ibrahim Baylan twice: October 2006; and September 2007 to December 2007.

Köhler is the daughter of farmer Gunnar Köhler and Aili Regina Köhler. She was educated in Gällivare. She studied organisational development and leadership at Dalarna University and process pedagogy at Luleå University of Technology. She was a teacher in Skellefteå from 1986 to 1992 and from 1994 to 2010. She was a member of the municipal council in Skellefteå Municipality from 2006 to 2010.
