= Isak From =

Swedish politician (born 1967)

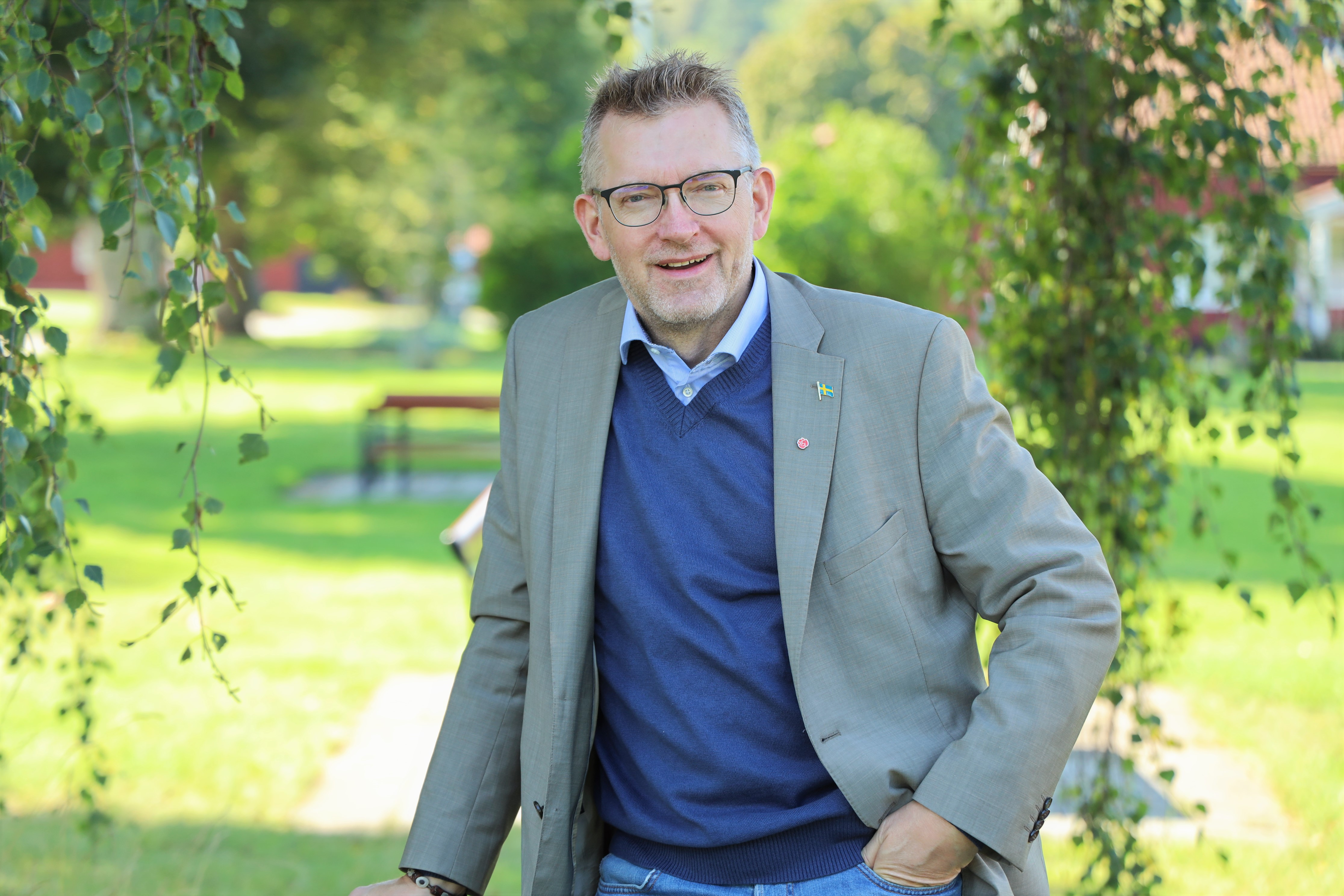
- From in August 2021

Member of the Riksdag
- Incumbent
- Assumed office 4 October 2010
- Constituency: Västerbotten County

Personal details
- Born: Lars Isak Anders From; 1967 (age 58–59)
- Party: Social Democratic Party

Lars Isak Anders From (born 1967) is a Swedish politician, trade unionist and member of the Riksdag, the national legislature. A member of the Social Democratic Party, he has represented Västerbotten County since October 2010.

From is the son of farmer/miner Helmer Frohm and programmer May Frohm (née Norberg). He was educated in Gothenburg and received vocational training (AMU) in Gällivare. He has held various skilled manual work including at Volvo and TGB Group. He has held various roles at the IF Metall trade union. He has been a member of the municipal council in Norsjö Municipality since 2002.
