= Björn Wiechel =

Swedish politician (born 1983)

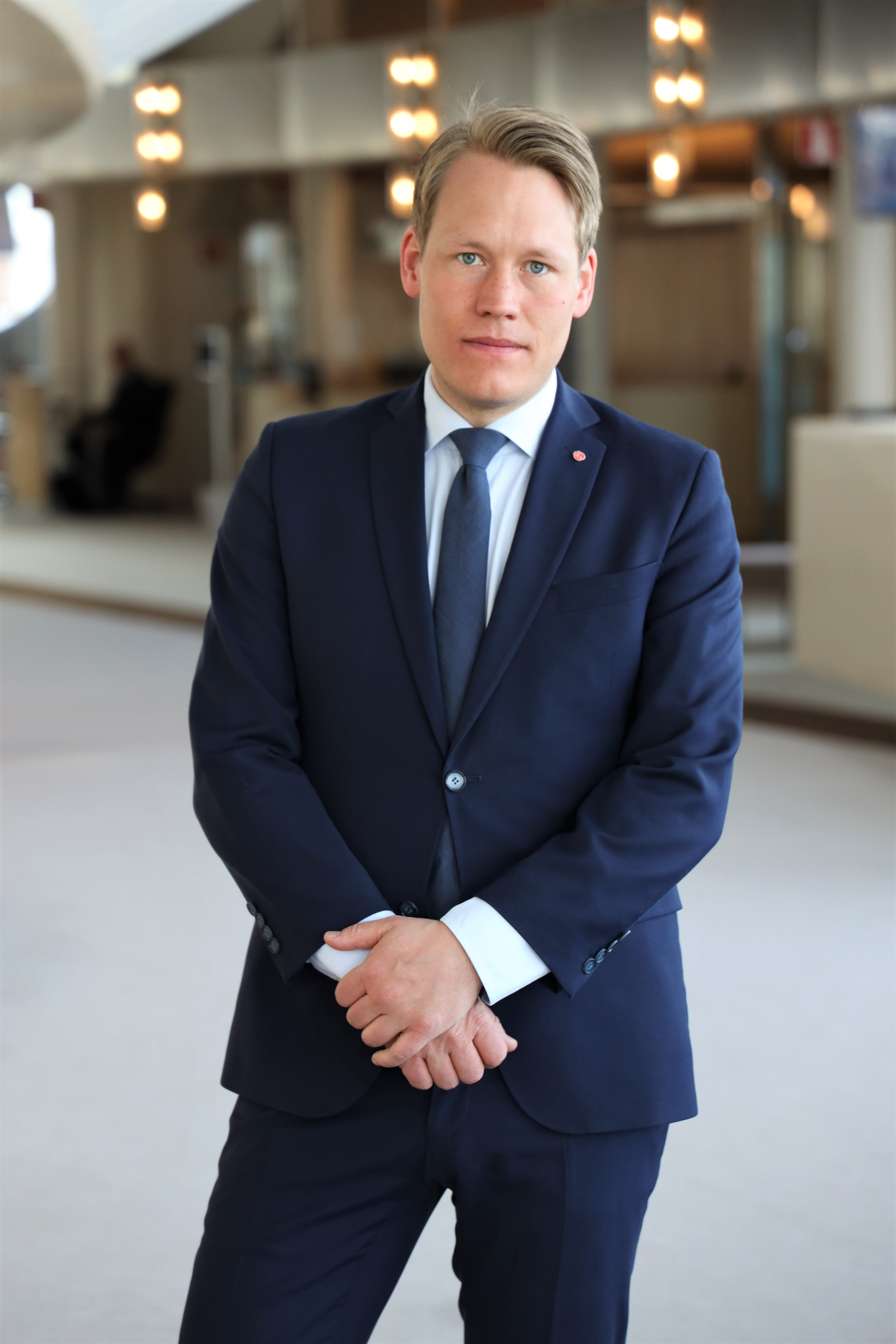
- Wiechel in 2022

Member of the Riksdag
- Incumbent
- Assumed office 29 September 2014
- Constituency: Västerbotten County

Personal details
- Born: Björn Göran Sebastian Wiechel; 1983 (age 42–43)
- Party: Social Democratic Party
- Education: Umeå University

Björn Göran Sebastian Wiechel (born 1983) is a Swedish politician and member of the Riksdag, the national legislature. A member of the Social Democratic Party, he has represented Västerbotten County since September 2014.

Wiechel is the son of journalist Hans Wiechel and Susanne Waldau. He was educated in Umeå and studied cultural geography at Umeå University. He worked as a store assistant at Clas Ohlson in Umeå (2001–2012), a bartender in Umeå (2008–2011) and a high school teacher in Umeå (2009–2011). He is the cousin of Markus Wiechel, a member of the Riksdag for the far right Sweden Democrats.
