= Jabar Amin =

Swedish politician (born 1959)

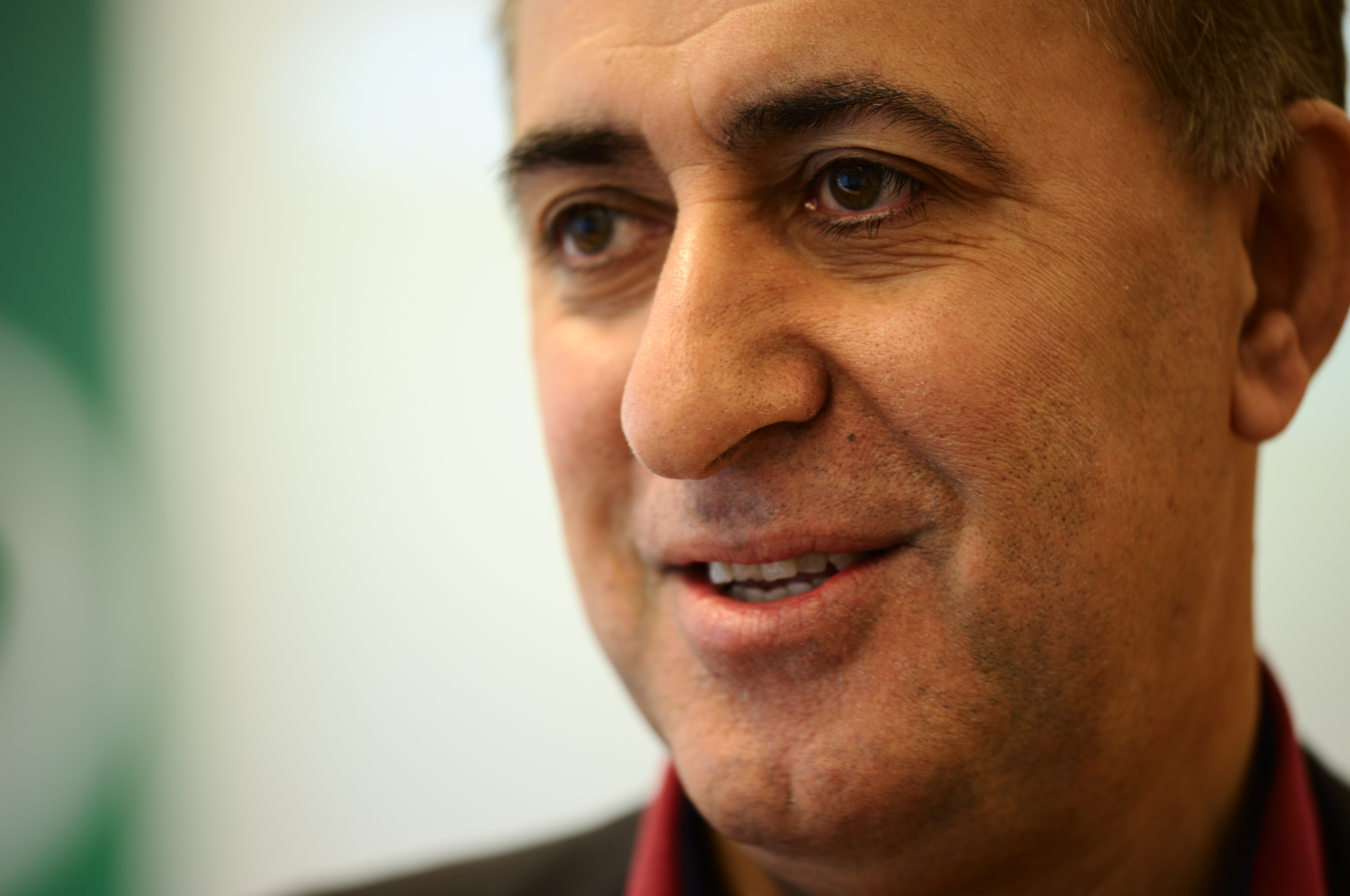
- Amin in July 2013

Member of the Riksdag
- In office 4 October 2010 – 24 September 2018
- Constituency: Västerbotten County

Personal details
- Born: 1959 (age 66–67)
- Party: Green Party
- Education: Umeå University

Jabar Karim Mohamad Amin (born 1959) is a Swedish politician and former member of the Riksdag, the national legislature. A member of the Green Party, he represented Västerbotten County between October 2010 and September 2018.

Amin studied mathematics at Umeå University. He has a political science degree from the university. He has been an interpreter, case manager, project manager and business manager. He was a member of the municipal council in Umeå Municipality between 2006 and 2010.

Amin, who is a Kurd, claimed to have nominated Kurdistan Workers' Party leader Abdullah Öcalan for the 2014 Nobel Peace Prize. Amin was meant to be part of the Organization for Security and Co-operation in Europe's election observer group for the 2018 Turkish presidential election but was blocked, along with German MP Andrej Hunko, from entering Turkey.
