= Åsa Westlund =

Swedish politician (born 1976)

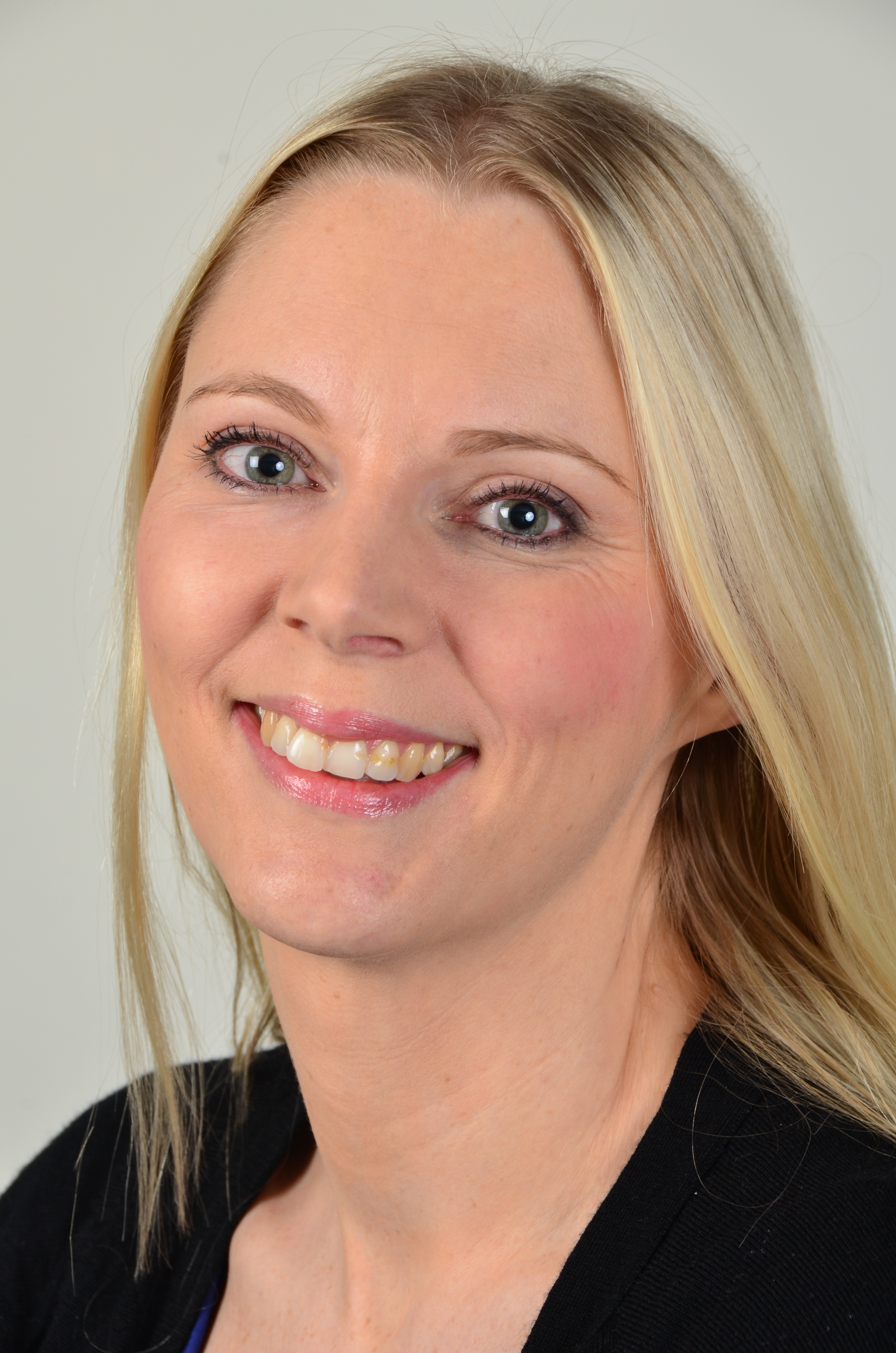
- Westlund in February 2014

Member of the Riksdag
- In office 30 September 2014 – present
- Constituency: Stockholm County

Member of the European Parliament
- In office 2004–2014

Personal details
- Born: Åsa Ingrid Gunilla Westlund; 19 May 1976 (age 50) Anderstorp, Jönköping County, Sweden
- Party: Swedish Social Democratic Party

Åsa Ingrid Gunilla Westlund (born 19 May 1976 in Anderstorp, Jönköping County, Småland, Sweden) is a Swedish politician who has been Member of the Riksdag since 2014, representing Stockholm County. In the Riksdag, she is chairman of the Committee on Finance since 2020.

She was previously a Member of the European Parliament for the Swedish Social Democratic Party, part of the Party of European Socialists, from 2004 to 2014.
