= Malin Malm =

Swedish politician (born 1994)

Member of the Riksdag
- Incumbent
- Assumed office 28 September 2026
- Constituency: Västerbotten County

Personal details
- Born: 2 June 1994 (age 32)
- Party: Social Democratic Party

Malin Malm (born 2 June 1994) is a Swedish politician who was elected member of the Riksdag in 2026. From 2019 to 2021, she served as chairwoman of the Social Democratic Students of Sweden.
