= Edward Riedl =

Swedish politician (born 1976)

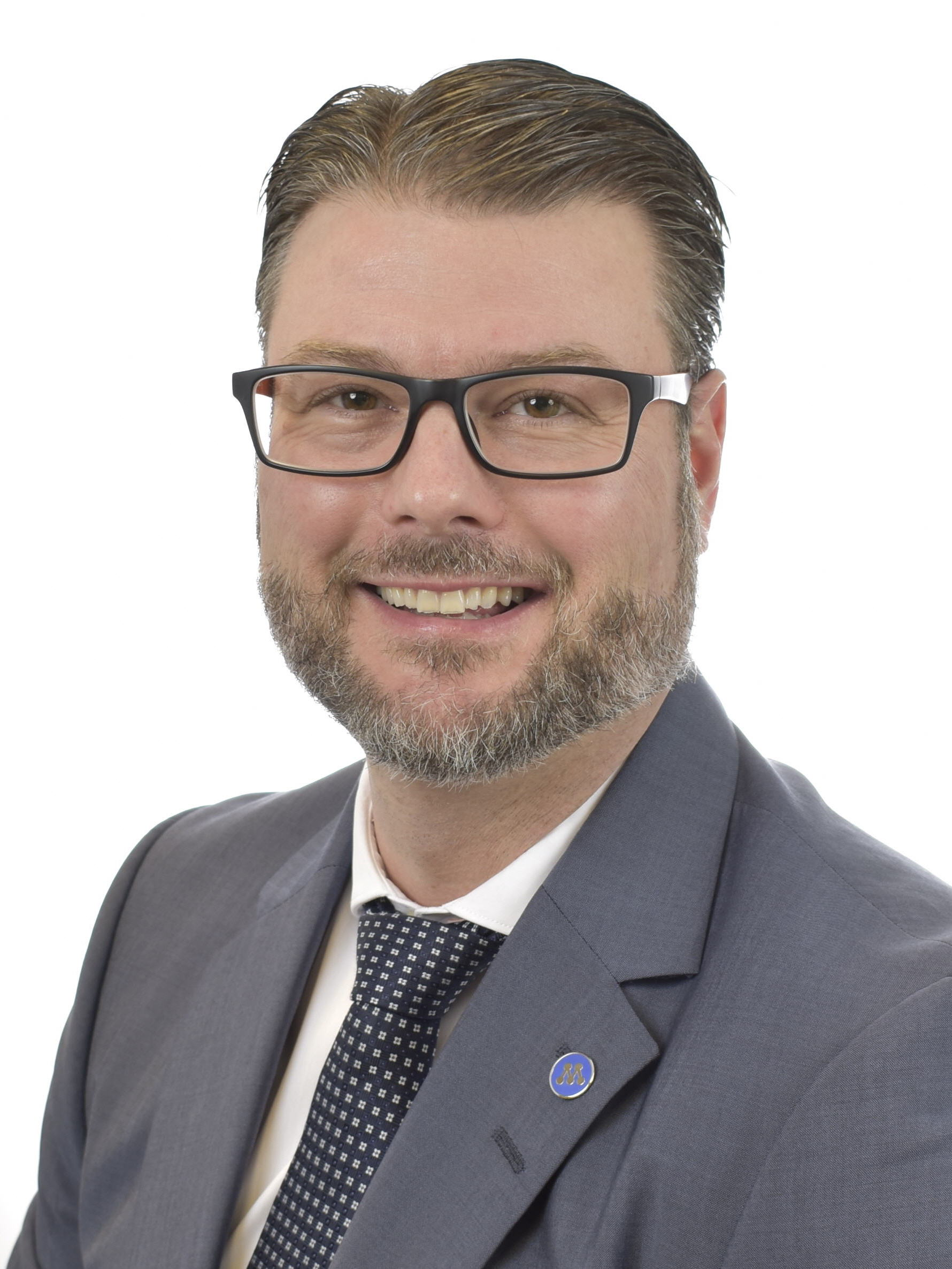
- Riedl in 2022

Member of the Riksdag
- Incumbent
- Assumed office 12 October 2010
- Constituency: Västerbotten County

Personal details
- Born: 1 July 1976 (age 50)
- Party: Moderate Party

Edward Riedl (born 1 July 1976) is a Swedish politician serving as a member of the Riksdag since 2010. He has served as chairman of the Committee on Finance since 2022.
