= Åsa Karlsson =

Swedish politician (born 1973)

Member of the Riksdag
- Incumbent
- Assumed office 24 September 2018
- Constituency: Västerbotten County

Personal details
- Born: Åsa Ulrika Burman; 1973 (age 52–53)
- Party: Social Democratic Party
- Education: Mid Sweden University

Åsa Ulrika Karlsson (née Burman; born 1973) is a Swedish politician, teacher and member of the Riksdag, the national legislature. A member of the Social Democratic Party, she has represented Västerbotten County since September 2018.

Karlsson is the daughter of factory worker Henry Burman and Ingrid Burman (née Söderström). She was educated in Skellefteå and has a teaching degree from Mid Sweden University. She has worked as a child minder and school teacher.
