= Ulla Orring =

Swedish politician (born 1926)

Personal details
- Born: 15 September 1926 (age 99)
- Party: People's Party

Ulla Orring (born 15 September 1926) is a Swedish liberal politician. She is a member of the People's Party which she joined in the 1950s. She served in the Swedish Parliament for many years and was first elected as a deputy in 1985. She served as first vice-chairman of the municipal council in Umeå until 2006 when she resigned from the post.
