= Region Västerbotten =

Regional council for Västerbotten County, Sweden

Coordinates: 63°48′52″N 20°18′27″E

- Regional Council
- Formation: 2019
- County: Västerbotten County
- Country: Sweden
- Website: www.regionvasterbotten.se

Legislative branch
- Legislature: Regional Council
- Assembly members: 71

Executive branch
- Chairman of the Regional Executive Board: Peter Olofsson
- Headquarters: Umeå

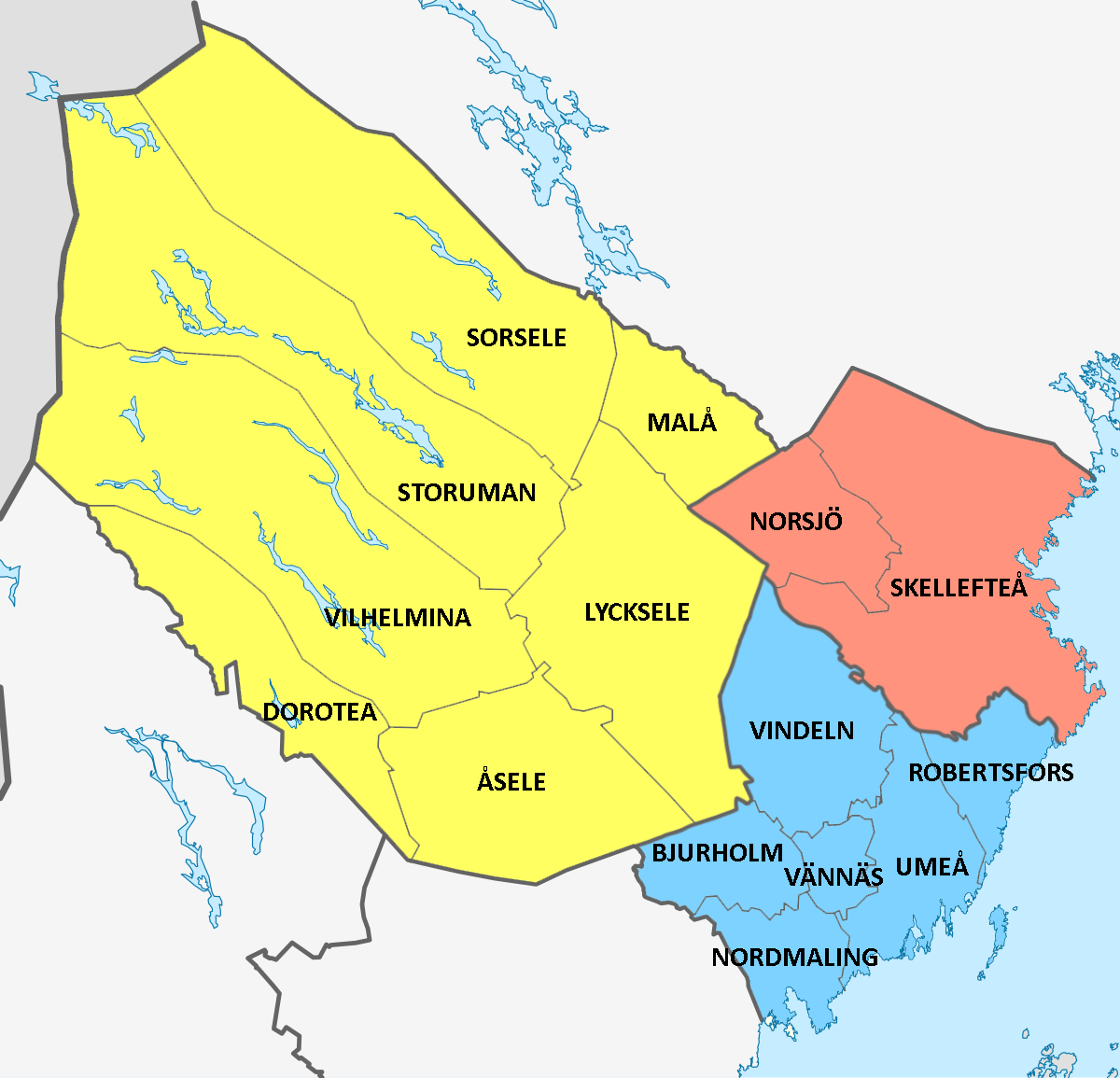
Electoral districts of Västerbotten County for regional council elections

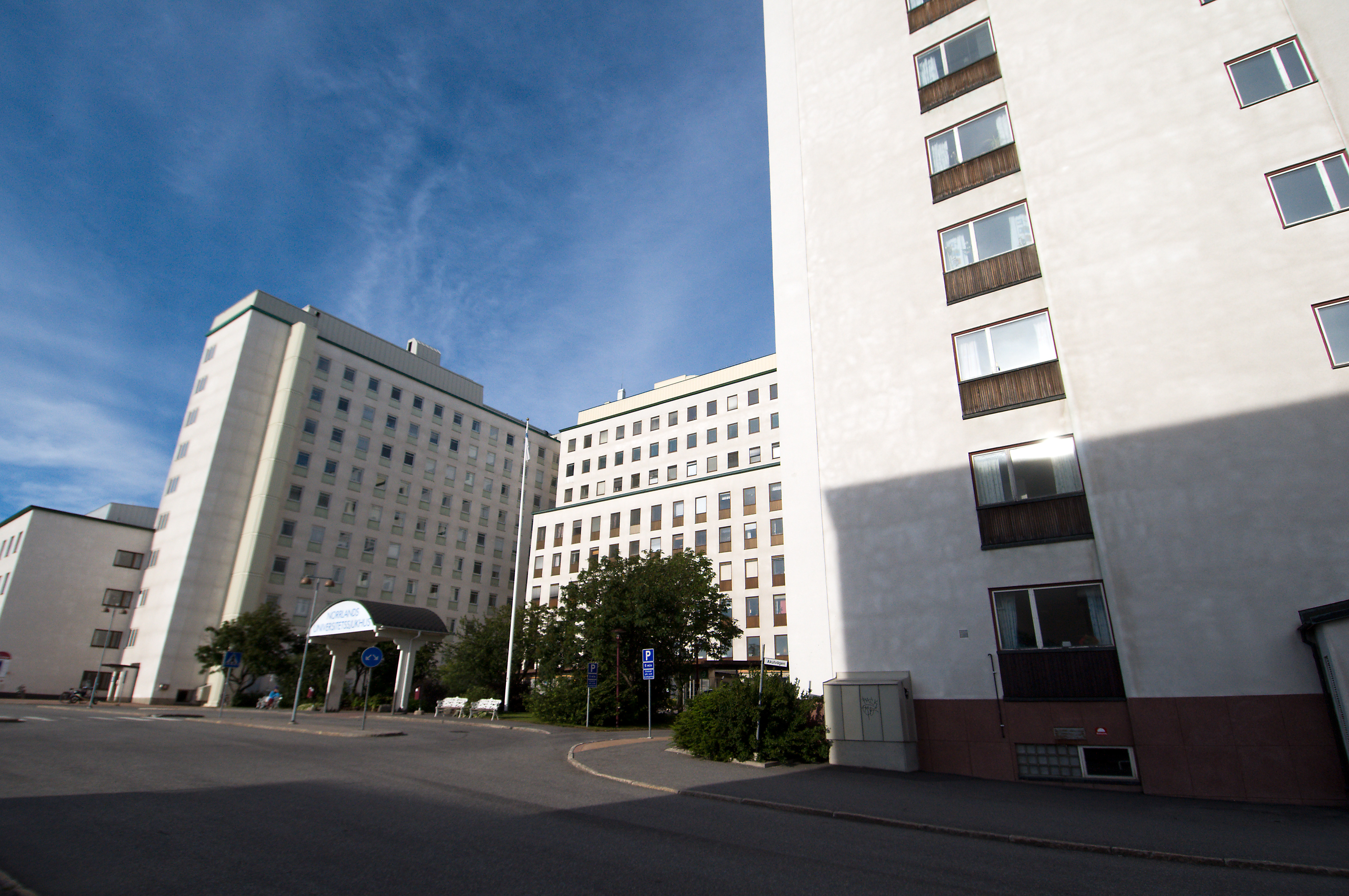
Norrlands University Hospital in Umeå

Region Västerbotten, formerly known as Västerbotten County Council (Swedish: Västerbottens läns landsting), is the regional council for Västerbotten County, Sweden. The Region is primarily responsible for healthcare and public transport but also oversees regional development and culture.

== Formation ==
On 1 January 2019, Västerbotten County Council merged with the regional federation and certain business support functions from the county administrative board, forming Region Västerbotten.

== Responsibilities ==
=== Healthcare ===
Region Västerbotten is responsible for providing healthcare services in Västerbotten County, including specialised care for northern Sweden and national specialist care for brachial plexus injuries.

==== Hospitals ====
- Lycksele Hospital
- Skellefteå Hospital
- Norrlands University Hospital in Umeå

The region operates health centres across all municipalities. Some centres also function as local hospitals with inpatient care.

=== Public transport ===
Region Västerbotten manages public transport in the county through Länstrafiken i Västerbotten, which operates bus and rail services in cooperation with other northern regions.

=== Regional development ===
The Region is responsible for economic growth, infrastructure, tourism, digitalisation, education, and cultural initiatives.

=== Education and research ===
Region Västerbotten collaborates with Umeå University on medical research and innovation. It also operates Vindeln Folk High School and Storuman Folk High School.

== Politics ==
Region Västerbotten is governed by the Regional Council, with the Regional Executive Board handling executive matters.

== Municipalities ==
- Bjurholm Municipality
- Dorotea Municipality
- Lycksele Municipality
- Malå Municipality
- Nordmaling Municipality
- Norsjö Municipality
- Robertsfors Municipality
- Skellefteå Municipality
- Sorsele Municipality
- Storuman Municipality
- Umeå Municipality
- Vilhelmina Municipality
- Vindeln Municipality
- Vännäs Municipality
- Åsele Municipality
