= Lars Lilja =

Swedish politician (born 1954)

Lars Lilja (born 1954) is a Swedish social democratic politician who has been a member of the Riksdag between 1995–1998 and since 2001.
