= Gudrun Nordborg =

Swedish politician (born 1946)

Member of the Riksdag
- Incumbent
- Assumed office 3 November 2020
- Constituency: Västerbotten County

Personal details
- Born: 1946 (age 79–80)
- Party: Left Party

Gudrun Nordborg (born 1946) is a Swedish politician. Since November 2020, she serves as Member of the Riksdag representing the constituency of Västerbotten County. She became a member after Jonas Sjöstedt resigned.

She was also elected as Member of the Riksdag in September 2022.
