= Ulla Löfgren =

Swedish politician

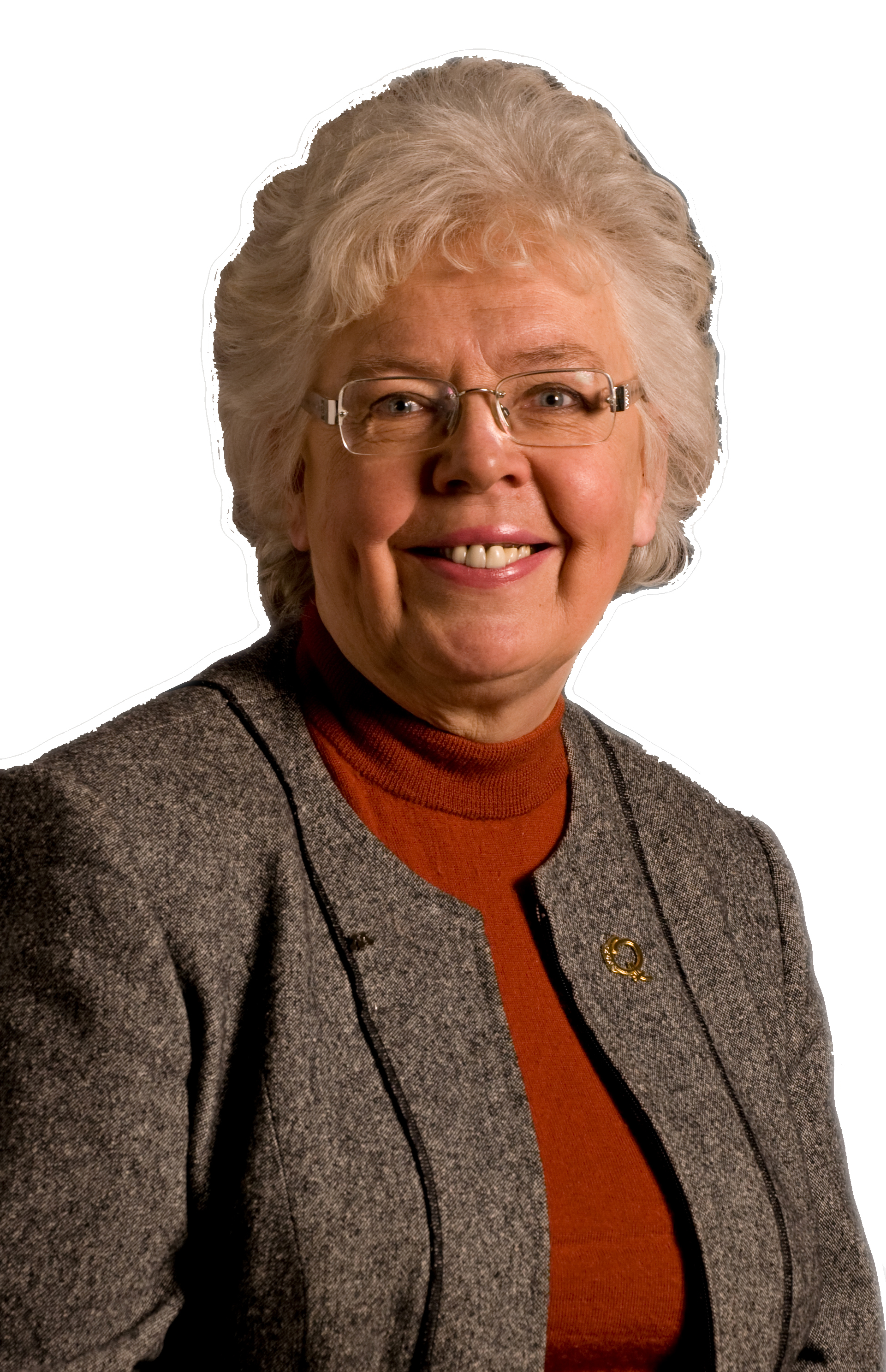

Ulla Löfgren (born 1943) is a Swedish politician of the Moderate Party. She has been a member of the Riksdag from 1994 until 1998 and then again from 2002 until 2008.
