= Peter Eriksson =

Peter Eriksson may refer to:

- Peter Eriksson (Swedish Green Party politician) (born 1958), spokesperson for the Swedish Green Party
- Peter Eriksson (Sweden Democrats politician), member of the Riksdag
- Peter Eriksson (neuroscientist) (1959–2007), Swedish stem cell neuroscientist
- Peter Eriksson (equestrian) (born 1959), Olympic medallist in equestrian events
- Peter Eriksson (ice hockey) (born 1965), retired Swedish professional ice hockey left winger
- Peter Eriksson (footballer) (born 1969), Swedish footballer
- Peter Eriksson (coach) (born 1952), athletics coach
- Peter Eriksson (curler) (born 1964), Swedish curler
- Peter Eriksson (sailor) (born 1960), Swedish Olympic sailor
