= Gunilla Tjernberg =

Swedish politician (1950–2019)

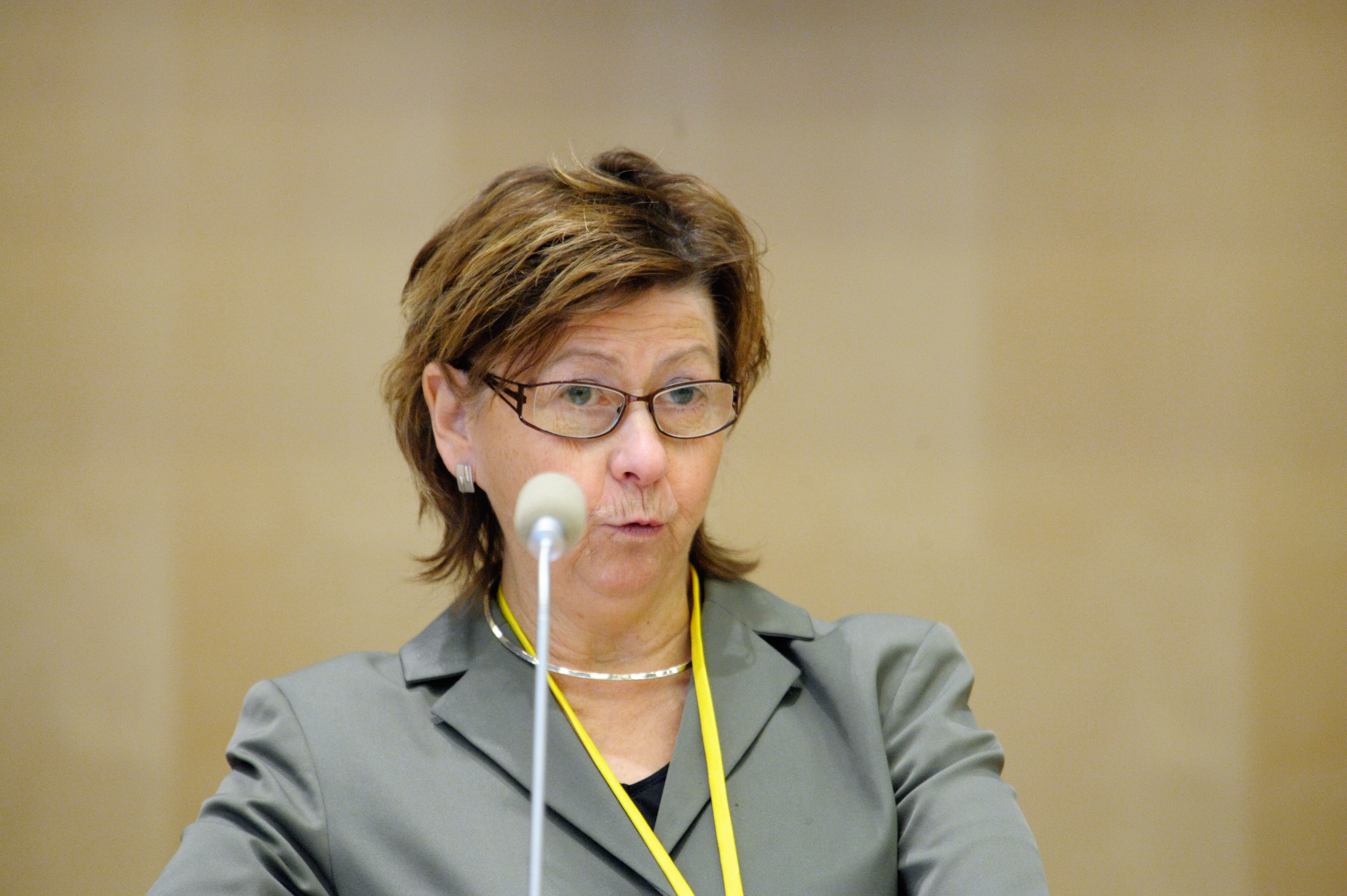

Gunilla Tjernberg (1950 – 22 July 2019) was a Swedish Christian Democratic politician. She had been a member of the Riksdag since 1998.
