= Vilhelmina Municipality =

Vilhelmina Municipality Vilhelmina kommun
- Municipality
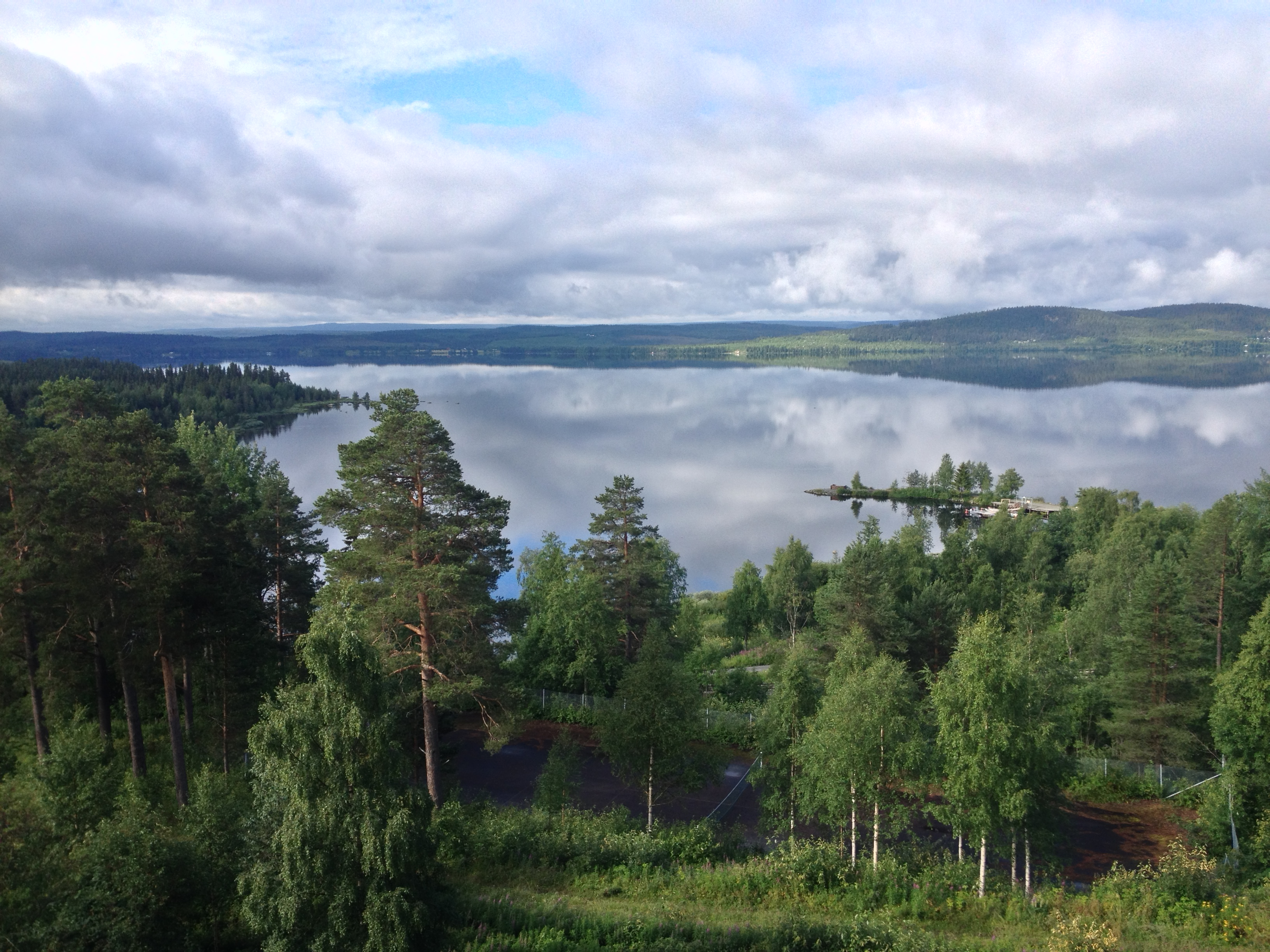
- Looking across Volgsjön on a summer morning

- Coat of arms

- Coordinates: 64°37′N 16°39′E
- Country: Sweden
- County: Västerbotten County
- Seat: Vilhelmina

Area
  - Total: 8,740.5 km^{2} (3,374.7 sq mi)
  - Land: 8,047.87 km^{2} (3,107.30 sq mi)
  - Water: 692.63 km^{2} (267.43 sq mi)
- Area as of 1 January 2014.

Population (30 June 2025)
  - Total: 6,212
  - Density: 0.7719/km^{2} (1.999/sq mi)
- Time zone: UTC+1 (CET)
  - Summer (DST): UTC+2 (CEST)
- ISO 3166 code: SE
- Province: Lapland
- Municipal code: 2462
- Website: www.vilhelmina.se

Vilhelmina Municipality (Swedish: Vilhelmina kommun; Southern Sami: Vualtjeren tjïelte) is a municipality in Västerbotten County in northern Sweden. Its seat is located in Vilhelmina.

== History ==
In 1804 the parish of Volgsjö was renamed Vilhelmina in honour of Queen Frederica Dorothea Wilhelmina of Sweden.

In 1947 the locality Vilhelmina was detached from the rural municipality with the same name, forming the market town (köping) of Vilhelmina. The two entities were reunited in 1965.

== Geography ==
Like the rest of northern Sweden (Norrland), it is scarcely populated due to its inhospitable conditions and cold climate, but is superb for those who like wildlife and untouched nature.

=== Localities ===
There is only one locality (or urban area) in Vilhelmina Municipality:

#	Locality	Population
1	Vilhelmina	3,633

== Demographics ==
This is a demographic table based on Vilhelmina Municipality's electoral districts in the 2022 Swedish general election sourced from SVT's election platform, in turn taken from SCB official statistics.

In total there were 6,473 residents, including 5,093 Swedish citizens of voting age. 51.6% voted for the left coalition and 46.7% for the right coalition. Indicators are in percentage points except population totals and income.

Location	Residents	Citizen adults	Left vote	Right vote	Employed	Swedish parents	Foreign heritage	Income SEK	Degree
Location			%	%					
Baksjönäs	1,540	1,240	54.8	43.1	78	90	10	21,615	28
Dikanäs	366	343	57.7	40.6	82	96	4	18,250	21
Latikberg	518	388	45.8	52.8	86	95	5	24,353	32
Lövliden	1,086	721	57.5	39.7	81	80	20	23,213	27
Nästansjö	414	323	42.7	54.7	82	97	3	23,329	21
Skansholm	780	614	44.3	54.6	83	96	4	22,553	25
Vilhelmina C	1,330	1,084	52.7	45.7	80	91	9	22,176	25
Vilhelmina-Saxnäs	439	380	53.4	46.2	82	95	5	21,741	27
Source: SVT

== Culture ==
Every July the town of Vilhelmina holds a festival called Hembygdsdagarna Vilhelmina. In addition to popular and folk music performances, tradition holds that a local engaged couple is selected each year to get married during the festival. The bride and groom lead a parade of fiddlers and other traditionally dressed Swedes through town to the church where the marriage is performed in front of all who wish to attend. They are not always able to find a couple willing to get married, however, so some years they hold the parade without an engaged couple, and hold a public church service instead of a wedding.
