= Nils-Eric Gustafsson =

Swedish politician (1922–2017)

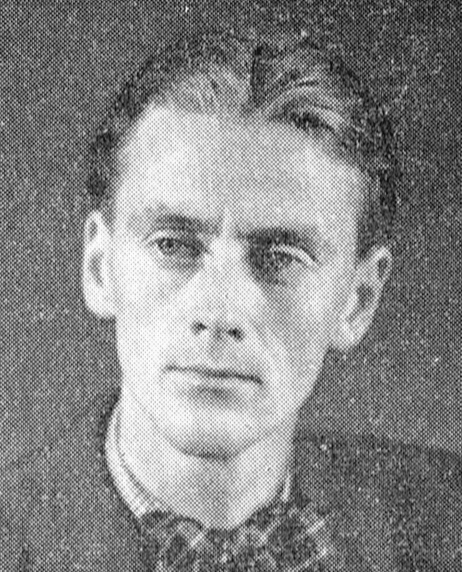

Nils-Eric Gustafsson (December 30, 1922 – 2017) was a Swedish politician and a member of the Centre Party.
