= Konstvägen sju älvar =

Tourist and sculpture route in Sweden

Konstvägen sju älvar (The Seven Rivers Art Way) is a tourist and sculpture route in Västerbotten County in North Sweden that travels 350 kilometers in from the coast.

== Description ==
Konstvägen sju älvar goes from Umeå port in Holmsund at the Gulf of Bothnia in Västerbotten to Borgafjäll in Lapland through Umeå and Dorotea. The art route follows the E12, Swedish national road 92 and county road 1052. On its way it passes the municipalities of Umeå, Vännäs, Bjurholm, Åsele, and Dorotea. Since 1997, thirteen artworks have been erected along this road. The art route is 350 kilometers long and crosses seven rivers, namely the Ume River, the Vindel River, the Öre River, the Lögde River, Gide River, the Ångerman, and Saxälven. The art project is managed by the non-government organisation Konstvägen sju älvar with the support of the five affected municipalities.

The 13th artwork, Återkomst, by Monica L. Edmondson, was opened in 2013.

== Sculptures ==
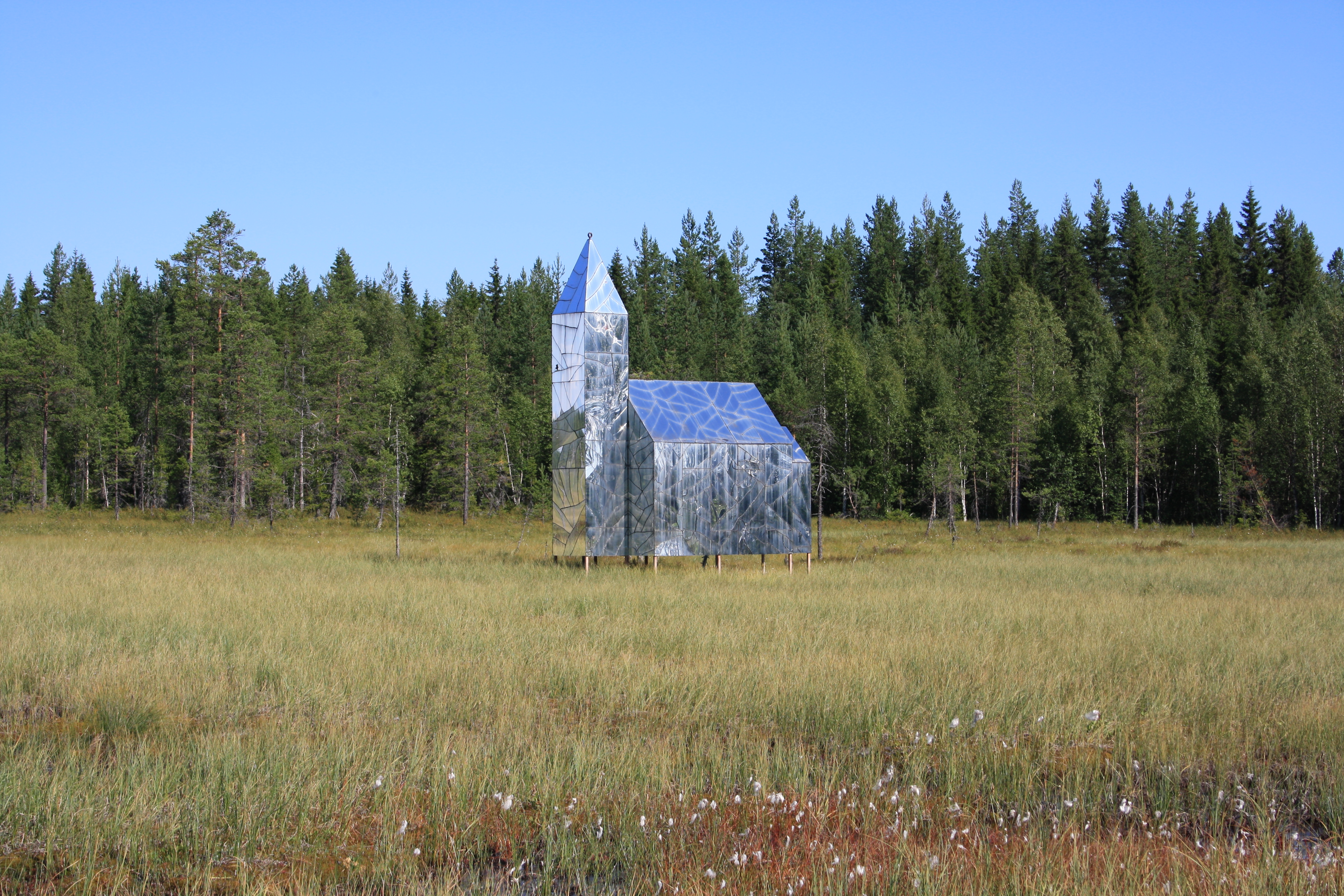
Hägring by Kent Karlsson in between Vännäs och Bjurholm in 2012

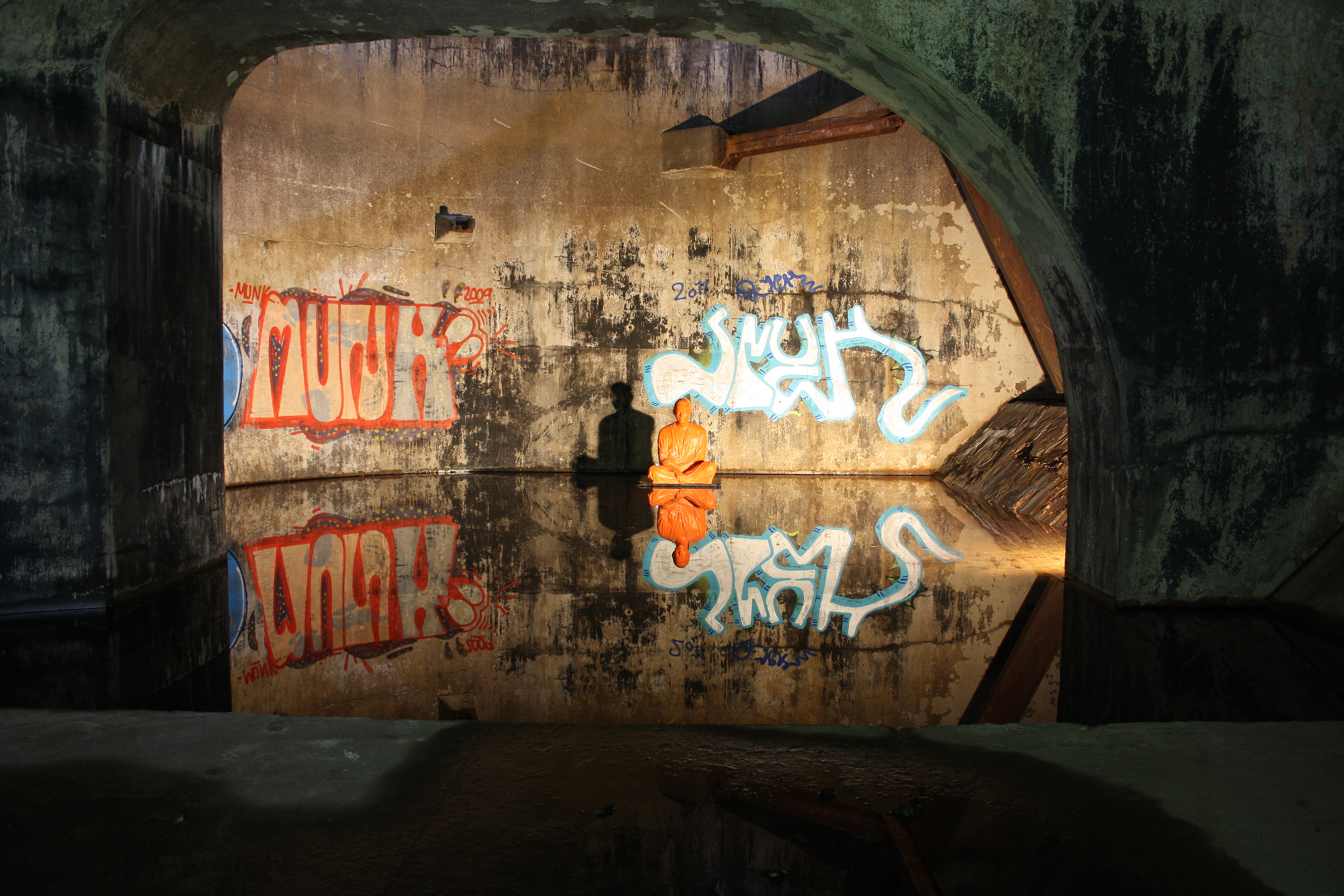
The artwork 8 11 at Baggböle in 2011

- Plats Nord 63 grader 40,8 minuter Ost 20 grader 20,6 minuter by Mats Caldeborg, galvanized steel, Port of Umeå, Holmsund(63°40′8″N 20°20′6″E)
- 8 11 by Fredrik Wretman, 1998, Baggböle (63°50′4″N 20°7′0″E)
- Eldsoffa by Ulf Rollof, brick, west of the intersection E12/Riksväg 92, at the eastern entrance to the Vännäsvägen (63°55′4″N 19°45′3″E)
- Hägring by Kent Karlsson, 1999, in between Vännäs och Bjurholm (63°55′9″N 19°31′1″E)
- Oh du härliga land by Mattias Baudin and Linda Baudin, 2011, Balsjö, 5 km west of Bjurholm
- Vägabstraktion by Jacob Dahlgren, 2011, at Lögdeälven, 23 km west of Bjurholm
- Poem för imaginär älv by Sigurdur Gudmundsson, bronze, in the reservoir Skinnmuddselet in Gideälven, 6 kilometers west of Fredrika (64°4′9″N 18°18′1″E)
- En laddad plats by Michael Richter, on a bog 7 km west of Åsele and just west of the village Hammar (64°11′0″N 17°13′3″E)
- Himmelfrid by Solfrid Mortensen, concrete, on a hill, 55 kilometers west of Dorotea and 5 kilometers west of the village of Highland (64°38′2″N 15°48′0″E)
- Nybyggarkvinnan by Anne-Karin Furunes, 2003, former summer pasture area at the village Varpsjö, 32 km west of Åsele (64°14′0″N 16°48′3″E)
- Återkallelse av Monika Larsen Dennis, marble, 2004, in Ormsjö, 30 kilometers west of Dorotea, is created in memory of the 14 log floaters who drowned in the Ormsjö accident in 1936. (64°25′0″N 16°1′0″E)
- Ljusfenomen by Olov Tällström, piles and headlights, slope at Lill-Arksjön, 62 km west of Dorotea and 1.5 kilometers west of the village Storbäck (64°38′2″N 15°48′0″E)
- Återkomst by Monica L. Edmondson, stone and glass, 2013, in Borgafjäll
