= Documenta 9 =

1992 art exhibition in Kassel, Germany

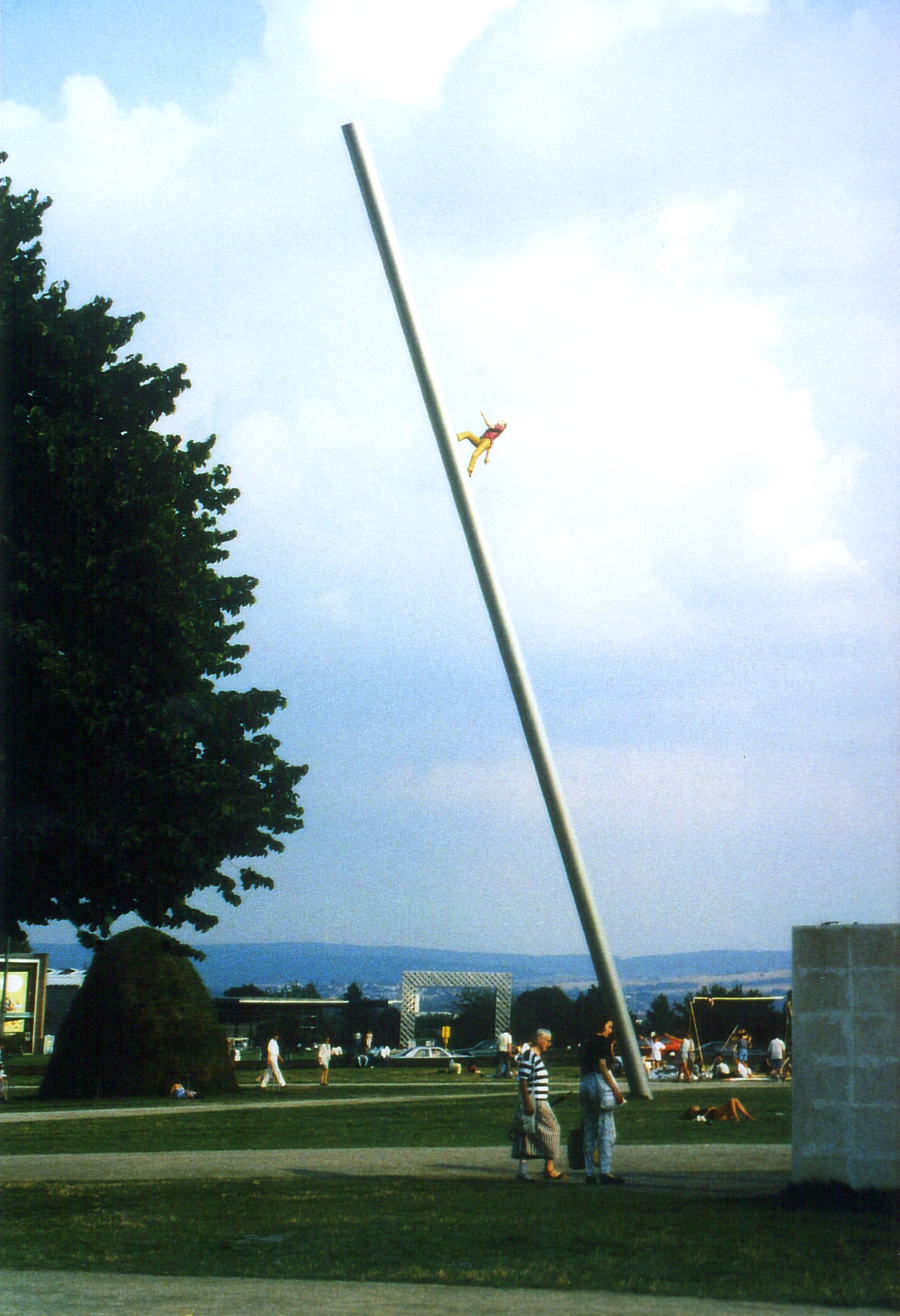
Documenta IX Jonathan Borowsky Friedrichsplatz

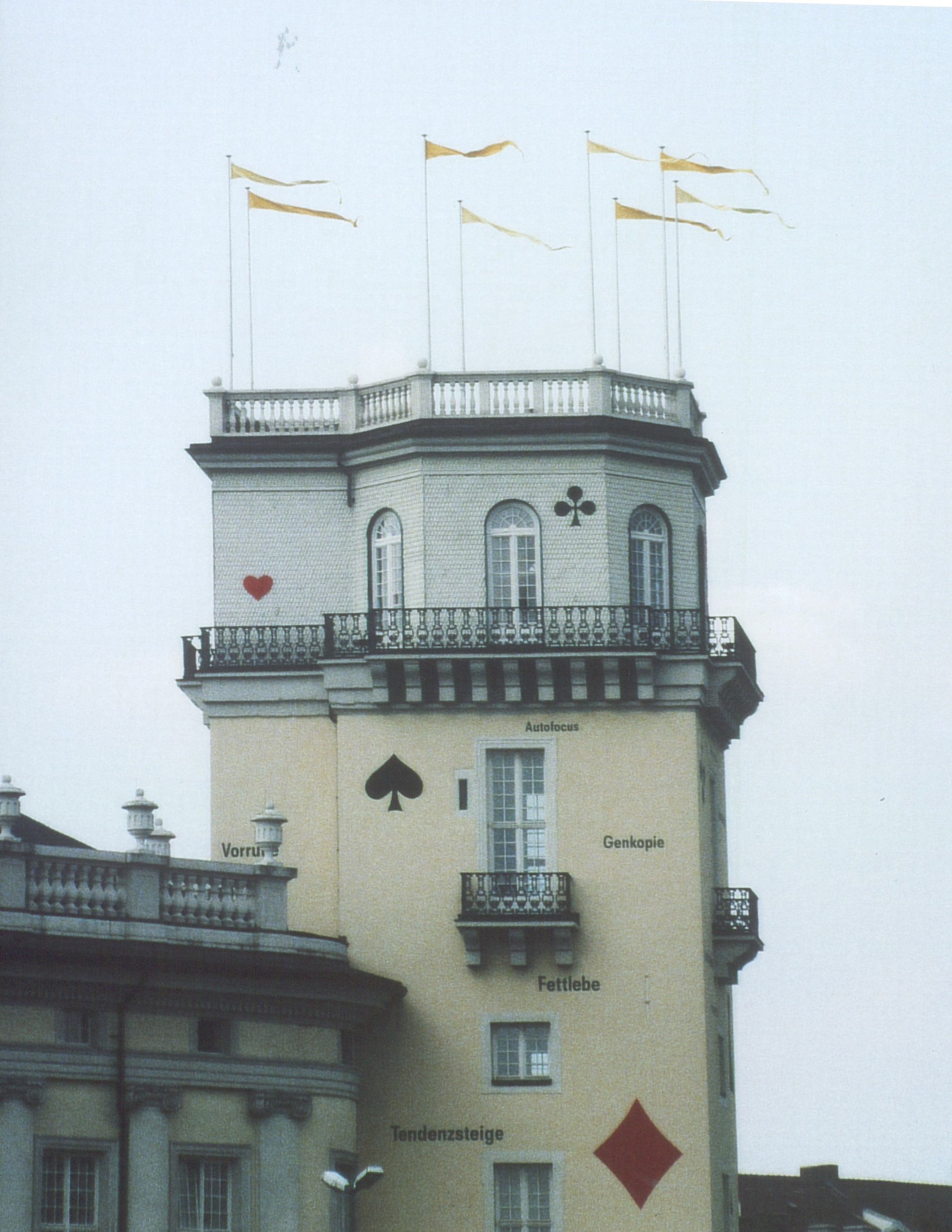
Zwehrenturm Lothar Baumgarten Documenta IX

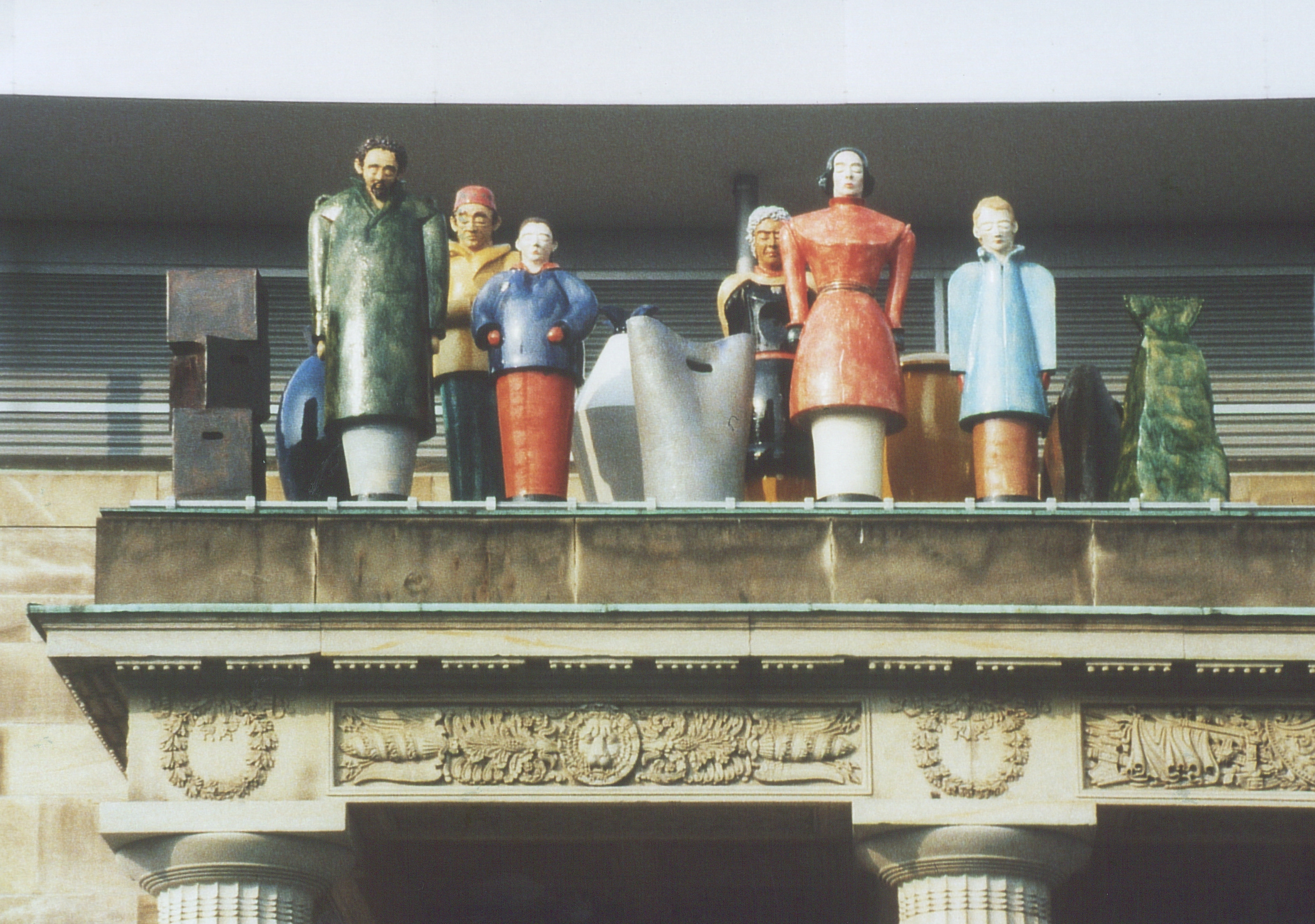
Documenta IX Thomas Schütte

DOCUMENTA IX was the ninth edition of documenta, a quinquennial contemporary art exhibition. It was held between 13 June and 20 September 1992 in Kassel, Germany. The artistic director was Jan Hoet in collaboration with Bart de Baere, Denys Zacharopoulos and Pier Luigi Tazzi.

== Participants ==
- A Marina Abramović, Absalon, Richard Artschwager
- B Francis Bacon, Marco Bagnoli, Nicos Baikas, Mirosław Bałka, Matthew Barney, Jerry Barr, Lothar Baumgarten, Jean-Pierre Bertrand, Joseph Beuys, Michael Biberstein, Guillaume Bijl, Dara Birnbaum, Jonathan Borofsky, Louise Bourgeois, Herbert Brandl, Ricardo Brey, Tony Brown, Marie José Burki, Jean-Marc Bustamante, Michael Buthe
- C Pedro Cabrita Reis, Waltércio Caldas, Pier Paolo Calzolari, Ernst Caramelle, Lawrence Carroll, Saint Clair Cemin, Tomasz Ciecierski, Tony Clark, James Coleman, Tony Conrad, Patrick Corillon
- D Horia Damian, Richard Deacon, Thierry De Cordier, Silvie Defraoui & Chérif Defraoui, Raoul De Keyser, Wim Delvoye, Braco Dimitrijević, Eugenio Dittborn, Helmut Dorner, Stan Douglas, Marlene Dumas, Jimmie Durham
- E Mo Edoga
- F Jan Fabre, Luciano Fabro, Belu-Simion Fainaru, Peter Fend, Rose Finn-Kelcey, Wolfgang Flatz, Fortuyn/O'Brien, Günther Förg, Erik A. Frandsen, Michel François, Vera Frenkel, Katsura Funakoshi
- G Isa Genzken, Gaylen Gerber, Harald Gnade, Robert Gober, Dan Graham, Rodney Graham, Angela Grauerholz, Michael Gross
- H George Hadjimichalis, David Hammons, Georg Herold, Gary Hill, Peter Hopkins, Rebecca Horn
- J Geoffrey James, Olav Christopher Jenssen, Tim Johnson, Andrej N. Joukov
- K Ilya Kabakov, Anish Kapoor, Kazuo Katase, Tadashi Kawamata, Mike Kelley, Ellsworth Kelly, Bhupen Khakhar, Per Kirkeby, Harald Klingelhöller, Kurt Kocherscheidt, Peter Kogler, Vladimír Kokolia, Joseph Kosuth, Mariusz Kruk, Guillermo Kuitca
- L Suzanne Lafont, Jonathan Lasker, Jac Leirner, Zoe Leonard, Eugène Leroy, Via Lewandowsky, Bernd Lohaus, Ingeborg Lüscher, Attila Richard Lukacs, James Lutes
- M Marcel Maeyer, Brice Marden, Cildo Meireles, Ulrich Meister, Thom Merrick, Gerhard Merz, Mario Merz, Marisa Merz, Meuser, Jürgen Meyer, Liliana Moro, Reinhard Mucha, Matt Mullican, Juan Muñoz
- N Christa Näher, Hidetoshi Nagasawa, Bruce Nauman, Max Neuhaus, Pekka Nevalainen, Nic Nicosia, Moshe Ninio, Jussi Niva, Cady Noland
- O Manuel Ocampo, Jean-Michel Othoniel, Tony Oursler
- P Panamarenko, Giulio Paolini, A. R. Penck, Michelangelo Pistoletto, Hermann Pitz, Stephen Prina, Richard Prince, Martin Puryear
- R Royden Rabinowitch, Rober Racine, Philip Rantzer, Charles Ray, Martial Raysse, readymades belong to everyone, José Resende, Gerhard Richter, Ulf Rollof, Erika Rothenberg, Susan Rothenberg, Ulrich Rückriem, Thomas Ruff, Stephan Runge, Edward Ruscha, Reiner Ruthenbeck
- S Remo Salvadori, Joe Scanlan, Eran Schaerf, Adrian Schiess, Thomas Schütte, Helmut Schweizer, Maria Serebriakova, Mariella Simoni, Susana Solano, Ousmane Sow, Ettore Spalletti, Haim Steinbach, Pat Steir, Wolfgang Strack, Thomas Struth, János Sugár
- T Yuji Takeoka, Robert Therrien, Frédéric Matys Thursz, Niele Toroni, Thanassis Totsikas, Addo Lodovico Trinci, Mitja Tušek, Luc Tuymans
- U Micha Ullman, Juan Uslé
- V Van Gogh TV, Bill Viola, Henk Visch
- W James Welling, Franz West, Rachel Whiteread, Christopher Wool
- Y KeunByung Yook
- Z Heimo Zobernig, Gilberto Zorio, Constantin Zvezdochotov
