= Björnlandet National Park =

National park in Sweden

- Björnlandets nationalpark
- IUCN category II (national park)
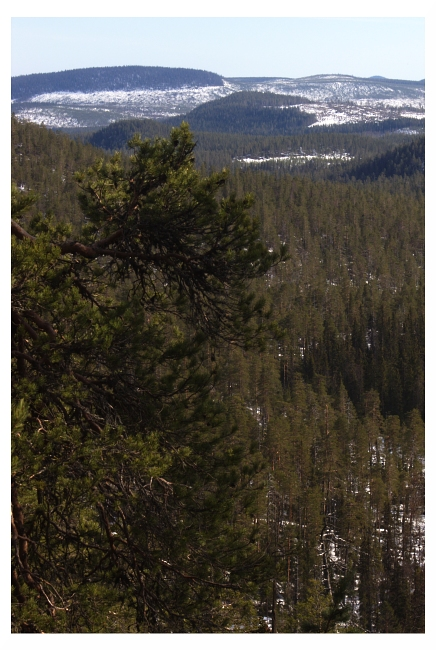
- Interactive map of Björnlandet National Park
- Location: Västerbotten County, Sweden
- Nearest city: Åsele, Umeå
- Coordinates: 63°58′N 18°01′E
- Area: 11 km^{2} (4.2 sq mi)
- Established: 1991
- Governing body: Naturvårdsverket

Björnlandet is a national park in Västerbotten County, northern Sweden. It was established in 1991 and covers an area of 11 km^{2} (4.2 mi^{2}).

Geographically it lies in southernmost Lappland, about 30 km (19 mi) southwest of the hamlet (locality) of Fredrika, in Åsele Municipality.

The park is notable for its large primeval forest and a geography that is distinguished by steep ravines and precipices. The fauna is comparatively of lower interest, due to the harsh climate and environment.

National parks of Sweden (clickable map)
