= Magdalena Andersson (Moderate) =

Swedish politician (born 1954)

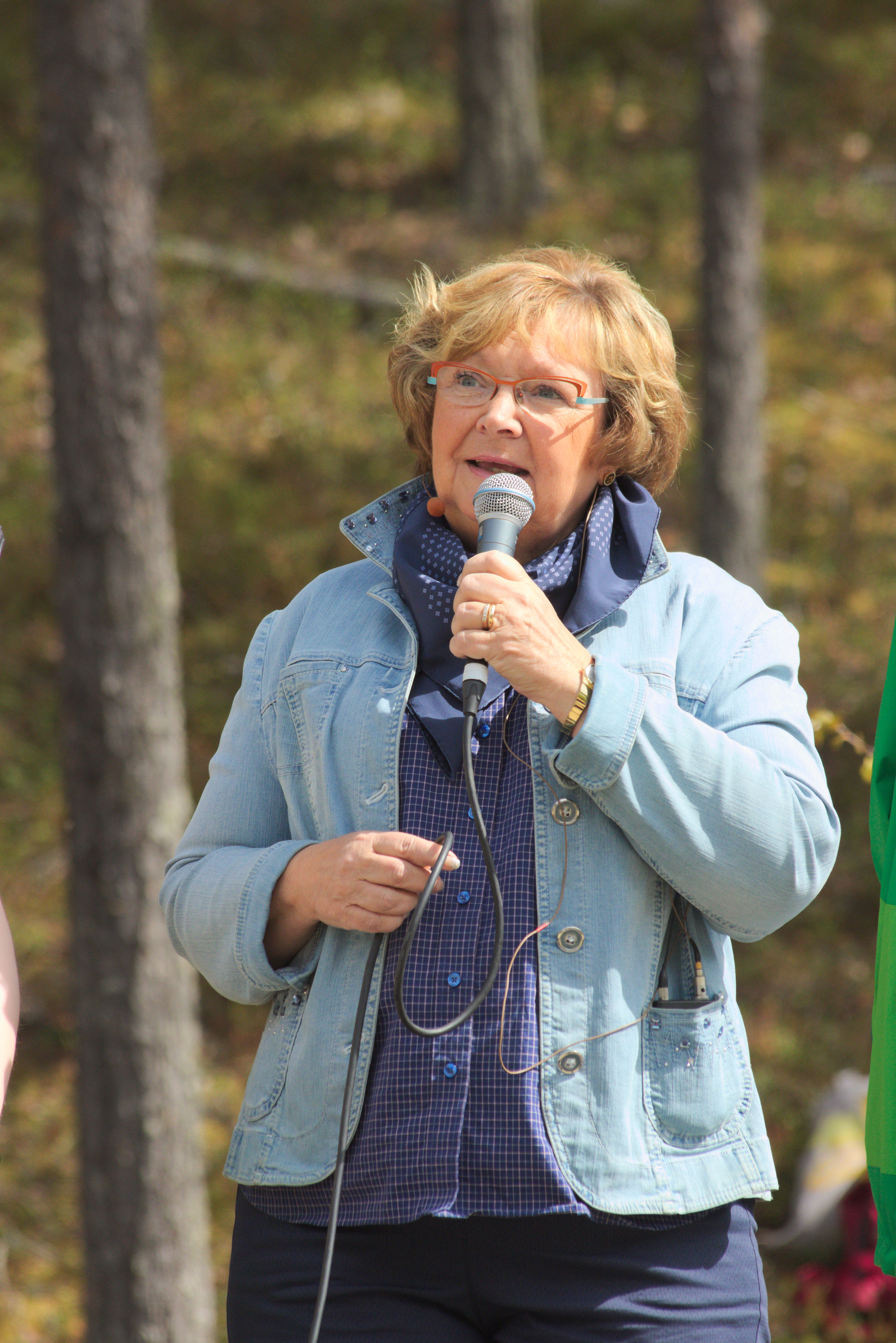
- Andersson during the inauguration of the expanded Björnlandet National Park

Governor of Västerbotten County
- In office 1 November 2012 – 31 March 2020
- Monarch: Carl XVI Gustaf
- Prime Minister: Fredrik Reinfeldt; Stefan Löfven
- Preceded by: Chris Heister
- Succeeded by: Helene Hellmark Knutsson

Member of the Riksdag
- In office 1 January 2003 – 30 October 2012
- Constituency: Jönköping County

Personal details
- Born: 9 March 1954 (age 72) Uddeholm, Värmland County, Sweden
- Party: Moderate

Winnie Ester "Magdalena" Andersson (born 9 March 1954) is a Swedish politician of the Moderate Party. She was a member of the Riksdag from 2003 until 2012, representing Jönköping County, and later governor of Västerbotten County from November 2012 to March 2020.

== Parliamentary activity ==
In the Riksdag, Andersson was a member of the social affairs committee 2004–2010 and the civil affairs committee 2010–2012. She was a member of the War Delegation 2006–2012, the Riksdag board 2008–2012 and the Riksdag election committee 2010–2012. Andersson was also a deputy in the Riksdag Board of Directors, the Labor Market Committee, the Housing Committee, the EU Committee, the Social Insurance Committee and the Social Affairs Committee, as well as a deputy in the combined Justice and Social Affairs Committee and the combined Foreign Affairs and Social Affairs Committee.

== See also ==
- List of governors of Västerbotten County
- List of members of the Swedish Riksdag

Party political offices
Preceded by Catharina Elmsäter-Svärd	Chairperson of the Moderate Women's Association; 2005–2011	Succeeded by Saila Quicklund
Civic offices
Preceded by Chris Heister	Governor of Västerbotten County; 2012–2020	Succeeded by Helene Hellmark Knutsson
