= Chris Heister =

Swedish politician (born 1950)

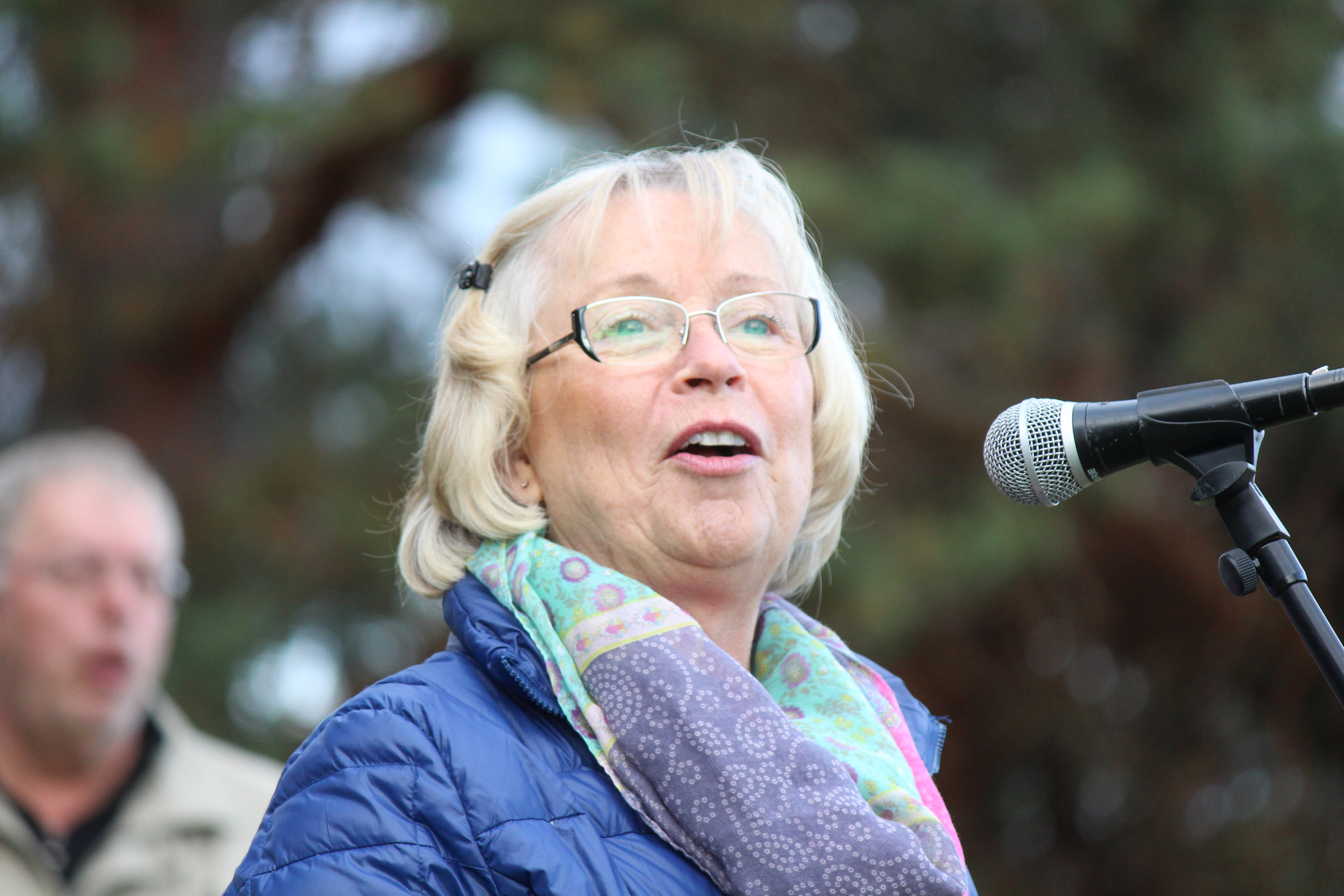

Member of Parliament
- In office 1991–2002

Governor of Västerbotten County
- In office 2008–2012

Governor of Stockholm County
- In office 2012–2017

Personal details
- Born: 18 September 1950
- Political party: Moderate Party

Chris Heister (born Gun Christina Heister; 18 September 1950, in Östhammar) is a Swedish Moderate Party politician and former Leader of the Opposition on Stockholm County Council. She was elected to the Riksdag in 1991 and served until 2002. 1999–2003 she was deputy chairman of the party. In 2002, she chose to step down from the Riksdag to pursue a career in Stockholm's local politics. Having experience as a health spokesman in the Rikdag, she is very active on health issues - the main function of Stockholm County Council.

Heister was appointed governor of Västerbotten County in 2008 and served in this capacity until 2012. From 1 February 2012 to 31 August 2017, she served as governor of Stockholm County.

Preceded by Ingela Nylund Watz	Chief Commissioner of the Stockholm County Council; 2006-2008	Succeeded by Catharina Elmsäter-Svärd
Preceded by Lorentz Andersson	Governor of Västerbotten County; 2008–2012	Succeeded by Magdalena Andersson
Preceded by Per Unckel (dead 20 September 2011); Katarina Kämpe (temporary, after Unckel's death)	Governor of Stockholm County; 2012–2017	Succeeded by Sven-Erik Österberg
