= Åsele Municipality =

Åsele Municipality Åsele kommun
- Municipality
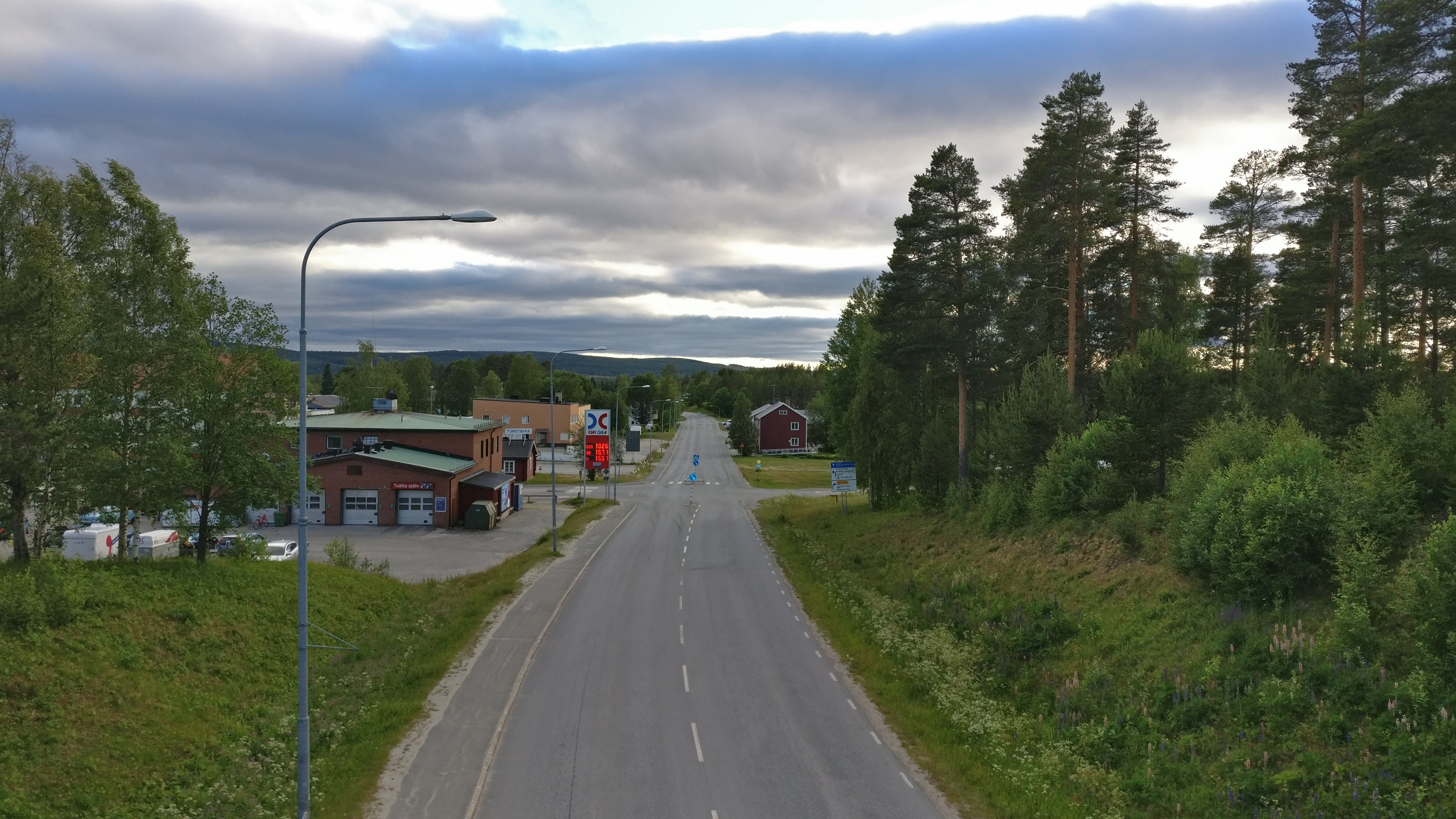

- Coat of arms

- Coordinates: 64°09′N 17°21′E
- Country: Sweden
- County: Västerbotten County
- Seat: Åsele

Area
  - Total: 4,543.95 km^{2} (1,754.43 sq mi)
  - Land: 4,223.79 km^{2} (1,630.81 sq mi)
  - Water: 320.16 km^{2} (123.61 sq mi)
- Area as of 1 January 2014.

Population (30 June 2025)
  - Total: 2,708
  - Density: 0.6411/km^{2} (1.661/sq mi)
- Time zone: UTC+1 (CET)
  - Summer (DST): UTC+2 (CEST)
- ISO 3166 code: SE
- Province: Lapland
- Municipal code: 2463
- Website: www.asele.se

Åsele Municipality (Swedish: Åsele kommun) is a municipality in Västerbotten County in northern Sweden. Its seat is located in the town of Åsele. It is located in the southernmost fringe of Lapland.

== History ==
The first Swedish settlement in Åsele Municipality (it was already inhabited by the native Sami people) was in Gafsele south of Åsele. The settlers were Nils Andersson and his wife Brita. They came from Finland in 1674, trying to avoid the war with Russia.

Fredrika is a parish in the municipality. It was created in 1799 and named in honour of Queen Frederica Dorothea Wilhelmina of Sweden. Other nearby parishes were named Dorotea and Vilhelmina, but Åsele refused to take any of these names, as they were proud of themselves and the town.

In 1974 the former market town (köping) Åsele (1959-1970) was amalgamated with Dorotea and Fredrika. In 1980 the Dorotea part was detached, forming a new Dorotea Municipality.

== Geography ==
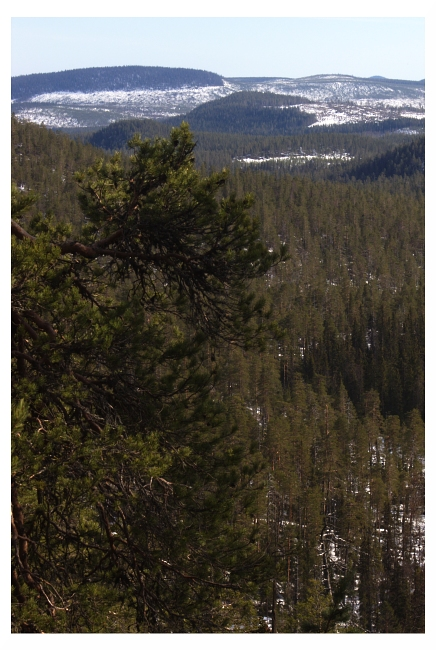
Björnlandet National Park.

Geographically, the Ångerman River flows from Vilhelmina through Åsele Municipality, and many electric power stations are built around it.

The town Åsele is located in the middle of the municipality. It has a wooden church, a small historical (open-air) museum, and a nine-hole golf course.

=== Localities ===
There are two localities (or urban areas) in Åsele Municipality:

#	Locality	Population
1	**Åsele**	1,920
2	Fredrika	254

The municipal seat in bold

== Demographics ==
This is a demographic table based on Åsele Municipality's electoral districts in the 2022 Swedish general election sourced from SVT's election platform, in turn taken from SCB official statistics.

In total there were 2,803 residents, including 2,126 Swedish citizens of voting age. 54.9% voted for the left coalition and 43.8% for the right coalition. Indicators are in percentage points except population totals and income.

Location	Residents	Citizen adults	Left vote	Right vote	Employed	Swedish parents	Foreign heritage	Income SEK	Degree
Location			%	%					
Åsele C	1,597	1,237	57.2	41.3	78	86	14	21,345	27
Åsele omland	1,206	889	53.0	45.5	82	85	15	21,368	31
Source: SVT

== Elections ==
=== Riksdag ===
These are the results of the elections to the Riksdag for Åsele Municipality since the 1972 municipal reform. SCB did not publish the party's results for the Sweden Democrats between 1988 and 1998 because of the party's small size nationally.

Year	Turnout	Votes	V	S	MP	C	L	KD	M	SD	ND
1973	89.9	6,086	3.7	51.8	0.0	24.7	12.2	2.7	4.4	0.0	0.0
1976	90.9	6,299	3.3	54.1	0.0	24.7	11.4	1.9	4.6	0.0	0.0
1979	88.7	3,380	2.9	55.9	0.0	20.5	10.5	2.7	7.4	0.0	0.0
1982	89.3	3,309	3.6	58.3	1.0	19.9	6.5	2.9	7.9	0.0	0.0
1985	88.0	3,149	4.2	56.7	1.0	21.1	8.8	0.0	8.2	0.0	0.0
1988	86.2	2,893	3.7	57.9	3.5	16.8	7.7	4.7	5.5	0.0	0.0
1991	83.2	2,708	4.8	53.7	1.3	15.5	5.9	6.9	8.3	0.0	1.3
1994	85.1	2,705	5.1	59.9	4.1	12.6	4.7	4.4	8.1	0.0	0.7
1998	81.2	2,442	11.8	50.5	2.6	10.6	3.8	8.4	9.1	0.0	0.0
2002	79.9	2,208	9.1	52.3	1.9	17.2	5.7	6.0	5.1	0.4	0.0
2006	80.7	2,070	7.0	50.6	1.1	16.3	4.8	6.5	10.0	1.6	0.0
2010	83.3	2,004	7.4	51.2	1.9	9.6	5.8	5.4	13.6	3.9	0.0
2014	84.9	1,893	9.1	44.8	1.9	10.6	5.2	3.4	11.7	10.9	0.0

Blocs

This lists the relative strength of the socialist and centre-right blocs since 1973, but parties not elected to the Riksdag are inserted as "other", including the Sweden Democrats results from 1988 to 2006, but also the Christian Democrats pre-1991 and the Greens in 1982, 1985 and 1991. The sources are identical to the table above. The coalition or government mandate marked in bold formed the government after the election. New Democracy got elected in 1991 but are still listed as "other" due to the short lifespan of the party.

Year	Turnout	Votes	Left	Right	SD	Other	Elected
1973	89.9	6,086	**55.5**	41.3	0.0	3.2	96.8
1976	90.9	6,299	57.4	**40.7**	0.0	1.9	98.1
1979	88.7	3,380	58.8	**38.4**	0.0	2.8	97.2
1982	89.3	3,309	**61.9**	34.3	0.0	4.8	95.2
1985	88.0	3,149	**60.9**	38.1	0.0	1.0	99.0
1988	86.2	2,893	**65.1**	30.0	0.0	4.9	95.1
1991	83.2	2,708	58.5	**36.6**	0.0	4.9	96.4
1994	85.1	2,705	**69.1**	29.8	0.0	1.1	98.9
1998	81.2	2,442	**64.9**	31.9	0.0	3.2	96.8
2002	79.9	2,208	**63.3**	34.0	0.0	2.7	97.3
2006	80.7	2,070	58.7	**37.6**	0.0	3.7	96.3
2010	83.3	2,004	60.5	**34.4**	3.9	1.2	98.8
2014	84.9	1,893	**55.8**	30.9	10.9	2.4	97.6

== Other ==
The municipality has recently received some recognition as the future site of Europe's largest Thai Buddhist temple.
