= Vilhelmina BK =

Association football club in Vilhelmina, Sweden

- Full name: Vilhelmina bollklubb
- Sport: soccer
- Based in: Vilhelmina, Sweden

Vilhelmina BK was a sports club in Vilhelmina, Sweden. The women's soccer team played in the Swedish top division in 1981.
