= Bastuträsk, Bjurholm Municipality =

Village in Västerbotten, Sweden

Coordinates: 64°0′50″N 19°21′10″E

Bastuträsk is a village in Bjurholm Municipality, Västerbotten, Sweden, located around 50 kilometer northwest from Umeå. There is also a nearby lake, which has the same name, Bastuträsk.

== Famous people ==
- Tomas Pleje
