= Erik Viktor Almquist =

Swedish politician

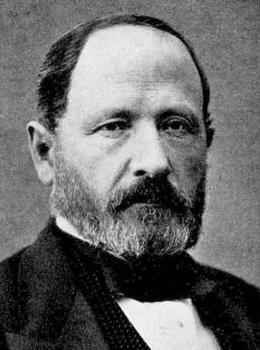
- Erik Viktor Almquist
- Born: 7 March 1817; Eds County, Uppland
- Died: 13 December 1872 (aged 55); Umeå
- Known for: Governor of Vasterbotten
- Predecessor: Gustaf Munthe
- Successor: Axel Wästfelt
- Relatives: Carl Jonas Love Almqvist

Erik Viktor Almquist (7 March 1817 – 13 December 1872) was a Swedish politician. He was governor (landshövding i.e. chieftain of the land) of the northern Swedish county of Vasterbotten. He improved Sami rights and brought forward legislation regarding forestry management.

== Life ==
Almquist was born in Antuna, Eds County, Uppland, in 1817 to Carl Gustaf Almquist and his second wife Agnes Catherine Alten. His elder half-brother was the writer Carl Jonas Love Almqvist. Almquist joined the military where he was a dedicated worker. He worked his way up through the officer core. In 1834 he was a sergeant in the Hälsinge regiment and he rose to second lieutenant before moving to the Uppland Regiment as a second major in 1862. His skills as a farmer, municipal worker and army officer were well regarded. Despite having to travel miles on foot he visited the Sami people three times.

In 1864 he was appointed the Governor of Västerbotten succeeding Gustaf Munthe. The following year he donated land in Umeå to create the park that became known as Döbelns park.

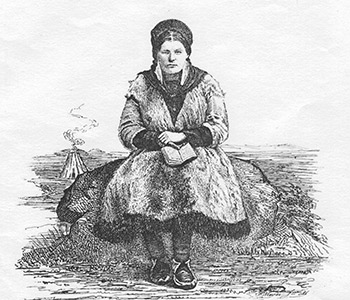
Maria Magdalena Mathsdotter as she appeared in an 1864 newspaper

In 1866 he met Maria Magdalena Mathsdotter, who contacted him via his half-brother Carl Jonas Love Almqvist. Mathsdotter had successfully petitioned the king two years earlier to improve Sami education in Lapland. She had captured the public's imagination by skiing the length of Sweden to ask a favour of the king. As a result, she had received international support for founding schools and improving education in Lapland. In 1866 she travelled south again and met Almquist. Almquist took up Mathsdotter's case and starting in 1871 the law was changed to establish better rights for the Sami people.

Almquist became a member of the Riksdag (parliament) in 1867. This was at a time of famine and a severe shortage of food in Västerbotten. He served from 1867 to 1869 in the first chamber before joining the second chamber in 1870. He introduced two bills that won approval whilst he represented Harnosand, Umeå, Luleå and Piteå. The first made the grazing rights of the Sami people clear and the other related to forest management. Whilst he was governor there were significant problems with the ownership of timber as the saw mills seized power. The methods reported at Baggböle sawmill in 1866–1867 created a scandal. A new Swedish word derived from the name of the village, baggböleri, was a derogatory term for the deforestation that had taken place in his county.

Almquist was appointed chair of a new forest committee but he died in Umeå in 1872. His job as governor was taken by Axel Wästfelt.

Preceded by Gustaf Munthe	Governor of Västerbotten County; 1864-1872	Succeeded by Axel Wästfelt
