= Döbelns Park =

Park in Umeå, Sweden

Döbelns park
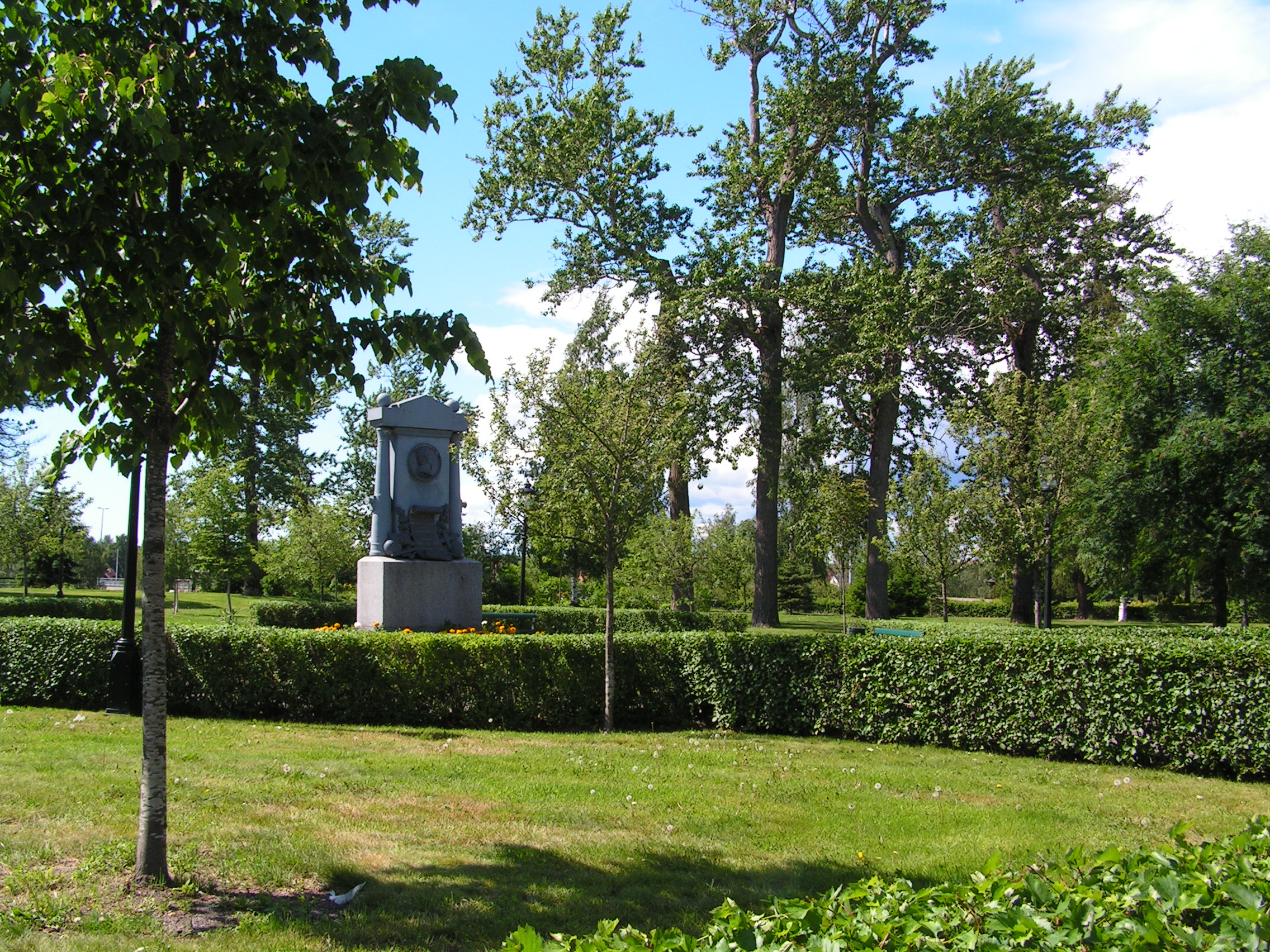
- Döbelns park with the monument.
- Interactive map of Döbelns park
- Type: Urban park
- Location: Umeå, Sweden
- Coordinates: 63°49′22″N 20°16′14″E
- Created: 1865
- Open: Open all year

Döbelns park is in central Umeå in northern Sweden. It is the oldest park in Umeå, created in 1865. It is named after the General Georg Carl von Döbeln, and his monument was placed in the park in 1867. This park should not be confused with "Döbelns plan" which is a smaller communal area elsewhere further west in the city.

== Description ==
Preparations for the park started in 1865 and the plans were for an English-style garden on the south side of the Ume River. The land was donated by the recently appointed Governor of Västerbotten Erik Viktor Almquist to create a common space for the town's residents. Winding gravel paths, arbours, viewpoints and flower beds were created. The park was placed between the streets of Östra Kyrkogatan, Storgatan and Östra Strandgatan.

The park was named as Stadsträdgården, but after the Döbeln monument was unveiled in 1867, the park was popularly known as Döbelns Park. In 1888 the Umeå city fire destroyed or damaged most of the park's shrubs and trees. The Döbeln monument was not damaged and in 1897 a major restoration project was started to restore the park.
