= Bjurholm =

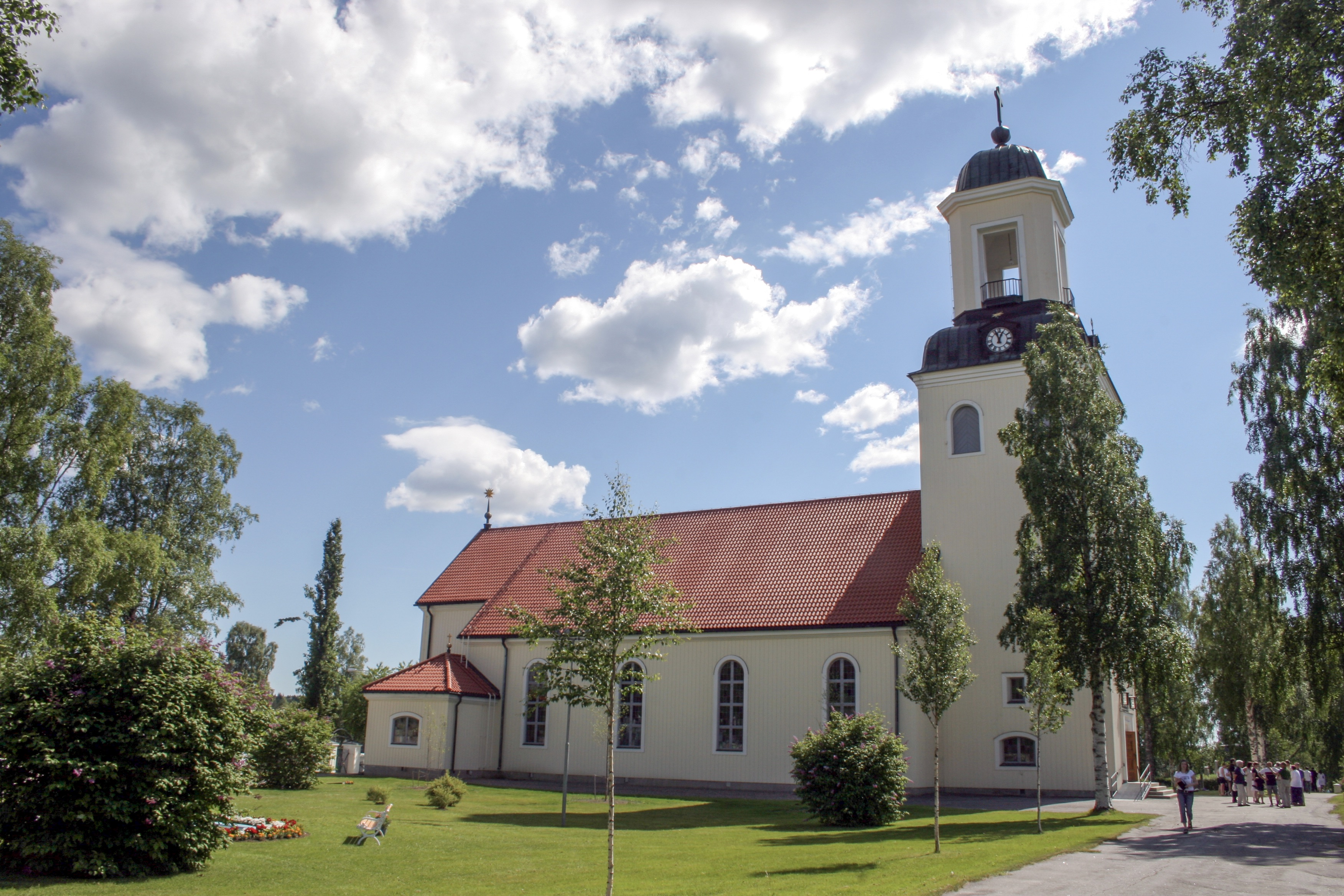
- Bjurholm Church

- Location within Västerbotten Location within Sweden
- Coordinates: 63°55′49″N 19°12′49″E
- Country: Sweden
- Province: Ångermanland
- County: Västerbotten County
- Municipality: Bjurholm Municipality

Area
  - Total: 1.72 km^{2} (0.66 sq mi)

Population (31 December 2010)
  - Total: 968
  - Density: 564/km^{2} (1,460/sq mi)
- Time zone: UTC+1 (CET)
  - Summer (DST): UTC+2 (CEST)

Bjurholm is a locality and seat of Bjurholm Municipality in Västerbotten County, Sweden with 968 inhabitants in 2010. It is the second smallest municipal seat in Sweden (Österbymo is smaller) and the seat of the second to least populated municipality in the country. A tourist attraction in the region is Älgens Hus (The Elk house). There is a tame elk and education about elks.

There had been an earlier simple wooden church built at the start of the nineteenth century. The existing church is higher than the main town and it dates from 1932 when the second church, that had been built in 1875, burnt down. The existing church includes a chandelier from the older church and its more recent bells included some alloy from the bells lost to the fire.
