= Nicos Baikas =

Greek artist

Nicos Baikas (born in Piraeus, 1948) is a Greek artist who lives and works in Athens. He started his art studies in 1967 at the Athens School of Fine Arts and later studied at the Accademia di Belle Arti in Florence. He started exhibiting his works in the 1980s and achieved some notability in Germany after his participation in the Documenta 9 art exhibition, in 1992. His work is a synthesis of words and images, usually performed with pencil on paper in black and white.

== Selected personal exhibitions ==
- 2001 Basilica of Saint Mark Iraklion, Crete
- 1994 Centre d’ Art Contemporain, Geneva

== Selected group exhibitions ==
- 2016 Athens, EMST National Museum of Contemporary Art, "Urgent Conversations, Athens- Antwerp"
- 2010 Herford, Museum MARTa Herford, I Really Don’t Know What Art Is: Insights into a Private Collection
- 2003 Rome, MAXXI (Museo nazionale delle arti del XXI secolo), Le collezioni: acquisizioni di arte contemporanea
- 2002 Kassel, Neue Galerie, Staatliche Museen Kassel, Documenta-Erwerbungen für die Neue Galerie.
- 1993 Ghent, S.M.A.K. Museum of Contemporary Art, In Extenso / acquisitions 1989-1992
- Antwerp, Antwerp Cultural Capital, Europese Ontmoetingen
- 1992 Kassel, Documenta IX
- Ghent, S.M.A.K. Museum of Contemporary Art, Edition – Documenta IX
- Aalst Belfort, Cultural Centre De Werf, Belfry, Stedelijk Museum, Papier Beeld & Basis
- 1991 Paris, Fondation Cartier pour l'Art Contemporain, Lignes de mire 2
- 1990 Paris, Fondation Cartier pour l'Art Contemporain, Carnet de Voyages
- 1989 Athens, Deste Foundation, Psychological Abstraction
- Deurle, Museum Dhondt-Dhaenens, Europese Raaklijnen
- 1986 Brussels, Palais des Beaux Arts, Au coeur du Maelström
- 1984 Thessaloniki, Municipal Art Gallery (Thessaloniki), 5 Greek Artists
- 1981 Brussels, Palais des Beaux Arts, Art International d'Aujourd'hui, J.P. 3

== Selected bibliography ==
- Jan Hoet: "Nicos Baikas" in catalogue "Art International d'Aujourd' hui" J.P.3 Palais des Beaux Arts, Brussels, 1981.
- Catalogue of the collection, Museum of Contemporary Art. S.M.A.K., Gent, 1982.
- "Au coeur du Maelström", catalogue, Palais des Beaux Arts, Brussels, 1986.
- Benoit Angelet: "Interview with Nicos Baikas", Artefactum 17/1987, Antwerp.
- Mario Diacono: "The obscure light of exactitude", text in one-man show, Mario Diacono Gallery, Boston,1987.
- Catalogue of the collection, Museum of Contemporary Art, S.M.A.K., Ghent, 1988.
- Bart de Baere: "Nicos Baikas, a conversation on pencil, light and darkness", interview, De Gentenaar 24-3-1989, Ghent.
- Luck Lambrecht: "Nicos Baikas" in catalogue "Europese Raaklijnen", Museum Dhondt-Dhaenens, Deurle, 1989.
- "Psychological Abstraction”, catalogue, Deste foundation, Athens, 1989
- Ezio Quarantelli: "Nicos Baikas", text and interview, Contemporanea 17/1990, Turin.
- Anastasia Manos: Interview with N. Baikas in catalogue "Carnet de Voyages", Fondation Cartier pour l'Art Contemporain, Paris, 1990.
- Jean de Loisy, entretien avec Oscarine Bosquet, "Sur les pas d’un checheur d'Art", Beaux Arts, 86/1991, Paris.
- Texts by N. Baikas and interview by A. Manos, Arti 5/summer 1991, Athens.
- Documenta IX. Catalogue, Kassel 1992.
- "Documenta als Motor", Kunstforum International 119/summer 1992, Cologne.
- "Papier Beeld & Basis", catalogue, Belfort, Aalst, 1992.
- "Nicos Baikas", catalogue of Centre d' Art Contemporain de Geneva, 1994.
- Paolo Colombo: "A few thoughts on Baikas" Arti19/ March –April 1994, Athens.
- C. Cafopoulos : "Nicos Baikas" in Artforum, March 1996.
- Gianni Romano: "Bloom: Contemporary Art Garden", catalogue, Gotham editions, Milan, 1999.
- "Nicos Baikas", catalogue of the exhibition at the Basilica of St. Mark, texts by D. Davvetas & N. Baikas, Iraklion Crete, 2001.
- Marianne Heinz: Documenta-Erwerbungen für die Neue Galerie. Catalogue, Staatliche Museen Kassel, 2002.
- "Le Collezioni 1985-2008", catalogue, Galleria Nazionale d’Arte Moderna & MAXXI, Mondatori Electa Editions, Rome, 2009.
- "Ich weiß gar nicht, was Kunst ist", catalogue, MARTa Herford, Herford, 2010
