= Vilhelmina =

Vilhelmina Vualtjere
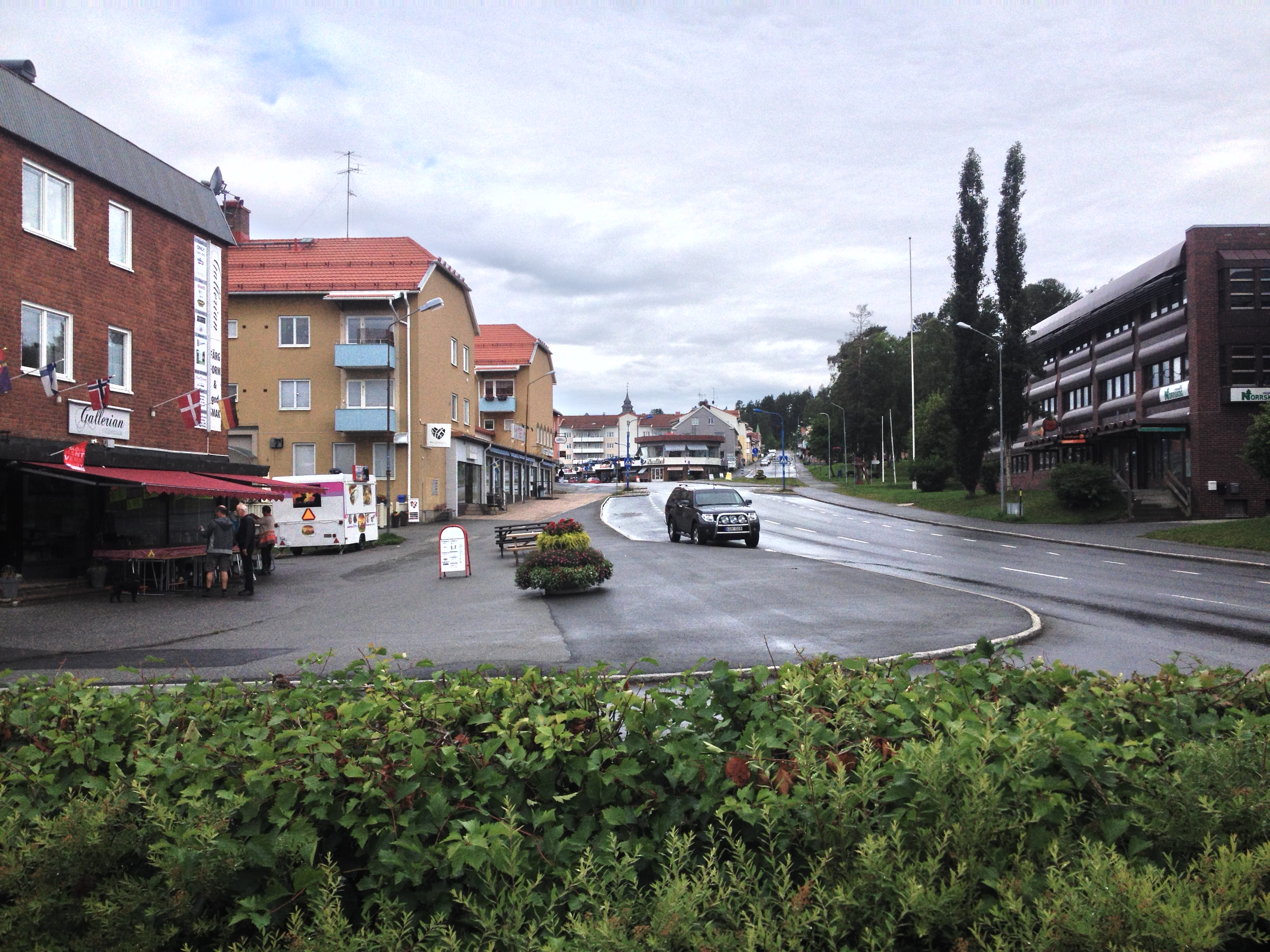
- Vilhelmina's town centre

- Location within Västerbotten Location within Sweden
- Coordinates: 64°37′N 16°39′E
- Country: Sweden
- Province: Lapland
- County: Västerbotten County
- Municipality: Vilhelmina Municipality

Area
  - Total: 3.54 km^{2} (1.37 sq mi)

Population (31 December 2010)
  - Total: 3,657
  - Density: 1,033/km^{2} (2,680/sq mi)
- Time zone: UTC+1 (CET)
  - Summer (DST): UTC+2 (CEST)
- Postal code: 8376
- Website: www.vilhelmina.se

Vilhelmina (Southern Sami: Vualtjere) is a locality and the central town of Vilhelmina Municipality in Västerbotten County, in the province of Lapland, Sweden with 3,657 inhabitants in 2010. Vilhelmina is situated by Lake Volgsjön in the Ångerman River, with the smaller Lake Baksjön located to the east of the community. Vilhelmina Church and Volgsjö School are located in Vilhelmina.

== History ==
The town of Vilhelmina originated from the settlement Volgsjö, which was established in the 1770s by Daniel Danielsson from Torvsjö within Åsele parish. Permission for the settlement was granted on 7 October 1776. Shortly thereafter, the residents of the area requested to have a chapel church with a permanent preacher, as the church in Åsele was too far away. Daniel Danielsson's homestead was deemed suitable as a residence for the preacher. Danielsson was offered to take over half of the Torvsele settlement in Åsele, which was held by the pastor and schoolmaster there, an offer he accepted. Daniel Danielsson moved, and in the summer of 1782, work began on building the chapel in Volgsjö.

In 1804, Volgsjö was renamed Vilhelmina after Queen Frederica Dorothea Wilhelmina, the consort of King Gustav IV Adolf. The parishes Fredrika and Dorotea were also named after her first names.

Vilhelmina village became a church town in 1916, but in 1921 a serious fire ravaged the area, destroying more than half of the church town. The fire started on the morning of 5 September 1921 in one of the cottages south of Storgatan. The flames quickly caught hold of the old timber walls and spread rapidly from house to house. The fire was further accelerated by the fact that people were throwing furniture, household items, and other objects out of the houses, which then caught fire and helped spread the flames. In the battle against this inferno, only three small fire pumps were available. By five in the afternoon, it was determined that over 50 buildings south of Storgatan had burned to the ground. The investigation concluded that the fire was caused by a defective chimney wall.

The remaining church cottages on the north side of Storgatan began to deteriorate, and something needed to be done to preserve these culturally and historically valuable buildings for future generations. Therefore, in the 1960s, Vilhelmina Municipality started purchasing the old houses to initiate a restoration, which was completed in 1975. These buildings, which had previously served only as private residences and business premises, were now also used for room rentals to provide temporary accommodation The church town, along with the adjacent church and buildings, is of national interest for cultural heritage conservation.

=== Administrative Affiliations ===
Vilhelmina has historically been and continues to be the parish village in Vilhelmina Parish. Following the municipal reform of 1862, it became part of Vilhelmina rural municipality, where the Vilhelmina municipal community was established on 23 March 1917. In 1947, Vilhelmina and its surrounding areas were separated from the rural municipality to form Vilhelmina market town (köping), which incorporated Vilhelmina rural municipality in 1965. In 1971, the market town was merged into Vilhelmina Municipality, where Vilhelmina has since served as the central locality.

In ecclesiastical terms, the town has been part of Vilhelmina Parish since 26 April 1783, and was part of Åsele Parish before that. The town was part of the Åsele Lapland Judicial District until 1922, then Vilhelmina Judicial District until 1948, and subsequently the Åsele and Vilhelmina Judicial District until 1971. Since 1971, Vilhelmina has been included in the Lycksele District Court's jurisdiction.

== Climate ==
Vilhelmina has a subarctic climate that is less severe than typical for a far inland locality at this latitude, but still very cold by Swedish standards. Its higher altitude causes summers to be cooler than coastal areas like Skellefteå further east, whereas winters are somewhat tempered by maritime air from the greater Atlantic and the North Atlantic Current.

Climate data for Vilhelmina (2002–2022 averages); extremes since 1995
Month	Jan	Feb	Mar	Apr	May	Jun	Jul	Aug	Sep	Oct	Nov	Dec	Year
Record high °C (°F)	7.1 (44.8)	6.8 (44.2)	12.2 (54.0)	18.6 (65.5)	26.6 (79.9)	30.3 (86.5)	31.2 (88.2)	29.2 (84.6)	24.4 (75.9)	20.2 (68.4)	11.6 (52.9)	8.1 (46.6)	31.2 (88.2)
Mean maximum °C (°F)	2.8 (37.0)	3.7 (38.7)	7.1 (44.8)	13.9 (57.0)	22.0 (71.6)	25.4 (77.7)	27.0 (80.6)	24.6 (76.3)	18.8 (65.8)	12.5 (54.5)	6.3 (43.3)	3.9 (39.0)	28.0 (82.4)
Mean daily maximum °C (°F)	−6.5 (20.3)	−4.6 (23.7)	0.5 (32.9)	6.0 (42.8)	12.5 (54.5)	17.6 (63.7)	20.4 (68.7)	18.0 (64.4)	12.3 (54.1)	5.0 (41.0)	−1.0 (30.2)	−4.3 (24.3)	6.3 (43.4)
Daily mean °C (°F)	−11.3 (11.7)	−10.0 (14.0)	−5.3 (22.5)	0.7 (33.3)	6.6 (43.9)	11.7 (53.1)	14.5 (58.1)	12.4 (54.3)	7.6 (45.7)	1.2 (34.2)	−4.5 (23.9)	−8.6 (16.5)	1.2 (34.3)
Mean daily minimum °C (°F)	−16.0 (3.2)	−15.3 (4.5)	−11.1 (12.0)	−4.6 (23.7)	0.7 (33.3)	5.7 (42.3)	8.5 (47.3)	6.7 (44.1)	2.9 (37.2)	−2.6 (27.3)	−7.9 (17.8)	−12.9 (8.8)	−3.8 (25.1)
Mean minimum °C (°F)	−32.2 (−26.0)	−31.1 (−24.0)	−26.2 (−15.2)	−14.9 (5.2)	−6.5 (20.3)	−1.4 (29.5)	0.9 (33.6)	−1.1 (30.0)	−4.6 (23.7)	−14.9 (5.2)	−21.7 (−7.1)	−27.9 (−18.2)	−34.8 (−30.6)
Record low °C (°F)	−41.1 (−42.0)	−40.2 (−40.4)	−34.6 (−30.3)	−24.9 (−12.8)	−9.1 (15.6)	−3.7 (25.3)	−0.6 (30.9)	−3.1 (26.4)	−10.3 (13.5)	−21.0 (−5.8)	−29.9 (−21.8)	−38.0 (−36.4)	−41.1 (−42.0)
Average precipitation mm (inches)	31.4 (1.24)	25.4 (1.00)	22.6 (0.89)	23.7 (0.93)	44.1 (1.74)	51.6 (2.03)	79.5 (3.13)	69.9 (2.75)	56.4 (2.22)	48.7 (1.92)	37.9 (1.49)	33.3 (1.31)	524.5 (20.65)
Source 1: SMHI Open Data
Source 2: SMHI Monthly Data 2002–2022
