= Dorotea =

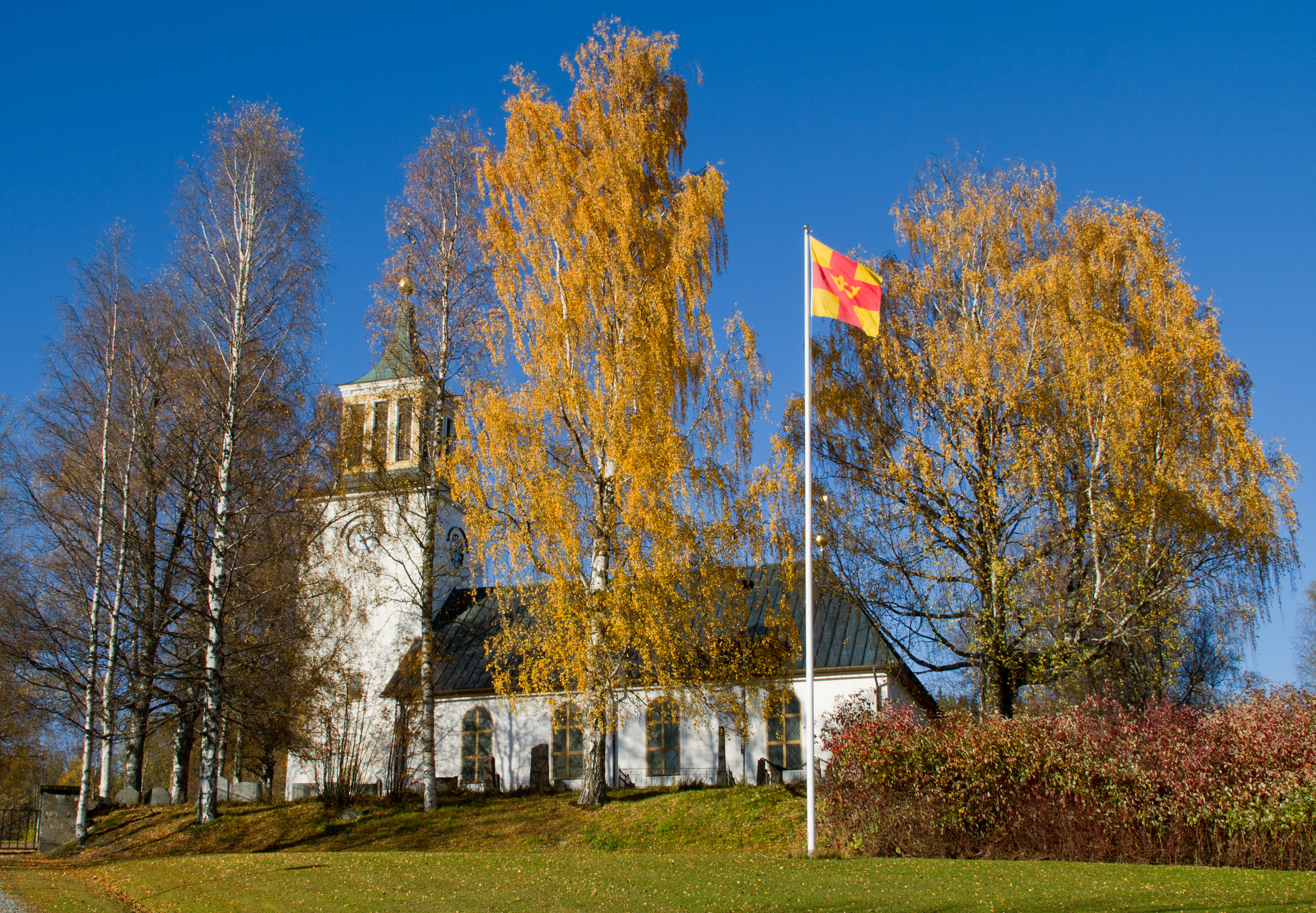
- The new Dorotea Church, opened in 1934, seen from south-east
- Nickname: Lapplands sydport (Southern gate of Lapland)
- Location within Västerbotten Location within Sweden
- Coordinates: 64°16′N 16°25′E
- Country: Sweden
- Province: Lapland
- County: Västerbotten County
- Municipality: Dorotea Municipality

Area
  - Total: 2.34 km^{2} (0.90 sq mi)

Population (31 December 2010)
  - Total: 1,543
  - Density: 660/km^{2} (1,700/sq mi)
- Time zone: UTC+1 (CET)
  - Summer (DST): UTC+2 (CEST)
- Website: www.dorotea.se

Dorotea (Southern Sami: Kraapohke) is a locality and the seat of Dorotea Municipality in Västerbotten County, province of Lapland, Sweden, with 1,543 inhabitants in 2010. European route E45 and the Inland Line both pass through Dorotea.

== History ==
Dorotea has been populated since 1713, when the first settler Jon Erson Kervalainen and his wife moved to a Sami camp later known as Svanavatten ("Swan water"). This village expanded to 41 houses by the end of the century, and the residents were anxious to build a chapel. The seat was chosen to be Bergvattnet.

On May 21, 1799, the village of Bergvattnet was renamed Dorotea, in honour of Queen Frederica Dorothea Wilhelmina of Sweden.

The church burnt down in 1932 and a new church was inaugurated in 1934. Designed by Evert Milles, it houses some notable objects, such as a sculpture by his brother the famous Carl Milles.
