= Maria Serebriakova =

Russian artist (born 1965)

Maria Serebriakova (born 1965) is a Russian artist, who lives and works in Berlin, Germany.

== Life and work ==
Maria Serebriakova was born in Moscow.

Her work mainly consists of installations, graphics, objects and photographs, which express loneliness and despair. It has been shown in Documenta IX in 1992, and in 2007 in the second Moscow Biennale, Moscow.

Although Maria Serebriakova refuses to describe her oeuvre as conceptual, she deals with the intrinsic and ontological problems of art. She envisages art as a communicative structure, able to surpass the restrictions of language. Following Wittgenstein, she sees art competent to express what one cannot describe with words.

The objects, installations, graphics and photographs of Serebriakova are linked to the artist's personal vision of existence. Serebriakova brings her investigated subject matter of human tragedy of emptiness and loneliness, misunderstandings and cruelty to a universal and philosophical level. She uses different means of expression depending on the problems touched upon, but her work always gives off gentle human warmth. The artist achieves this effect by offering a gesture that appeals to the most deeply hidden feelings of the viewer. Serebriakova searches for her own identity, for general understanding and response, and for a lost trace of humankind.

Serebriakova has works in the Museum of Modern Art.
