= Fredrika, Sweden =

Fredrika
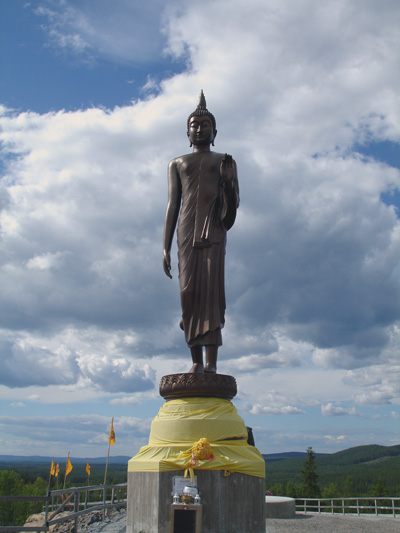
- Statue at the buddhist temple construction site in Fredrika

- Location within Västerbotten Location within Sweden
- Coordinates: 64°05′N 18°24′E
- Country: Sweden
- Province: Lapland
- County: Västerbotten County
- Municipality: Åsele Municipality

Area
  - Total: 1.17 km^{2} (0.45 sq mi)

Population (31 December 2010)
  - Total: 215
  - Density: 184/km^{2} (480/sq mi)
- Time zone: UTC+1 (CET)
  - Summer (DST): UTC+2 (CEST)

Fredrika is a locality situated in Åsele Municipality, Västerbotten County, Sweden with 215 inhabitants in 2010.

== Buddharama Temple ==
In 2004 it was decided that a Buddhist temple was to be built near Fredrika. As of 2011 the construction is still ongoing.
