= Thom Merrick =

American contemporary artist

- Born: 1963 (age 62–63); Sacramento, California
- Education: San Francisco Art Institute
- Known for: Painting, Sculpture

Thom Merrick (born 1963) is an American contemporary artist.

== Early life and education ==
Merrick was born in Sacramento, California in 1963. He attended the San Francisco Art Institute.

== Career ==
Merrick is known for creating with industrial materials and simplified forms, or whatever material was on hand. From the late 1980s to the late 1990s, he created his works on-site, in situ, in the exhibition hall. These works aim to break down the boundary of artistic identity, production, and requisite classifications.

He became known during the 1980s and was represented by pioneer gallerists Colin de Land (b. 1955–2003) and Pat Hearn (b. 1955 – d. 2000) in New York City. He exhibited throughout Europe, represented by the minimalist art dealer and collector Rolf Ricke, in Cologne, and by the conceptual, Galerie Susanna Kulli, in St. Gallen, among others.

In 1998 he exhibited at MoMA PS1 in the exhibition Construction drawings.

His work is included in the collections of the Museum für Moderne Kunst, Frankfurt, and the Kunstmuseum Liechtenstein.

== Catalogues ==
- "Documenta 9", Kassel, Edition Cantz, 1992
- "Nur 72 Stunden", Die Wandelhalle, Forum für Kunst, Köln, 1992
- "Im Rahmen der Ausstellung – Künstlergespräch mit Thom Merrick", engl., Edition Galerie Susanna Kulli, St.Gallen, 1996
- "Donald Baechler, Matthew McCaslin, Rachel Khedoori, Thom Merrick, Martin Puryear, Kathleen Schimert, Hanne Tierney, Jason Rhoades", Stiftelsen Wanas Utställningar, Wanas Foundation, Knislinge, 1996
- "Stilleben – Nature morte – Natura morta – Still life" Carte Blanche von Adrian Schiess, Helmhaus, Zürich, 1997
- "Thom Merrick", Interventionen 8, Sprengel Museum Hannover, 1997
- "504", ein Ausstellungsprojekt der Klasse John M Armleder, Hochschule für Bildende Künste, Braunschweig, 1997
- "I love New York", Crossover der aktuellen Kunst, Museum Ludwig, Köln, Verlag DuMont, 1999
- "Transfert: Kunst Im Urbanen Raum" Art dans l’espace Urban, Biel, 2000
- "Le Fou dedoube / The Split Personality Madman" Château d’Oiron, France, La Société des collectionneurs d’Art Contemporain, Moscow, 2000
- 2005 Yves Aupetitallot, Private View 1980–2000: Collection Pierre Huber, JRP/Ringier
