= Dorotea Municipality =

Dorotea Municipality Dorotea kommun
- Municipality
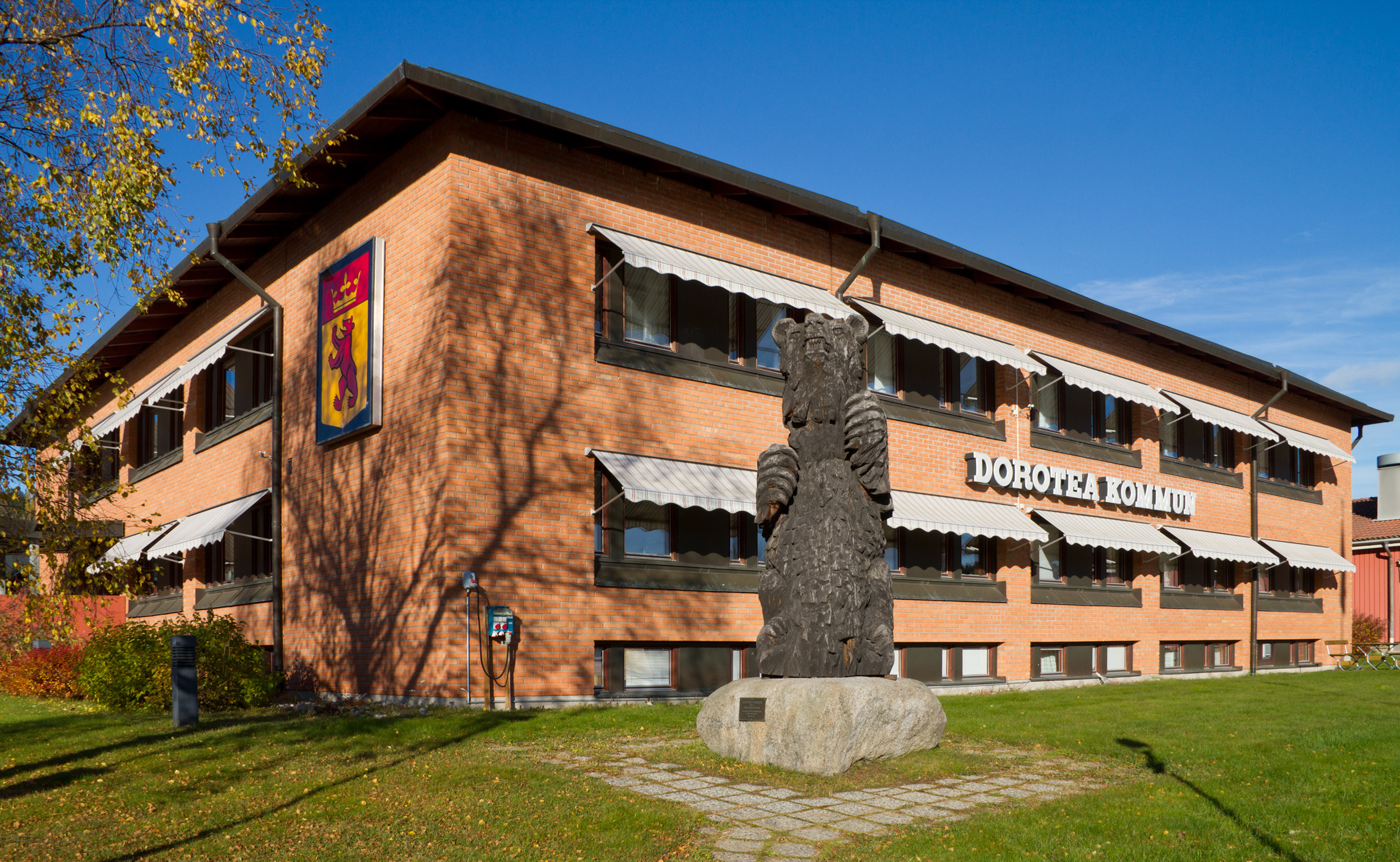
- Dorotea municipal building

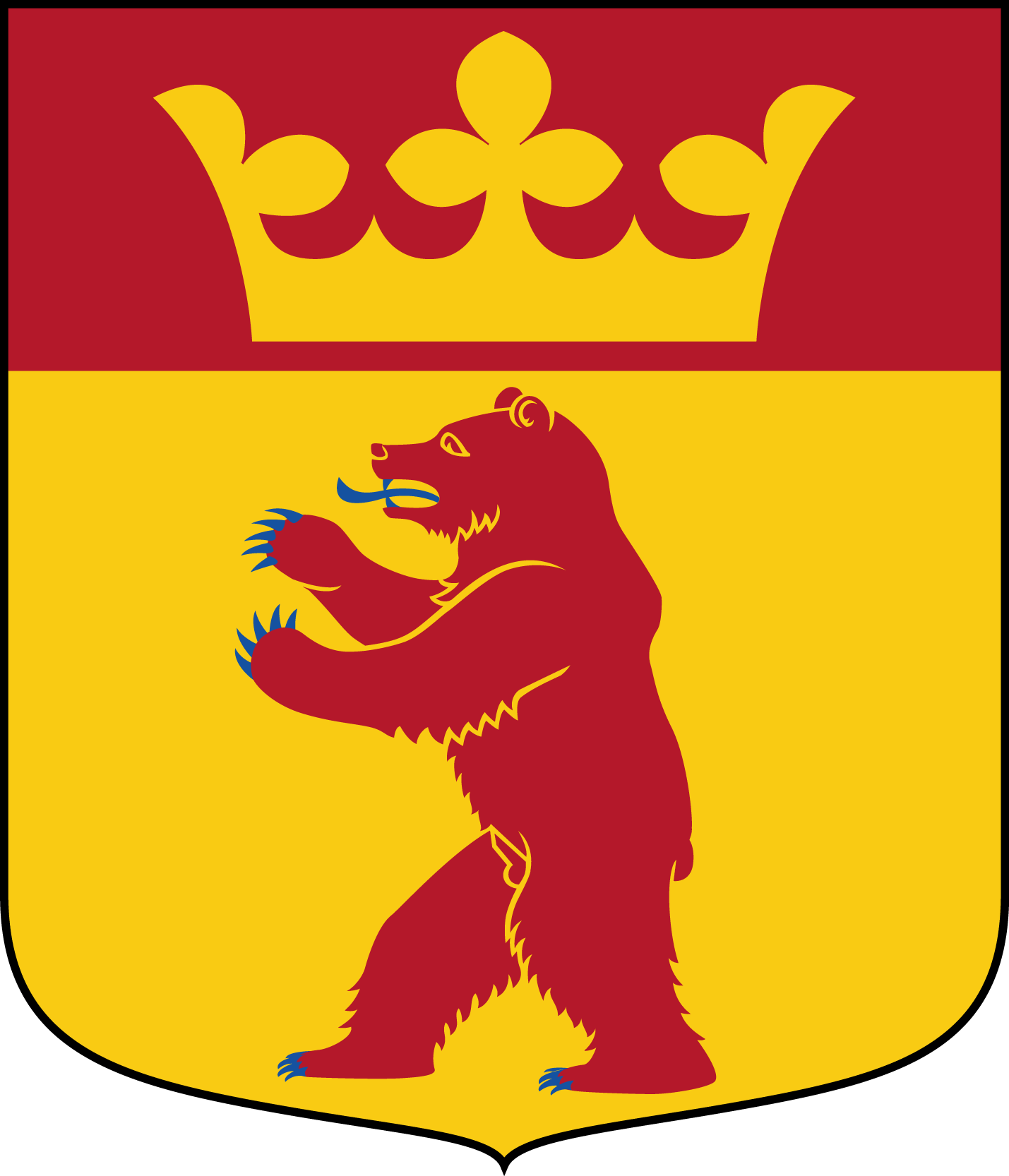
- Coat of arms

- Coordinates: 64°16′N 16°25′E
- Country: Sweden
- County: Västerbotten County
- Seat: Dorotea

Area
  - Total: 2,939.9 km^{2} (1,135.1 sq mi)
  - Land: 2,764.92 km^{2} (1,067.54 sq mi)
  - Water: 174.98 km^{2} (67.56 sq mi)
- Area as of 1 January 2014.

Population (30 June 2025)
  - Total: 2,288
  - Density: 0.8275/km^{2} (2.143/sq mi)
- Time zone: UTC+1 (CET)
  - Summer (DST): UTC+2 (CEST)
- ISO 3166 code: SE
- Province: Lapland, Ångermanland and Jämtland
- Municipal code: 2425
- Website: www.dorotea.se

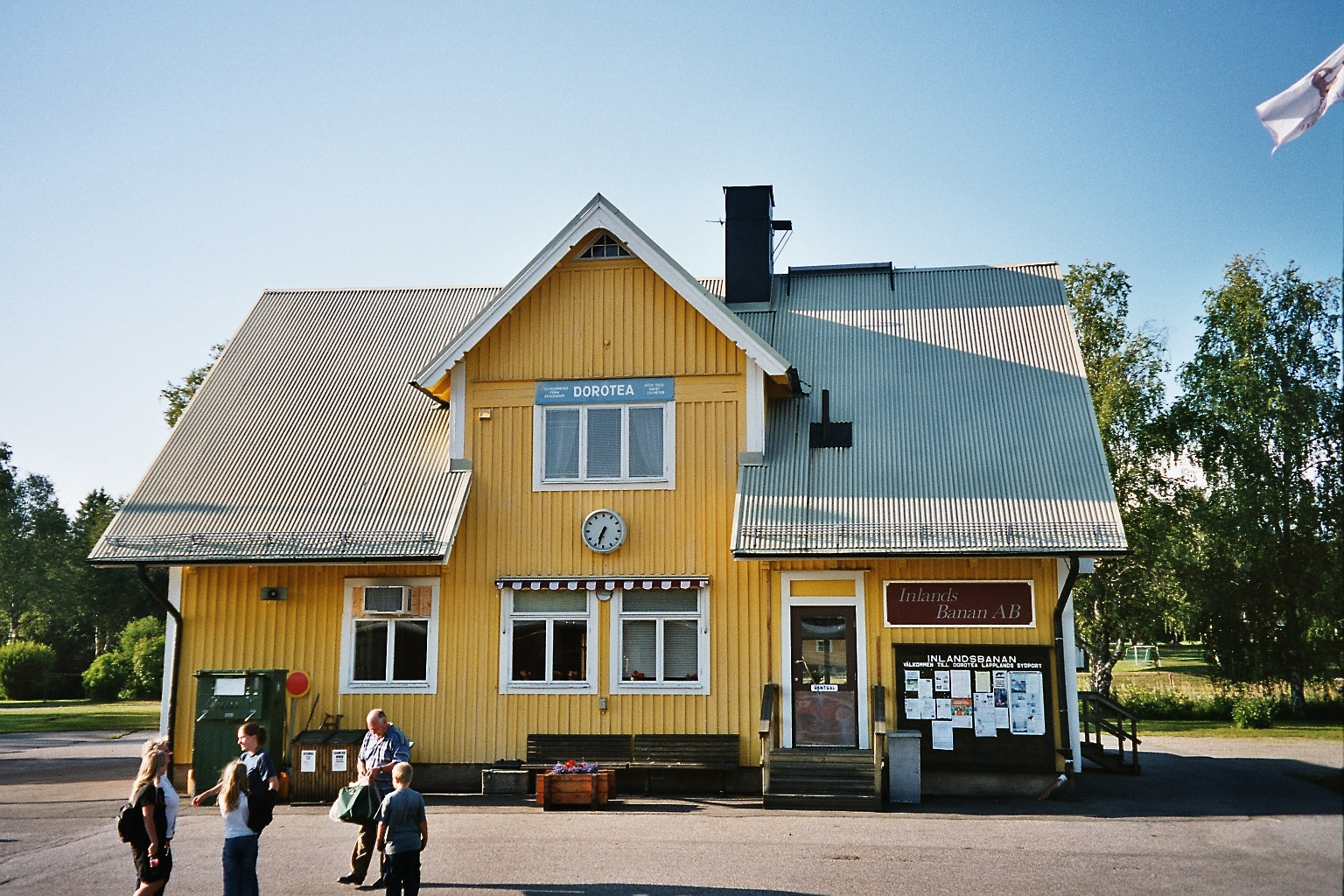
Dorotea railway station.

Dorotea Municipality (Swedish: Dorotea kommun; Southern Sami: Kraapohken tjïelte) is a municipality in Västerbotten County in northern Sweden. Its seat is located in Dorotea.

When the first local government acts were implemented in Sweden in 1863 Dorotea parish was made a rural municipality. In 1974 it was merged into Åsele Municipality. Already in 1980 it was split off, forming a new Dorotea Municipality. In 2023 it became the least populated municipality of Sweden.

== Locality ==
There is only one locality (or urban area) in Dorotea Municipality:

| # | Locality | Population |
|---|---|---|
| 1 | Dorotea | 1,571 |

== Demographics ==
This is a demographic table based on Dorotea Municipality's electoral districts in the 2022 Swedish general election sourced from SVT's election platform, in turn taken from SCB official statistics.

In total there were 2,457 inhabitants, with 1,937 Swedish citizens of voting age. 60.0% voted for the left coalition and 38.8% for the right coalition. Indicators are in percentage points except population totals and income.

| Location | Residents | Citizen adults | Left vote | Right vote | Employed | Swedish parents | Foreign heritage | Income SEK | Degree |
| Location | | | % | % | | | | | |
|---|---|---|---|---|---|---|---|---|---|
| Dorotea | 2,031 | 1,578 | 61.4 | 37.7 | 84 | 91 | 9 | 22,768 | 24 |
| Risbäck | 426 | 359 | 52.8 | 44.6 | 80 | 93 | 7 | 20,077 | 22 |
Source: SVT

== Economy ==
Amongst the industries in the municipality is one of the biggest caravan manufacturers in Scandinavia, Polarvagnen, now known as SoliferPolar as it has merged with Solifer. Other known industries and companies are Dorocell, Svenska Tält and S-Karosser.

In more recent years, several IT-companies have also moved to the municipality. In early 2000 the company Spray was located here but then moved to Sollefteå. The large house which held the support department and other personnel was later taken over by Datakompisen.

== Twinnings ==
- Haljala Parish, Estonia (since 1994)
