= List of governors of Västerbotten County =

Governor of Västerbotten County
- Landshövding i Västerbottens län
- Coat of arms of Västerbotten County.

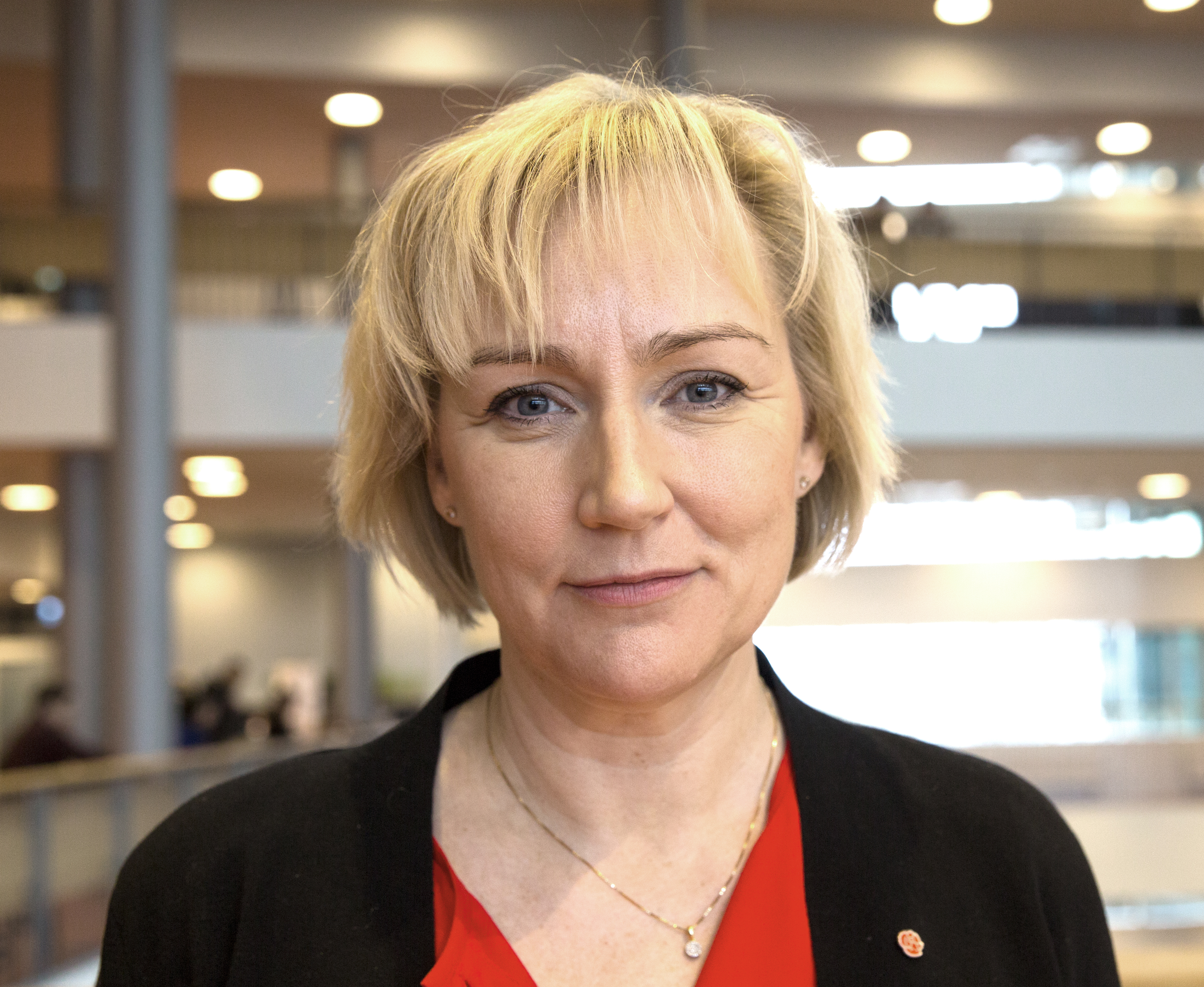
- Incumbent; Helene Hellmark Knutsson since 1 August 2020
- Västerbotten County Administrative Board
- Residence: The residence in Umeå, Umeå
- Appointer: Government of Sweden
- Term length: Six years (Note: The governor is often appointed for a six-year mandate. It can be extended if the person has not reached retirement age.)
- Formation: 1598
- First holder: Theodoricus Petri Ruuta
- Deputy: County Director (Länsrådet)
- Salary: SEK 97,800/month (2017)
- Website: Governor and County Director

This is a list of governors of Västerbotten County in Sweden, from 1598–present. This list is incomplete.

Governors of Österbotten and Västerbotten from 1598–1631

- Theodoricus Petri Ruuta 1598–1599
- Stellan Otto Mörner −1643
- Ernst (Erensgisle) Larsson Creutz (−1635) 1631

Governors of Västerbotten from 1638–present

- Stellan Otto von Mörner 1638–1641
- Frans Crusebjörn 1641–1653
- Johan Graan (−1679) 1653–1679
- Lorentz Creutz (1646–1698) 1675
- Jacob Fleming 1679
- Hans Clerk 1680–1683
- Hans Abraham Kruuse af Verchou 1683–1688
- Reinhold Johan von Fersen (1646–1716) 1688–
- Arvid Horn 1692
- Gustaf Douglas 1692–1705
- Otto Wilhelm Löwen (1659–1712) 1705–1712
- Anders Erik Ramsay (1646–1734) 1713–1717
- Magnus Fredrik Cronberg (1668–1740) 1717–1719
- Otto Reinhold Strömfelt (1679–1746) 1719
- Jacob Grundell (1657–1757) 1719–1733
- Gabriel Gabrielsson Gyllengrip (1687–1753) 1733–1753
- Olof Leijonstedt 1755–1759
- Johan Funck 1759–1762
- Martin Ehrensvan 1762–1765
- Olof Malmerfelt 1765–1769
- Carl Efraim Carpelan
- Magnus Adolf von Kothen 1769–1775
- Georg Gustaf Wrangel 1775–1781
- Carl Wilhelm Leijonstedt 1781–1782
- Fredrik von Stenhagen 1782–1789
- Johan Gustaf af Donner 1789–1795
- Pehr Adam Stromberg 1795–1811
- Gustaf Edelstam 1811–1817
- Georg Lars af Schmidt 1817–1842
- Gustaf Adolf Montgomery 1842–1856
- Gustaf Munthe 1856–1864
- Erik Viktor Almquist 1864–1872
- Axel Wästfelt 1873–1891
- Jesper Ingevald Crusebjörn (1843–1904) 1891–1904
- Axel Asker (1848–1924) t. f. 1900–1902
- Axel Fredrik Oscar Cederberg (1837–1913) t. f. 1902–1903
- Henning Theodor Biörklund (1849–1937) 1904–1916
- Axel Schotte (1860–1923) 1916–1923
- Robert Hagen (1868–1922) t. f. 1917–1918
- Nils Gustaf Ringstrand (1863–1935) t. f. 1918–1919 1923–1931
- Gustav Rosén (1876–1942) 1931–1942
- Elof Lindberg (1891–1956) 1943–1956
- Filip Kristensson (1898–1980) 1957–1965
- Karl G. Samuelsson (1911–1993) 1965–1971
- Bengt Lyberg (1912–1995) 1971–1978
- Sven Johansson (1928–2023) 1978–1991
- Görel Bohlin (1930–) 1992–1995
- Georg Andersson (1936–) 1995–2001
- Lorentz Andersson (1942–2023) 2001–2007
- Chris Heister (1950–) 2008–2012
- Magdalena Andersson (1954–) 2012–2020
- Helene Hellmark Knutsson (1969–) 2020–2026
