= Helene Hellmark Knutsson =

Swedish politician (born 1969)

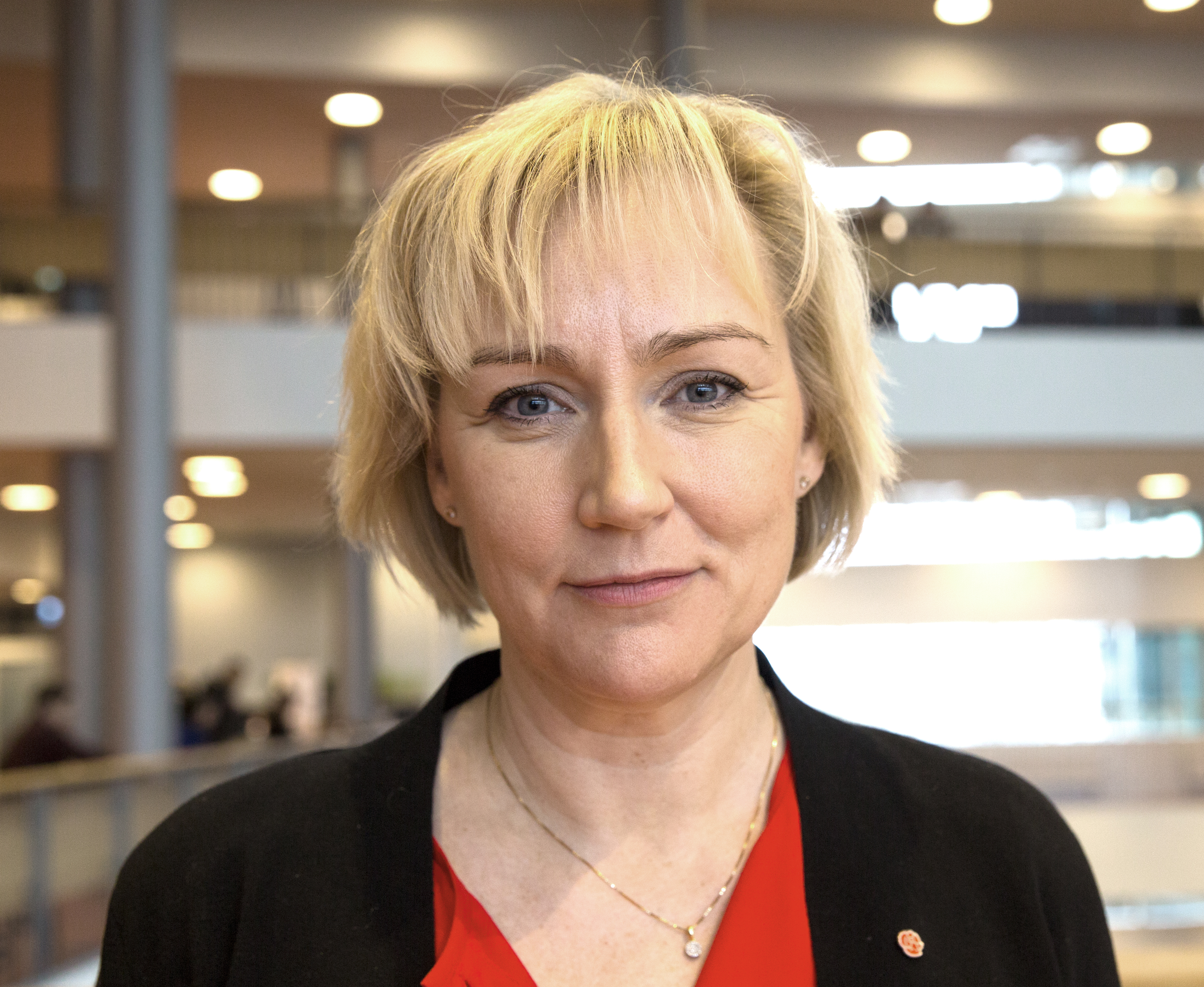

Governor of Västerbotten County
- Incumbent
- Assumed office 1 August 2020
- Monarch: Carl XVI Gustaf
- Prime Minister: Stefan Löfven; Magdalena Andersson; Ulf Kristersson
- Preceded by: Magdalena Andersson

Minister for Higher Education and Research
- In office 3 October 2014 – 21 January 2019
- Monarch: Carl XVI Gustaf
- Prime Minister: Stefan Löfven
- Preceded by: Jan Björklund
- Succeeded by: Matilda Ernkrans

Personal details
- Born: 12 September 1969 (age 56)
- Party: Social Democratic

Marie Helene Hellmark Knutsson (born 12 September 1969) is a Swedish politician and civil servant who currently serves as Governor of Västerbotten County since 1 August 2020.

A member of the Social Democrats, she served as Minister for Higher Education and Research in the cabinet of Stefan Löfven from October 2014 to January 2019.

She has studied statistics, history and macroeconomics at Stockholm University.

== Political career ==
Helene Hellmark Knutsson began her political career as a trade unionist. From 1996 to 2001, and then again in 2010, she was the ombudswoman for the Swedish Trade Union Confederation, an umbrella organization of 14 individual trade unions representing mainly blue-collar workers.

She was heavily involved in local politics and was a member of various committees: from 2001 to 2010 she held managerial positions in Sundbyberg, and between 2011 and 2013 she was chairwoman of the council for the Mälartal region and Stockholm. She was on the governing body of the Sveriges Kommuner och Landsting, a Swedish association of local authorities, from 2011 to 2014, and in Stockholm City Council she chaired the parliamentary group of the Swedish Social Democratic Labor Party from 2010 to 2014.

She also held a number of offices at party level. Since 2013 she has been the leader of the Social Democrats in the Stockholm region and a member of the presidency at national level.

In the Löfven I and II governments she was Minister for Higher Education and Research from 2014 to 2019.

Political offices
Preceded by Jan Björklund	Minister for Higher Education and Research; 2014–2019	Succeeded by Matilda Ernkrans
Civic offices
Preceded by Magdalena Andersson	Governor of Västerbotten County; 2020–	Incumbent
