= Ulf Rollof =

Swedish artist

Ulf Rollof is a Swedish artist, born 1961 in Karlskrona, Sweden. He was educated at Royal University College of Fine Arts 1982–1987.

== Solo exhibitions ==
Under at Millesgården, Lidingö, 2008 with architect Erik Andersson.
Golf of Mexico, Museo de la Ciudad, Querétaro, Mexico, 2008
7 C's', Venice Biennale, Venice Italy, 1999
