= Bjurholm Municipality =

Bjurholm Municipality Bjurholms kommun
- Municipality
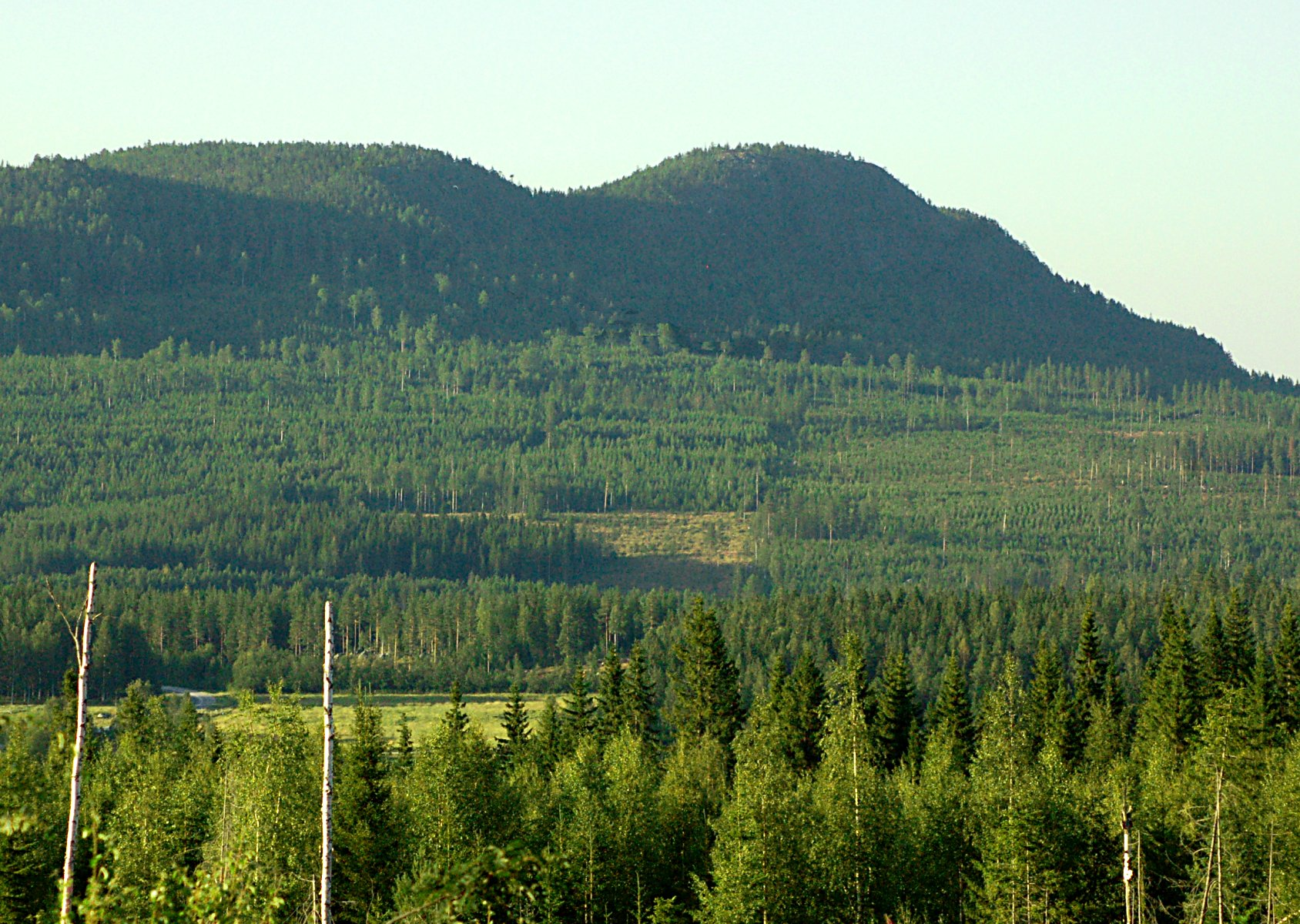

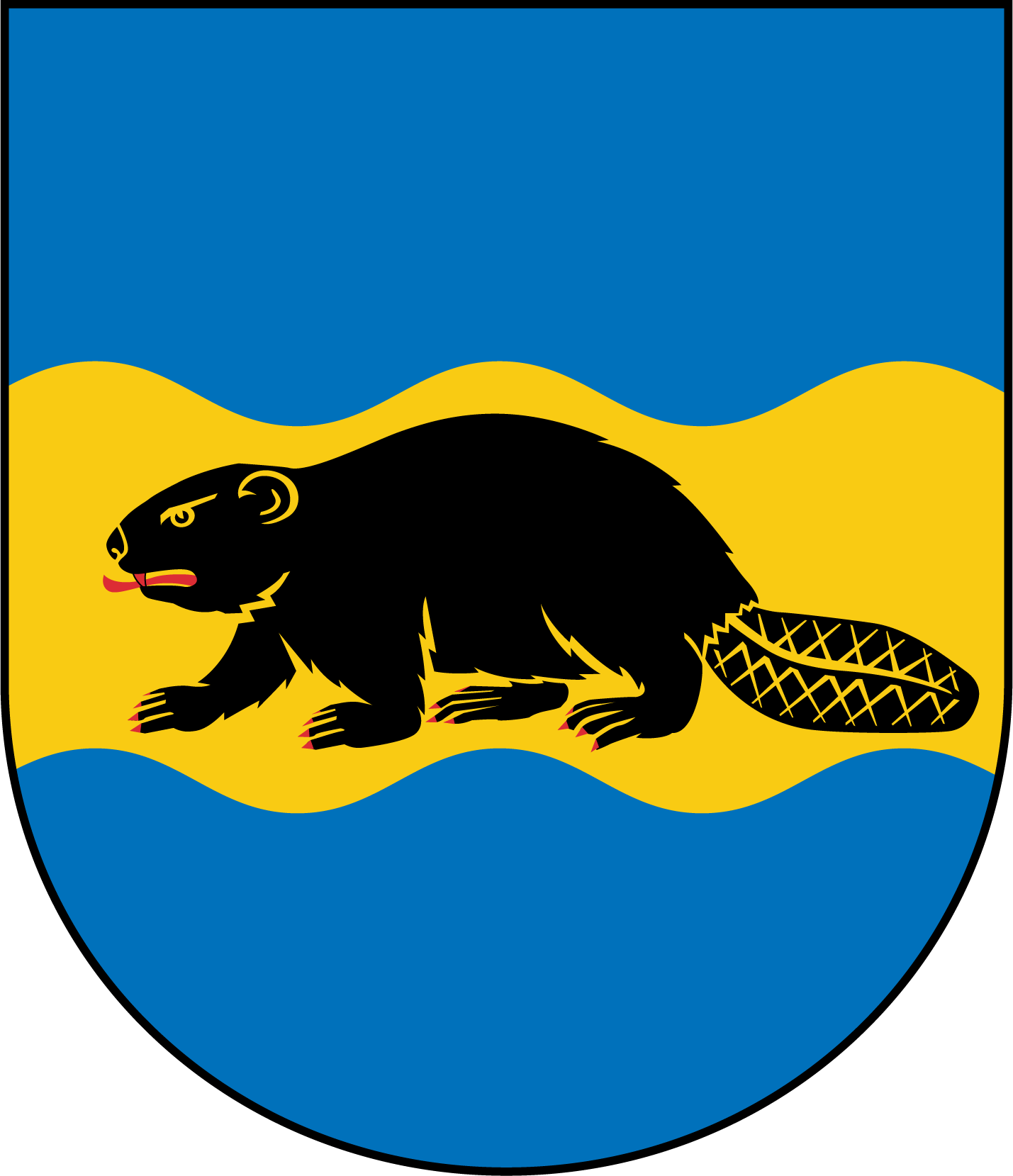
- Coat of arms

- Coordinates: 63°55′N 19°13′E
- Country: Sweden
- County: Västerbotten County
- Seat: Bjurholm

Area
  - Total: 1,363.77 km^{2} (526.55 sq mi)
  - Land: 1,306.75 km^{2} (504.54 sq mi)
  - Water: 57.02 km^{2} (22.02 sq mi)
- Area as of 1 January 2014.

Population (30 June 2025)
  - Total: 2,341
  - Density: 1.791/km^{2} (4.640/sq mi)
- Time zone: UTC+1 (CET)
  - Summer (DST): UTC+2 (CEST)
- ISO 3166 code: SE
- Province: Ångermanland
- Municipal code: 2403
- Website: www.bjurholm.se

Bjurholm Municipality (Swedish: Bjurholms kommun) is a municipality in Västerbotten County in northern Sweden. Its seat is located in Bjurholm.

The present municipality has the same territory as the one instituted in 1863, when the municipal system was implemented in Sweden. Between 1974 and 1983 it was, however, part of Vännäs Municipality. The split in 1983 made Bjurholm the least populated of all Swedish municipalities, and the population is still decreasing.

== Locality ==
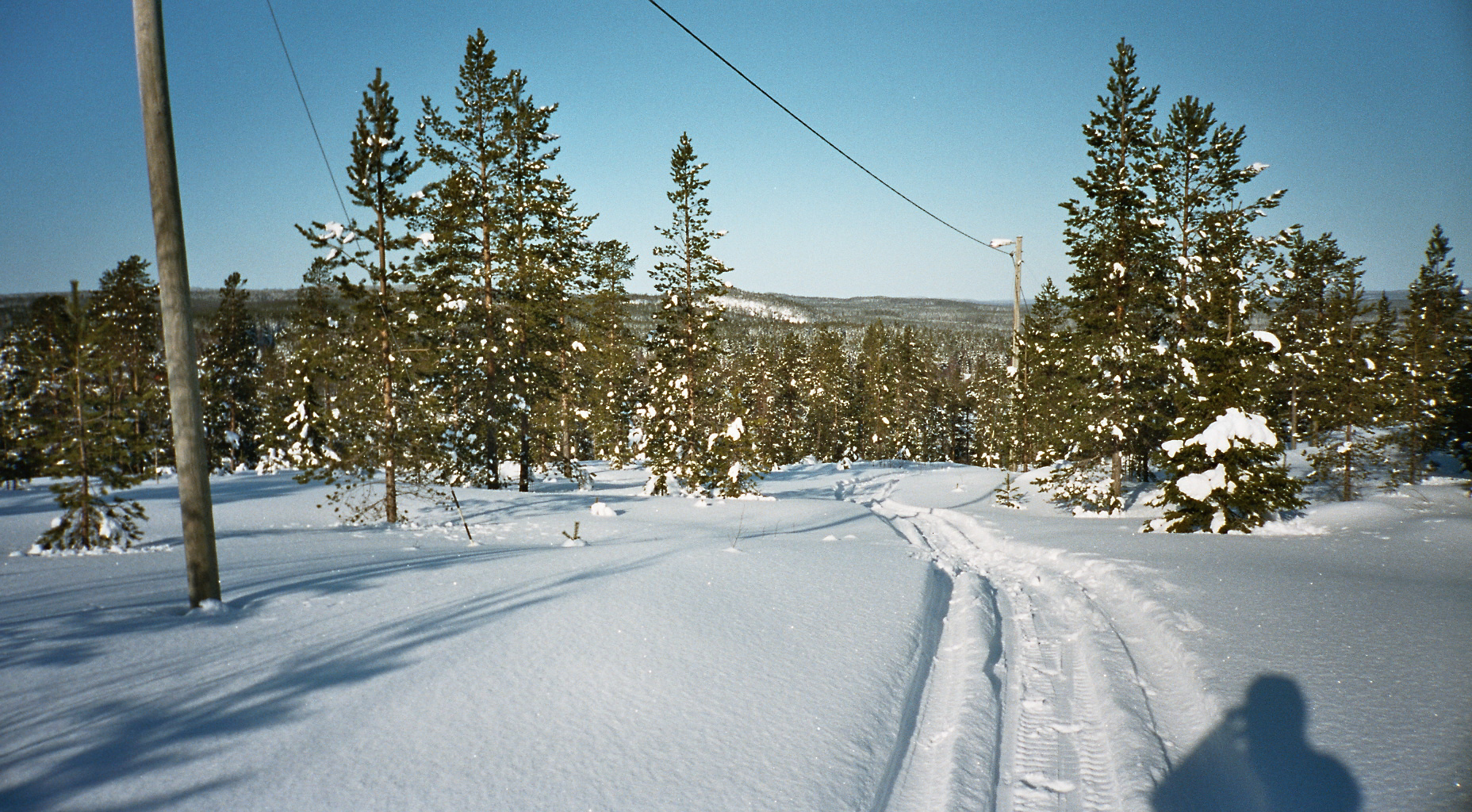
Snowmobile ride in Bjurholm Municipality.

There is only one locality (or urban area) in Bjurholm Municipality:

#	Locality	Population
1	Bjurholm	987

== Demographics ==
This is a demographic table based on Bjurholm Municipality's electoral districts in the 2022 Swedish general election sourced from SVT's election platform, in turn taken from SCB official statistics.

In total there were 2,394 residents, including 1,832 Swedish citizens of voting age. 42.6% voted for the left coalition and 56.5% for the right coalition. Indicators are in percentage points except population totals and income. The postal votes caused a difference between the sole electoral district and the overall results.

Location	Residents	Citizen adults	Left vote	Right vote	Employed	Swedish parents	Foreign heritage	Income SEK	Degree
Location			%	%					
Bjurholm	2,394	1,832	43.0	56.0	83	87	13	21,826	27
Source: SVT

== Sister cities ==
Bjurholm Municipality has two sister cities:

- Bardu, Norway
- Kuivaniemi, Finland

== Notable native ==
- Warner Oland, actor
