= Åsele =

- Coat of arms

- Location within Västerbotten Location within Sweden
- Coordinates: 64°09′N 17°21′E
- Country: Sweden
- Province: Lapland
- County: Västerbotten County
- Municipality: Åsele Municipality

Area
  - Total: 3.38 km^{2} (1.31 sq mi)

Population (31 December 2010)
  - Total: 1,798
  - Density: 532/km^{2} (1,380/sq mi)
- Time zone: UTC+1 (CET)
  - Summer (DST): UTC+2 (CEST)

Åsele (Swedish pronunciation: [ˈǒːsɛlɛ]) is a locality and the seat of Åsele Municipality in Västerbotten County, Lapland, Sweden. It had a population of 1,798 in 2010. Its elevation is 313 m (1027 ft).
