= Västerbotten County =

County (län) of Sweden

Västerbotten County Västerbottens län (Swedish)
- County of Sweden
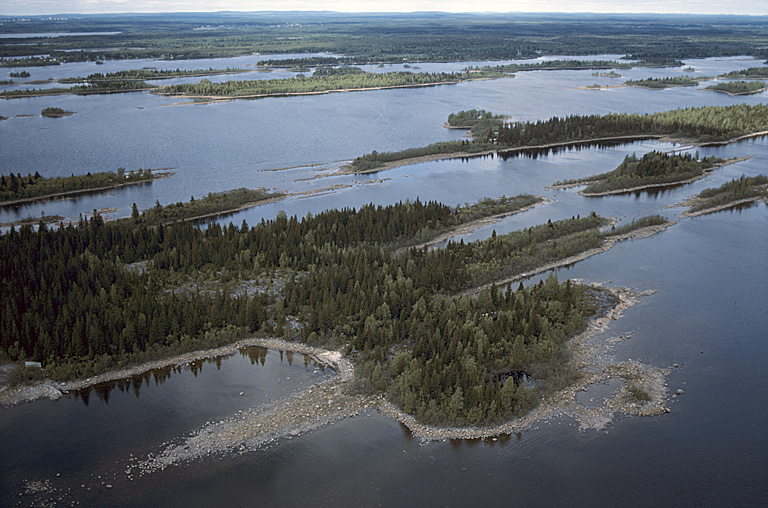

- Flag Coat of arms

- Västerbotten County in Sweden

- Location map of Västerbotten County in Sweden
- Coordinates: 64.85°N 17.9°E
- Country: Sweden
- Formed: 1638
- Capital: Umeå
- Municipalities: 15: Åsele; Bjurholm; Dorotea; Lycksele; Malå; Nordmaling; Norsjö; Robertsfors; Skellefteå; Sorsele; Storuman; Umeå; Vännäs; Vilhelmina; Vindeln

Government
  - Governor: Helene Hellmark Knutsson (Social Democratic)
  - Council: Region Västerbotten

Area
  - Total: 55,186.2 km^{2} (21,307.5 sq mi)

Population (31 December 2023)
  - Total: 278,729
  - Density: 5.05070/km^{2} (13.0813/sq mi)

GDP
  - Total: SEK 96 billion €10.257 billion (2015)
- Time zone: UTC+1 (CET)
  - Summer (DST): UTC+2 (CEST)
- ISO 3166 code: SE-AC
- NUTS Region: SE331
- Website: regionvasterbotten.se

Västerbotten County (Swedish: Västerbottens län, pronounced [ˈvɛstɛrˌbɔtːɛns ˈlɛːn]; Northern Sami: Västerbottena leatna, pronounced [ˈvɛstɛrˌbɔtːɛna ˈleat̪na]), sometimes called Westrobothnia, is a county or län in the north of Sweden. It shares borders with the counties of Västernorrland, Jämtland, and Norrbotten, as well as the Norwegian county of Nordland and the Gulf of Bothnia. Its capital is Umeå which is also the most populous city in Northern Sweden, and the second most populous city is Skellefteå. These two municipalities, both of which are located in the eastern coastal region, make up more than two thirds of Västerbotten's population. The interior of Västerbotten County is sparsely populated, and has vast wilderness areas. The land area of Västerbotten is larger than that of Denmark, the Netherlands or Switzerland.

== Provinces ==
Map of the county circa 1796

For history, geography, and culture, see: Västerbotten, Lapland, and Ångermanland

Västerbotten County, also known as Västerbottens län in Swedish, is located in the northern part of Sweden. It shares borders with Västernorrland, Jämtland, and Norrbotten counties, as well as the Norwegian county of Nordland and the Gulf of Bothnia. The county's capital is Umeå, which is home to approximately half of the population when combined with the largest town in the northern part, Skellefteå. These two municipalities make up the majority of the population. The county boasts vast wilderness areas and has a land area larger than that of Denmark, the Netherlands or Switzerland.

== Administration ==
The main aim of the County Administrative Board is to fulfil the goals set in national politics by the Riksdag and the Government, to co-ordinate the interests of the county, to promote the development of the county, to establish regional goals, and to safeguard the due process of law in the handling of each case. The County Administrative Board is a Government Agency headed by a Governor. See List of Västerbotten Governors.

== Politics ==
The Regional Council of Västerbotten or Region Västerbotten.

== Riksdag elections ==
The table details all Riksdag election results of Västerbotten County since the unicameral era began in 1970. The blocs denote which party would support the Prime Minister or the lead opposition party towards the end of the elected parliament.

Year	Turnout	Votes	V	S	MP	C	L	KD	M	SD	NyD	Left	Right
1970	87.9	145,741	2.9	46.1		21.6	17.4	3.7	7.8			49.0	46.8
1973	90.1	150,036	3.9	45.0		26.2	11.8	3.9	8.5			48.9	46.5
1976	90.9	159,435	4.1	45.3		26.3	11.7	3.3	8.8			49.3	46.8
1979	90.4	161,941	5.4	46.5		21.0	12.5	3.3	10.7			51.9	44.2
1982	90.9	165,350	5.5	49.3	1.2	19.2	7.8	3.9	12.7			54.8	39.7
1985	89.4	164,748	5.7	48.5	1.2	18.1	14.5		11.3			54.2	43.9
1988	86.6	159,304	5.9	48.4	4.6	14.3	12.0	5.2	8.9			58.9	35.2
1991	86.4	161,448	5.4	45.3	3.3	12.6	9.9	8.6	10.8		3.9	50.7	41.9
1994	87.0	166,348	7.3	52.0	5.8	9.4	8.1	5.0	11.1		0.5	65.2	33.6
1998	82.1	157,839	15.7	43.2	4.9	6.6	5.4	10.7	11.7			63.8	34.5
2002	80.7	155,369	11.5	46.5	4.5	11.2	10.1	8.5	6.5	0.3		62.4	36.3
2006	82.9	162,490	8.4	43.9	5.9	11.8	6.4	6.5	13.7	1.1		58.1	38.3
2010	85.4	170,598	10.0	42.2	7.2	7.4	6.0	5.4	17.7	2.7		59.4	36.5
2014	86.9	175,279	11.0	42.0	5.9	6.7	4.4	4.3	13.8	7.4		58.9	29.0
2018	87.9	178,837	12.7	38.1	3.9	10.1	3.9	5.2	13.5	10.9		64.8	33.6
2022	85.8	179,712	8.5	40.7	5.4	7.8	3.1	4.7	14.2	14.5		62.4	36.5

== Municipalities ==
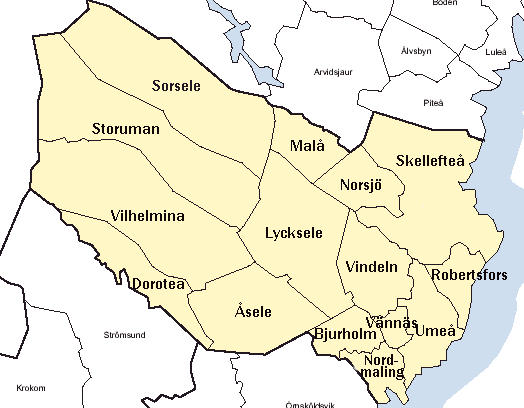

In Lapland Province:

- Dorotea
- Lycksele
- Malå
- Sorsele
- Storuman
- Vilhelmina
- Åsele

In Västerbotten Province:

- Norsjö
- Robertsfors
- Skellefteå
- Umeå
- Vindeln
- Vännäs

In Ångermanland Province:

- Bjurholm
- Nordmaling

== Demographics ==
=== Foreign background ===
SCB have collected statistics on backgrounds of residents since 2002. These tables consist of all who have two foreign-born parents or are born abroad themselves. The chart lists election years and the last year on record alone.

Location	2002	2006	2010	2014	2018	2019
Bjurholm	2.9	4.5	7.7	10.7	13.2	12.8
Dorotea	5.1	5.3	7.5	8.3	9.0	8.7
Lycksele	5.9	6.4	7.8	9.7	12.6	12.9
Malå	3.6	4.0	5.8	7.5	11.6	11.9
Nordmaling	3.8	4.3	6.0	8.5	10.8	11.0
Norsjö	3.0	3.8	7.0	9.6	11.4	11.2
Robertsfors	4.7	5.2	6.7	8.6	10.3	11.1
Skellefteå	4.4	5.6	6.6	8.2	10.0	10.3
Sorsele	3.1	5.4	10.2	12.3	13.4	13.3
Storuman	3.4	4.0	4.8	6.9	10.1	10.3
Umeå	9.4	10.3	11.7	12.7	14.9	15.5
Vilhelmina	3.2	3.5	6.2	8.5	9.5	9.4
Vindeln	3.7	4.5	6.4	9.1	12.2	12.8
Vännäs	4.0	4.1	5.7	8.3	9.4	9.6
Åsele	3.3	4.8	7.8	10.7	13.8	13.7
Total	6.4	7.3	8.6	10.4	12.6	13.0
Source: SCB

== Heraldry ==
The arms for Västerbotten County is a combination of the arms of Västerbotten, Swedish Lapland, and Ångermanland. When it is shown with a royal crown, it represents the County Administrative Board. Blazon: "Parted per fess, base parted per pale, the arms of Västerbotten, the arms of Lapland, and the arms of Ångermanland."
