= James Robertson Dickson =

Swedish shipping and logging businessman

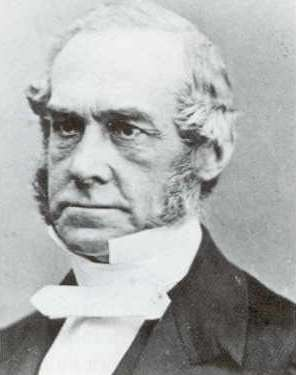
- Born: 10 March 1810; Gothenburg
- Died: 4 July 1873; Askim
- Known for: logging

James Robertson Dickson or James R:son Dickson (10 March 1810 – 4 July 1873) was a Swedish shipping and logging businessman. He was a partner in James Dickson Co who ran shipping and logging in Sweden. He was involved in unsuccessful court cases that accused his company of sawing up timber belonging to the crown at Baggböle in northern Sweden.

== Life ==
Dickson was born in Gothenburg in 1810. He was the eldest of four children born to Scotsman Robert Dickson (1782–1858) and Wilhelma Charlotta Dickson née Murray.

He was a partner in James Dickson Co who ran shipping and logging in Sweden. The business employed the largest merchant fleet in Sweden with offices in both Gothenburg and London. James Robertson Dickson was involved in establishing timber sawing and loading stations in many of the rivers of Norrland.

Dickson was in charge of the largest water powered sawmill in Sweden on the Ume River at Baggböle. Dickson awarded 50 Kroner to the local minister for his design work at the opening ceremony of, Baggböle manor, the manager's impressive residence in 1847. At this mill the locals felled more trees on land that belonged to the Crown than they had agreed. So infamous were these methods that a new word in Swedish was derived from the village's name, "baggböleri", a derogative term for deforestation.

Dickson's sawmill's business methods came to notice when the owner Dickson was taken to court on 15 June at Lycksele and 17 June 1850 at Degerfors district court. The case was circumstantial but the accusation was that Dickson had encouraged his suppliers upstream to supply him with logs that did not belong to them. Dickson said that the sawmill was processing a large number of logs but he was not aware where the logs came from. The case was complicated because the crown was well aware that various people were felling their trees and the local population was very grateful for the wealth that the sawmill was creating for its suppliers. Dickson was able to escape a conviction by swearing an oath regarding his lack of knowledge of what had happened. This was allowed under Swedish law where the case was circumstantial.

Dickson was fortunate to avoid prosecution. Even if he had been unaware of it, his company was guilty of receiving stolen goods. Since 1842 his manager had taken in more than the 4,500 logs per annum than had been agreed. This could not continue and in 1866–7 the company was again taken to court. This was the first time the word "Baggböleri" was seen in print. The rights to the timber was settled upon the farmers and the local villages. This put them in a position of power but the only viable purchaser was the sawmill, which meant that the sawmill was able to exploit its position over the farmers as it was the sawmill defining the price. This exploitation also went under the term "Baggböleri".

The sawmill was able to use its power to agree logging contracts with local villages. Under these agreements it was in no one's interest to replant the felled trees. This caused deforestation and in the 1880s the sawmills contracts had to be prevented to stop environmental damage.

Dickson never married and died in Billdalsgatan, Askim in 1873 without children.
