= List of hydroelectric power stations in Sweden =

The following is a list of hydroelectric power stations in Sweden with a nameplate capacity > 100 MW.

The electricity production from Swedish hydroelectric power stations covers around 45% of Swedish electricity consumption.

== Hydroelectric power stations ==
Name	Capacity (MW)	River (basin)
Akkats	150	Lesser Lule River
Älvkarleby	125	Dalälven
Bastusel	120	Skellefte River
Bergeforsen	168	Indalsälven
Forsmo	160	Ångerman
Gallejaur	219	Skellefte River
Gammelänge	150	Lesser Lule River
Grundfors	103.5	Ume River
Hjälta	178	Faxälven
Harrsele	223	Ume River
Harsprånget	977	Stora Luleälven
Hojum	170	Göta älv
Höljes	120	Klarälven
Hölleforsen	148	Indalsälven
Järnvägsforsen	100	Ljungan
Järpströmmen	114	Indalsälven
Kilforsen	288	Fjällsjöälven
Korsselbränna	130	Fjällsjöälven
Krångede	250	Indalsälven
Krokströmmen	113	Ljusnan
Kvistforsen	140	Skellefte River
Lasele	149.6	Ångerman
Laxede	207	Lule älv
Långå	156	Ljusnan
Letsi	456	Lesser Lule River
Ligga	324	Stora Luleälven
Messaure	442	Stora Luleälven
Midskog	150	Indalsälven
Moforsen	135	Ångerman
Nämforsen	114.6	Ångerman
Olden	116	Långan
Olidan	130	Göta älv
Porjus	465	Stora Luleälven
Porsi	274	Lule älv
Ramsele	157	Faxälven
Ritsem	304	Stora Luleälven
Sällsjö	160	Indalsälven
Seitevare	225	Lesser Lule River
Stadsforsen	132.55	Indalsälven
Stalon	130.2	Ångerman
Storfinnforsen	112	Faxälven
Stornorrfors	599.4	Ume River
Torpshammar	110	Gimån
Trängslet	330	Dalälven
Tuggen	110	Ume River
Vargfors	122	Skellefte River
Vietas	306	Stora Luleälven

== See also ==
- List of power stations in Sweden
- Wind power in Sweden
- Biofuel in Sweden
- Renewable energy in Sweden
- Renewable energy by country
