= Listed buildings in Västerbotten County =

There are 75 listed buildings (Swedish: byggnadsminne) in Västerbotten County.

== Lycksele Municipality ==
Image	Name	Premises	Number of buildings	Year built	Architect	Coordinates	ID
	Gamla folkskolan i Lycksele	Magistern 1	1	1891–93	Carl Fridolf Engelbert Sandgren	64.59461°N 18.67435°E	21300000012564

== Nordmaling Municipality ==
Image	Name	Premises	Number of buildings	Year built	Architect	Coordinates	ID
	Levar Hotell	Levar 4:19	2	1827		63.57072°N 19.52499°E	21300000012568
	Tallbergsbron	Tallberg 3:32	1	1916–1919		63.79396°N 19.34829°E	21300000019504

== Norsjö Municipality ==
Image	Name	Premises	Number of buildings	Year built	Architect	Coordinates	ID
	Dahlbergsgården	Bastutjärn 1:27-28	7	1826		64.94753°N 19.60128°E	21300000012573
	Rundloge i Kvammarnäs	Kvammarnäs 1:9	1	1853		64.95244°N 19.26701°E	21300000012571

== Robertsfors Municipality ==
Image	Name	Premises	Number of buildings	Year built	Architect	Coordinates	ID
	Dalkarlså herrgård	Dalkarlså 10:2	3	1817	Johan Anders Linder	64.04479°N 20.85673°E	21300000012528
	Mareografen i Ratan	Ratahamn 1:3	1	1891		63.99138°N 20.89042°E	21300000026301
	Portbyggnaden på Bygdeborg	Skinnarbyn 5:12	1	1690		64.06051°N 20.85484°E	21300000012585
	Rataskärs båk	Stensäter 1:46	1	1828		63.99257°N 20.89608°E	21300000012529
	Tingshuset i Ånäset	Nybyn 47:1; Previously Domaren 1	2	1896–1902	Carl Fridolf Engelbert Sandgren	64.27678°N 21.03887°E	21300000012577
	Tullgården i Ratan	Ratahamn 1:3	1	1861	A Gadelius	63.98988°N 20.88645°E	21300000012918

== Skellefteå Municipality ==
Image	Name	Premises	Number of buildings	Year built	Architect	Coordinates	ID
	Rijfska gården, Kusmark	Kusmark 16:15 previously 16:3	3			64.88075°N 20.77871°E	21300000012628
	Stationshuset, perrongtaket, Jörn	Västra Jörnsmarken 1:28, 1:31	2			65.05412°N 20.03047°E	21300000012561
	Anderstorps gård	Anderstorpsgården 3 previously Hedensbyn 13:49, 13:57; Hedensbyn 13:89	5			64.74576°N 20.98453°E	21300000012591
	Bonnstan (Skellefteå kyrkstad)	Kaplansbordet 2:4; Klockarbordet 1:6; Prästbordet 1:50, 8:1 etc.	none			64.75121°N 20.93002°E	21300000012623
	Byske kyrkstad	Byske 7:2	8			64.95633°N 21.19394°E	21300000012530
	Drängsmarks vatten-, ångsåg	Drängsmark S:4 (Samfälld mark till Drängsmarks by	2			64.93419°N 20.95603°E	21300000012533
	Ekorren 4 (Garvare Anderssons gård)	Ekorren 4	1			64.75019°N 20.94567°E	21300000012604
	Finnfors gamla kraftstation	Granfors 1:8	2			64.79306°N 20.33778°E	21300000012610
	Garveri i Hembyn	Bursiljum 1:20	1			64.48519°N 20.86293°E	21300000012527
	Gåsörens fyr	Gåsören 1:2	3			64.66327°N 21.31769°E	21300000012640
	Lejonströmsbron,	Skellefteå Prästbord 1:50 previously 8:8	1			64.74998°N 20.91365°E	21300000012597
	Långlogen i Anderstorp	Sörböle 2:2 previously Böle 2:2	1			64.74398°N 20.96125°E	21300000012588
	Majorsbostället Nyborg	Skellefteå 4:1 previously 2:61; Stadsäga 1387	4			64.75000°N 20.93752°E	21300000012618
	Markstedtska gården	Falken 5 previously 1	1			64.75002°N 20.94530°E	21300000012605
	Nybygget Rismyrliden	Skellefteå-Rismyrliden 1:1-2	13			64.71911°N 20.30451°E	21300000012599
	Repslageriet på Storkåge	Storkåge 16:65 previously Storkåge 12:15	1			64.83414°N 20.99727°E	21300000012603
	Strömsholms herrgård	Bureå 8:32	2			64.61920°N 21.16033°E	21300000012525
	Åbacka paviljong	Bureå 7:40 previously 7:49	1			64.61781°N 21.17222°E	21300000012520
	Östra, västra gathusen	Haren 9	2			64.75002°N 20.94882°E	21300000012615

== Sorsele Municipality ==
Image	Name	Premises	Number of buildings	Year built	Architect	Coordinates	ID
	Zakrisbo	Sorseleskogen 1:1	11			65.40122°N 17.50819°E	21300000012637
	Åkernäs	Kronoöverloppsmarken 1:1	7			65.70987°N 16.24739°E	21300000012632
	Örnbo	Kronoöverloppsmarken 1:1	6			65.94735°N 16.32184°E	21300000012635

== Storuman Municipality ==
Image	Name	Premises	Number of buildings	Year built	Architect	Coordinates	ID
	previously Järnvägshotellet, Storuman	Kulturen 2 previously Luspen 11:2	1			65.09648°N 17.11477°E	21300000012639
	Stationshuset, Storuman	Luspen 1:65	1			65.09654°N 17.11241°E	21300000012924

== Umeå Municipality ==
placeholder

== Vilhelmina Municipality ==
Image	Name	Premises	Number of buildings	Year built	Architect	Coordinates	ID
	Skollägdan 11	Skollägdan 11	1			64.62865°N 16.64849°E	21300000012849
	Dainanäs fjällägenhet	Dainan 1:1	7			64.93038°N 16.12176°E	21300000012852
	Oräddska gården (Norgefarargården)	Klimpfjäll 1:73	1			65.06247°N 14.79559°E	21300000012854

== Vindeln Municipality ==
Image	Name	Premises	Number of buildings	Year built	Architect	Coordinates	ID
	Gamla Tingshuset i Vindeln (Degerfors Gamla Tingshus)	Kyrkoherden 1 previously Degerfors 30:1	3			64.19325°N 19.70933°E	21300000012536
	Åströmska gården	Degerfors 1:14 (del av	3			64.19545°N 19.71418°E	21300000012535

== Vännäs Municipality ==
Image	Name	Premises	Number of buildings	Year built	Architect	Coordinates	ID
	Stationshuset, Vännäs	Vännäs 51:1	1	1891	Folke Zettervall	63.90856°N 19.75006°E	21300000012513
	Vännäs läger Fridhem	Fridhem 1	4	1900		63.90977°N 19.73893°E	21000001645341
	Vännäs läger	Vännäs 50:30	5	1900		63.90923°N 19.73337°E	21300000012855

== Åsele Municipality ==
Image	Name	Premises	Number of buildings	Year built	Architect	Coordinates	ID
	Länsmansgården, Åsele Municipality	Gäddan 1 Previously Åsele 2:100	2	1860s		64.16424°N 17.36131°E	21300000012911
	Torvsjö kvarnar	Torvsjö 1:16; Previously Kvarnsamfälligheten litt G1	13	circa 1850		64.37351°N 17.25933°E	21300000012914
	Åsele bryggeri	Bryggaren 1 Previously Åsele 2:25	1	1888	Johan Vikberg	64.16145°N 17.35955°E	21300000012916
