= Arboretum Norr =

Arboretum in Baggböle, Sweden

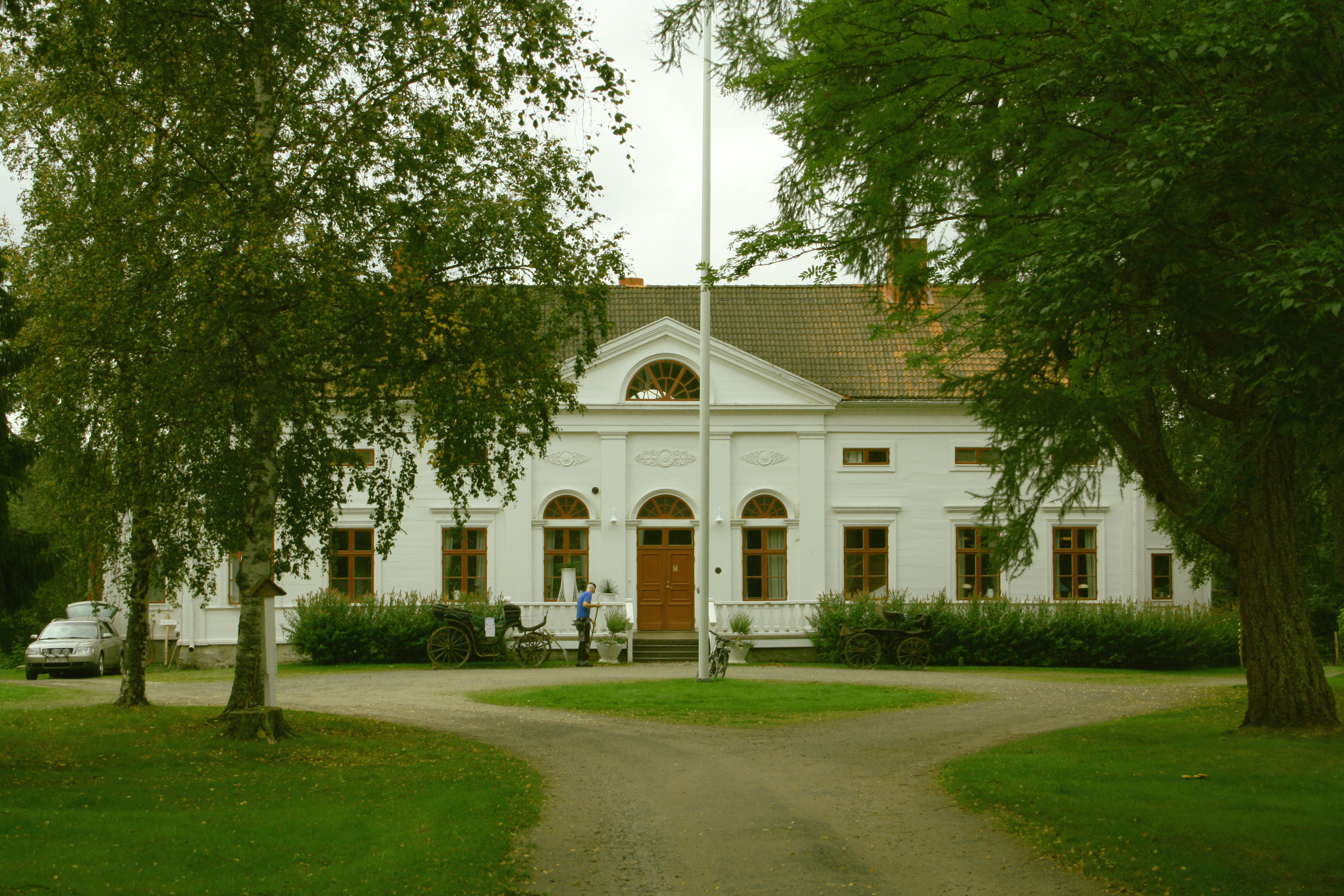
- Baggböle mansion by Johan Anders Linder
- Interactive map of Arboretum Norr
- Type: Arboretum and public park
- Location: Sweden
- Coordinates: 63°50′24.41″N 20°6′58.12″E
- Area: 20 acres (8.1 ha)
- Created: 1975
- Open: All year
- Website: www.arboretum-norr.se

Arboretum Norr (English: Northern Arboretum) is an arboretum in Baggböle, Sweden, on the Ume River, about eight kilometers west of Umeå city centre.

== History ==
The arboretum is in Baggböle, a settlement known for its water-powered sawmill. So infamous were the sawmill owners' methods that a new word in Swedish was derived from the name of "Baggböle". The Swedish word baggböleri is a derogative term for the idea of deforestation. The mansion that still stands was designed by Johan Anders Linder and built in 1846.

== Description ==
Arboretum Norr covers an area of about 20 acres, with more than 1,600 plants from about 280 species, planted since 1981. The plants are mostly from Scandinavian countries. One of the arboretum's three functions is to see which species thrive and survive at far northerly latitudes, which may in turn lead to a greater variety of climate-adapted shrubs and trees in northern Scandinavia. The mansion at the centre of the park used to be the headquarters of a business that felled trees as part of a sawmill business in the nineteenth century. The other two objectives of the arboretum are to support the study of trees and shrubs (Dendrology) and to supply a visitor attraction near the village of Baggböle.

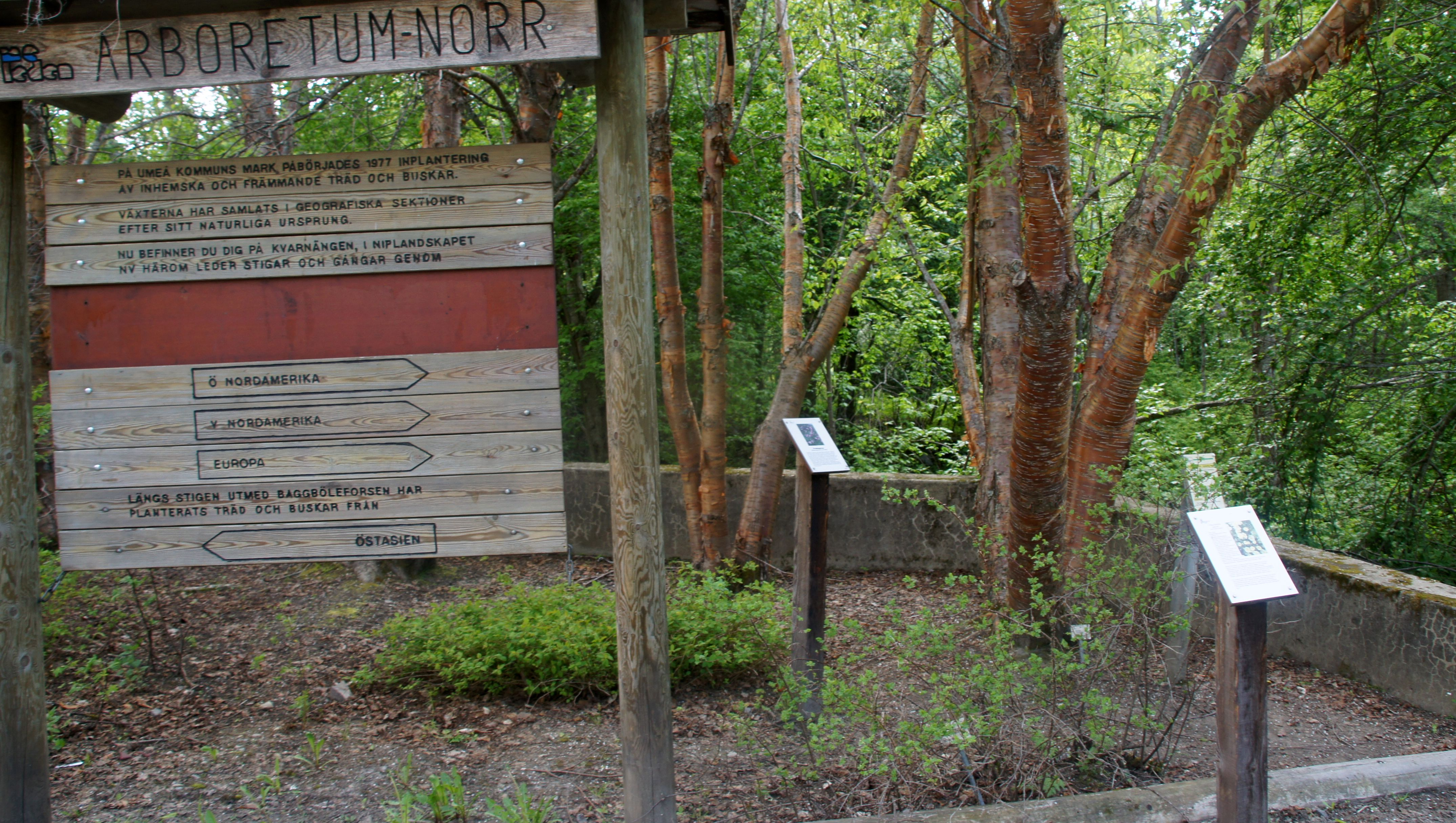
Arboretum Norr

Arboretum Norr was formed in 1975 through a collaboration between Umeå University, the Swedish University of Agricultural Sciences in Umeå and City Council. The arboretum is currently run by a foundation, and funded by the contribution of several municipalities, companies and other institutions. It is controlled by the Sweden Agricultural University Department of Northern Agricultural Science in Umeå.

The park stretches for about a mile along the banks of the Ume River surrounding the mansion. Baggböle manor is run as a separate business and is used as a conference venue and a restaurant. The park is on the north bank of the River Ume by the rapids.

In 2014 the park was chosen as the location for four art installations that are designed as part of the "Förflyttningar" art project. The project is led by three artists who intend to link art with nature. The project received funding because Umeå was made a European Capital of Culture in 2014.
