= Storfinnforsen Hydroelectric Power Station =

- Location within Sweden
- Official name: Storfinnforsens kraftverk
- Location: Västernorrland County, Sweden
- Coordinates: 63.598459°N 16.121793°E
- Purpose: Power
- Status: Operational
- Opening date: 1954
- Owner: E.ON
- Operator: E.ON

Dam and spillways
- Type of dam: Concrete buttress dam
- Impounds: Faxälven
- Spillway type: Over the dam

Power Station
- Commission date: 1954
- Hydraulic head: 49.5 m
- Turbines: 3 Francis-type
- Installed capacity: 112 MW
- Annual generation: 536 GWh

Storfinnforsen Hydroelectric Power Station (Swedish: Storfinnforsens kraftverk) is a run-of-the-river hydroelectric power station on the Faxälven, in Västernorrland County, Sweden.

The power plant was operational in 1953 (or 1954). It is owned and operated by E.ON.

== Dam ==
Storfinnforsen Dam consists of a concrete buttress dam (length 800 m) with 100 buttresses and an embankment dam (length 400 m) on the left side. There are cracks in the upstream frontplate as well as in some of the supports.

== Power plant ==
The power plant contains 3 Francis turbine-generators. The total nameplate capacity is 112 (or 132) MW. Its average annual generation is 536 GWh. The hydraulic head is 49.5 m.

== See also ==
- List of hydroelectric power stations in Sweden
