= Moforsen Hydroelectric Power Station =

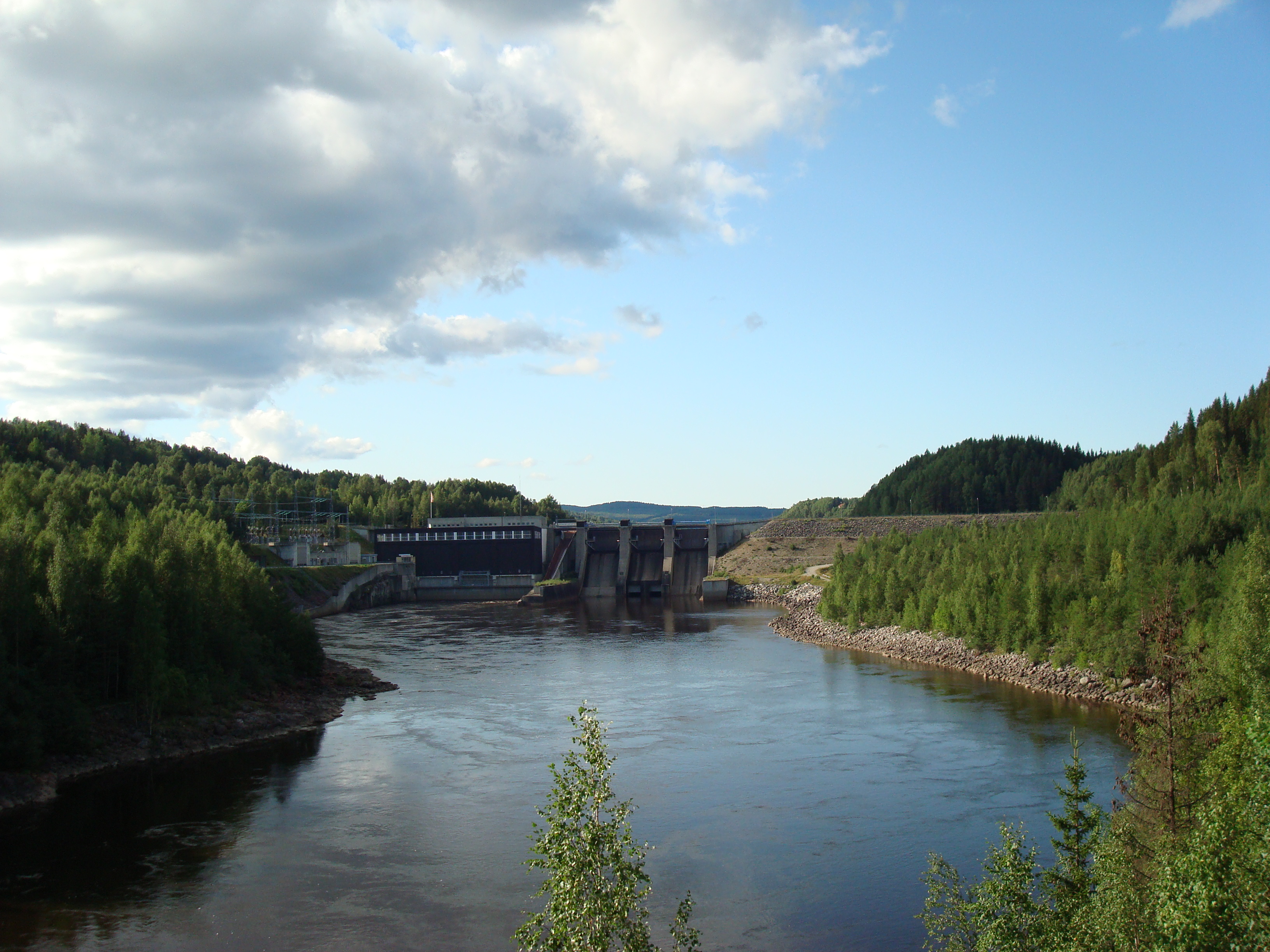

- Location within Sweden
- Official name: Moforsens kraftverk
- Location: municipality Sollefteå, Sweden
- Coordinates: 63.368793°N 16.988940°E
- Purpose: Power
- Status: Operational
- Opening date: 1968
- Owner: E.ON
- Operator: E.ON

Dam and spillways
- Type of dam: Concrete gravity dam
- Impounds: Ångerman
- Spillway type: Over the dam

Power Station
- Commission date: 1968
- Hydraulic head: 28.1 m
- Turbines: 3 x 45 MW Kaplan-type
- Installed capacity: 135 MW
- Annual generation: 641 GWh

Moforsen Hydroelectric Power Station (Swedish: Moforsens kraftverk) is a run-of-the-river hydroelectric power plant on the Ångerman, municipality Sollefteå, Sweden. About 15 km downstream of Moforsen is Forsmo Hydroelectric Power Station.

The power plant was operational in 1968. It is owned by E.ON.

== Dam ==
Moforsen Dam consists of a concrete gravity dam on the right side and an embankment dam on the left side. The dam features a spillway with 3 gates over the dam, that is located in the middle.

== Power plant ==
The power plant contains 3 Kaplan turbine-generators. The total nameplate capacity is 135 MW. Its average annual generation is 641 GWh. The hydraulic head is 28.1 m.

== See also ==
- List of hydroelectric power stations in Sweden
