= Baggböle Manor =

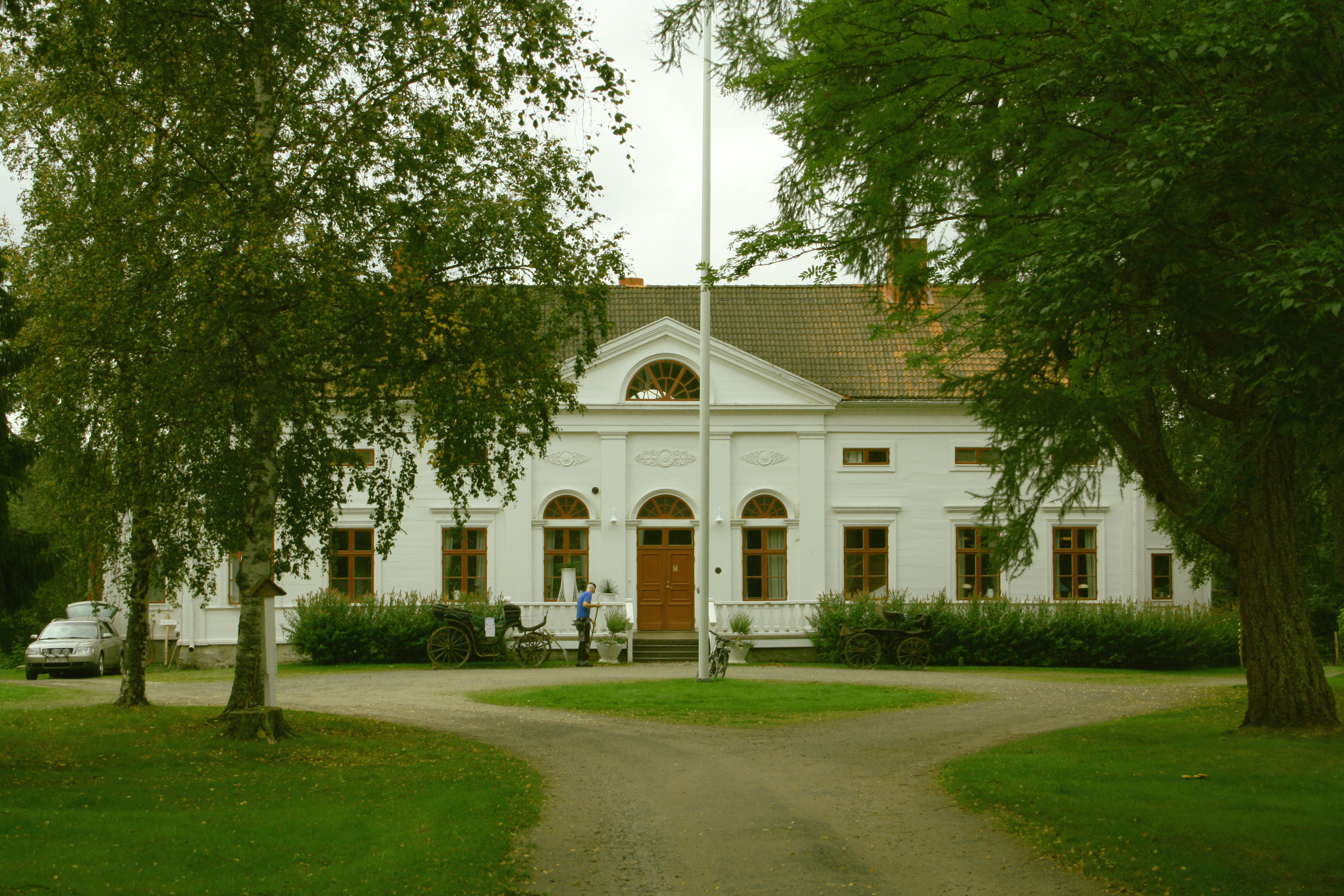
- Baggböle Manor in August 2011

General information
- Town or city: Umeå, Västerbotten
- Country: Sweden
- Coordinates: 63°50′25″N 20°07′01″E
- Completed: 1846

Design and construction
- Architect(s): Johan Anders Linder

Baggböle Manor (Swedish: Baggböle herrgård) is a manor house, located on the Ume River in Baggböle, about 10 kilometres (6.2 mi) northwest of the city of Umeå in northern Sweden. It was completed in 1846 as the residence for the manager of Baggböle Sawmill.

== History ==
The large house was completed in 1846 as the residence for the manager of Baggböle Sawmill. The architectural plans for the building were created by Johan Anders Linder, the minister of Umeå parish, who along with being a writer and minister, was often hired as an architect and builder in and around Umeå. He designed the house in the Empire style. Linder recorded that he was awarded 50 Swedish crowns for his design work at the opening ceremony of the building in 1847, by James Robertson Dickson, who represented the Gothenburg firm of James Dickson & Co that had acquired the sawmill in 1840. Dickson would stand trial twice, accused of what has since been called "baggböleri" in Sweden, i.e. the illegal felling of timber in forests belonging to the Crown.

== The architecture ==
The mansion was built of timber covered with planed wood panels, and was painted with a white linseed oil-based paint to make it resemble a contemporary stone house. With 500 m^{2} (5,382 sq ft) of floor space on two floors it was one of the area's largest homes. Both the front and the rear of the building has a neoclassical facade decorated with Doric pilasters, and both the inside and the outside of the mansion is still very well preserved. Very little is, however, preserved of the two wings of the mansion, the garden, and the various other buildings that originally belonged to the mansion, buildings that included a school, a stable, two gazebos and a skittle alley.

== Sawmill era ==
The mansion was built at the top of the river bank, overlooking the buildings that were gathered closer to the water, in an area that now holds an arboretum: barracks for the workers, offices, materiel sheds, a blacksmith's shop, a coal house and a boathouse. Neither those buildings nor the two actual sawmills – the upper built in 1842, the lower in 1850, with eight water-powered powersaws in each - are, however, left today. All that has been preserved is one of the saws, which has been restored to working order and can be seen at the Umeå Energi Klabböle kraftverk in the village of Klabböle, just across the Ume River from Baggböle.

After the heyday of the sawmill at Baggböle - from 1850 to 1880, with at its peak 170 workers in the mill - both the operations and some of the barracks for the workers were moved to a new steam-powered sawmill in Holmsund, the port at the mouth of the Ume River that the lumber was shipped from, while the sawmill and its associated buildings at Baggböle were abandoned. Except for this house which until 1958 was used by the manager of the local power plant.

== In the modern era ==
The manor and its approximately 340 hectares (840 acres) of land was donated to Umeå Missionsförsamling, a congregation within the Mission Covenant Church of Sweden, by the then owner, Svenska Cellulosa Aktiebolaget (the largest private owner of forest land in Europe), in 1968 - the same year the mansion was declared a heritage building - and the congregation had the building renovated in 1968-1971. For the next 35 years it was used by the congregation, who, primarily through voluntary work, also established the mansion as a popular summer cafe, making it a popular place to visit, not least for the annual celebration of Walpurgis Night. In 2006 the manor was bought by a private businessman, who started further renovations of the building, which is now used for business conferences and as a restaurant.
