= Norrforsen =

Rapids on the Ume River in Sweden

Coordinates: 63.8792°N 20.0250°E

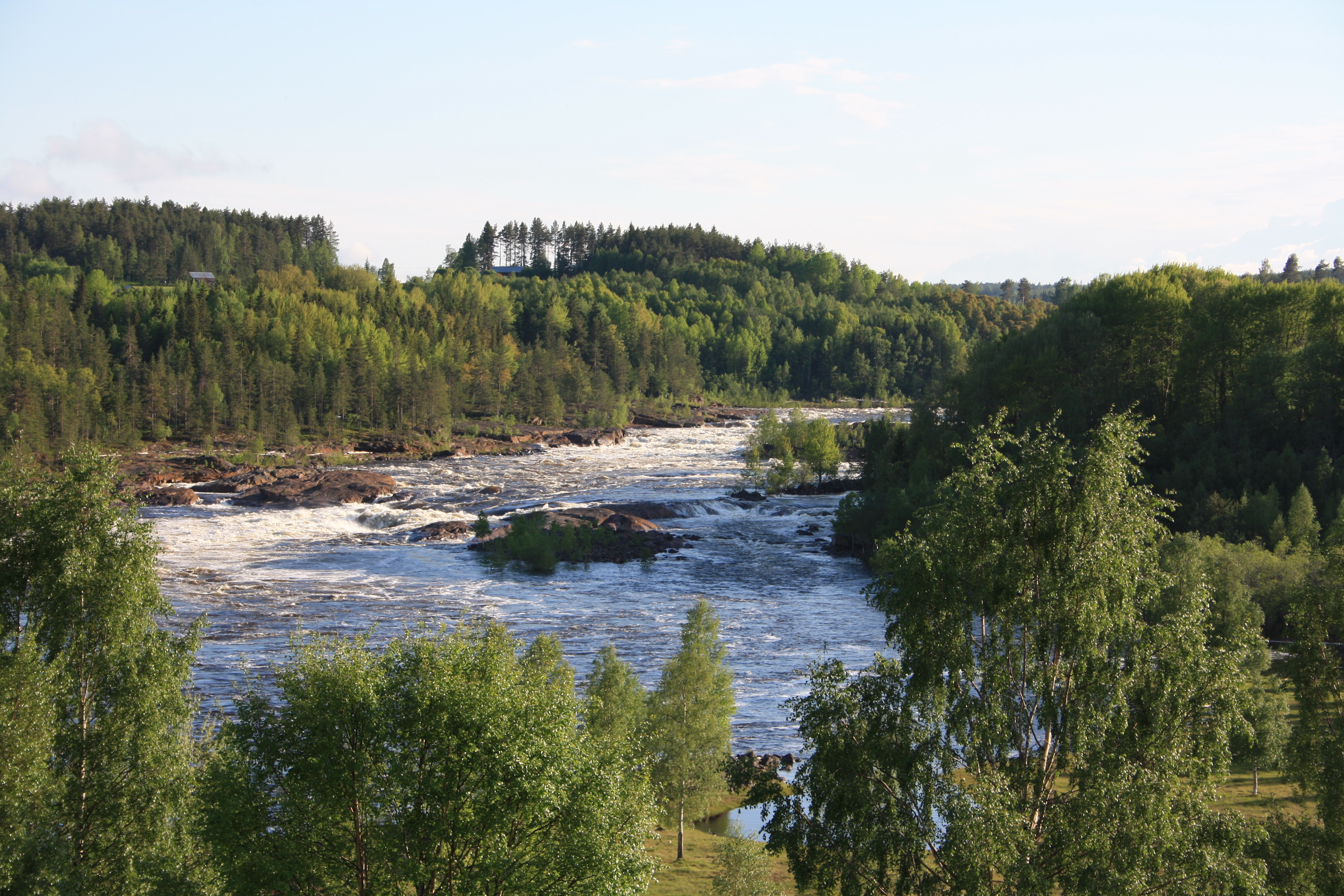
View of Norrforsen's landscape

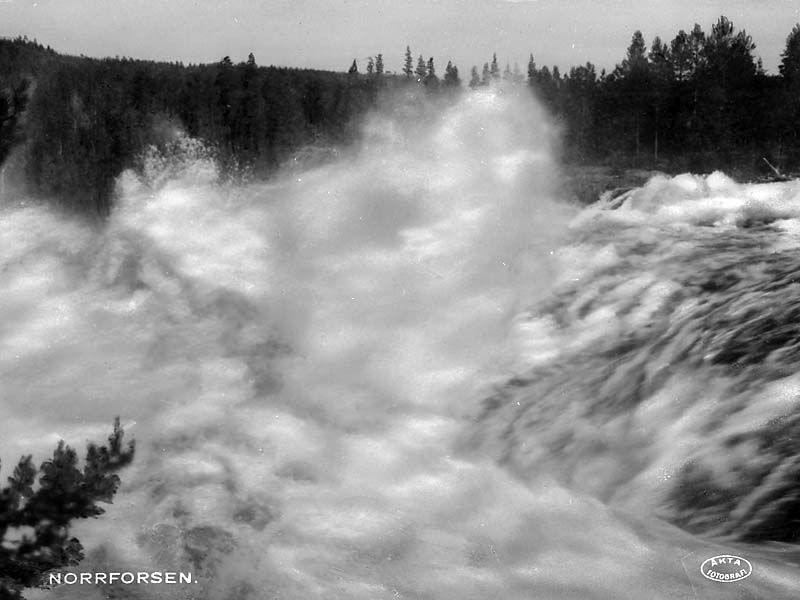
Postcard showing the rapids of Norrforsen, c. 1920

Norrforsen are rapids in the Ume River in Sweden, between the villages of Norrfors and Sörfors 15 kilometers west of Umeå. The rapids are located downriver from the dam of the hydroelectric power station at Stornorrfors.

At Truthällorna, an island that is underwater when the upriver dam gates are opened, are a number of ancient rock carvings. The petroglyphs are believed to have been carved by hunter-gatherer people between 3,000-2,000 BCE. The carvings were discovered in 1984 by a group of archaeology students from Umeå University.

The people made these carvings likely survived the winter in part by hunting moose (sv. älgar, also translated as elk). The majority of the carvings depict moose along with images of boats, a human figure, and unidentified fragment carvings. Note that these are petroglyphs (carvings) and not rock paintings; it is common to paint petroglyphs red in Scandinavia, to make them more visible.

Petroglyphs at Norrforsen on the Ume River
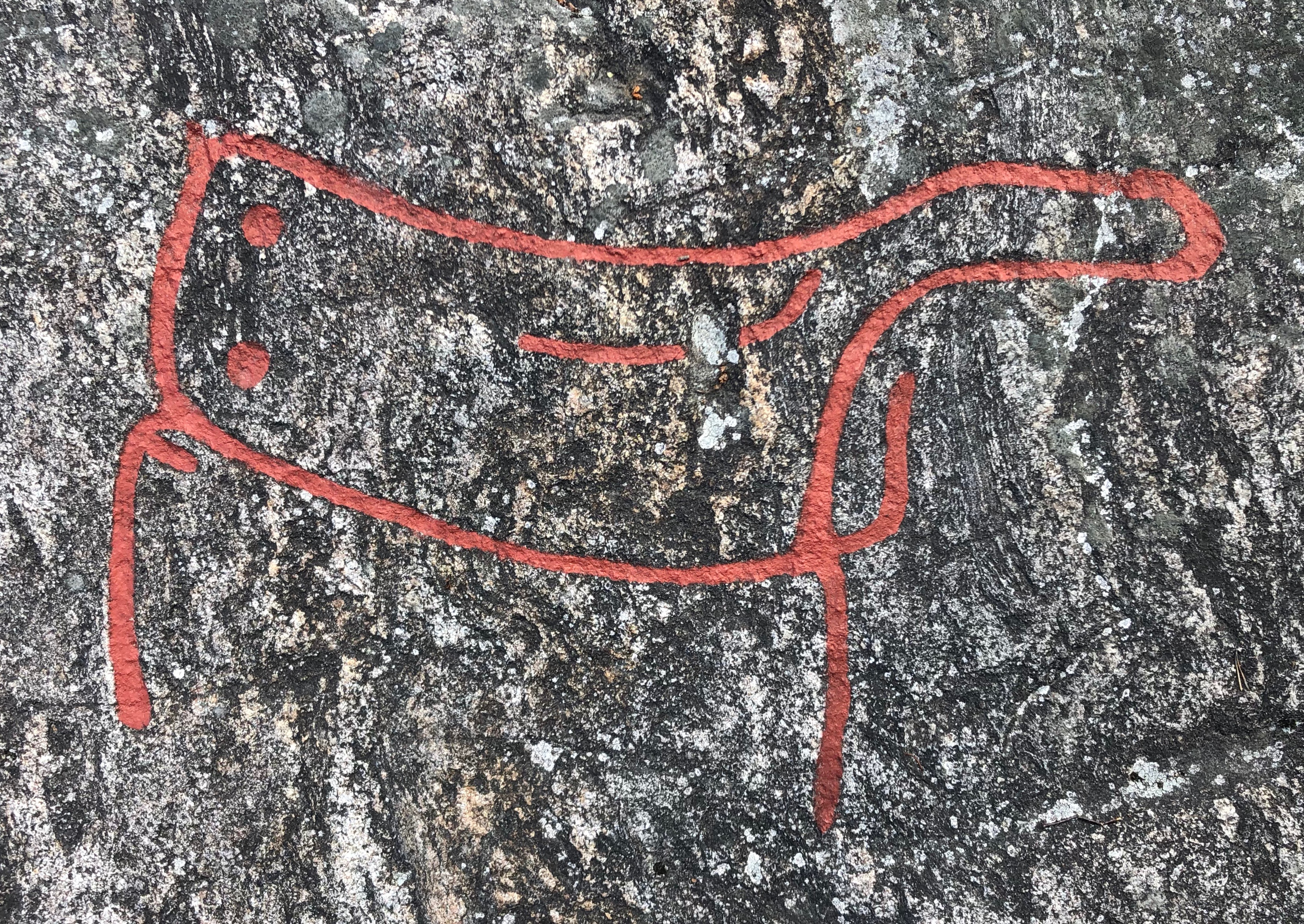
Depiction of a female moose

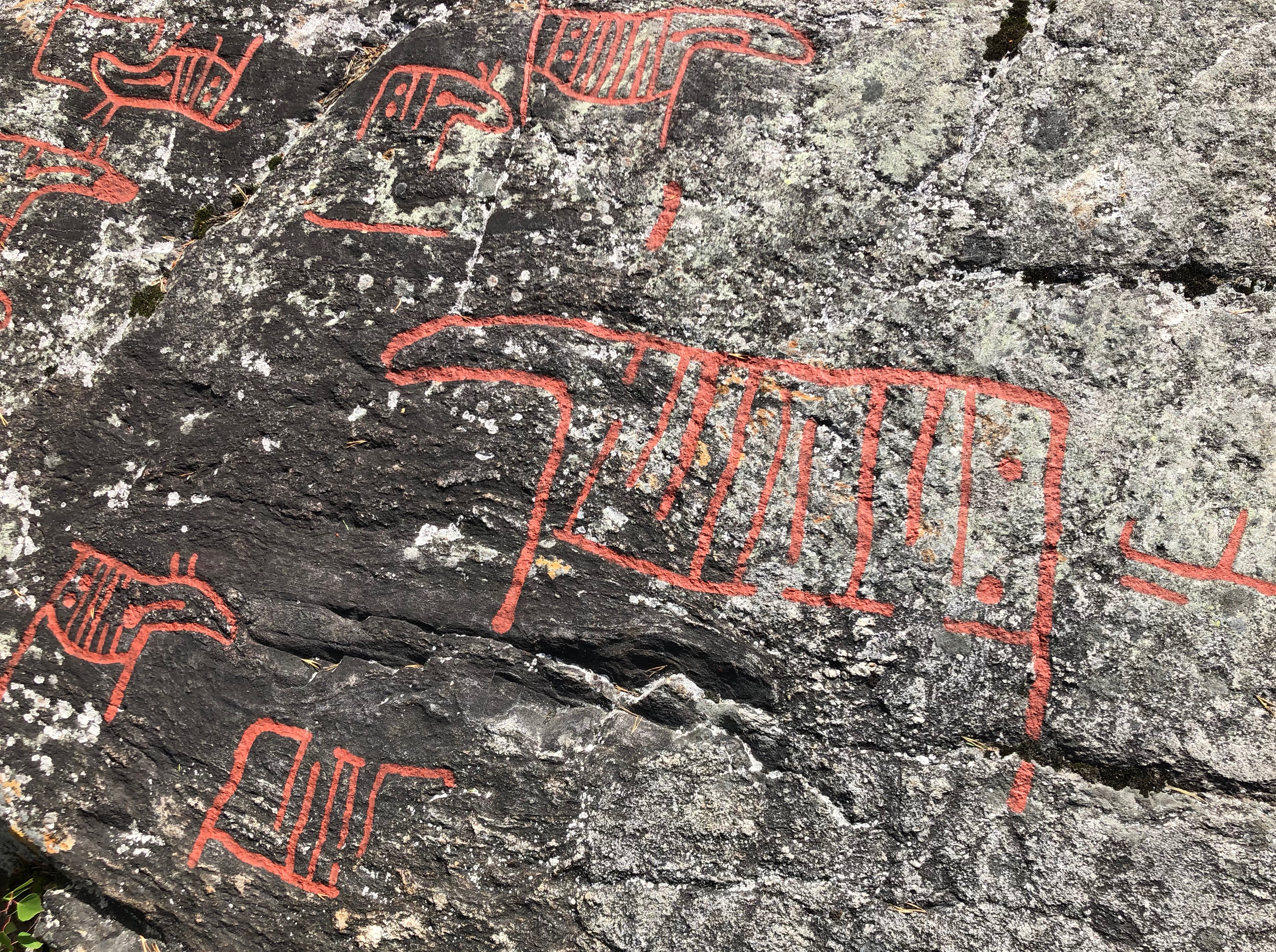
Depictions of moose

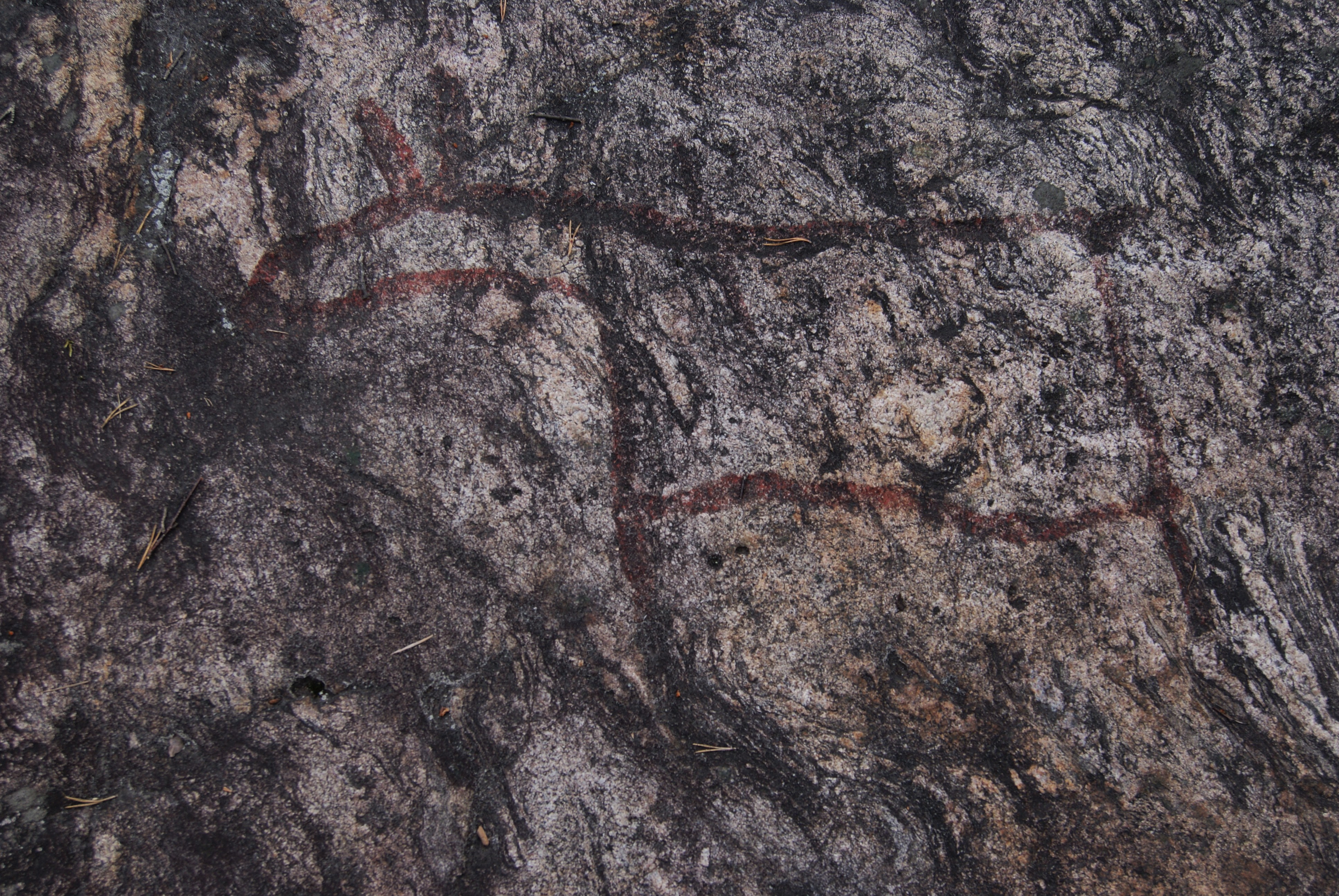
Depiction of a male moose

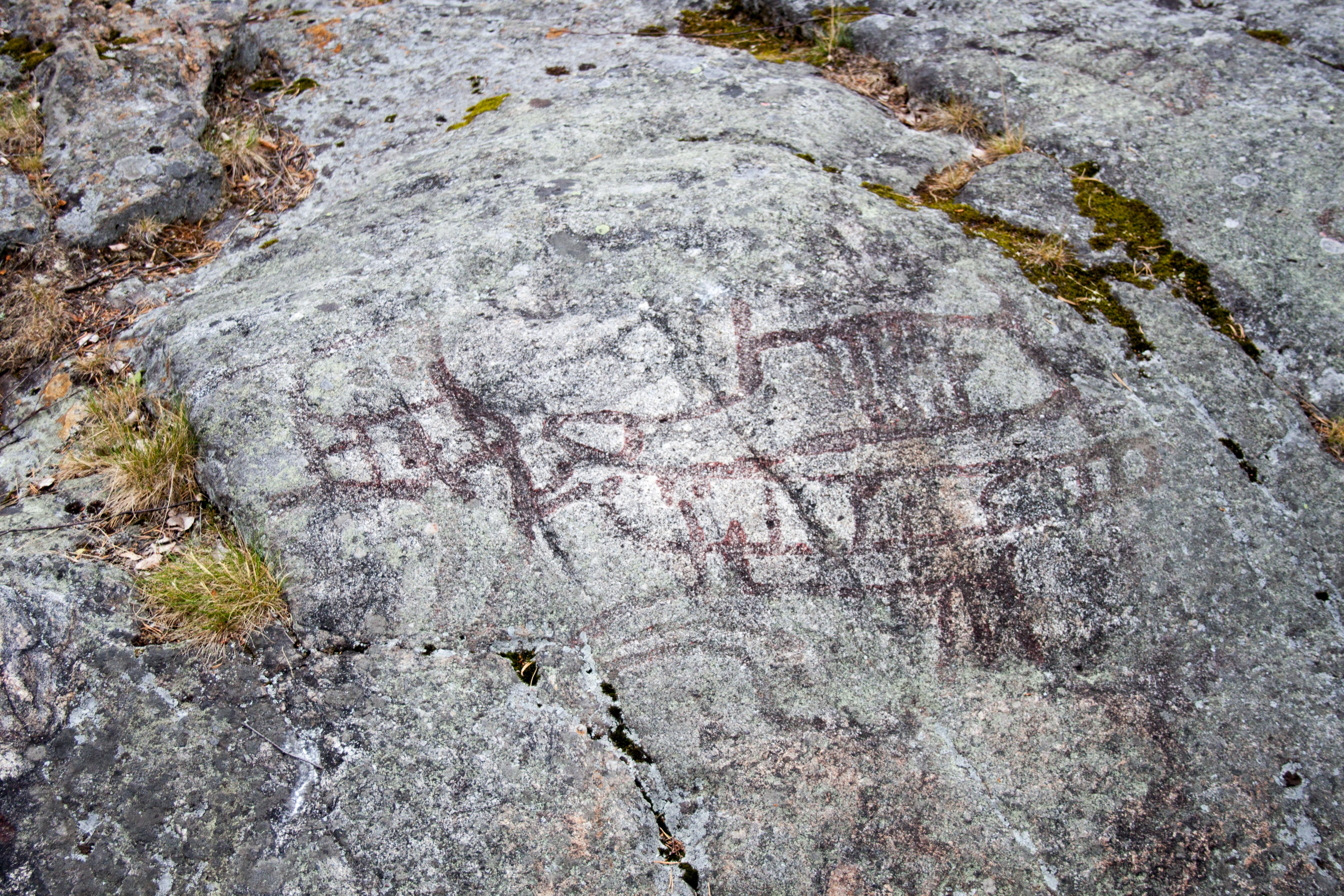
Rock carvings at Norrforsen

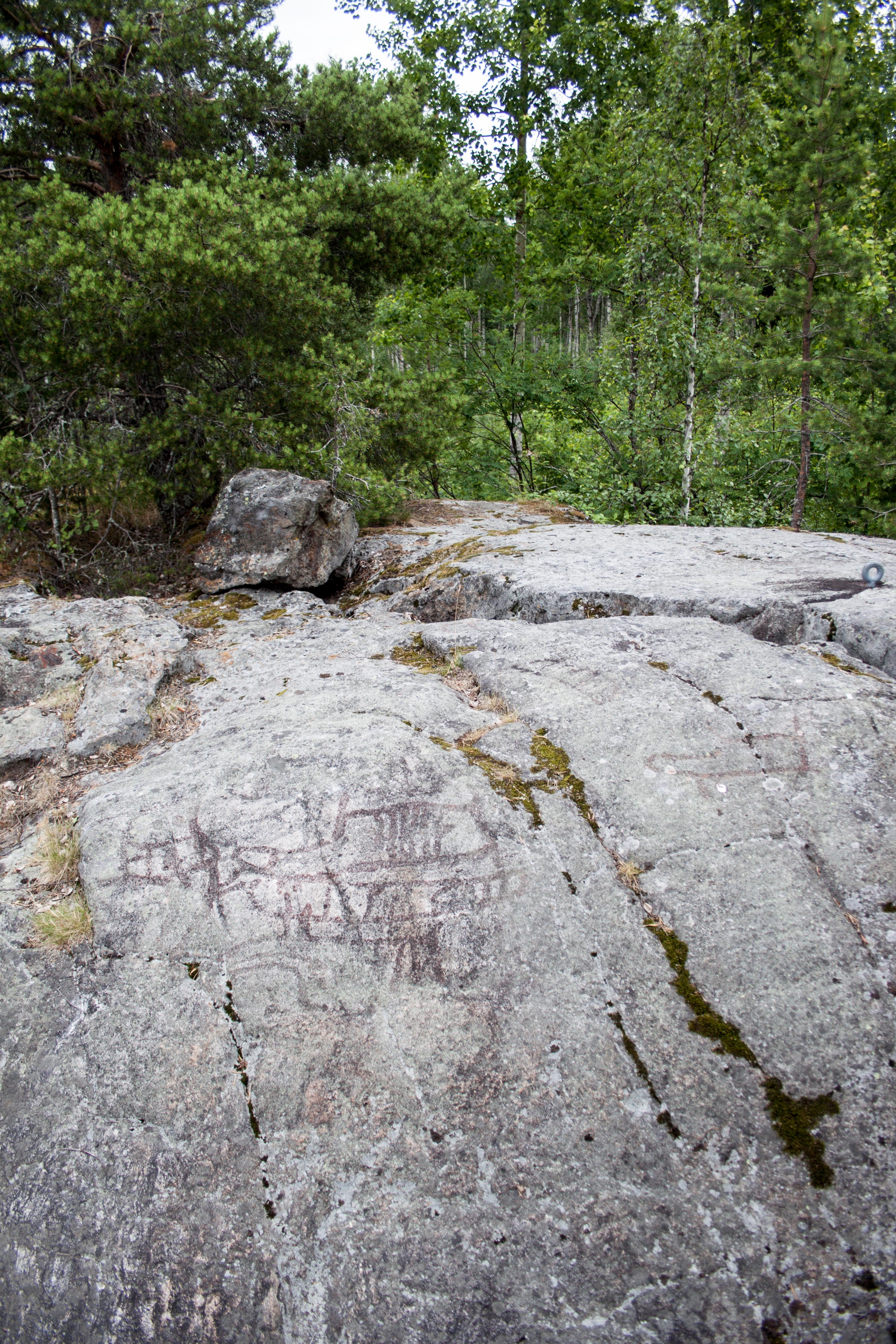
Archeological site of the petroglyphs.
