= Krångede Hydroelectric Power Station =

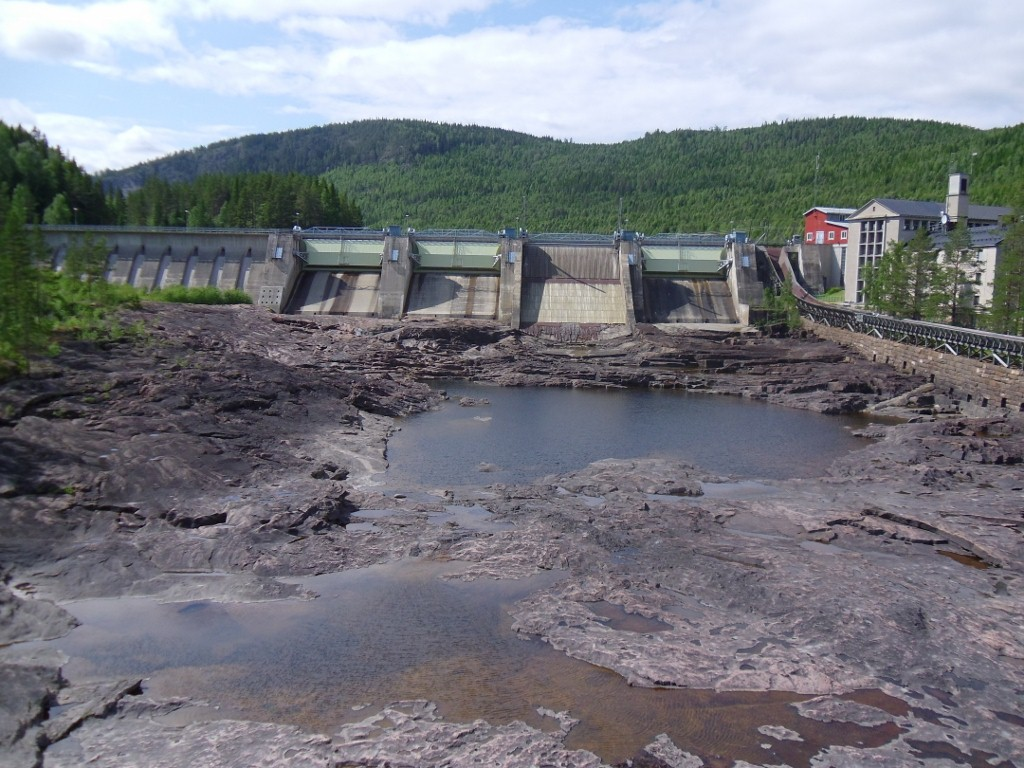

- Location within Sweden
- Official name: Krångede kraftverk
- Location: Jämtland County, Sweden
- Coordinates: 63.149238°N 16.071110°E
- Purpose: Power
- Status: Operational
- Construction began: 1931
- Opening date: 1936
- Owner: Fortum
- Operator: Fortum

Dam and spillways
- Type of dam: Concrete gravity dam
- Impounds: Indalsälven
- Spillway type: Over the dam

Power Station
- Commission date: 1936
- Hydraulic head: 60 m
- Turbines: 6 Francis turbines
- Installed capacity: 248.4 MW
- Annual generation: 1622.4 GWh

Krångede Hydroelectric Power Station (Swedish: Krångede kraftverk) is a run-of-the-river hydroelectric power plant on the Indalsälven in Jämtland County, Sweden. About 15 km downstream of Krångede is the urban area Hammarstrand.

Work on the power plant began in 1931. It was operational in 1936. Krångede power plant is owned by Fortum.

== Dam ==
Krångede Dam is a concrete gravity dam. The dam features a spillway with four gates over the dam, that is located in the middle.

== Power plant ==
The power plant contains six Francis turbine-generators. The total nameplate capacity is 248.4 MW. Its average annual generation is 1622.4 GWh. The hydraulic head is 60 m.

== See also ==
- List of hydroelectric power stations in Sweden
