= Vargfors Hydroelectric Power Station =

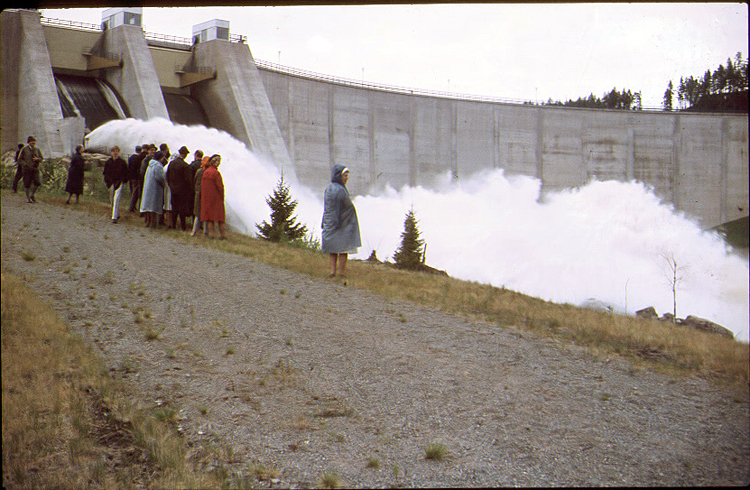

- Location within Sweden
- Official name: Vargfors kraftstation
- Location: Västerbotten County, Sweden
- Coordinates: 65.021708°N 19.685783°E
- Purpose: Power
- Status: Operational
- Opening date: 1961
- Owner: Vattenfall
- Operator: Vattenfall

Dam and spillways
- Type of dam: Concrete arch dam
- Impounds: Skellefte River

Power Station
- Commission date: 1961
- Hydraulic head: 49 m
- Turbines: 1 Francis- and 1 Kaplan turbine
- Installed capacity: 122 MW
- Annual generation: 452 GWh

Vargfors Hydroelectric Power Station (Swedish: Vargfors kraftstation) is a run-of-the-river hydroelectric power plant on the Skellefte River in Västerbotten County, Sweden. About 15 km southwest of Vargfors is the urban area Norsjö.

The power plant was operational in 1961. It is owned and operated by Vattenfall.

== Dam ==
Vargfors Dam consists of one concrete arch dam and two additional embankment dams.

== Power plant ==
The power plant contains 1 Francis- and 1 Kaplan turbine-generator. The total nameplate capacity is 122 MW. Its average annual generation is 452 GWh. The hydraulic head is 49 m. Maximum flow is 136 m³/s.

== See also ==
- List of hydroelectric power stations in Sweden
