= Höljes Hydroelectric Power Station =

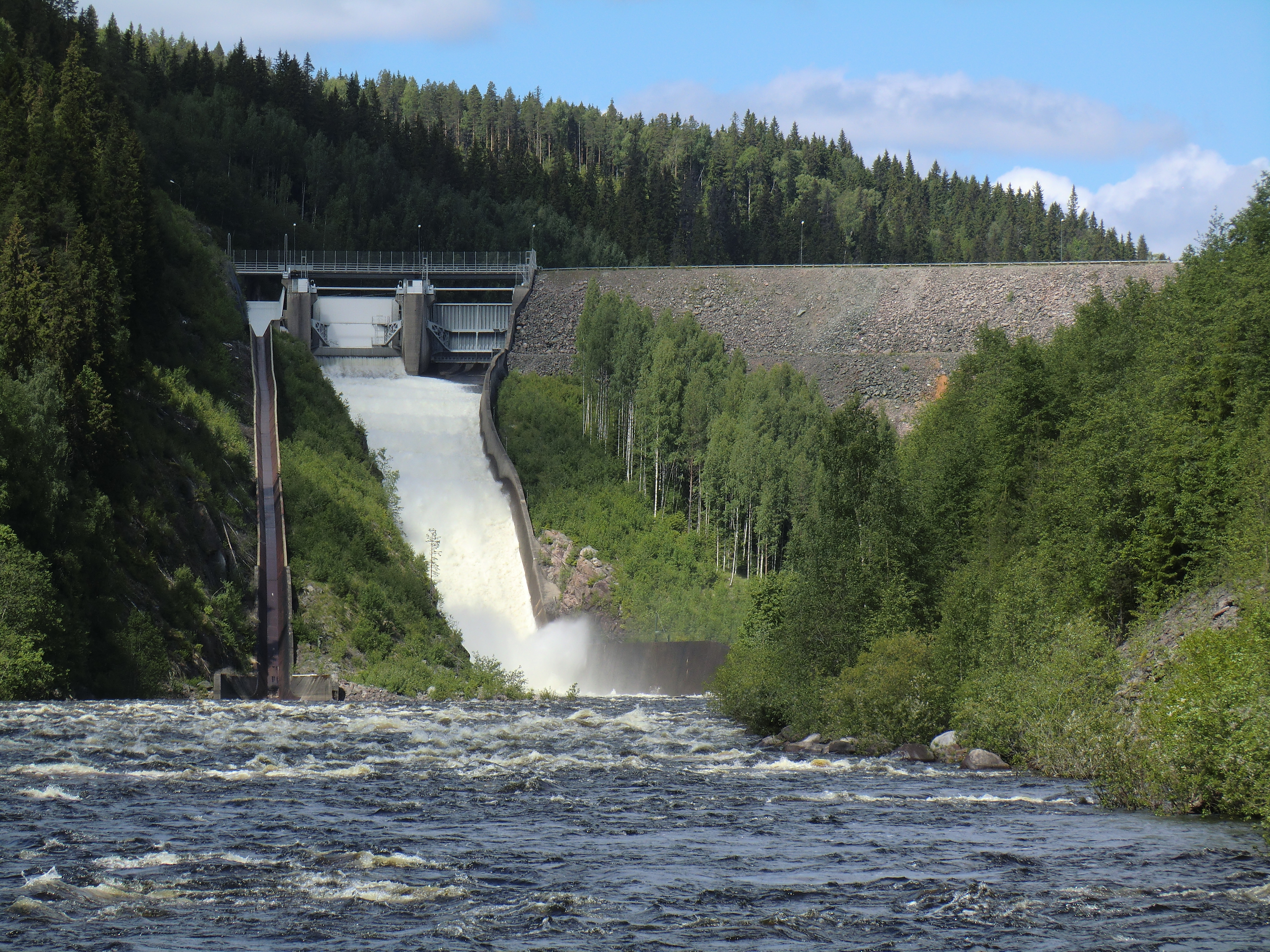

- Location within Sweden
- Official name: Höljes kraftverk
- Location: Torsby Municipality, Värmland County
- Coordinates: 60.951110°N 12.543211°E
- Purpose: Power
- Status: Operational
- Opening date: 1962
- Owner: Fortum
- Operator: Fortum

Dam and spillways
- Type of dam: Embankment dam
- Impounds: Klarälven

Power Station
- Commission date: 1962
- Hydraulic head: 88 m
- Turbines: 2 Francis turbines
- Installed capacity: 127.8 MW
- Annual generation: 533 GWh

Höljes Hydroelectric Power Station (Swedish: Höljes kraftverk) is a hydroelectric power plant on the Klarälven in Torsby Municipality, Värmland County, Sweden.

The power plant was operational in 1962. It is owned and operated by Fortum.

== Dam ==
Höljes Dam is an embankment dam with the spillway on the right side.

== Power plant ==
The power plant contains 2 Francis turbine-generators. The total nameplate capacity is 127.8 MW. Its average annual generation is 533 GWh. The hydraulic head is 88 m.

== See also ==
- List of hydroelectric power stations in Sweden
