= Baggböle =

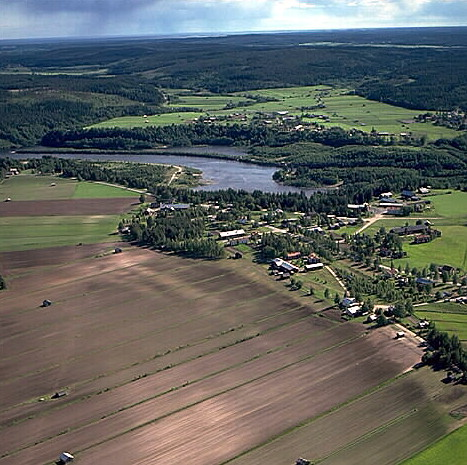

- Location within Västerbotten Location within Sweden
- Coordinates: 63°50′18″N 20°07′38″E
- Country: Sweden
- Province: Västerbotten
- County: Västerbotten County
- Municipality: Umeå Municipality
- Time zone: UTC+1 (CET)
  - Summer (DST): UTC+2 (CEST)

Baggböle is a small village on the Ume River in northern Sweden, approximately 8 km (5 mi) upstream of the city of Umeå. The village was a base for sawing local timber in the nineteenth century, with a sawmill powered by the water of the river rapids close to the village. The sawmill at Baggböle was abandoned towards the end of the 19th century, but was in its heyday the largest water-powered sawmill in Sweden. The operations at the sawmill resulted in a new word in Swedish, baggböleri, a term that originally meant illegal felling of timber in forests belonging to the Crown, but is now a pejorative term for 'reckless deforestation' (Swedish: skogsskövling). Today Baggböle is known for Arboretum Norr, an arboretum that has been developed to attract visitors, and develop plants suitable for northern latitudes.

== History ==
The original sawmill at Baggböle Rapids, which was built in 1813–14, stemmed from a partnership between Johan Unander, Eric Nyberg and Johan Vikner, who obtained permission to build a sawmill there.

The original business was bought by James Dickson & Co of Gothenburg, Sweden, a company started by Scottish-Swedish brothers James and Robert Dickson, who had built up a successful business in the province of Värmland, further south in Sweden, in the 1830s. After buying the business at Baggböle they had large new water-powered sawmills built at Baggböle, the first in 1842 and the second in 1850, sawmills that were the largest water-powered sawmills in Sweden. The Dickson sawmills employed 170 male seasonal workers during the ice-free part of the year, from May to October, each year, from the start of operations until the company moved to a new steam powered sawmill at Holmsund, the seaport at the mouth of the Ume River from where the lumber from the sawmill was exported, in the 1880s. Dickson also had a manor house built at Baggböle in 1846, as residence for the local manager of the mill. The house was designed by Johan Anders Linder to look as if it was made of stone, in spite of being built entirely of wood.

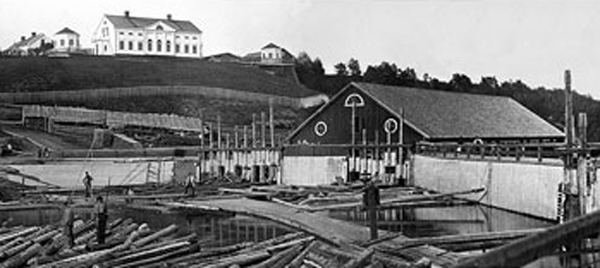
The Baggböle manor and the now demolished gazebos

The mills' impressive productivity was partially due to the owners' disregard for the law. During 1842–68, the locals, who delivered logs to the sawmill, felled more trees on land belonging to the Crown than they had permissions for. A reckless cutting of timber that through the press coverage of the resulting court cases became so infamous that a new word in the Swedish language was derived from the name of the village: baggböleri, a derogative term for reckless deforestation.

=== The court cases ===
The business methods of the sawmill owned and operated by James Dickson & Co became headline news in Sweden when the manager and director of the company, James Dickson Jr, was taken to court on 15 June 1850, accused of encouraging his suppliers upstream to supply him with logs that did not belong to them. Dickson's defence was that he did not know that a large part of the logs that the sawmill was processing belonged to the Crown. The Crown was, however, said to be well aware of the fact that much of the wealth the sawmill was creating for local residents and land owners, for which the local population was very grateful, came from illegal felling of timber on Crown land. By swearing to his honesty and his lack of knowledge of what had happened Dickson was able to escape a conviction, which was allowed under Swedish law at that time, in cases where all evidence was circumstantial.

James Dickson was fortunate in avoiding a conviction, because even if he personally had been unaware of it his company was guilty of receiving stolen goods, having, every year since 1842, taken in more than the 4,500 logs per annum from Crown forests than had been agreed.

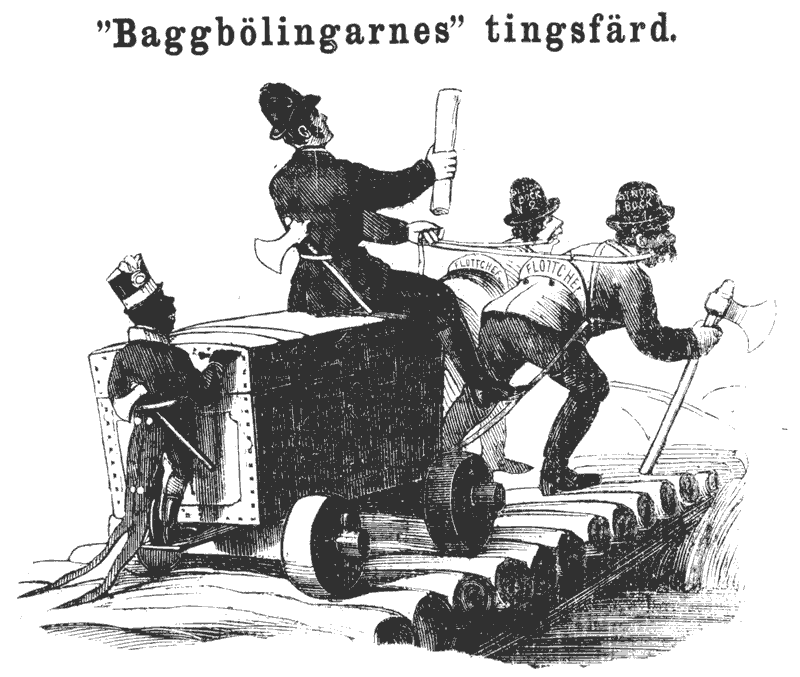
A satirical cartoon from 1867 features Oscar Dickson who was a manager at the time

The exploitation of Crown timber continued but in 1866-67 the company was again taken to court and this time they were obliged to agree to help prevent the use of Crown timber. This was the time when the company was featured in satirical cartoons and the term baggböleri was first seen in print. The rights to fell a certain quantity of timber on Crown land had been given to the farmers and the local villages, which in theory put them in a position of power, but since the only way for the farmers and villages to move logs at that time was by log driving, i.e. letting the current of the river move the logs downstream, the only viable purchaser was the sawmill at Baggböle; which since the sawmill set the price made it possible for the mill to exploit its suppliers. An exploitation that was also included in the meaning of the term baggböleri.

The sawmill was able to use its power to set the terms of logging contracts with local villages, contracts that through the nature of them, giving Baggböle sawmill exclusive rights to all timber felled on all forest land belonging to the villages for a period of 50 years, resulted in no one feeling responsible for, or being interested in, replanting clear-cut areas. Which caused deforestation, so in the 1880s the sawmills had to be prevented from signing such contracts in order to stop further damage. The sawmills also used their power over their suppliers to buy their land, with the sawmills in some areas buying more than half of all land. In that exploitation the Baggböle sawmill wasn't the worst offender, though, and in fact didn't start to invest in real estate until after the sawmill closed.

=== The end of the sawmill era ===
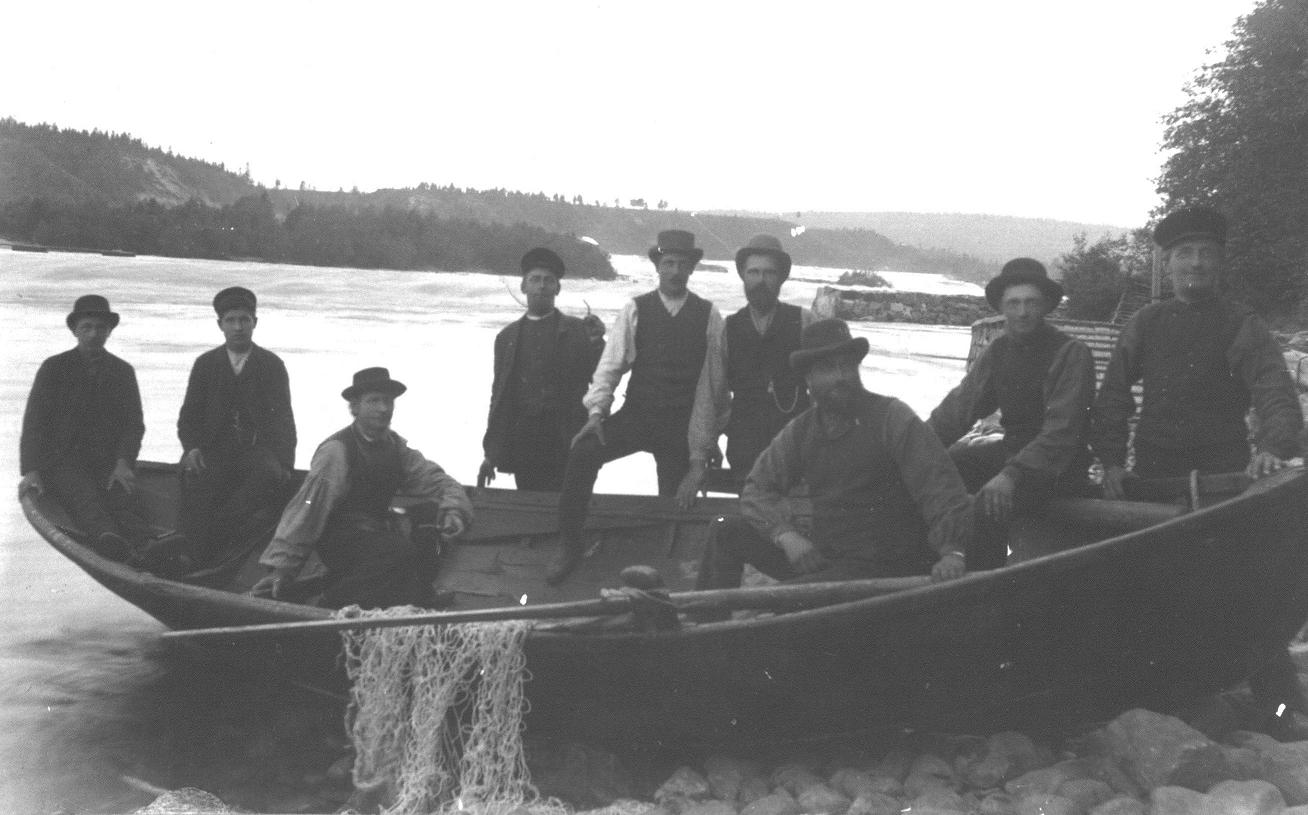
Fishing near Baggböle in the late 19th century

The sawmill came under threat when steam power was introduced at Tunadal, further south along Sweden's Baltic coast, in 1849, followed by an additional twenty steam powered sawmills in Sweden within a decade. The new steam powered sawmills were usually placed near the seaports from where the lumber was shipped, forcing the old water-powered sawmills, which by necessity had been positioned at rapids a bit up the rivers, to close. The water-powered sawmill at Baggböle closed in 1884, as one of the last in Sweden, when a new steam powered sawmill was opened in Holmsund, the seaport at the mouth of the Ume River. After the sawmill at Baggböle closed the facility changed hands a number of times, and there was a plan to build a pulp mill there at the end of the nineteenth century, plans that were ultimately abandoned. Instead a hydro-electric powerplant was constructed at the Baggböle Rapids in 1899, in order to provide electricity for the city of Umeå, replacing a local steam powered plant. In 1916-17 a new power plant was built at Baggböle, which supplied electricity at 40,000 volts, mainly to a pulp mill at Obbola, across the mouth of the Ume River from Holmsund, approximately 26 km (16 mi) from Baggböle. This power plant was eventually sold to the city of Umeå in 1947. The hydro-electric power plant at Baggböle was demolished in 1958 when a new substantially larger power plant was opened at Stornorrfors, only about 7 km (4.3 mi) up the Ume River from Baggböle.

Today the land formerly used by Baggböle sawmill is Arboretum Norr, an arboretum that has been developed to attract visitors, and develop plants suitable for northern latitudes, while the manor, which originally served as residence for the manager of the sawmill at Baggböle and became a historically listed/graded building in 1964, is used for business conferences and as a restaurant.

== Notes ==
1. "Baggböleri, skogsskövling, olovlig skogsavverkning. Uttrycket kommer av Baggböle, ett sågverk i Västerbotten, vilket på 1860-talet anklagades för olovlig skogsavverkning på Kronans mark."
