= Älvkarleby Hydroelectric Power Station =

Powerplant in Sweden

Coordinates: 60°33′49.25″N 17°26′31.38″E

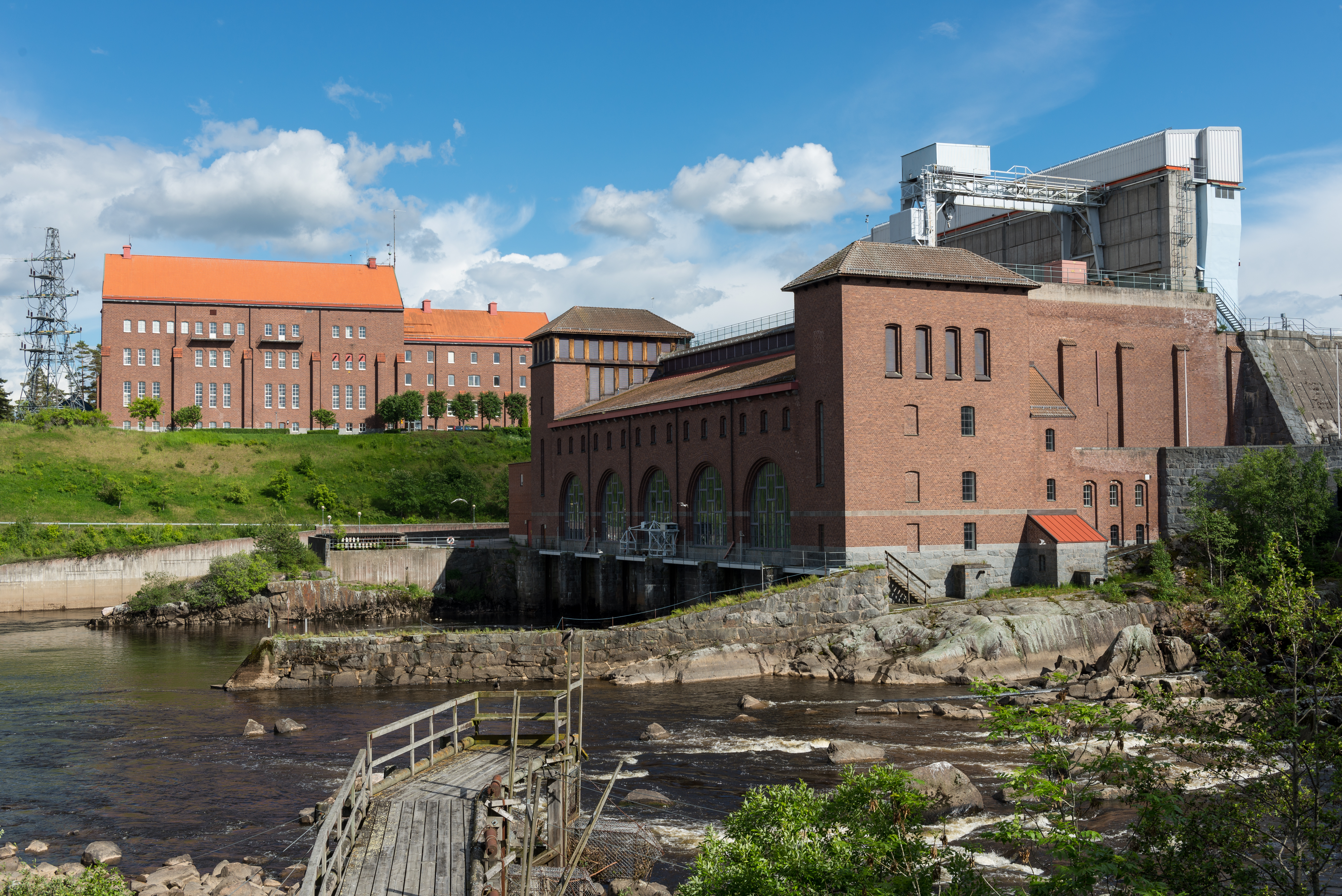
Älvkarleby Hydroelectric Power Station

Älvkarleby Hydroelectric Power Plant (Swedish: Älvkarleby kraftverk) is a hydroelectric power plant with 5 Francis turbines at Älvkarleby, Sweden. It was built in 1911. From 1988 to 1991 a new power plant with a single Francis turbine was added, increasing its generation power from 70 MW to 126 MW.

The national energy utility, the Vattenfall, produces 45% of Sweden's hydroelectric power at the Älvkarleby plant and almost 60 others.

== See also ==
- List of hydroelectric power stations in Sweden
- Energy law
