= Umeå Folk High School =

School in Umeå, Sweden

Coordinates: 64.0445°N 20.8568°E

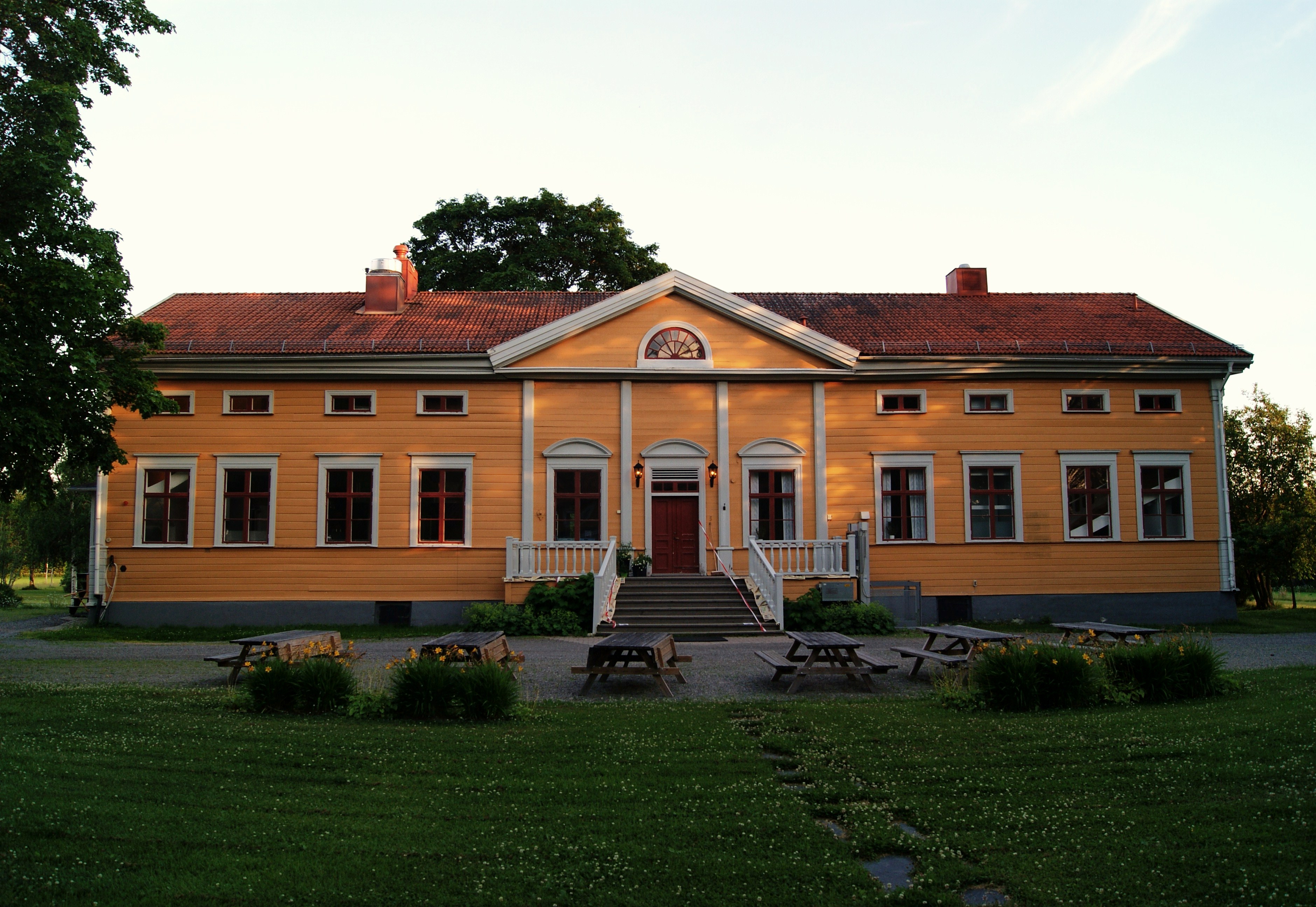
Main building at the Umeå Folk High School

Umeå Folk High School (Swedish: Umeå folkhögskola), previously Dalkarlså Folk High School, is situated in Umeå in northern Sweden. It is run by the Swedish Pentecostal churches.

Today the main campus is located in Ålidhem, Umeå, with branches in Lycksele and Örnsköldsvik.

Until autumn 2018, the school was partly housed in Dalkarlså Manor, whose buildings were added in 1817 and 1845. Dalkarlså Manor was the home of the Häggströmska Trading House, one of Västerbotten's leading employers in the mid-19th century. The manor became a listed building in 1985.

One of the school's buildings housed the Dalkarlså Lanthandelsmuseum, which is a country trading post from the 1850s.

In October 2018, it was reported that the folk high school would move its entire operations to Ålidhem in Umeå, where it already had a branch with 180 students.

== History ==
The main building of the school was constructed during a sawmill boom period. It was designed by Johan Anders Linder, who was a clergyman in Umeå. It was built in 1849.

The school is one of 154 folk high schools throughout Sweden. It offers a standard high school education that readies students for work or a university education, and in addition it offers specialist courses for musicians. Since 2013 the folk high school has expanded to other locations, also providing training in Swedish for immigrants.
