= Obbolaön =

Island in Sweden

- Interactive map of Obbolaön

Geography
- Location: Ume River
- Coordinates: 63°42′N 20°18′E
- Area: 23.71 km^{2} (9.15 sq mi)

Administration
- Sweden
- County: Västerbotten
- Municipality: Umeå

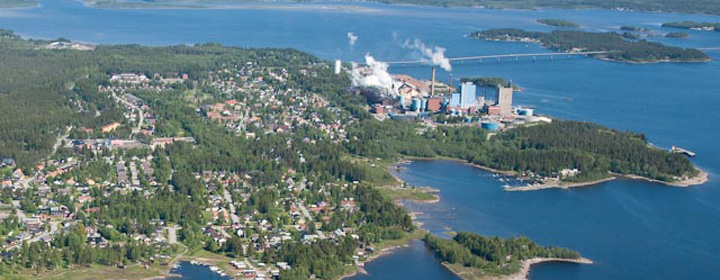
Obbola

Obbolaön is an island in northern Sweden. It lies in the Ume River, where it flows out in the Baltic Sea.
