= Klabböle Power Plant =

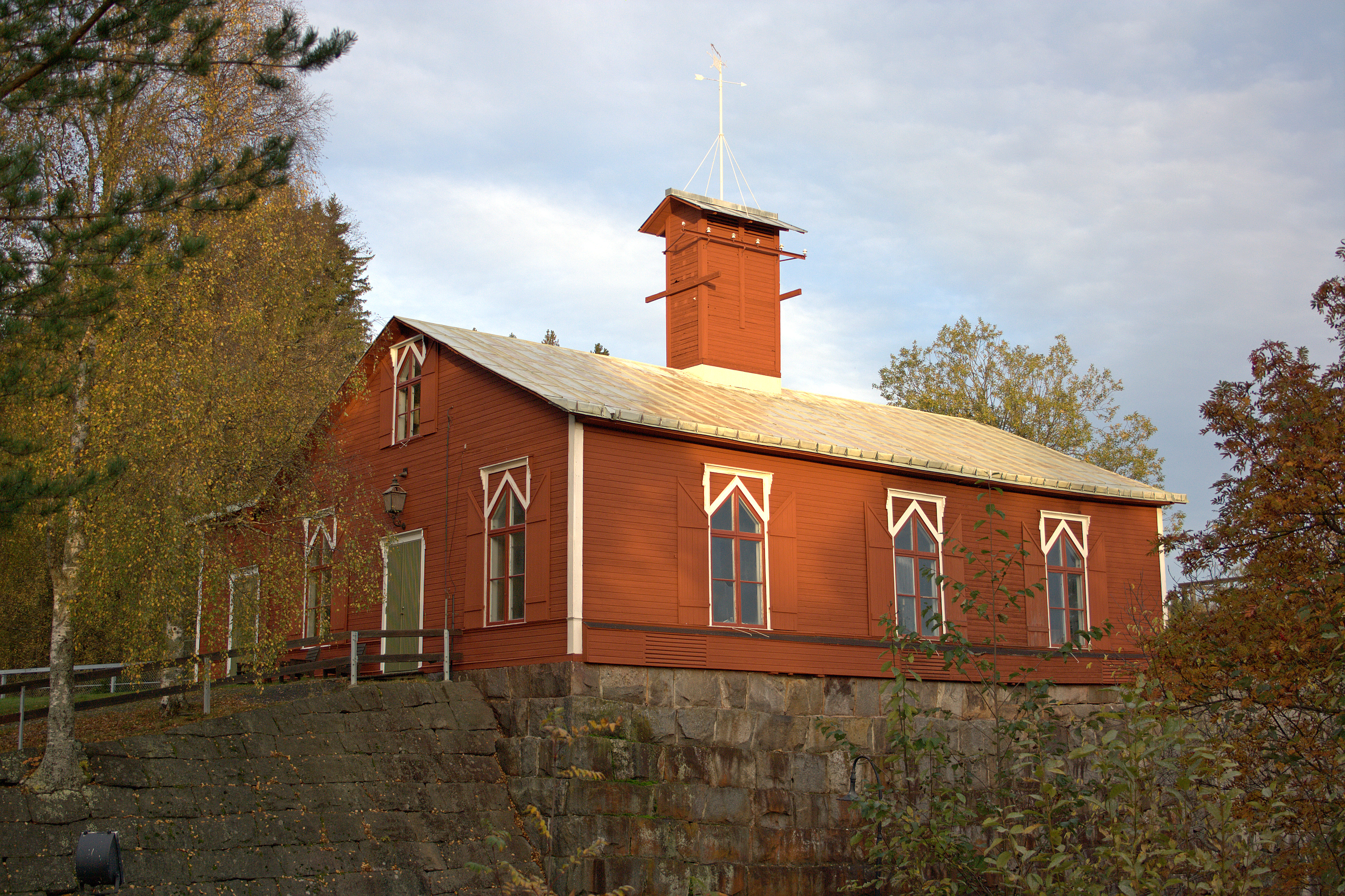
- Klabböle Power Plant (2011)

- Location within Sweden
- Official name: Klabböle kraftverk
- Country: Sweden
- Location: Umeå
- Coordinates: 63°50′7.78″N 20°7′0.26″E
- Opening date: 1899

Dam and spillways
- Impounds: Ume River

Power Station
- Commission date: 1899, 1904
- Decommission date: 1958
- Turbines: 3 x 200 kW
- Installed capacity: 993 MWh (1909)

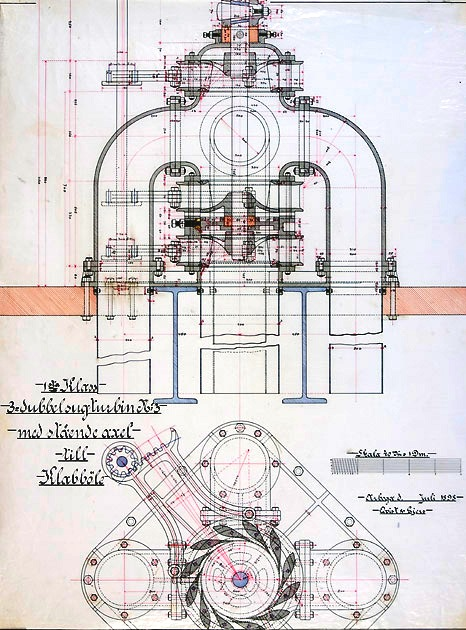
Drawing of the turbine used in the power plant, by Qvist & Gjers

Klabböle Power Plant (Swedish: Klabböle Kraftverk) was a hydroelectric plant located near Umeå in northern Sweden. The plant was commissioned in 1899 and supplied power to the city until 1958, when it was replaced by a newly constructed state-owned power plant in Norrforsen. Klabböle Kraftverk is now a museum located at Ume River's south bank, below the village of Klabböle, about 7 kilometres (4.3 mi) upstream from Umeå.

== History ==
In the 1500s, there was a water mill in Klabböleforsen which was used for grinding flour and for powering a saw. A steam-powered plant was located in the centre of Umeå, but by 1892 it needed to be replaced and the city agreed to use the rapids to build a hydroelectric plant in 1897. The work was subcontracted to the Qvist & Gjers engineering company in Arboga. Qvist & Gjers designed, engineered, and built the plant with two turbine-generator units totaling 400 kW, along with extra space for two more should they be needed in the future.

Due to financial constraints and the so-called kungsådra (an old law preventing part of the waterways from being blocked), the whole stream was not dammed. Instead, a diverter was built which created a watercourse for the power plant. The plant supplied power to Umeå for the first time on 6 December 1899. After a few weeks, problems arose due to slush, something that became a recurring problem. This was due to the plant's location at the lower part of the stream, between Norrfors and Klabböle, where the water cools off to the point that it becomes supercooled.

Initially, the plant utilized only 10 cubic meters per second of the river's average discharge of 430 cubic meters per second. To increase capacity, the power plant was expanded in 1904 with a third unit of 200 kW. Axel Rudolf Bergman then built a new plant of brick and concrete next to the old one. This new plant was completed on May 28, 1910, and a smaller expansion was added in 1914. Meanwhile, the Umeå municipality wanted the state-owned company Vattenfall to start constructing a power plant in Norrforsen, which they were told would happen. However, during and after World War I, there were no financial resources available for this project, so Klabböle was expanded again in 1931. Finally, in 1958, the state-owned Stornorrfors Hydroelectric Power Station was inaugurated in Norrforsen. With this new facility in place, the newer expansions of the Klabböle power plant were demolished. The older machinery was retained and has been incorporated into a power plant museum, as part of the Umeå Energy Centre.
