= Stornorrfors Hydroelectric Power Station =

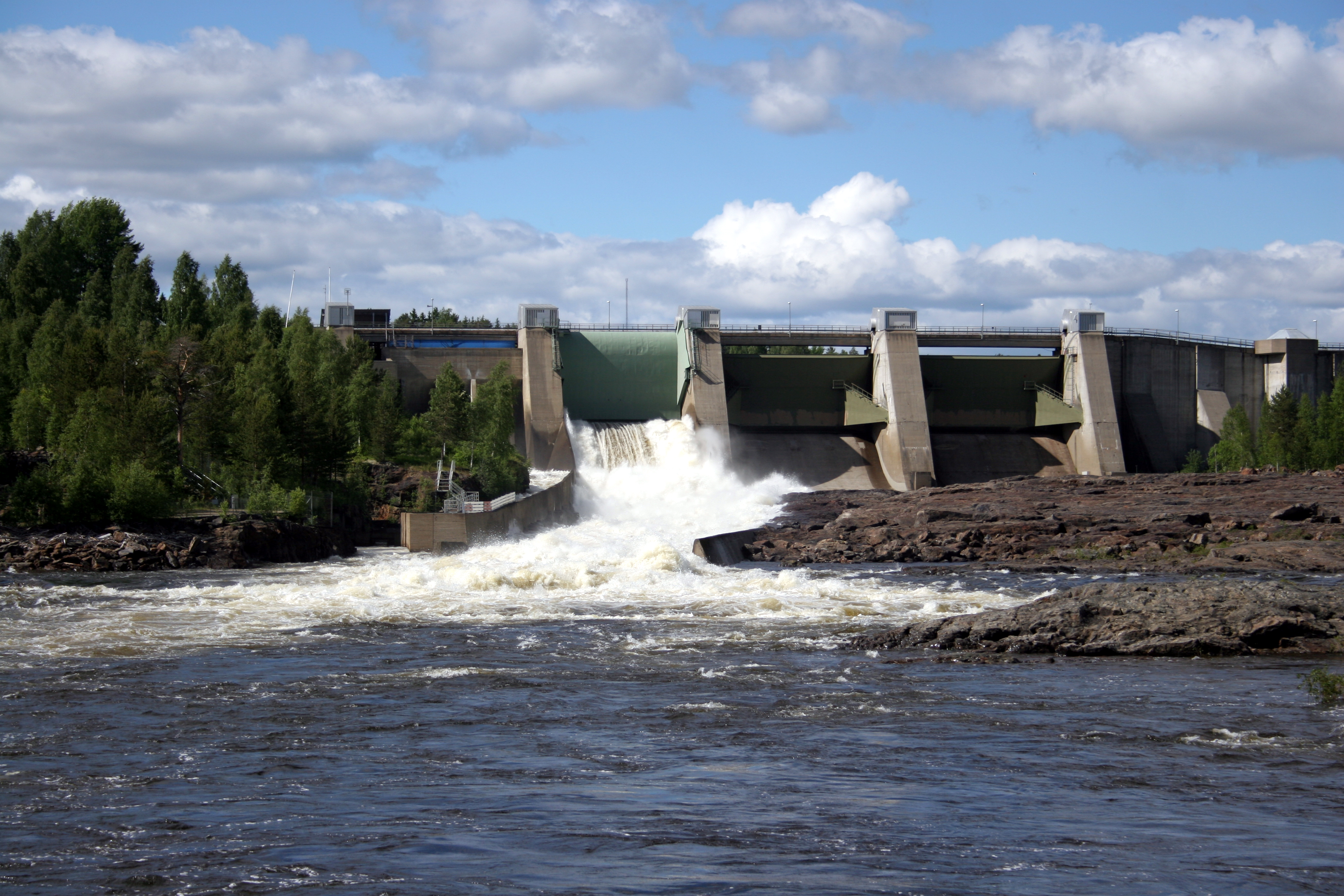

- Location within Sweden
- Official name: Stornorrfors kraftverk
- Location: Västerbotten County
- Coordinates: 63.852434°N 20.050435°E
- Purpose: Power
- Status: Operational
- Opening date: 1958
- Owner: Vattenfall
- Operator: Vattenfall

Dam and spillways
- Type of dam: Concrete gravity dam
- Impounds: Ume River

Power Station
- Commission date: 1958
- Hydraulic head: 75 m
- Turbines: 5 Francis turbines
- Installed capacity: 599.4 MW
- Annual generation: 2,256 GWh

Stornorrfors Hydroelectric Power Station (Swedish: Stornorrfors kraftverk) is a hydroelectric power station on the Ume River in Västerbotten County, Sweden. The city of Umeå lies about 15 km southeast of the power station.

Prior to the construction of Stornorrfors, the Klabböle Power Plant supplied power to the city of Umeå several kilometers downstream from Stornorrfors. Klabböle's power plant was commissioned in 1899, and supplied power to the city until 1958, when Stornorrfors began operating.

Stornorrfors is owned by Vattenfall (75 %; municipality of Umeå 25 %) and operated by Vattenfall. It generates more electricity per year than any other hydroelectric power plant in Sweden and is the country's second largest by nameplate capacity, after Harsprånget.

== Dam ==
Stornorrfors Dam is a concrete gravity dam located about 4 km from the power station. A canal connects the reservoir with the power station.

== Power station ==
The power station contains 4 (or 5) Francis turbine-generators. The total nameplate capacity is 599.4 MW. Its average annual generation is 2,256 GWh. The hydraulic head is 75 m. Maximum flow is 975 m³/s.

The first 3 machines with 131 MW each went on line in 1958. The turbines were manufactured by NOHAB.

The fourth turbine with 187 MW was commissioned in 1982. The turbine was manufactured by Kværner.

Norrfors Power Station in 1962
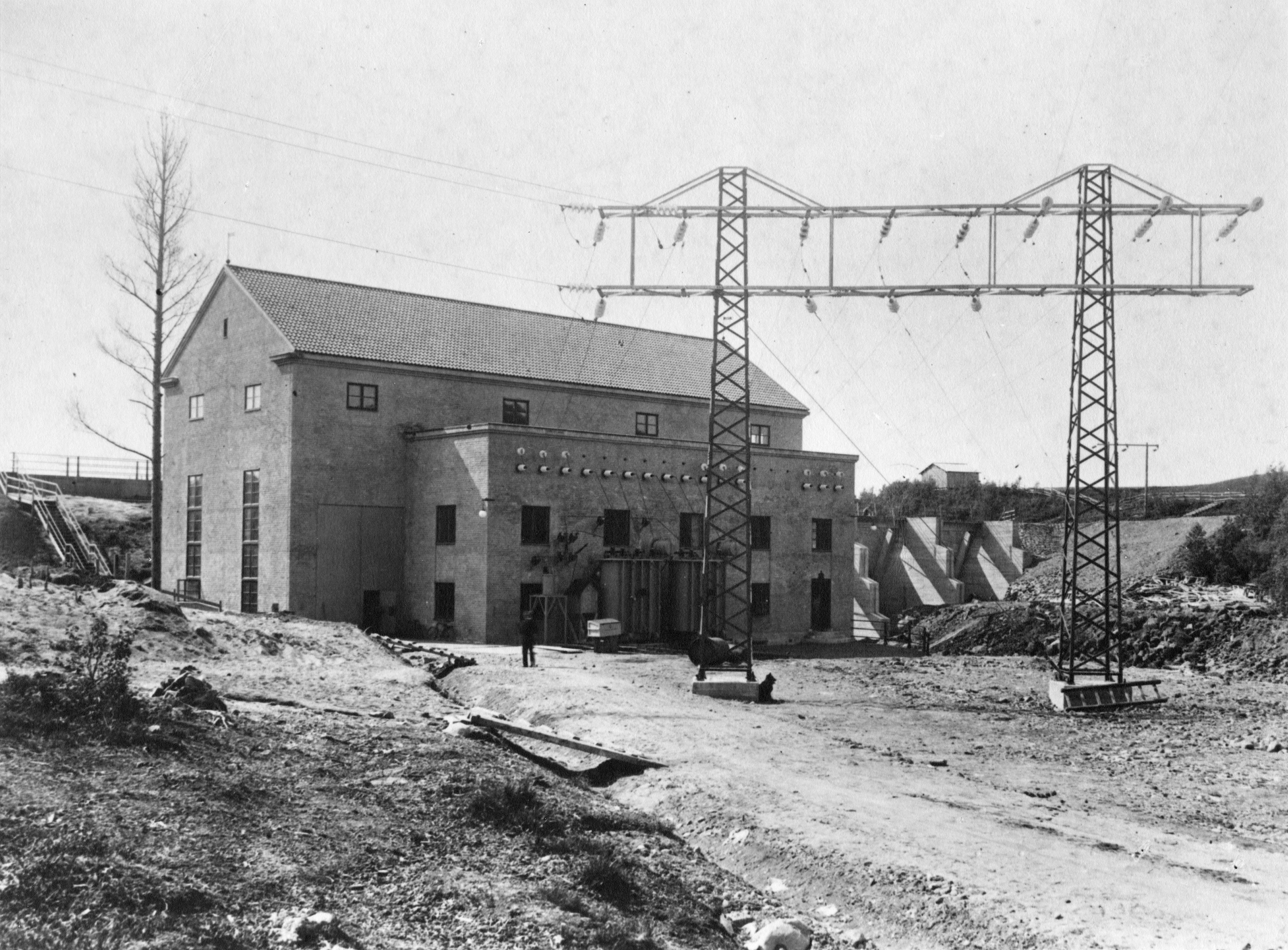
Exterior of power station

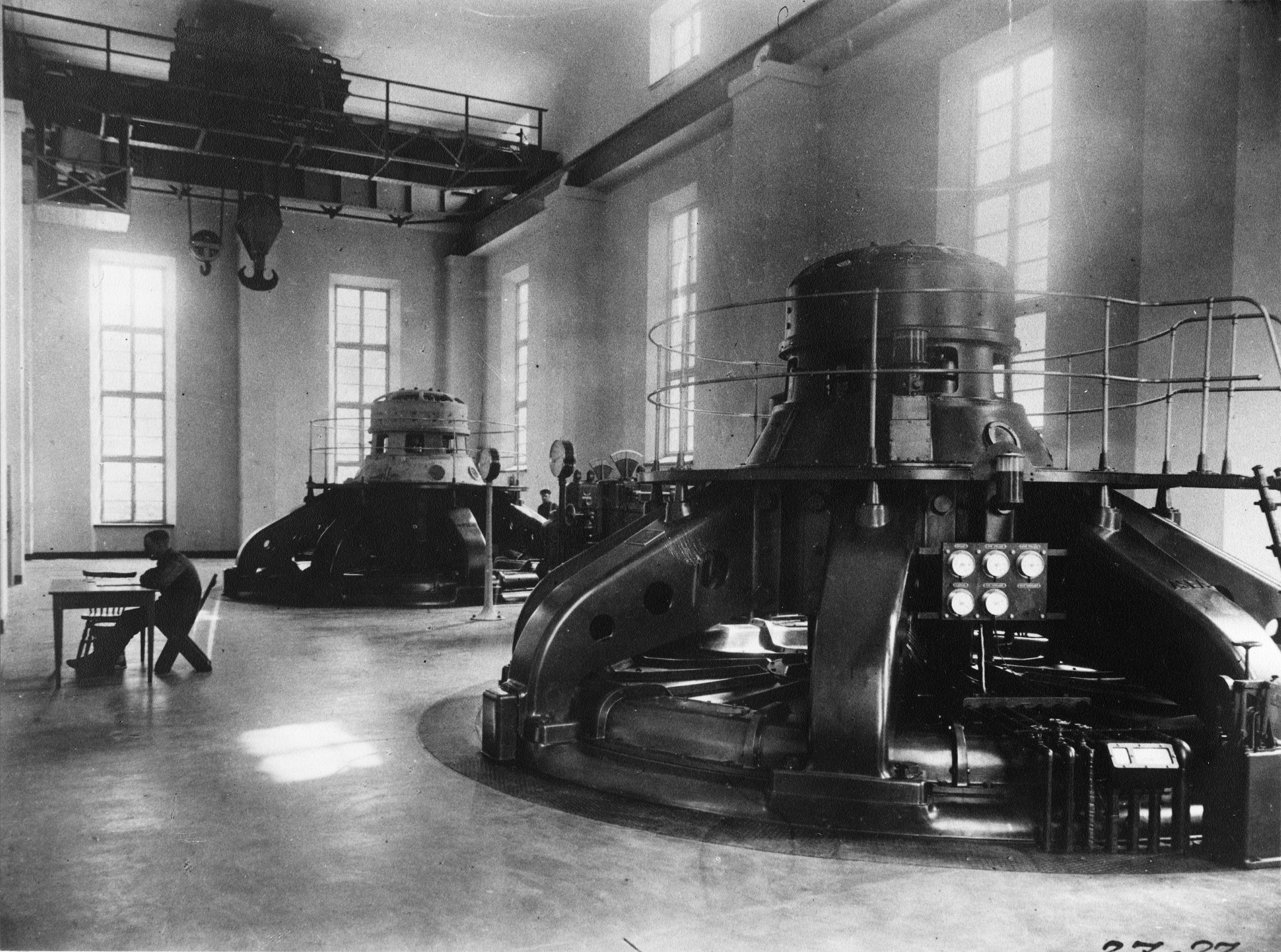
Interior of power station

== See also ==
- List of hydroelectric power stations in Sweden
