= Johan Anders Linder =

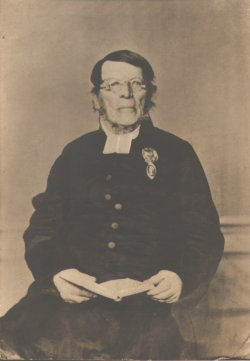
- Born: 20 November 1783; Bygdeå församling
- Died: 1 January 1877 (aged 93); Umeå parish

Johan Anders Linder (20 November 1783 – 1 January 1877) was a Swedish clergyman who was also an artist, a writer and an architect in Umeå.

== Life ==
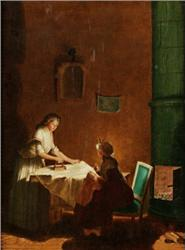
Johan Anders LinderJ- painting Gustaviansk interiör med arbetande kvinnor

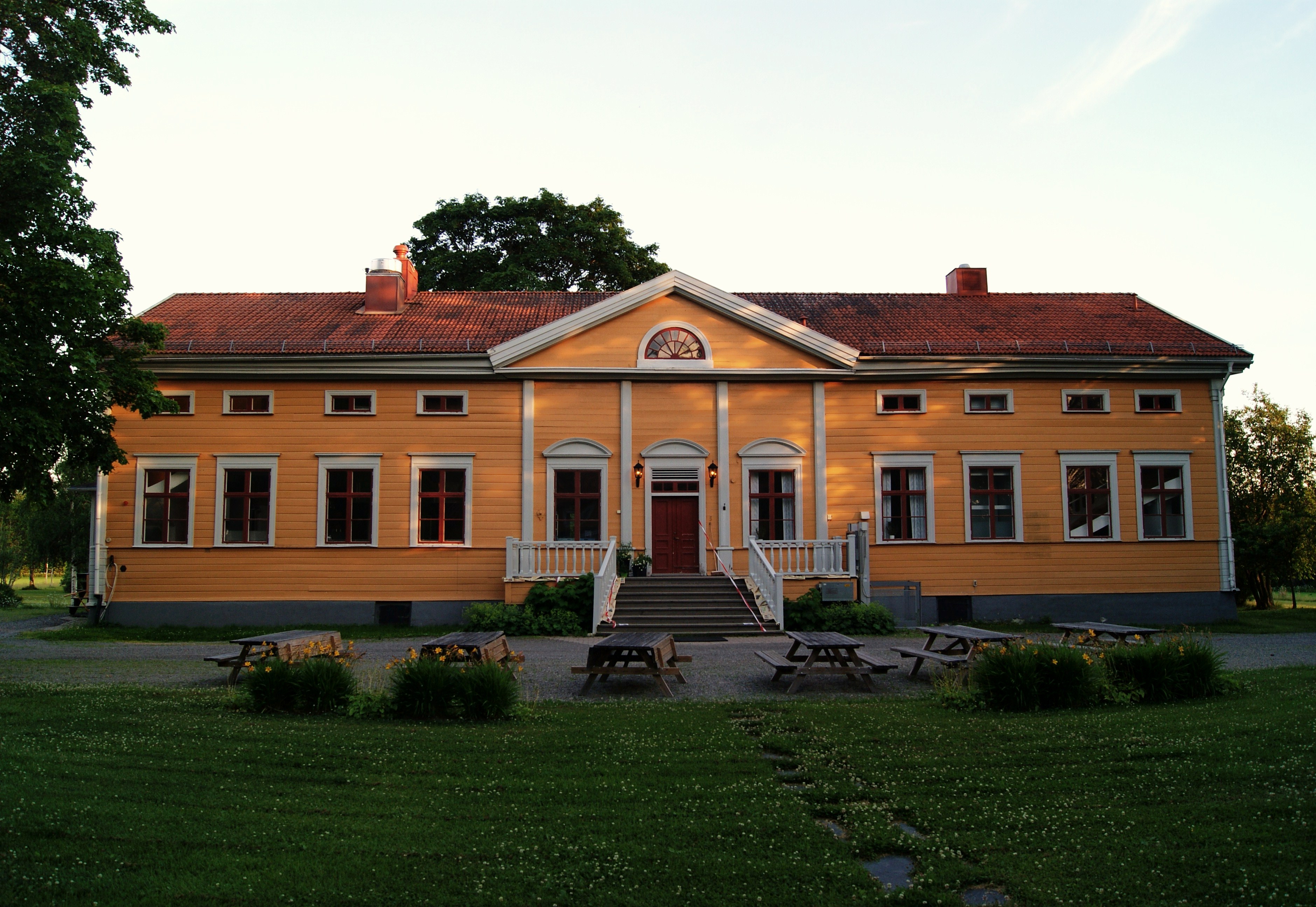
Manor at Umeå Folk High School

Linder was born in Bygdeå on 20 November 1783. His father died and his mother brought him up to be a minister. He obtained his first position in Umeå as a minister in northern Sweden in 1811. Linder and his wife were involved in the social life of the town where they lived and Linder also obtained work as an architect. Linder was also an accomplished artist. Baggböle manor, which he designed in 1846 as residence for the managing director of the water powered sawmill at Baggböle, is a wooden building made to look like a stone mansion.

Linder obtained other commissions in the 1840s and 1850s for more buildings. The mansion he had built in 1846 was made a listed building in 1964. The former manager's mansion is now near an arboretum and the house is used for conferences and as a restaurant.

Linder later designed a similar mansion to the one he designed at Baggböle saw mill but at Dalkarlså Folk High School (now Umeå Folk High School) in 1849.

Linder was also a writer, and a series of essays he wrote entitled On Swedish Lapp Territories and Their Inhabitants recorded some important cultural texts for the Sámi people. The articles he wrote were published between 1849 and 1854. He quoted from a text titled Päiven Pārne' (Sons of the Sun; in Northern Sámi, Beaivvi bártnit), which had been collected by Anders Fjellner, the Sámi priest at Sorsele. Linder's publication was important and it was quickly re-published in Swedish, English, Finnish and German. None of the original texts belonging to Fjellner survived, making Linder's publication important.

Linder died in Umeå parish on the New Year's Day of 1877, at the age of 93.
