= Ume River =

Ume River Umeälven
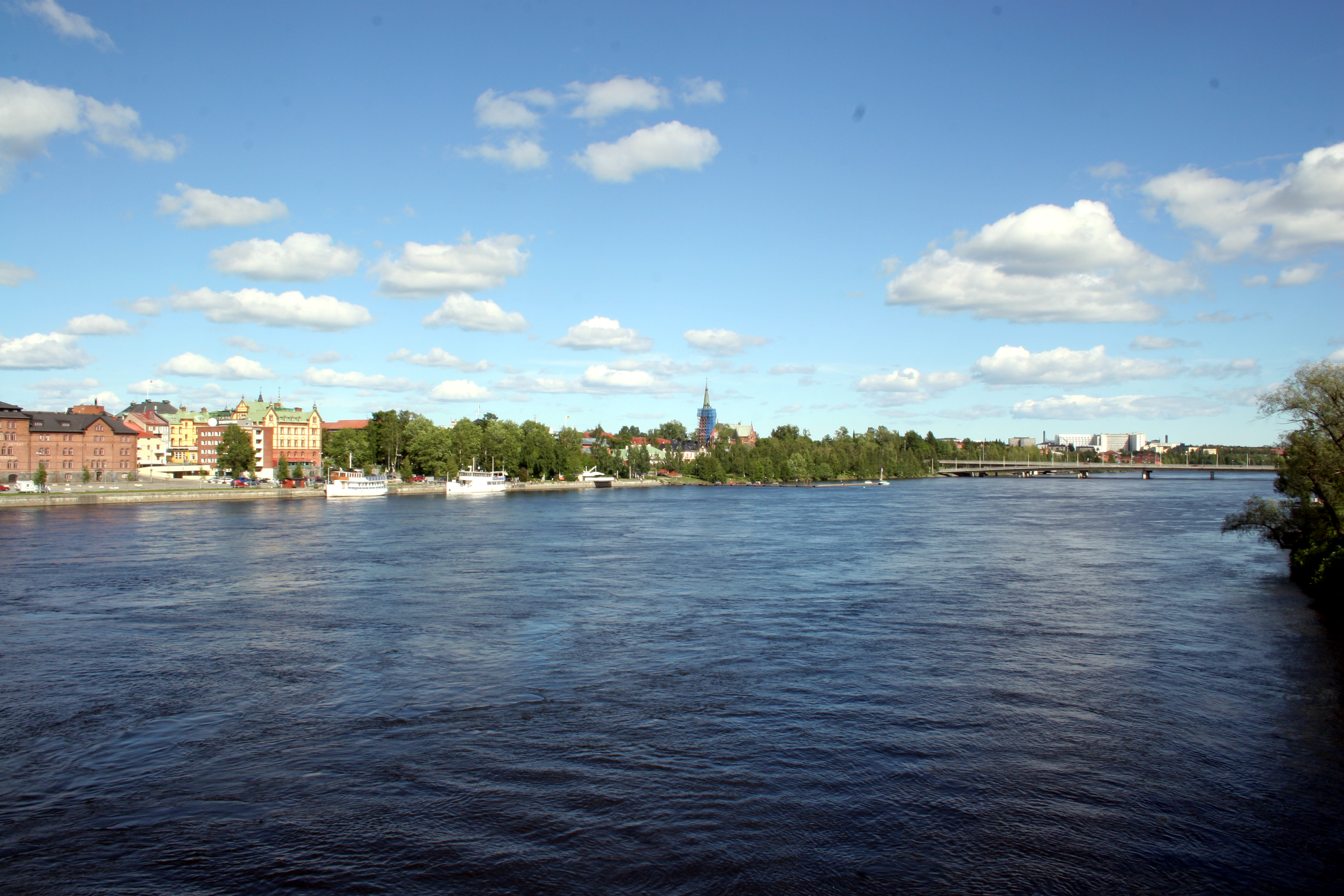
- View of the river's estuary in Umeå

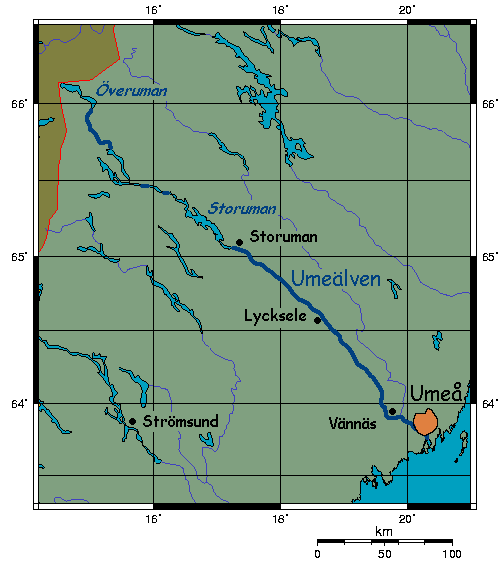
- Native name: Ume älv (Swedish)

Location
- Country: Sweden
- County: Västerbotten

Physical characteristics
- Source: Överuman
  - coordinates: 66°06′N 14°47′E
  - elevation: 525 m (1,722 ft)
- Mouth: Kvarken
  - location: Umeå, Västerbotten, Sweden
  - coordinates: 63°43′N 20°20′E
  - elevation: 0 m (0 ft)
- Length: 470 km (290 mi)
- Basin size: 26,814.8 km^{2} (10,353.3 sq mi)
- Discharge
  - average: 450 m^{3}/s (16,000 cu ft/s)

The Ume River (Swedish: Ume älv or Umeälven) is one of the main rivers in northern Sweden. It is around 470 km (290 mi) long, and flows in a south-eastern direction from its source, the lake Överuman by the Norwegian border within the Scandinavian mountain range. For large parts, the European route E12, also known as Blå Vägen (Blue Route), follows its path.

The river passes through Vindelfjällen Nature Reserve and Lake Storuman and drains into the Gulf of Bothnia on Sweden's east coast at the small town of Holmsund, and adjacent to the city of Umeå. Its chief tributary is the Vindel River, which is the biggest tributary river in Sweden. The Ume and Vindel rivers meet at the village of Vännäs.

At the mouth of the river, where it meets the Gulf of Bothnia, lies Obbolaön (Obbola Island). The island divides the river into two streams just as it runs out into the sea.

== Early history ==
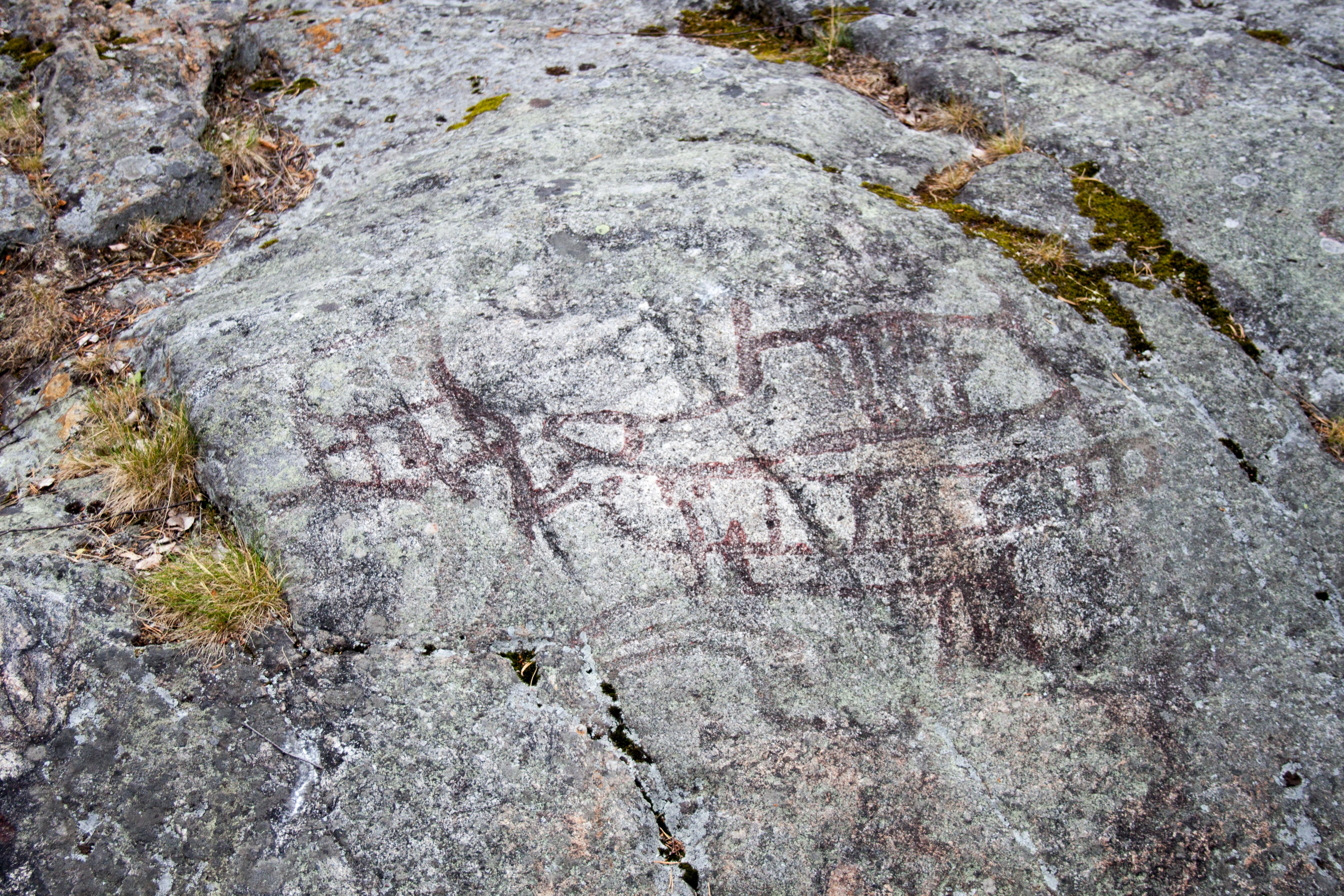
Rock carvings from 3,000 BCE at Norrforsen

People have lived in the Ume river valley for at least five thousand years. At Norrforsen, the site of large rapids along the river, there are petroglyphs from about 3,000 BCE. The rock carvings are from hunter-gatherer culture, and depict mainly elk (forty figures), some boats (ten figures) and one human being, along with some unidentified fragment carvings. Along with hunting, fishing has been an important activity for the inhabitants of the Ume river valley since pre-historic times.

== Fishing ==
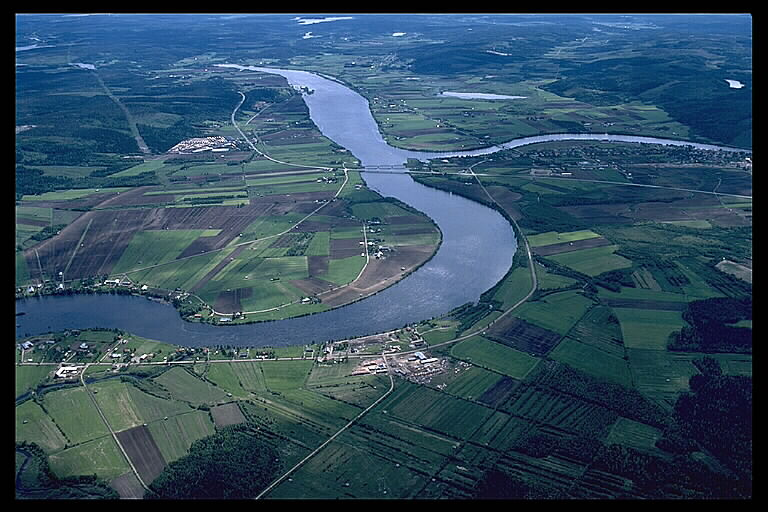
Confluence of the Vindel and Ume rivers at Vännäs village.

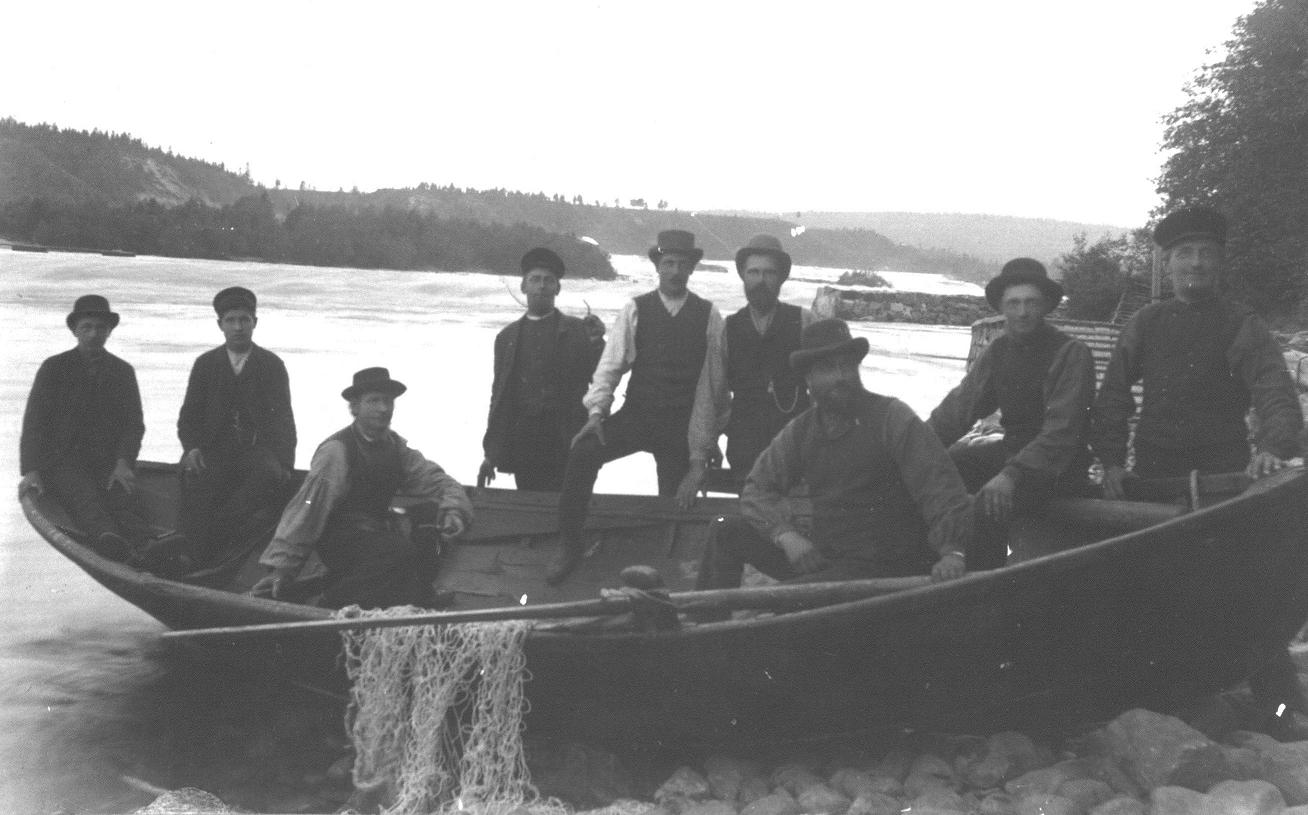
Fishing near Baggböle in the Ume River in the late 1800s.

A number of fish species, notably salmon, live in the Ume river and its tributaries. Ume River and its main tributary, the Vindel River, are crucial habitat for the salmon population of the Baltic Sea. Early settlements were built along the river in the 1200–1300s, to be near the source of salmon. During the early 1700s, local people began to build salmon traps in the river rapids, but spring floods were a danger to the fishing huts and boats. Fishing continued to be an important industry through the 19th century.

Salmon populations continue to be important both ecologically and as a source of economic activity. In the main channel of the Ume River before the hydropower era, salmon could migrate up to Fällforsen, a little over a mile upstream of the town of Vännäs. In the Vindel River, the salmon could go considerably further, at least to Vindelgransele, but sometimes even all the way up to Stensundsforsen at Sorsele. With the construction of the power station in Stornorrfors, the salmon migration into the Vindel River would have been closed if it weren't for the salmon ladder constructed there. With it, the salmon can still make it to spawning grounds, mainly in the upper Vindel River, where nearly half of all smolts that reach the Baltic Sea are born. In addition, since 1959 there has been a compensatory fish farm in Norrfors, from which more than 100,000 fish fry are released annually.

== Industries ==
=== Timber industry ===
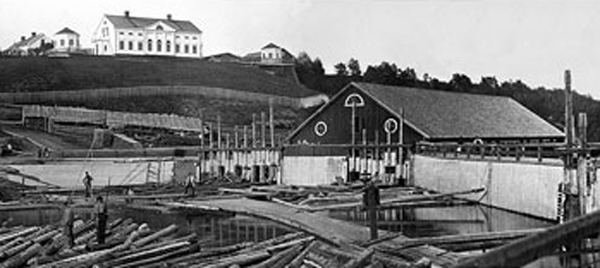
The sawmill on the north bank and the Baggböle manor in the background

At the beginning of the 19th century, the timber industry began to grow along the Ume River. The original sawmill at Baggböle Rapids, built in 1813-14, stemmed from a partnership between Johan Unander, Eric Nyberg and Johan Vikner, who obtained permission to build there. Development of the industry around Baggböle continued with the arrival of Scottish-Swedish brothers James and Robert Dickson in the 1830s, as a timber market emerged in Great Britain. The Dicksons had built a timber business in the Värmland province but in the 1820s they constructed two large water-powered sawmills. The sawmill at Baggböle was the largest in Sweden powered by water. So infamous were their methods that a new word in Swedish was derived from the name of "Baggböle". The Swedish word baggböleri is a pejorative term for reckless deforestation. The sawmills worked from May to October each year employing 170 workers, excluding women and children.

The water-powered sawmill was under threat when steam power was introduced further south at Tunadal in Sweden in 1849. Twenty more steam-powered Swedish saw mills began operating within a decade. These sawmills were usually located near ports, and the earlier saw mills situated near water power were closed. The water-powered saw mill on the Ume River was one of the last to close in 1884, when a steam-powered mill was erected in Holmsund at the mouth of the river.

=== Hydroelectricity ===
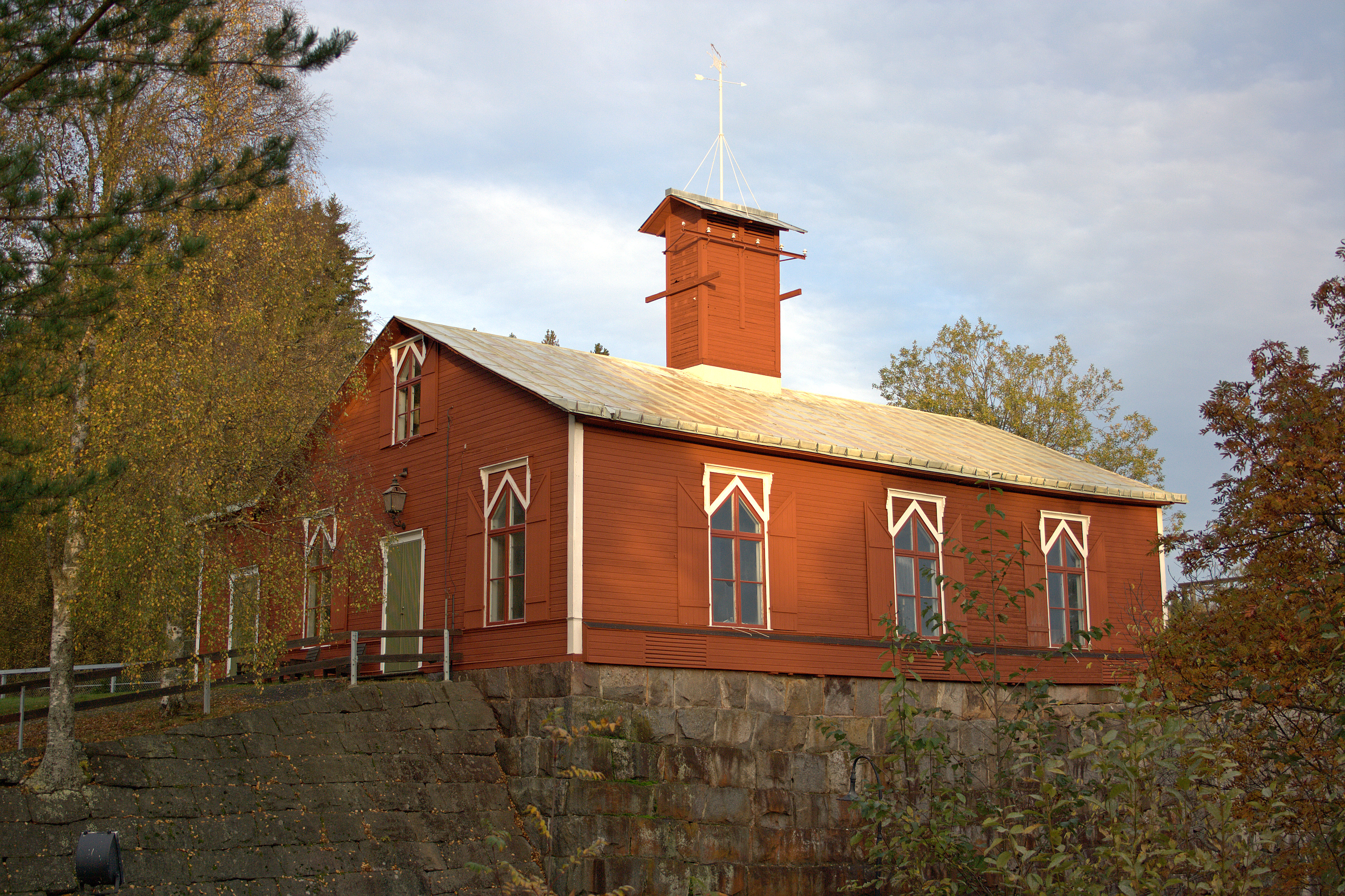
Klabböle Kraftverk at Baggböle rapids, now a museum.

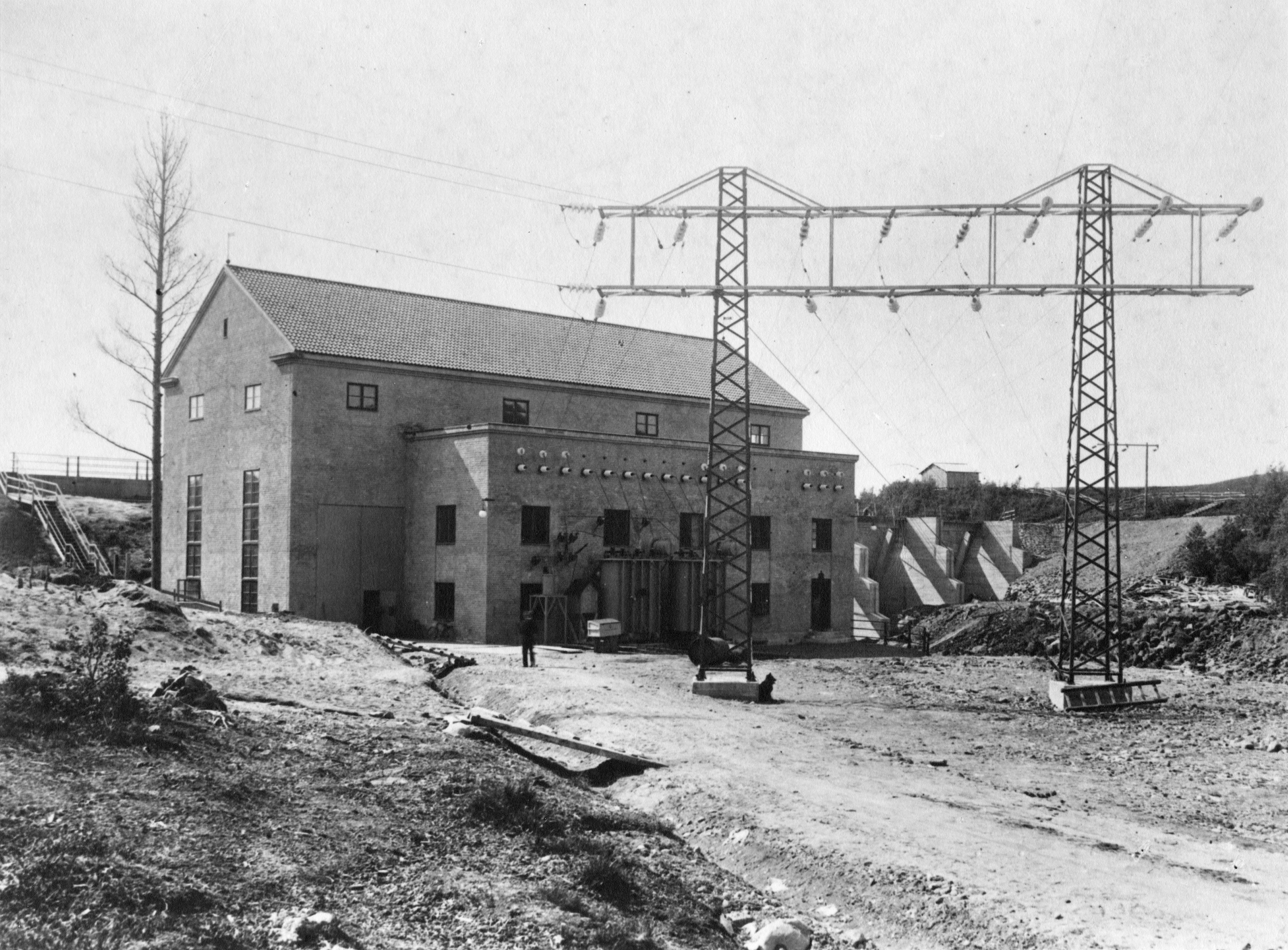
Exterior of Norrfors Power Station in 1962.

A hydroelectric power plant was built to replace a steam power plant providing electricity to the city of Umeå in 1899, Klabböle Kraftverk, on the south bank of the river. The plant delivered electricity to Umeå for the first time on December 6, 1899, but problems arose due to its location along the river, where supercooling produces ice slush. The plant nevertheless supplied electricity until 1958, when it was replaced by the newly constructed state-owned power plant at Norrforsen.

An expansion site, constructed on the former Baggböle sawmill site in 1914, was eventually sold to the city of Umeå in 1947 and the land is a park and arboretum called Arboretum Norr. The former plant Klabböle Kraftverk is now a museum.

In the 1950s, hydroelectricity development required building reservoirs and dams throughout Sweden, but concerns were being raised about the environmental impact of these power plants. In particular, there were heated discussions about the developments on the Ume River and Vindel River. This eventually led in 1961 to an agreement called the Peace of Sarek (Swedish: Freden i Sarek), which prevented development on some rivers of the Vindel River and in exchange gave freedom to develop the other rivers, including the Ume River.

The Ume River has since been extensively cultivated for hydroelectric power. There are now thirteen power stations on the river, all but two having been established in the late 1950s to late 1960s. The power station at Stornorrfors generates more electricity annually than any other hydroelectric power plant in Sweden, incorporating five turbines. It is second largest in terms of power output after the Hårsprånget power station on the Lule River, further north.

== Places named after Ume River ==
In Schiedam in the Netherlands, Swedish-like houses are built and one of the streets, the Umefors, is named after this river.

== See also ==
Some of the other large rivers in northern Sweden:

- Kalix River
- Torne River
- Lule River
- Pite River
- Skellefte River
- Ångerman River
