= Nydalahöjd =

- Residential area
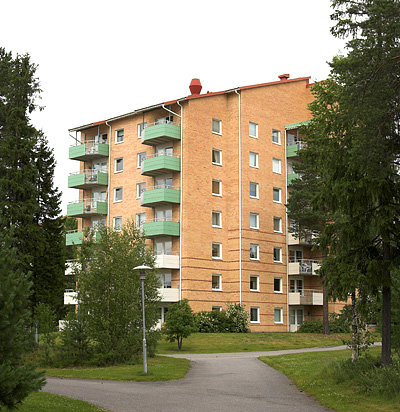

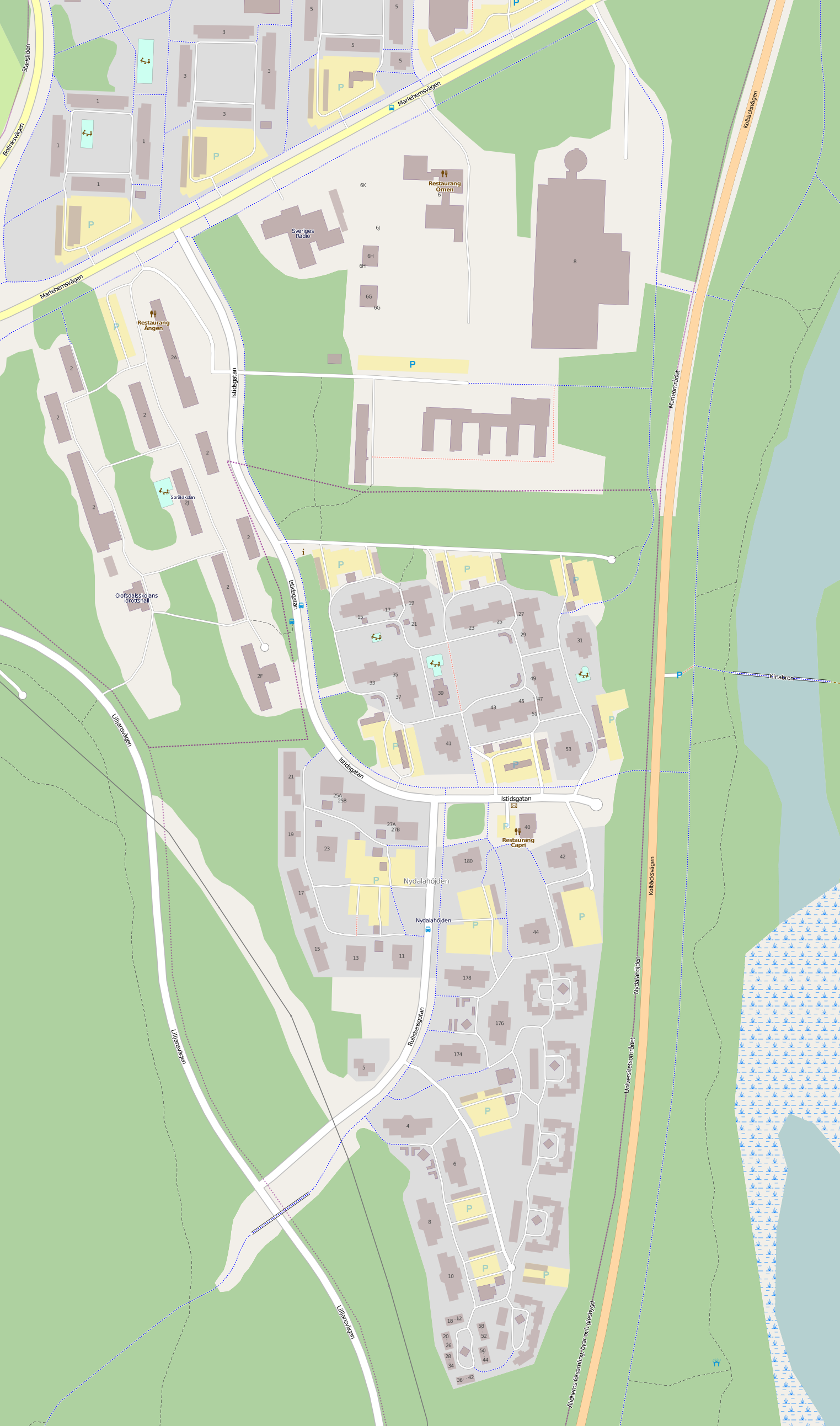
- Map of Nydalahöjd, from OpenStreetMap
- Coordinates: 63°49′32″N 20°19′39″E
- Country: Sweden
- Province: Västerbotten
- County: Västerbotten County
- Municipality: Umeå Municipality
- Time zone: UTC+1 (CET)
  - Summer (DST): UTC+2 (CEST)

Nydalahöjd, sometimes called Nydalahöjden, is a residential area in Umeå, Sweden. It is located next to the lake Nydalasjön, about 4 km (2.5 mi) outside the central city.

== History ==
The name is derived from former governor Pehr Adam Stromberg's yard Nydala, which, however, was located further north than today's Nydalahöjd, on the northeastern edge of the current Mariehem.

Nydalahöjd was built in the early 1990s by AB Bostaden, a public housing company owned by Umeå Municipality. The area consists of rental apartments and many of them are student apartments intended for students at Umeå University and Swedish University of Agricultural Sciences. Nydalahöjd consists of two streets; Istidsgatan and Rullstensgatan. Rullstensgatan consists mostly of student apartments.
