= Tavelån =

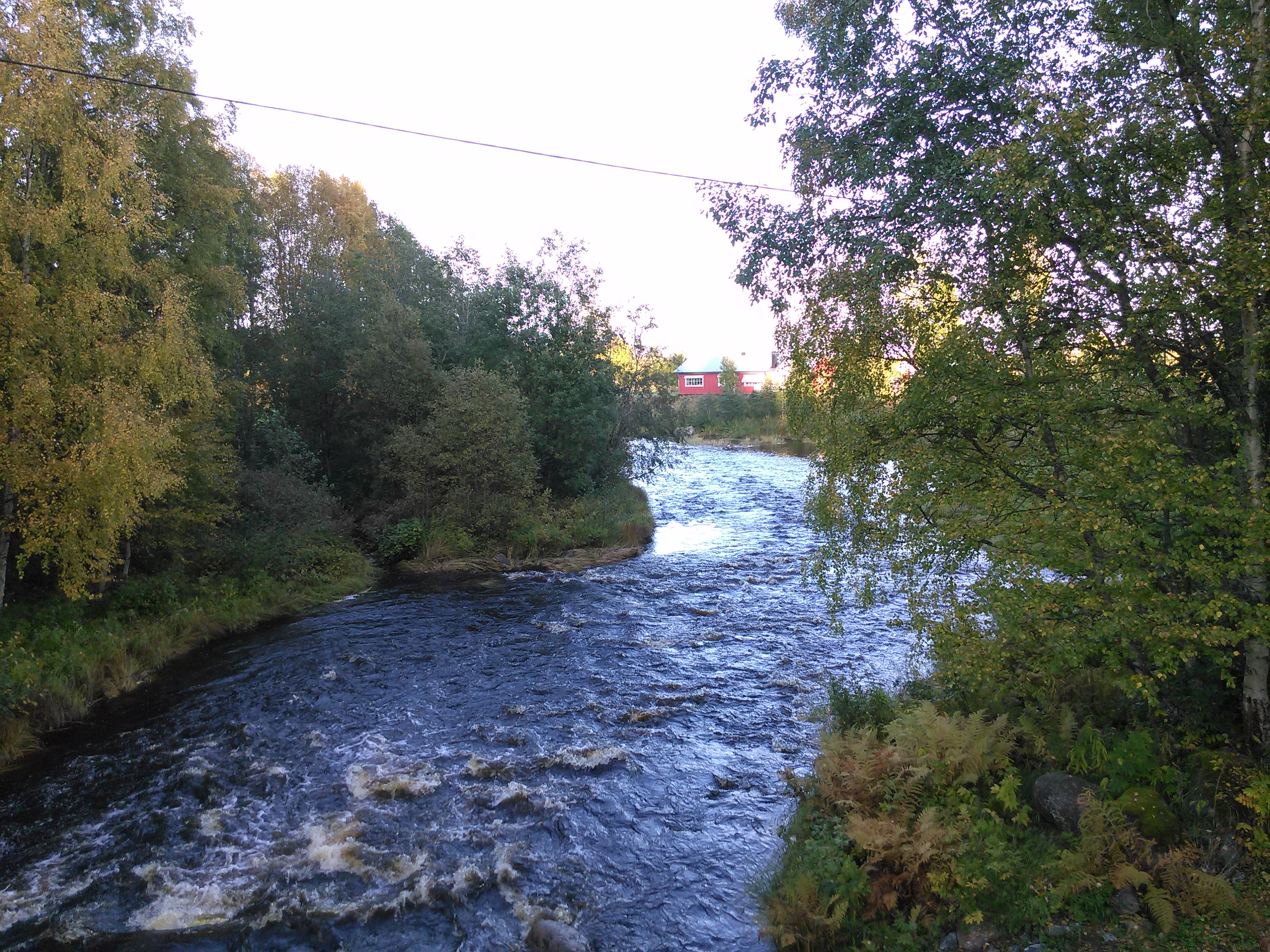

Location
- Country: Sweden
- County: Västerbotten
- Municipality: Umeå

Physical characteristics
- Source: Tavelsjön
- Mouth: Gulf of Bothnia
  - coordinates: 63°46′45″N 20°24′55″E
  - elevation: 0 m (0 ft)
- Length: 50 km (31 mi)
- Basin size: 409.9 km^{2} (158.3 sq mi)

Tavelån is a river in southern Västerbotten, Sweden. It is about 50 kilometers long and has a drainage area of 409.9 km^{2}. The river rises in Tavelsjön and flows into Tavelfjärden in the Gulf of Bothnia. It passes through the villages of Kvarnfors, Hissjö, Håkmark, Ersmark, Anumark and Innertavle. Tavelån are sometimes incorrectly called "Tavleån".
