= Överboda =

- Location within Västerbotten Location within Sweden
- Coordinates: 63°51′02″N 19°55′55″E
- Country: Sweden
- Province: Västerbotten
- County: Västerbotten County
- Municipality: Umeå Municipality

Area
  - Total: 0.51 km^{2} (0.20 sq mi)

Population (31 December 2010)
  - Total: 218
  - Density: 427/km^{2} (1,110/sq mi)
- Time zone: UTC+1 (CET)
  - Summer (DST): UTC+2 (CEST)

Överboda is a locality situated in Umeå Municipality, Västerbotten County, Sweden with 218 inhabitants in 2010. Big stones with carvings have been found in the area, with pictures and symbols. The individual carvings are 4–7 cm wide and 4 –9 cm high.
