= Yttersjö =

- Location within Västerbotten Location within Sweden
- Coordinates: 63°46′30″N 19°59′10″E
- Country: Sweden
- Province: Västerbotten
- County: Västerbotten County
- Municipality: Umeå Municipality

Area
  - Total: 0.88 km^{2} (0.34 sq mi)

Population (31 December 2010)
  - Total: 384
  - Density: 438/km^{2} (1,130/sq mi)
- Time zone: UTC+1 (CET)
  - Summer (DST): UTC+2 (CEST)

Yttersjö is a locality situated in Umeå Municipality, Västerbotten County, Sweden with 384 inhabitants in 2010.
