= Västibyn =

- Location within Västerbotten Location within Sweden
- Coordinates: 63°55′N 20°12′E
- Country: Sweden
- Province: Västerbotten
- County: Västerbotten County
- Municipality: Umeå Municipality

Area
  - Total: 0.26 km^{2} (0.10 sq mi)

Population (31 December 2010)
  - Total: 234
  - Density: 910/km^{2} (2,400/sq mi)
- Time zone: UTC+1 (CET)
  - Summer (DST): UTC+2 (CEST)

Västibyn is a locality situated in Umeå Municipality, Västerbotten County, Sweden with 234 inhabitants in 2010.
