= Mariehem SK =

Swedish football club

- Full name: Mariehem Sportklubb
- Nickname: MSK
- Founded: 1974
- Ground: MSK Arena; Umeå; Sweden
- Capacity: 2,500
- Coach: Hamdija Comic; Peter Hägglöv
- League: Division 2 Norrland
- 2012: Division 2 Norrland, 4th
Home colours	Away colours

Mariehem SK (Mariehem sportklubb, MSK) is a Swedish football team from Mariehem in Umeå currently playing in Division 2 Norrland after finishing 8th in 2009.

== Background ==
Mariehem SK was formed in 1974 and currently has 28 teams including junior teams (13 women's and girl's teams and 15 men's and boys teams). The club has its own artificial turf pitch called MSK Arena. The club succeeded in 2007 to win their leagues with three of the Senior teams. Mariehem SK's women's team won the Division 3 Västerbotten, Mariehem FF (farm team to the women's team) won the Division 4 Västerbotten and Mariehem SK's men, despite being newcomers, won Division 3 Southern Norrland and moved up to Division 2, where they have played since. The club is affiliated to the Västerbottens Fotbollförbund.

MSK is, and has long been, Umeå football's main nursery. A number of local players have Mariehem SK as the parent club, for example Anton Holmberg (UCD), Mikael Dahlberg (Umeå FC and GIF Sundsvall) and Hanna Ljungberg (Umeå IK).

The club also arranges Umeå Football Festival, which is Sweden's fourth largest football cup competition for children and youth players.

== Season to season ==
Season	Level	Division	Section	Position	Movements
1997	Tier 5	Division 4	Västerbotten Södra	6th	
1998	Tier 5	Division 4	Västerbotten Södra	4th	
1999	Tier 5	Division 4	Västerbotten Södra	7th	
2000	Tier 5	Division 4	Västerbotten Södra	3rd	
2001	Tier 5	Division 4	Västerbotten Södra	3rd	
2002	Tier 5	Division 4	Västerbotten Södra	8th	
2003	Tier 5	Division 4	Västerbotten Södra	3rd	
2004	Tier 5	Division 4	Västerbotten Södra	5th	
2005	Tier 5	Division 4	Västerbotten Södra	7th	
2006*	Tier 6	Division 4	Västerbotten Södra	1st	Promoted
2007	Tier 5	Division 3	Mellersta Norrland	1st	Promoted
2008	Tier 4	Division 2	Norrland	8th	
2009	Tier 4	Division 2	Norrland	8th	
2010	Tier 4	Division 2	Norrland	10th	Relegation Playoffs
2011	Tier 4	Division 2	Norrland	3rd	
2012	Tier 4	Division 2	Norrland	4th	
2013	Tier 4	Division 2	Norrland	8th	
2014	Tier 4	Division 2	Norrland		

* League restructuring in 2006 resulted in a new division being created at Tier 3 and subsequent divisions dropping a level.

== Attendances ==
In recent seasons Mariehem SK have had the following average attendances:

Season	Average attendance	Division / Section	Level
2006	Not available	Div 4 Västerbotten Södra	Tier 6
2007	106	Div 3 Mellersta Norrland	Tier 5
2008	140	Div 2 Norrland	Tier 4
2009	174	Div 2 Norrland	Tier 4
2010	193	Div 2 Norrland	Tier 4

* Attendances are provided in the Publikliga sections of the Svenska Fotbollförbundet website.

== Squad ==
Note: Flags indicate national team as defined under FIFA eligibility rules; some limited exceptions apply. Players may hold more than one non-FIFA nationality.

No.	Pos.	Nation	Player
26	GK	SWE	Simon Öttenius
24	GK	SWE	Achmed Al-Fadhi
2	DF	SWE	Magnus Dahlin
3	DF	FIN	Jesse Kalliokoski
4	DF	SWE	Gustav Thoms
6	DF	SWE	Abdi Hassan
7	MF	SWE	David Norrman
8	MF	SWE	Zakaria Chennoufi
9	MF	SWE	Sirac Guliyev
10	MF	SWE	Eric Ntekizimana
11	DF	SWE	Mohammed Al-Harbi

No.	Pos.	Nation	Player
12	MF	SWE	Emil Sjöberg
13	FW	SWE	Kim Lundmark
14	MF	SWE	Tobias Hedendahl Filipsson
15	MF	SWE	Simon Söderlind
16	MF	SWE	Robin Åberg
17	DF	SWE	Ibrahime Bah
18	MF	SWE	Olle Abrahamsson
19	FW	SWE	Robin Arestav
22	MF	FIN	Markus Kåla
35	MF	SWE	Hadi Hussein

=== Staff members 2014 ===
- (Sweden) Hamdija Comic – Coach
- (Sweden) Peter Hägglöv – Coach
- (Sweden) Christer Öttenius – Equipment Manager
