= Täfteå =

- Location within Västerbotten Location within Sweden
- Coordinates: 63°50′N 20°29′E
- Country: Sweden
- Province: Västerbotten
- County: Västerbotten County
- Municipality: Umeå Municipality

Area
  - Total: 1.31 km^{2} (0.51 sq mi)

Population (31 December 2010)
  - Total: 1,231
  - Density: 938/km^{2} (2,430/sq mi)
- Time zone: UTC+1 (CET)
  - Summer (DST): UTC+2 (CEST)

Täfteå is a locality situated in Umeå Municipality, Västerbotten County, Sweden, with 1,231 inhabitants in 2010.
