= Ersmark =

Ersmark may refer to:

- Ersmark, Umeå, a locality in Umeå Municipality, Västerbotten County, Sweden
- Ersmark, Skellefteå, a locality in Skellefteå Municipality, Västerbotten County, Sweden
