= Stöcksjö =

- Location within Västerbotten Location within Sweden
- Coordinates: 63°46′30″N 20°11′45″E
- Country: Sweden
- Province: Västerbotten
- County: Västerbotten County
- Municipality: Umeå Municipality

Area
  - Total: 0.39 km^{2} (0.15 sq mi)

Population (31 December 2010)
  - Total: 215
  - Density: 551/km^{2} (1,430/sq mi)
- Time zone: UTC+1 (CET)
  - Summer (DST): UTC+2 (CEST)

Stöcksjö is a locality situated in Umeå Municipality, Västerbotten County, Sweden with 215 inhabitants in 2010.

Stöcksjö is a village located 9,6 km south of the Swedish town Umeå.

In the center of Stöcksjö a lake named Stöcksjön situated with different bathing places. There is a beach with locker rooms, toilets, barbecue site and a candy trolley in the summer. There is a nudist beach located on Dragonudden. It offers a barbecue site, benches and toilets. In the winter the lake is a popular place for jig and also cross-country skiing. Stöcksjö also has a school named Stöcksjö Skola. It is a primary school with a preschool that was earlier divided into two parts, Trollet and Vätten. Since 2012 there are four different sections named Lusten, Modet, Glädjen and Viljan. Stöcksjö skolan is located on Norra Byvägen 40 and is fairly close to the forest, which is used almost daily by kids when they play in the school playground during breaks from class.

Besides from Stöcksjön and Stöcksjö Skola there is a riding stable named SURF. It stands for Södra Umeå Ryttarförening (Southern Umeå Equestrian society). The riding stable is located on the address Södra kustvägen 30 in Stöcksjö.

== History ==
=== The murder in Stöcksjö ===
Even though Stöcksjö is a calm little village were families live, it has somewhat of a dark history. In 1966 a man was murdered and to this day no one knows who the murderer is. Karl Axel Andersson disappeared around 17 October 1966 and his body was discovered in Kvistforskanalen on 10 August 1967. When Andersson disappeared neighbours found bloodstains on the stairs outside his house. The police had trouble finding the body even though they had good help from civilians. The police used dogs, and people from the neighborhood went searching alongside. Altogether the search area was up to 155 miles around almost all roads in Stöcksjö but they came up empty-handed.

== Tillers life before ==
Because Stöcksjö is located a bit outside Umeå, most of the inhabitants have been farmers who produced different types of seed. Earlier, for all farmers, the work was especially hard since they did not have the same equipment that today's society can offer.

=== Companies located in Stöcksjö ===
- Röbäcks Sweden AB is a company located in Stöcksjö who delivers concrete- asphalt- and environmental industry products and facilities.
- Stöcksjö Trafik AB who is in a road carrier business along with construction machinery who has their main office located in Stöcksjö.
