= Åheden =

Coordinates: 63°40′45″N 20°03′25″E

Åheden is an ancient agricultural society, with about 55 people living (December 2008) 25 km south of Umeå, in northern Sweden near the Arctic Circle, between localities Sörmjöle and Norrmjöle.

Åheden is located at Flour bay. The name comes from Åhedån flowing through the southern part of the village. Near the dried-up channel of the Skellefte river is the Åheden nature reserve.

Åheden from the years 1985-90 has gone from summer residents to year-round residents of the converted / to build / newly built holiday homes. Municipal services of water and mail, garbage disposal, school and make the area year-round attractive.

A large number (15 pieces) cairns are at the burial during the later Iron Age 100 BC low at the water's edge but because of postglacial land uplift is the now 75 meters above the sea. Åheden is in the area which has the world's largest country increase, up to one centimeter per year.
