= Norrbotten County =

County (län) of Sweden

Norrbotten County Norrbottens län (Swedish) Norrbottenin lääni (Meänkieli/Finnish) Norrbottena leatna (Northern Sami)
- County
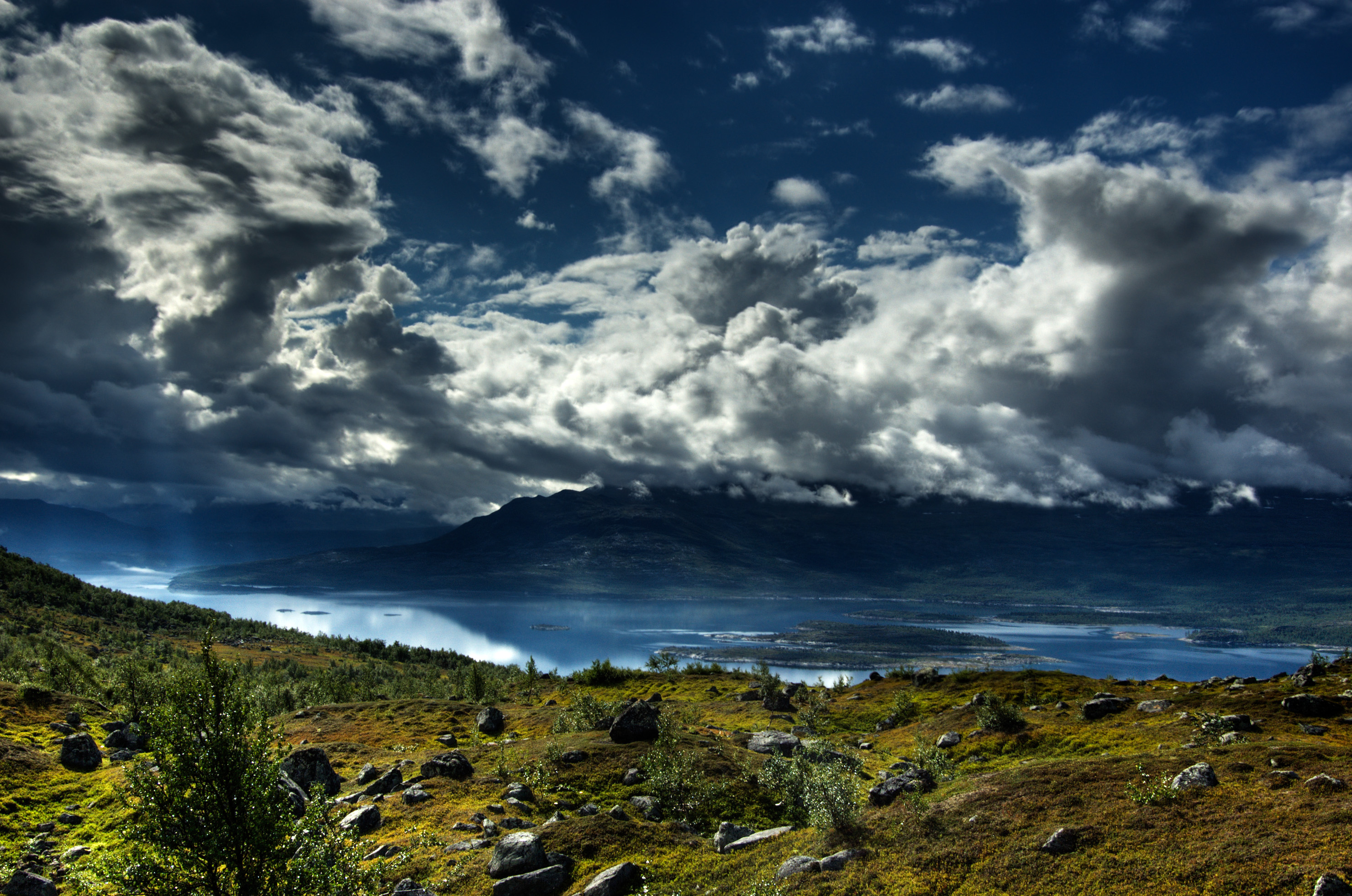

- Flag Coat of arms

- Norrbotten County in Sweden

- Location map of Norrbotten County in Sweden
- Coordinates: 67°N 19.7°E
- Country: Sweden
- Formed: 1810
- Capital: Luleå
- Municipalities: 14: Älvsbyn; Arjeplog; Arvidsjaur; Boden; Gällivare; Haparanda; Jokkmokk; Kalix; Kiruna; Luleå; Överkalix; Övertorneå; Pajala; Piteå

Government
  - Council: Region Norrbotten
  - Governor: Lotta Finstorp
  - Administrative board: Länsstyrelsen i Norrbottens län

Area
  - Total: 98,244.8 km^{2} (37,932.5 sq mi)

Population (31 December 2023)
  - Total: 248,480
  - Density: 2.5292/km^{2} (6.5506/sq mi)

GDP
  - Total: SEK 102 billion €10.887 billion (2015)
- Time zone: UTC+1 (CET)
  - Summer (DST): UTC+2 (CEST)
- ISO 3166 code: SE-BD
- NUTS Region: SE332
- Website: www.lansstyrelsen.se/norrbotten

Norrbotten County (Note: Swedish: Norrbottens län pronounced [ˈnɔrˌbɔtːɛns lɛn]; Meänkieli: Norrbottenin lääni, pronounced [ˈnorrbotːenin ˈlæːni]; Finnish: Norrbottenin lääni, pronounced [ˈnorrbotːenin ˈlæːni]; Northern Sami: Norrbottena leatna, pronounced [ˈnorːbotːena ˈleatna]) is the northernmost county or län of Sweden. It is also the largest county by land area, almost a quarter of Sweden's total area. It shares borders with Västerbotten County to the southwest, the Gulf of Bothnia to the southeast, the counties of Nordland and Troms in Norway to the northwest, and Lapland Province in Finland to the northeast.

The name "Norrbotten" is also used for a province of the same name. Norrbotten province covers only the eastern part of Norrbotten County with the inland mostly belonging to the Swedish Lapland province (Lappland).

The capital of Norrbotten is Luleå. Other significant towns include Boden, Kiruna and Piteå. The majority of the population lives in the namesake province, whereas the Lapland part of the county is sparsely populated. Norrbotten covers a larger land area than both Austria and Portugal. The four largest municipalities in Sweden by land area are in the county. Sweden's tallest mountain Kebnekaise and deepest lake Hornavan are both within the county. The vast mountains are the source of northern Sweden's vast river systems running through Norrbotten.

The northern part of Norrbotten lies within the Arctic Circle.

== Provinces ==
Norrbotten County consists of the entire province of Norrbotten and about two thirds of Swedish Lapland.

== Geography ==
Norrbotten County covers almost one quarter of Sweden's land area, but is sparsely inhabited. This is especially true for inland parts of Lapland.

The climate is generally cold, because of its northern location. However, the long summer days allow crops to ripen within two to three months, and agriculture is traditionally important, particularly near the coast and along the lower reaches of the Torne River. Grains, particularly barley, potatoes and turnips are grown to some extent, but the most important crop is hay for livestock. There are around 250,000 reindeer in the winter herd, a number regulated by the Swedish state. The reindeer are herded by the Indigenous Sámi, organised in 15 Sámi Mountain villages, 9 Forest Sámi villages and 8 concession Sámi villages. Hunting and fishing are of major importance for the local inhabitants.

Major rivers in Norrbotten County (listed north to south) include the Torne, the Lule River, Kalix River, and Pite River. Rivers shared with the Västerbotten County include the Skellefte River and Ume River. Other rivers that flow directly to the sea and that are at least 100 km long are the Sangis River, Råne River, Åby River, and Byske River.

The county includes many islands in the Bay of Bothnia, which make up the Norrbotten archipelago. It is divided into the archipelagos of Piteå (550 islands), Luleå (1,312 islands), Kalix (792 islands) and Haparanda (652 islands). The largest island is Rånön in the Kalix archipelago.

== Population ==
The population has increased during the last hundred years. The estimated 2002 population was 250,000. In the 1912 census, the population was 166,641 (4,000 more males than females), of which about 120,000 were in the Norrbotten province part. Twenty years earlier, in 1892, the population was only 110,000. Since the 1960s, however, most municipalities of the county have experienced a decrease in population, particularly those inland.

== Riksdag elections ==
The table details all Riksdag election results of Norrbotten County since the unicameral era began in 1970. The blocs denote which party would support the Prime Minister or the lead opposition party towards the end of the elected parliament.

Year	Turnout	Votes	V	S	MP	C	L	KD	M	SD	NyD	Left	Right
1970	86.4	150,316	13.7	51.7		15.8	8.4	2.3	7.5			65.4	31.7
1973	89.6	157,383	13.5	52.1		18.5	5.1	2.1	8.1			65.5	31.6
1976	90.3	169,641	11.2	53.7		18.2	6.0	2.0	8.1			64.9	32.4
1979	90.3	172,587	10.3	55.4		13.8	5.9	2.0	10.3			65.6	30.0
1982	90.6	175,156	10.4	58.8	1.0	11.6	3.1	2.2	11.8			69.2	26.5
1985	89.1	174,171	10.3	59.0	0.8	10.3	8.1		10.9			69.3	29.3
1988	85.1	166,243	10.2	58.1	3.6	8.6	7.5	2.4	8.5			72.0	24.6
1991	85.3	167,424	9.1	55.5	2.4	7.3	6.9	4.6	11.0		2.8	64.5	29.8
1994	87.4	174,045	11.4	60.6	3.5	5.4	4.7	2.6	10.3		0.3	75.5	23.1
1998	82.0	160,277	22.2	47.4	3.4	4.4	3.0	6.5	11.8			72.9	25.6
2002	80.7	154,978	12.7	47.9	5.2	5.1	6.5	5.3	7.2	0.3		65.9	24.1
2006	81.8	156,576	10.5	51.5	4.1	6.4	4.3	4.2	13.4	1.5		66.1	28.3
2010	84.9	164,963	9.3	51.9	5.3	4.7	4.3	3.3	16.4	3.9		66.4	28.6
2014	85.6	166,177	8.6	48.7	4.9	4.5	3.2	3.0	12.9	11.0		62.2	23.7
2018	86.7	166,678	10.7	41.7	2.8	7.1	3.2	4.6	12.8	15.8		62.2	36.4
2022	84.6	163,242	7.0	41.6	3.4	5.3	2.5	5.1	13.6	20.3		57.3	41.5

== History ==
During the Middle Ages, Norrbotten was considered to be terra nullius ("no man's land"). The area was populated by Sami, Kvens and different people related to the Finns. From the Middle Ages on, the Swedish kings tried to colonise and Christianise the area. However; even today, Tornedalians and Sami people still live in the area and maintain their own culture and customs.

In the first half of the 17th century, several ore deposits were discovered in what is now known as Norrbotten County. The silver of Nasafjäll was discovered during the autumn of 1634 and subsequently mined from 1635 to 1659 and from the 1770s to 1810.

Following the Finnish War in 1809, Västerbotten County was split between Sweden and Finland, with the larger part remaining within the Swedish borders. In 1810, the county was divided again when Norrbotten County was created out of the northern part, on the Swedish side. Most people in Norrbotten County still refer to the entire county, including the areas in Swedish Lapland, when they say 'Norrbotten'.

The natural resources (hydroelectricity, timber, and minerals, especially iron) of Norrbotten have played a key role in the industrialization of Sweden. The 20th century saw strong mobility in and out of the county, with many young people moving south and people from other parts of the country moving in. In the 1970s and 1980s, the drainage of (mostly young) workers due to high unemployment was considerable, and people in the area began to voice feelings of being misunderstood or economically abused by the south and especially the capital Stockholm.

=== Heraldry ===
The coat of arms of Norrbotten County combines the arms of the provinces Västerbotten and Lappland and was granted in 1949. Since 1995 the province Norrbotten has a coat of arms of its own, but the county arms have not been changed accordingly. When it is shown with a royal crown, it represents the County Administrative Board. Blazon: "Quartered, the arms of Västerbotten and the arms of Lappland."

=== Culture ===
Many different cultures can be found in Norrbotten County, including Sami culture, Tornedalian/Kven culture and the Swedish settler-culture. Many of the old local Swedish and Finnic dialects have survived in the area. The people of Norrbotten County have a saying: "I am not a Swede; I am a Norrbothnian". A local way of speaking, coupled with understated irony, is also sometimes used as a means to exclude southerners. These contrasts are well known throughout Sweden and often appear in TV, films, literature and folklore connected to Norrbotten, for characterizing, satiric or dramatic purposes (e.g. some characters in the books of Eyvind Johnson or the police detective Einar Rönn in the crime novels of Maj Sjöwall and Per Wahlöö).

The coast has the historical cities of Luleå and Piteå. Luleå's Gammelstad ("Old town"), which is 10 km north of the present downtown, has been declared a UNESCO World Heritage Site.

Apart from the Swedish language, Sami, Meänkieli, and Finnish may be used in dealing with government agencies, courts, municipalities, preschools and nursing homes in parts of Norrbotten County. The Sami languages have official minority language status in Kiruna, Gällivare, Jokkmokk, Luleå, Arjeplog and Arvidsjaur municipalities. Meänkieli and Finnish have the same status in Gällivare, Haparanda, Kiruna, Pajala, and Övertorneå, Luleå and Kalix municipalities.

== Administration ==
The main aims of the County Administrative Board are to fulfil the goals set in national politics by the Riksdag and the Government, to promote the development of the county, and to establish regional goals. The County Administrative Board is a Government Agency headed by a Governor (see List of Norrbotten Governors).

== Municipalities ==
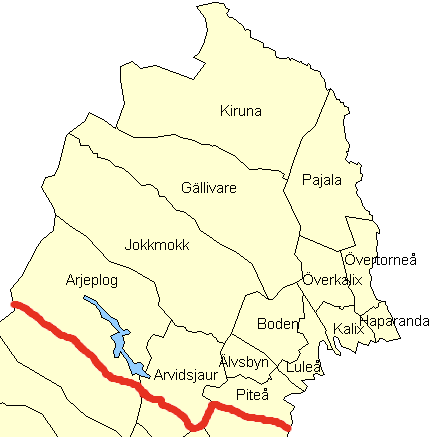

Municipality	Population (2020)	Area (km2)	Province
Arjeplog	2,757	14 494,08	Lapland
Arvidsjaur	6,194	6 126,28	Lapland
Boden	28,021	4 290,95	Norrbotten
Gällivare	17,511	16 818,78	Lapland
Haparanda	9,660	1 887,66	Norrbotten
Jokkmokk	4,908	19 334,08	Lapland
Kalix	15,873	3 715,65	Norrbotten
Kiruna	22,841	20 553,28	Lapland
Luleå	78,102	4 911,97	Norrbotten
Pajala	6,056	8 050,87	Norrbotten
Piteå	42,247	4 640,69	Norrbotten
Älvsbyn	8,084	1 795,24	Norrbotten
Överkalix	3,305	2 919,46	Norrbotten
Övertorneå	4,288	2 488,29	Norrbotten

The Sami languages have official minority language status in Kiruna, Gällivare, Jokkmokk, Luleå, Arjeplog and Arvidsjaur municipalites. Meänkieli and Finnish have the same status in Gällivare, Haparanda, Kiruna, Pajala, and Övertorneå, Luleå and Kalix municipalities.

=== Foreign background ===
SCB have collected statistics on backgrounds of residents since 2002. These tables consist of all who have two foreign-born parents or are born abroad themselves. A majority of them are of Finnish descent. The chart lists election years and the last year on record alone.

Location	2002	2006	2010	2014	2018	2019
Arjeplog	5.8	7.1	9.5	10.9	12.0	11.8
Arvidsjaur	2.9	3.7	5.5	8.5	10.3	10.4
Boden	5.2	6.4	7.3	9.8	11.3	11.7
Gällivare	5.5	6.6	7.5	8.7	10.6	11.1
Haparanda	50.2	50.3	50.3	50.5	52.0	51.8
Jokkmokk	5.7	6.3	8.6	11.1	13.8	13.9
Kalix	9.8	10.5	11.2	11.9	13.1	13.3
Kiruna	9.6	10.2	10.8	12.0	14.1	14.5
Luleå	8.9	10.1	10.8	11.7	13.5	14.0
Pajala	12.2	12.3	13.1	14.2	16.3	16.8
Piteå	4.2	4.7	5.1	5.8	7.5	7.8
Älvsbyn	4.0	5.5	7.0	9.2	10.8	11.9
Överkalix	4.7	6.1	8.3	10.5	12.6	13.8
Övertorneå	23.6	25.3	27.6	29.7	31.1	30.1
Total	9.2	10.1	10.9	12.0	13.8	14.1
Source: SCB

== Transport ==
The main mode of personal travel within Norrbotten is by car. The distances are long, e.g. 345 km between Luleå and Kiruna. The roads have been given relatively high speed limits compared to southern Sweden, usually 100–110 km/h.

Norrbotten has a railway network focused on heavy freight traffic. There are two main railways. Stambanan genom övre Norrland connects Norrbotten with central and southern Sweden. Malmbanan connects Luleå with the iron mines in Gällivare and Kiruna and the ice-free port of Narvik. Malmbanan has highest amount of freight traffic in Scandinavia, especially the part between Kiruna and Narvik.

Air travel is the main mode of travel between Norrbotten and southern Sweden. The main airport is Luleå Airport, sixth largest in Sweden. Other airports are Arvidsjaur Airport, Gällivare Airport, Kiruna Airport and Pajala Airport.

== See also ==
- North Sweden European Office
