= Brännland =

- Location within Västerbotten Location within Sweden
- Coordinates: 63°53′N 20°04′E
- Country: Sweden
- Province: Västerbotten
- County: Västerbotten County
- Municipality: Umeå Municipality

Area
  - Total: 0.28 km^{2} (0.11 sq mi)

Population (31 December 2010)
  - Total: 220
  - Density: 780/km^{2} (2,000/sq mi)
- Time zone: UTC+1 (CET)
  - Summer (DST): UTC+2 (CEST)

Brännland is a locality situated in Umeå Municipality, Västerbotten County, Sweden with 220 inhabitants in 2010.

== See also ==
- Blue Highway, tourist route (Norway - Sweden - Finland - Russia)
