= Bullmark, Sweden =

Bullmark
- Location within Västerbotten Location within Sweden
- Coordinates: 64°02′N 20°28′E
- Country: Sweden
- Province: Västerbotten
- County: Västerbotten County
- Municipality: Umeå Municipality

Area
  - Total: 0.32 km^{2} (0.12 sq mi)

Population (31 December 2010)
  - Total: 319
  - Density: 985/km^{2} (2,550/sq mi)
- Time zone: UTC+1 (CET)
  - Summer (DST): UTC+2 (CEST)

Bullmark is a locality situated in Umeå Municipality, Västerbotten County, Sweden with 319 inhabitants in 2010.
