= Botsmark =

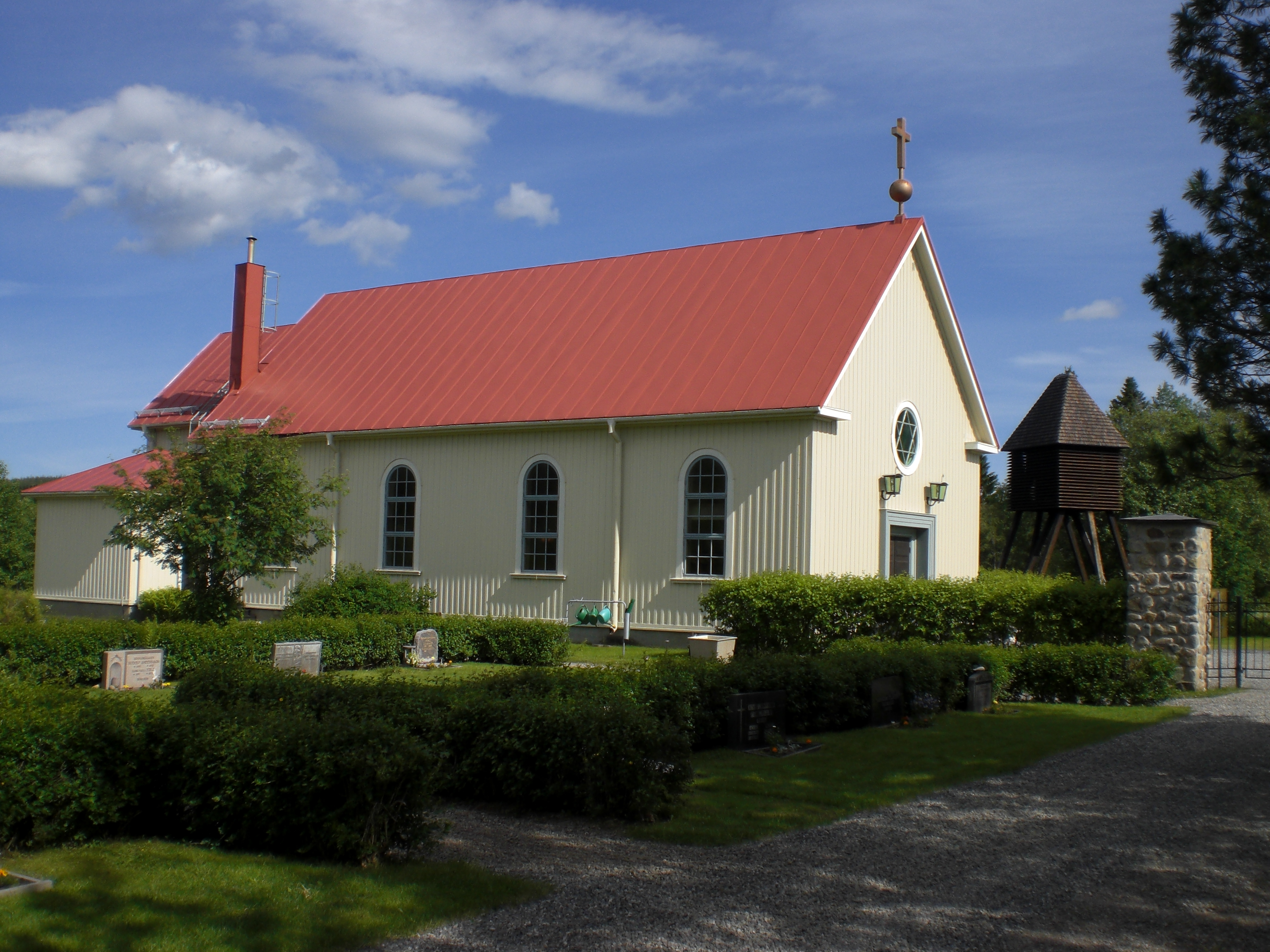
- Botsmark Church in August 2006

- Location within Västerbotten Location within Sweden
- Coordinates: 64°15′N 20°16′E
- Country: Sweden
- Province: Västerbotten
- County: Västerbotten County
- Municipality: Umeå Municipality

Area
  - Total: 0.49 km^{2} (0.19 sq mi)

Population (31 December 2010)
  - Total: 201
  - Density: 413/km^{2} (1,070/sq mi)
- Time zone: UTC+1 (CET)
  - Summer (DST): UTC+2 (CEST)
- Website: www.botsmark.nu

Botsmark is a locality situated in Umeå Municipality, Västerbotten County, Sweden with 201 inhabitants in 2010.
