= Sörfors =

- Location within Västerbotten Location within Sweden
- Coordinates: 63°52′19″N 20°02′08″E
- Country: Sweden
- Province: Västerbotten
- County: Västerbotten County
- Municipality: Umeå Municipality

Area
  - Total: 1.21 km^{2} (0.47 sq mi)

Population (31 December 2010)
  - Total: 403
  - Density: 333/km^{2} (860/sq mi)
- Time zone: UTC+1 (CET)
  - Summer (DST): UTC+2 (CEST)

Sörfors is a locality situated in Umeå Municipality, Västerbotten County, Sweden with 403 inhabitants in 2010.
