= Mariehemsängarna =

Park in Sweden

Coordinates: 63°50′06″N 20°18′57″E

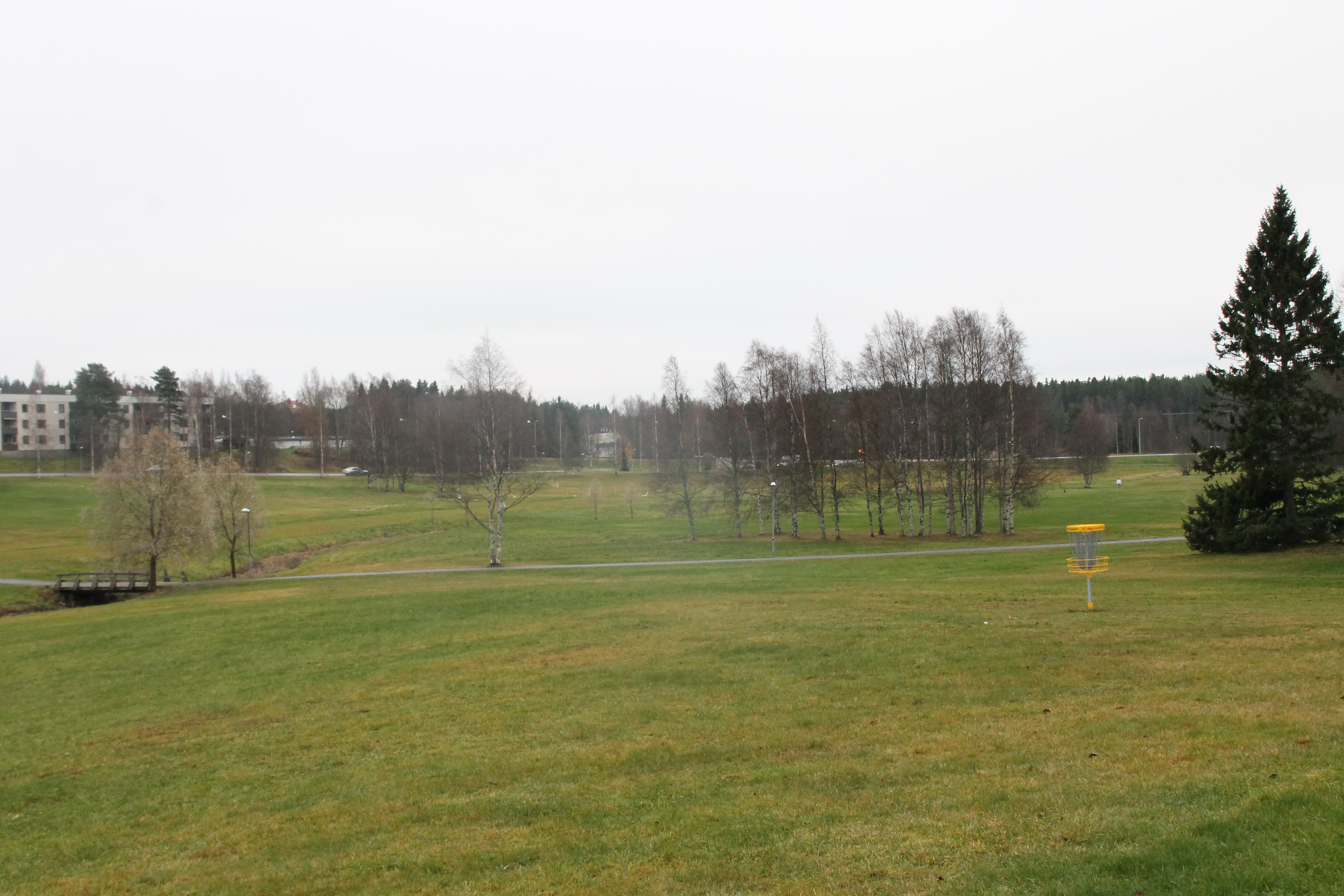
Mariehemsängarna.

Mariehemsängarna is a green area in Umeå, located between Mariehem and Stadsliden. The area is characterized by large lawns. Through the park runs a small river with a few ponds that usually house the swans and ducks in the summer.

== See also ==
- 1974 in the environment
