= Hissjön =

- Location within Västerbotten Location within Sweden
- Coordinates: 63°56′N 20°09′E
- Country: Sweden
- Province: Västerbotten
- County: Västerbotten County
- Municipality: Umeå Municipality

Area
  - Total: 0.76 km^{2} (0.29 sq mi)

Population (31 December 2010)
  - Total: 477
  - Density: 631/km^{2} (1,630/sq mi)
- Time zone: UTC+1 (CET)
  - Summer (DST): UTC+2 (CEST)

Hissjön is a locality situated in Umeå Municipality, Västerbotten County, Sweden with 477 inhabitants in 2010.
