= Djäkneböle =

Coordinates: 63°46′N 20°03′E

Djäkneböle is a small locality situated in Umeå Municipality, Västerbotten County, Sweden, with 161 inhabitants in 2005. The village is situated next to the road between Umeå and Gräsmyr, about 12 kilometer south from Umeå.
