= Flurkmark =

- Interior of Flurkmark Chapel

- Location within Västerbotten Location within Sweden
- Coordinates: 63°59′N 20°15′E
- Country: Sweden
- Province: Västerbotten
- County: Västerbotten County
- Municipality: Umeå Municipality

Area
  - Total: 0.53 km^{2} (0.20 sq mi)

Population (31 December 2010)
  - Total: 291
  - Density: 549/km^{2} (1,420/sq mi)
- Time zone: UTC+1 (CET)
  - Summer (DST): UTC+2 (CEST)

Flurkmark is a locality situated in Umeå Municipality, Västerbotten County, Sweden with 291 inhabitants in 2010.
