= Stöcke =

- Location within Västerbotten Location within Sweden
- Coordinates: 63°44′N 20°13′E
- Country: Sweden
- Province: Västerbotten
- County: Västerbotten County
- Municipality: Umeå Municipality

Area
  - Total: 0.49 km^{2} (0.19 sq mi)

Population (31 December 2010)
  - Total: 483
  - Density: 981/km^{2} (2,540/sq mi)
- Time zone: UTC+1 (CET)
  - Summer (DST): UTC+2 (CEST)

Stöcke is a locality situated in Umeå Municipality, Västerbotten County, Sweden with 483 inhabitants in 2010.
