= Tavelsjö =

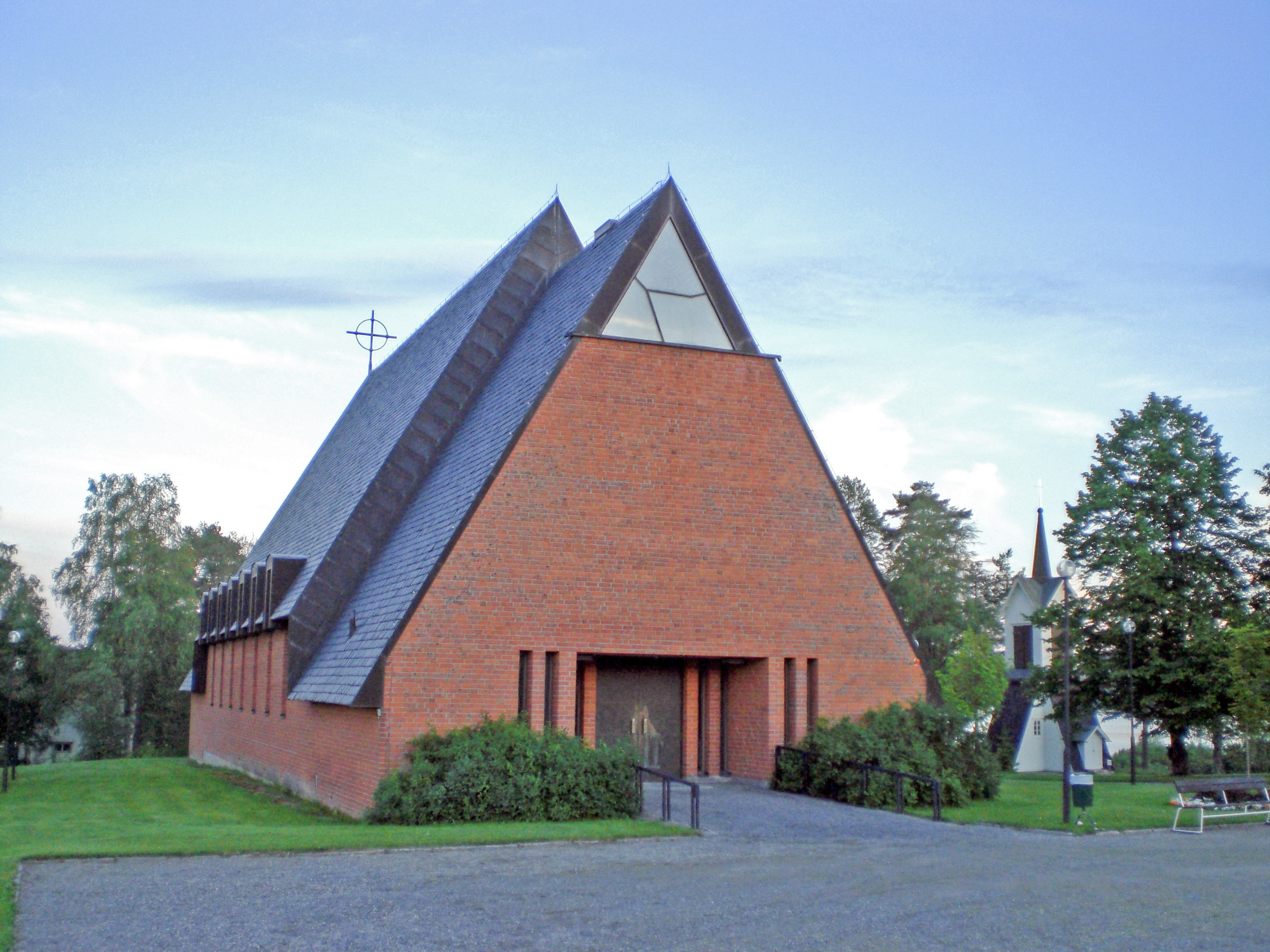
- Tavelsjö Church

- Location within Västerbotten Location within Sweden
- Coordinates: 64°02′N 20°06′E
- Country: Sweden
- Province: Västerbotten
- County: Västerbotten County
- Municipality: Umeå Municipality

Area
  - Total: 0.22 km^{2} (0.085 sq mi)

Population (31 December 2010)
  - Total: 245
  - Density: 1,119/km^{2} (2,900/sq mi)
- Time zone: UTC+1 (CET)
  - Summer (DST): UTC+2 (CEST)

Tavelsjö is a locality situated in Umeå Municipality, Västerbotten County, Sweden with 245 inhabitants in 2010. It is located between Umeå and Vindeln, at the north end of the lake Tavelsjön. Tavelsjö church was consecrated in 1965.
