= Mariehem =

- Residential area
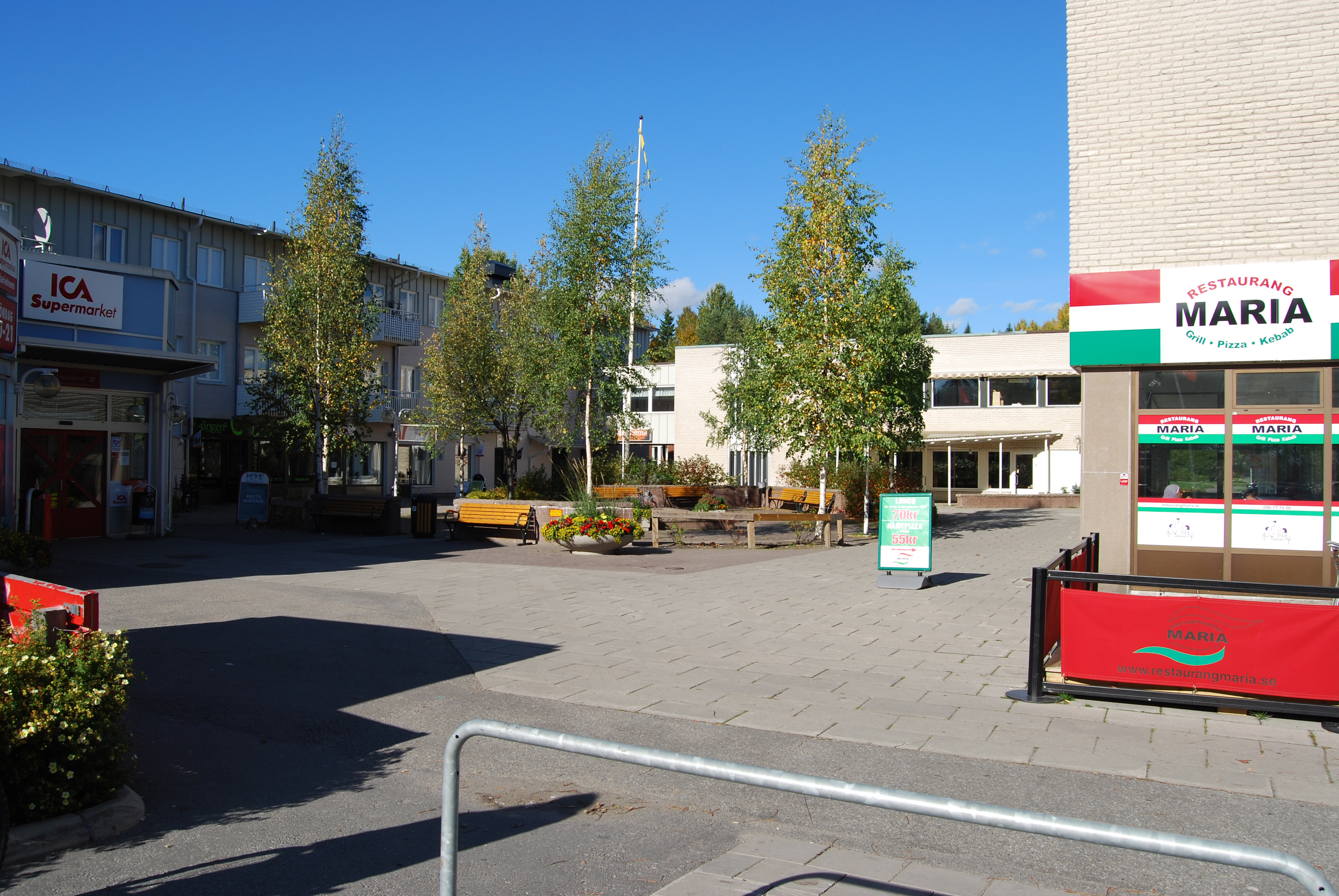
- Interactive map of Mariehem
- Coordinates: 63°50′10″N 20°19′28″E
- Country: Sweden
- Province: Västerbotten
- County: Västerbotten County
- Municipality: Umeå Municipality
- Time zone: UTC+1 (CET)
  - Summer (DST): UTC+2 (CEST)

Mariehem is a residential area in Umeå, Sweden. It is located about 4 km outside the central city, next to the lake Nydalasjön.

The area was built in the 1960s and consist primarily of rental apartments and condominium apartments.

== Sports ==
The following sports clubs are located in Mariehem:

- Mariehem SK

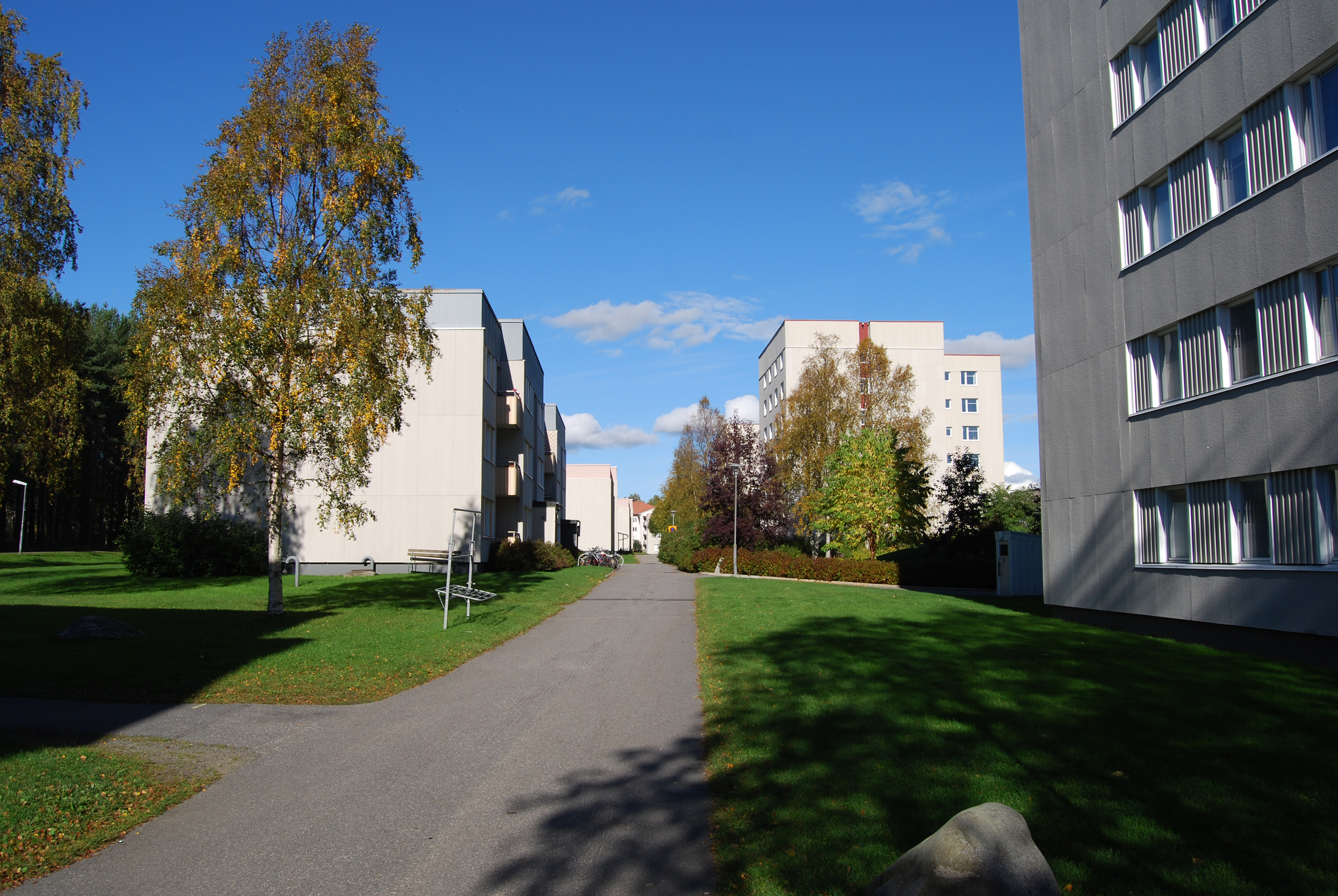
Mariehem in 2010
