= Sörmjöle =

- Location within Västerbotten Location within Sweden
- Coordinates: 63°41′N 20°00′E
- Country: Sweden
- Province: Västerbotten
- County: Västerbotten County
- Municipality: Umeå Municipality

Area
  - Total: 0.26 km^{2} (0.10 sq mi)

Population (31 December 2010)
  - Total: 212
  - Density: 810/km^{2} (2,100/sq mi)
- Time zone: UTC+1 (CET)
  - Summer (DST): UTC+2 (CEST)

Sörmjöle is a locality situated in Umeå Municipality, Västerbotten County, Sweden with 212 inhabitants in 2010.
