= Gravmark =

Village in Umeå municipality, Sweden

- Village
- Location within Västerbotten Location within Sweden
- Coordinates: 64°07′04″N 20°23′26″E
- Country: Sweden
- County: Västerbotten County
- Municipality: Umeå Municipality
- Time zone: UTC+1 (CET)
  - Summer (DST): UTC+2 (CEST)

Gravmark is a village in Umeå Municipality, Sweden.
