= Innertavle =

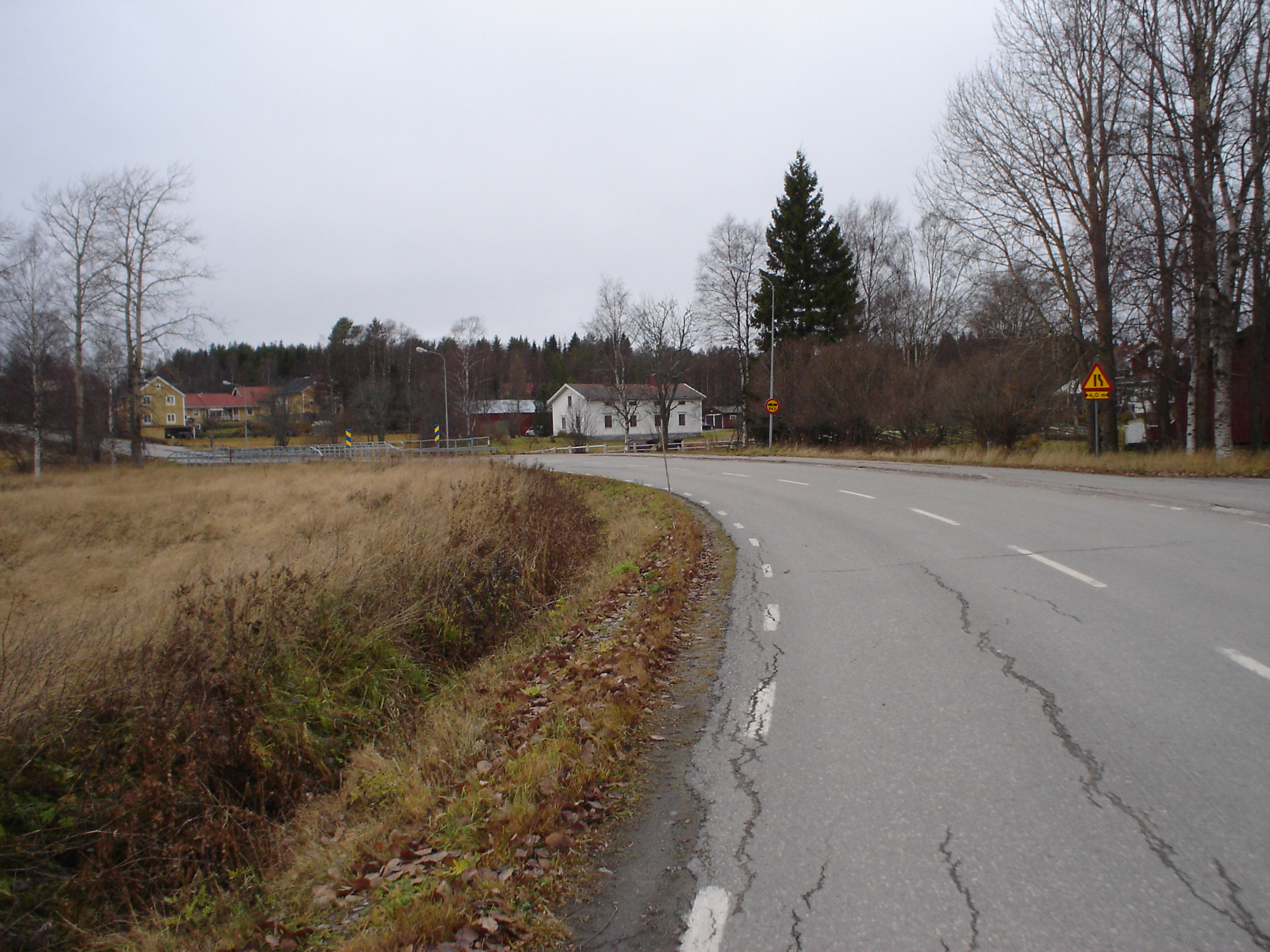

- Location within Västerbotten Location within Sweden
- Coordinates: 63°48′N 20°24′E
- Country: Sweden
- Province: Västerbotten
- County: Västerbotten County
- Municipality: Umeå Municipality

Area
  - Total: 0.54 km^{2} (0.21 sq mi)

Population (31 December 2010)
  - Total: 582
  - Density: 1,079/km^{2} (2,790/sq mi)
- Time zone: UTC+1 (CET)
  - Summer (DST): UTC+2 (CEST)

Innertavle is a locality situated in Umeå Municipality, Västerbotten County, Sweden with 582 inhabitants in 2010.
