= Nydalasjön =

Lake in Umeå, Sweden

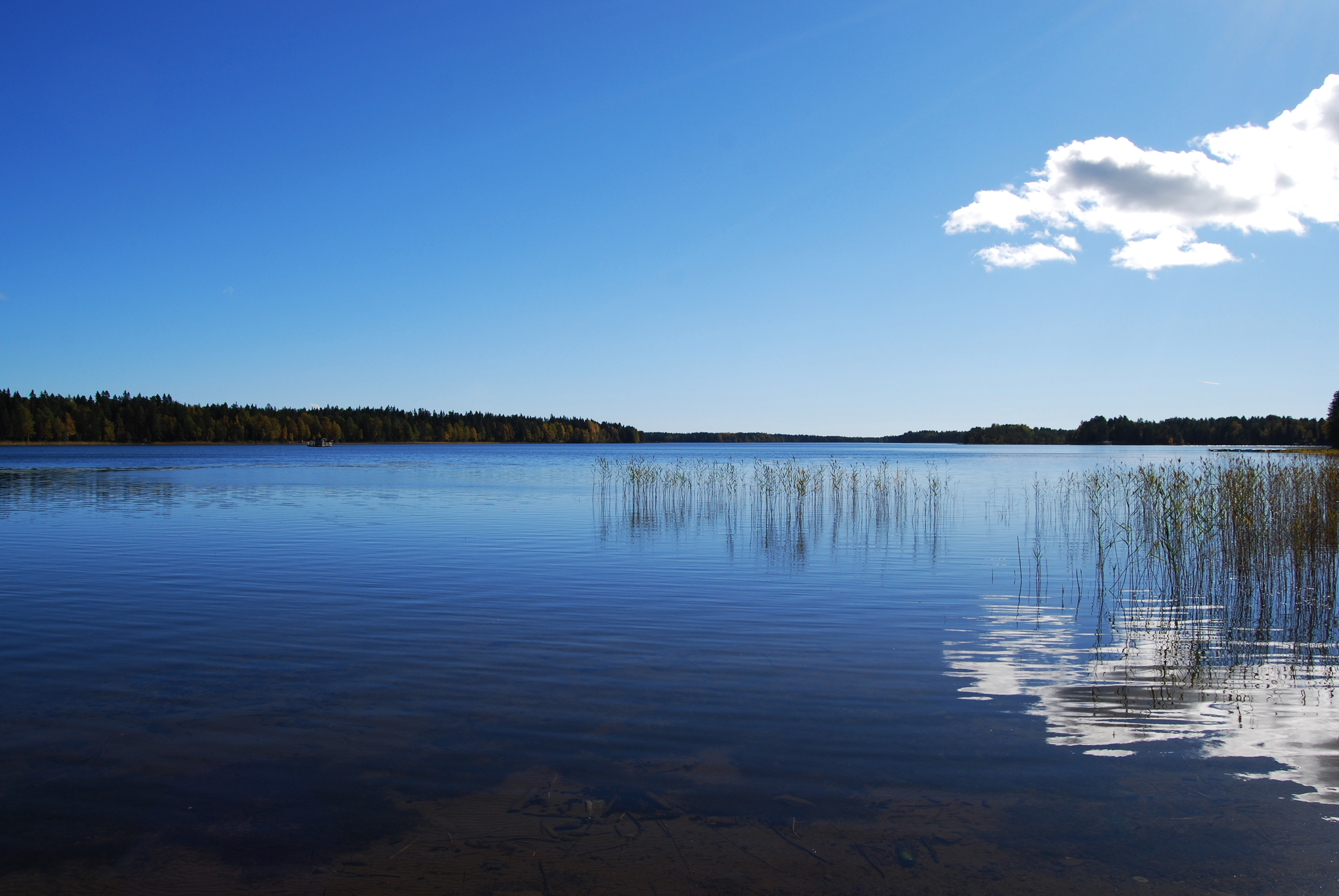
- Nydalasjön in September 2010

- Location within Västerbotten Location within Sweden
- Location: Umeå Municipality, Västerbotten County
- Coordinates: 63°49′18.36″N 20°20′51.24″E
- Primary outflows: Kolbäcken
- Basin countries: Sweden
- Max. length: about 3 km (1.9 mi)
- Max. width: about 0.7 km (0.43 mi)
- Surface area: 1.4604 km^{2} (0.5639 mi^{2})
- Average depth: 3 m (9.8 ft)
- Max. depth: 6 m (20 ft)
- Water volume: 0.004784 km^{3} (0.001148 mi^{3})
- Surface elevation: 35.9 m (118 ft)
- Settlements: Umeå

Nydalasjön, previously known as Tavlesjön, is a lake in Umeå, Sweden. Located a few kilometers outside the central city, Nydalasjön is adjacent to the residential areas Mariehem, Nydalahöjd and Tomtebo.

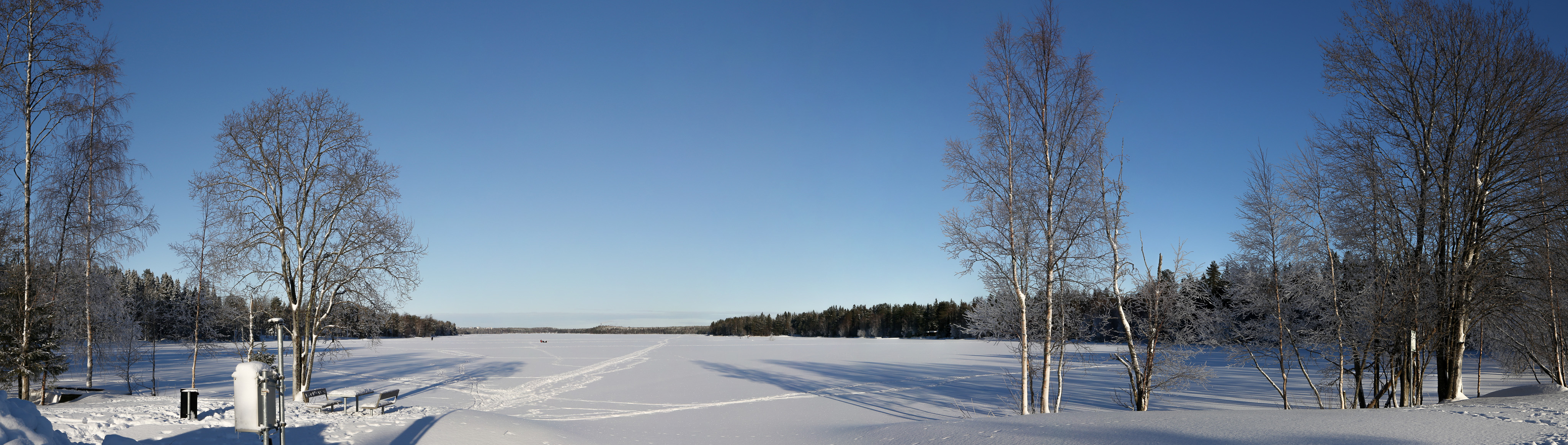
View of Nydalasjön from the south end in feb 2013

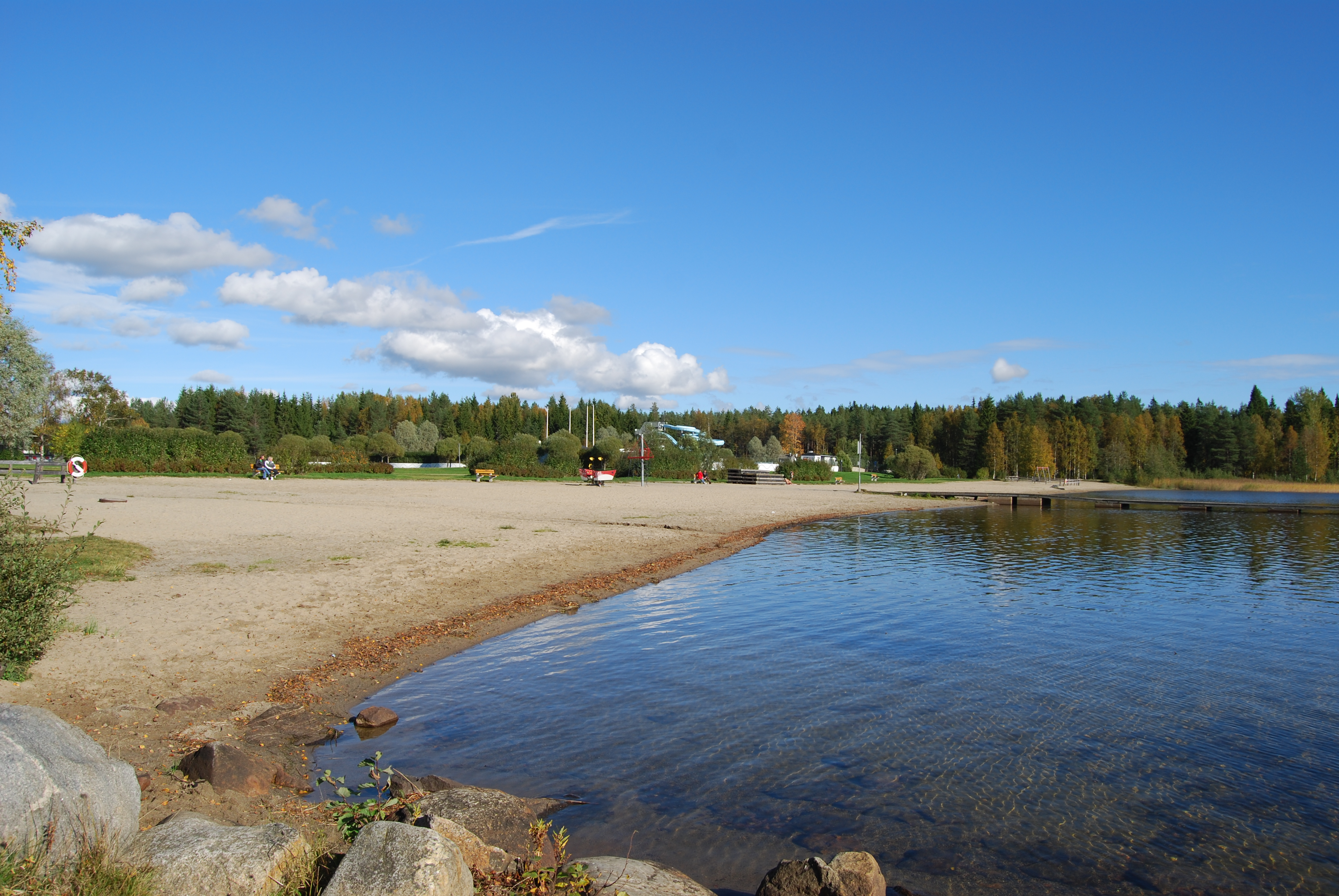
Nydalabadet

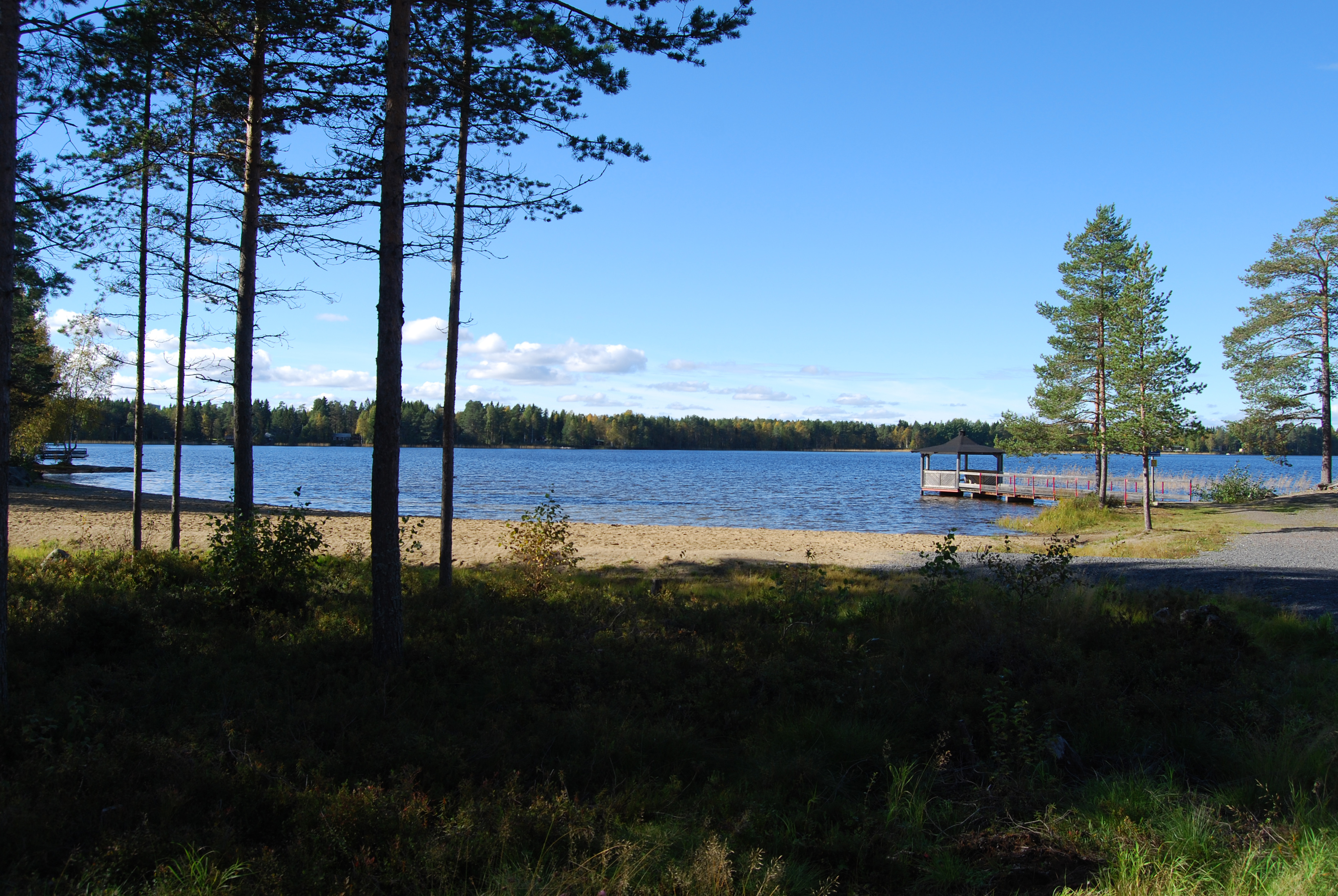
Kärleksviken

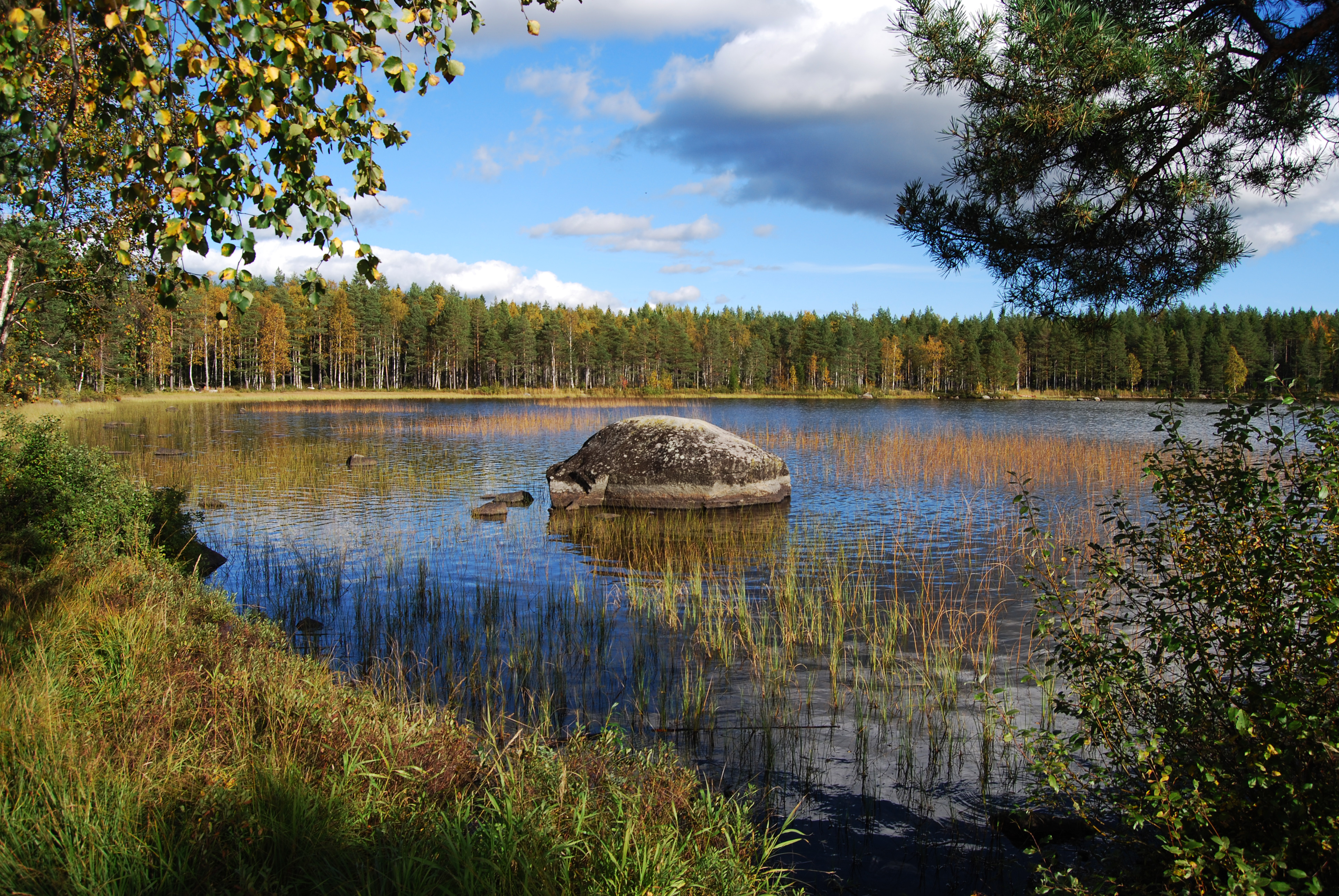
Nydalasjön
