= Björksele =

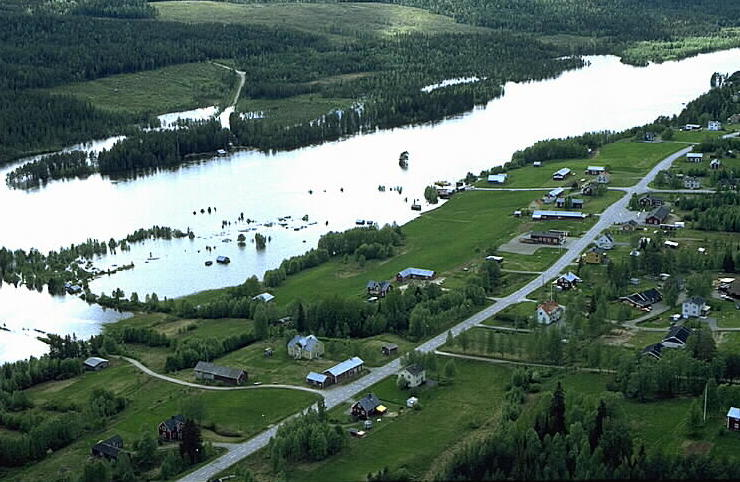

- Location within Sweden
- Coordinates: 64°59′16″N 18°31′55″E
- Country: Sweden
- Province: Lappland
- County: Västerbotten County
- Municipality: Lycksele Municipality

Area
  - Total: 0.49 km^{2} (0.19 sq mi)

Population (31 December 2005)
  - Total: 106
  - Density: 216/km^{2} (560/sq mi)
- Time zone: UTC+1 (CET)
  - Summer (DST): UTC+2 (CEST)

Björksele is a town located in Västerbotten, Sweden.
