= Rickleån =

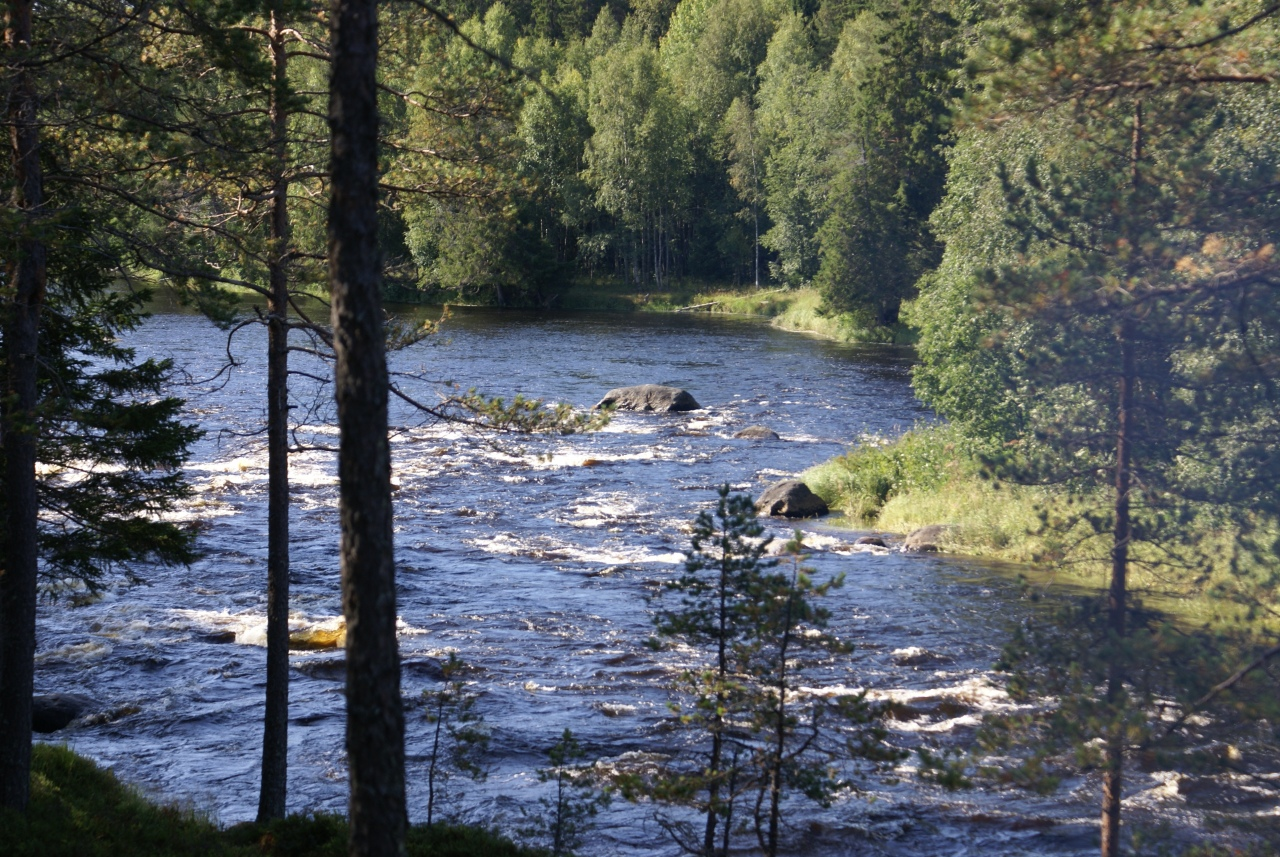

Location
- Country: Sweden
- County: Västerbotten

Physical characteristics
- Mouth: Bothnian Bay
  - coordinates: 64°04′55″N 20°56′35″E
  - elevation: 0 m (0 ft)
- Length: 110 km (68 mi)
- Basin size: 1,648.9 km^{2} (636.6 sq mi)

The Rickleån is a river in Västerbotten County, in northern Sweden.
