= Ersmark, Umeå Municipality =

Ersmark
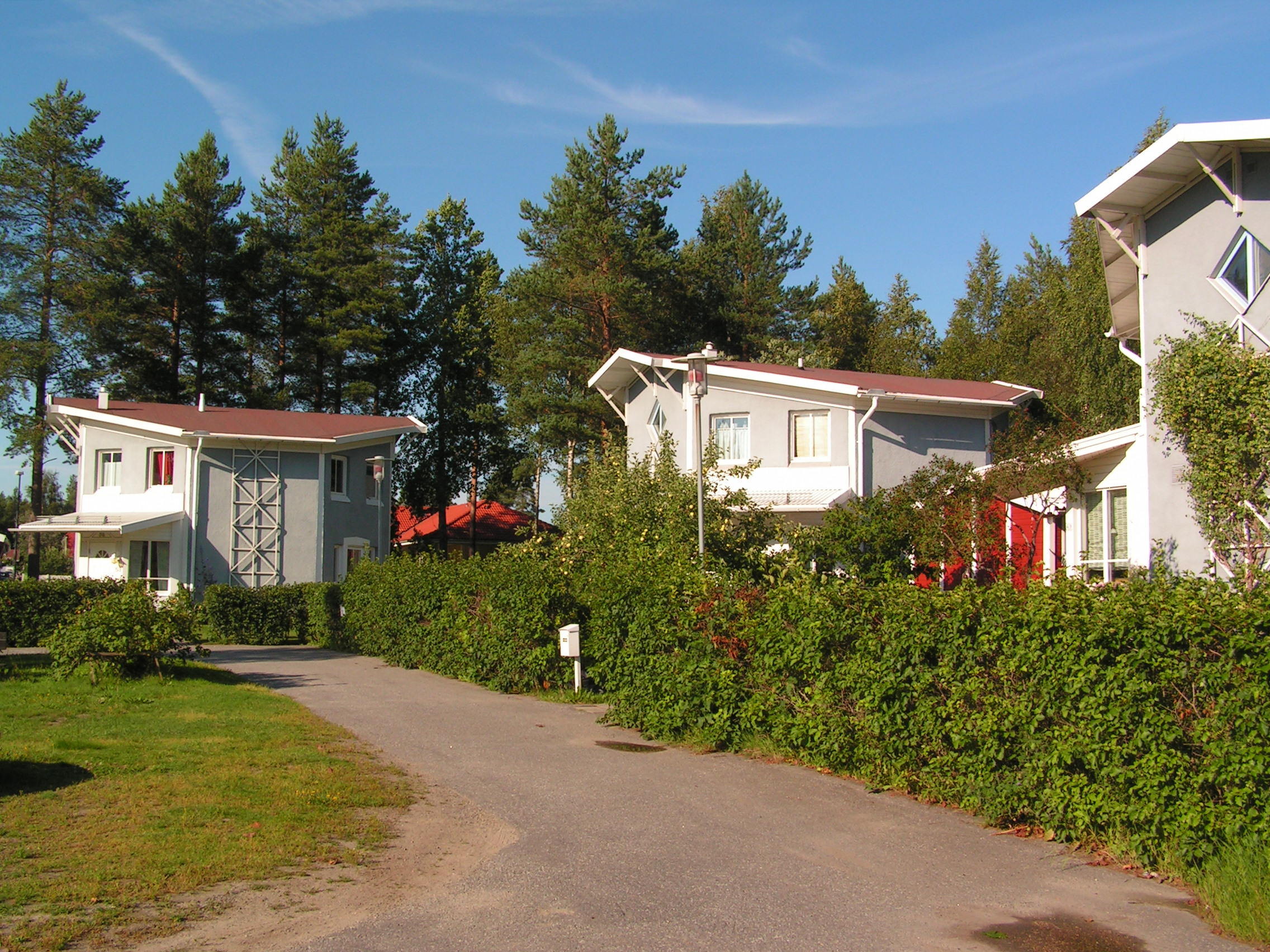
- Oktagonhusen in Ersmark

- Location within Västerbotten Location within Sweden
- Coordinates: 63°53′N 20°19′E
- Country: Sweden
- Province: Västerbotten
- County: Västerbotten County
- Municipality: Umeå Municipality

Area
  - Total: 1.21 km^{2} (0.47 sq mi)

Population (31 December 2010)
  - Total: 1,613
  - Density: 1,337/km^{2} (3,460/sq mi)
- Time zone: UTC+1 (CET)
  - Summer (DST): UTC+2 (CEST)

Ersmark is a villiage situated north of Umeå Municipality, Västerbotten County, Sweden with 1,613 inhabitants in 2010.
