= Byske (river) =

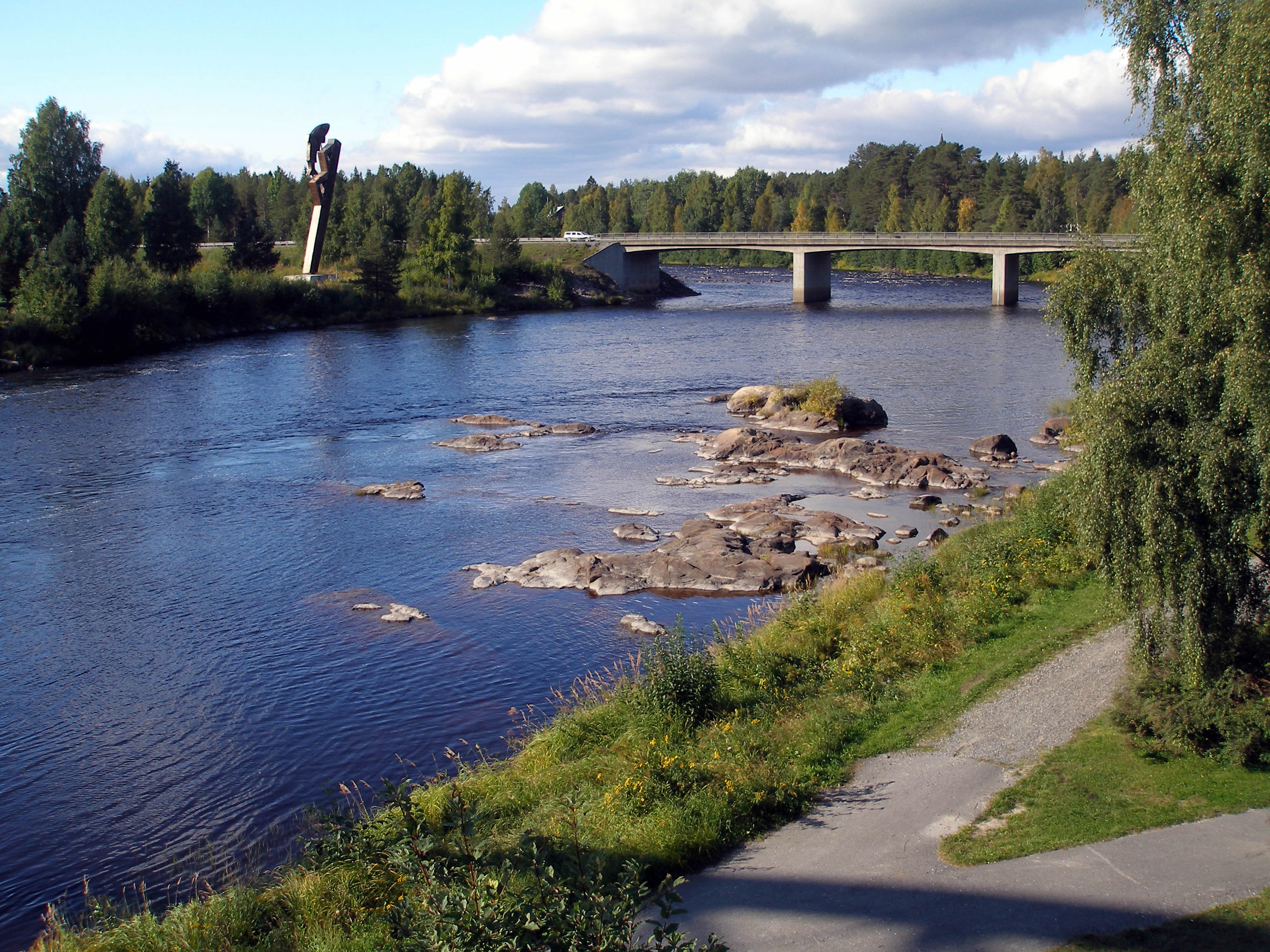
- Native name: Byskeälven (Swedish)

Location
- Country: Sweden

Physical characteristics
- Mouth: Gulf of Bothnia
  - coordinates: 64°56′33″N 21°14′00″E
  - elevation: 0 m (0 ft)
- Length: 215 km (134 mi)
- Basin size: 3,661.8 km^{2} (1,413.8 sq mi)
- Discharge
  - average: 40 m^{3}/s (1,400 cu ft/s)

The Byske (Swedish: Byskeälven) is a river in Sweden.

== General Information ==
The Byske River is a 215 km long undeveloped wild salmon river located in the area of Northern Sweden formerly known as the Norrland County. It stretches 134 miles from the Gulf of Bothnia to the Kilver in Arvidsjaur Municipality, passing through the current counties of Västerbotten and Norrbotten. The river is largely surrounded by dense forests and marshland. It is one of the few rivers in Sweden that still possesses its original strain of Baltic Salmon. It is a common fishing location known for its large salmon and trout populations and fishery conservation area. The river offers multiple fishing sites with widths ranging between 40 and 80 meters and an average flow velocity of approximately 41m3/s. Approximately 40 km of the river contains rapids and/or currents which can be quite powerful.

== History ==
The Byske River, also called Byskealyen, gets its name from the word Byskio which means "the swelling". The use of the Byske River for log driving during the 20th century greatly impacted the river's biology and led to the implementation of several restoration measures including strict regulations by the European Union protecting the water environment and freshwater mussels. A few power stations once operated in localities near the Byske, such as Fällfors and Åselet im Västerbotten but these stations have since been demolished and a hydroelectric ban put in place. In December 1989, the Västerbotten portion of the Byske River's Fishery Conservation Area, the largest of its type in Sweden, was completed. This area extended from the mouth of the Byske River in the Gulf of Bothnia to Norrbotten County's border and allowed the public to fish on this entire stretch of river with just one fishing license. Prior to 2011, Skellefteå Municipality carried out multiple river restoration projects on and around the Byske in hopes of improving fishing tourism including biological restoration in rivers and streams, the development of a fish ladder, salmon observatory and bridge, and a fish migration fish migration monitor. As a result, between the years of 2011 and 2015, the number of salmon caught increased significantly. Currently, the Byskeälven fishing conservation area has five lakes where fish are regularly placed. These lakes are Perch Iron, Blanktrasket, Vastra Skalietjarnen, and Ostra Skaljetjarmen.

== Wildlife ==
The Byske River is home to freshwater mussels and several different species of fish. Some fish species found in the Byske River include Baltic Salmon, Brown trout, Rainbow trout, Arctic grayling, Perch, Arctic char, Esox, Freshwater whitefish, Sea trout, Ide (fish), and Burbot. Some species, such as the Chinese mitten crab, are invasive and should not be released back into the wild if caught. Other animals that can be found within the section of Northern Sweden that the Byske River flows through include Moose, Bear, Arctic fox, Lynx, Otter, and Hare. Insects such as the Mosquito and Gnat are common during the summer season around the Byske River.

== Fishing ==
Fishers interested in the Byske River can find information on rules, regulations, and/or procedures surrounding fishing, fishing licensing, and permanent fishing bans and closures below.

=== Fishing Licensing ===
- All fishers, including children, must possess and carry a fishing license to fish in the Byske River and/or surrounding tributaries.
- To fish along the entire river, 2 licenses will be required, one for the river's length in Vasterbotten and one for the length of the river in Norrbotten.
- Fishers who fail to comply with fishing rules and regulations can be suspended and their fishing license revoked.
- Fishing license for the Byske River can be bought online at IFiske or at locations such as Gästis Byske, Sportbutiken Byske, Byske Camping, Fällfors camping and/or private sellers located above the Fallfors. Accommodation can also be offered at Fallfors.
- As of May 2020, fishers must obtain a small fishing license to catch pike, perch, and/or whitefish around the area of Aselet. A day pass of this license can be bought for 60 SEK.
- Children under the age of 18 can fish for free.

==== Fishing Rules/Regulations for Release Lakes ====
- In release lakes with exposed fish, fishing is permitted all year round.
- Each fisher is only permitted to use one rod at a time when fishing in release lakes.
- The only types of fishing permitted within release lakes are land and ice fishing.
- There is a limit of 3 fish per day for Rainbow trout, trout, and char when fishing in release lakes.

==== Fishing Rules/Regulations Outside of Release Lakes ====
- Fishers are not permitted to catch more than 5 salmon and 5 trout per year.
- Fishers are not permitted to catch and keep more than 5 Greyling's per day.
- Fishers are only permitted to kill salmon between June 19 and August 1 or between August 1 and August 31 assuming that the salmon are between 50 and 63 cm.
- Trout may be killed throughout the season only if they measure 50–63 cm.
- Fishers may not kill wrong-hooked fish unless it is an invasive species.
- Fishers are not permitted to possess or use paw length greater than 2 meters when flyfishing.

===== Permanent Fishing Bans and Closures =====
- All fishing is prohibited between September 1 and December 31.
- Between the times of 06:00 and 18:00 in the month of June, all fishing is banned in the area between the Blue Iron Bridge and the wooden suspension bridge. At all other times during June, only single hook fishing is permitted within this area.
- All fishing is prohibited all year round in the area surrounding the Fallforsen. For reference, this area extends 100 meters downstream of the water discharge into the fishery and approximately 50 meters of the water intake.

== Weather ==
Byske River generally experiences temperatures of 0–10 degrees Celsius at night and 15–25 degrees Celsius during the day throughout fishing season. Rain can occur as often as every week.
