= Dalkarlsån =

River in Västerbotten, Sweden

Coordinates: 64°02′N 20°54′E

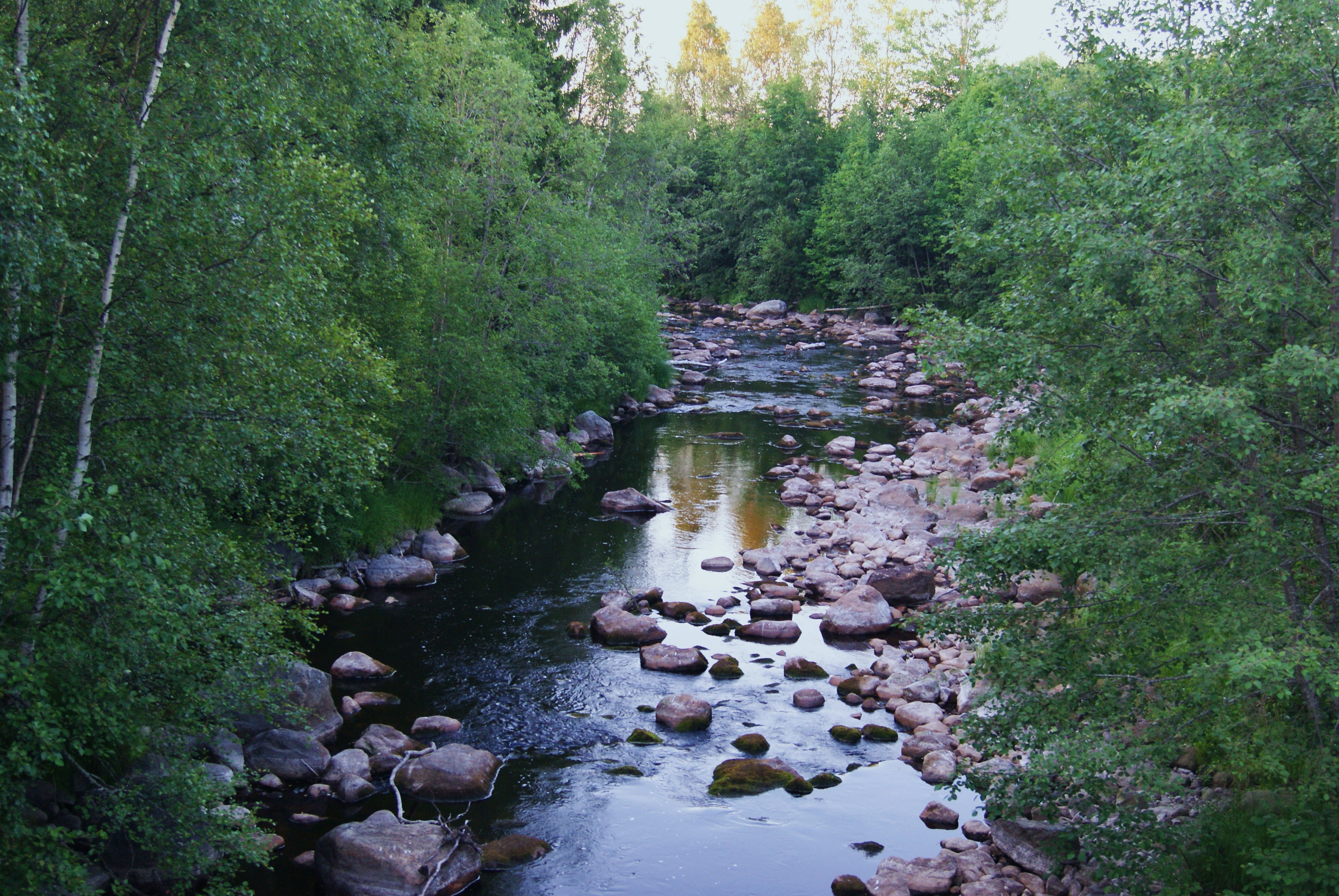

Location
- Country: Sweden
- County: Västerbotten

Physical characteristics
- Length: 50 km (31 mi)
- Basin size: 346.5 km^{2} (133.8 sq mi)

Dalkarlsån is a river in Sweden located in Västerbotten. The river is around 50 kilometers in length, with a river basin spanning 346.5 kilometers.
