= Vänortsparken =

Park in Umeå, Sweden

Coordinates: 63°49′28″N 20°16′6″E

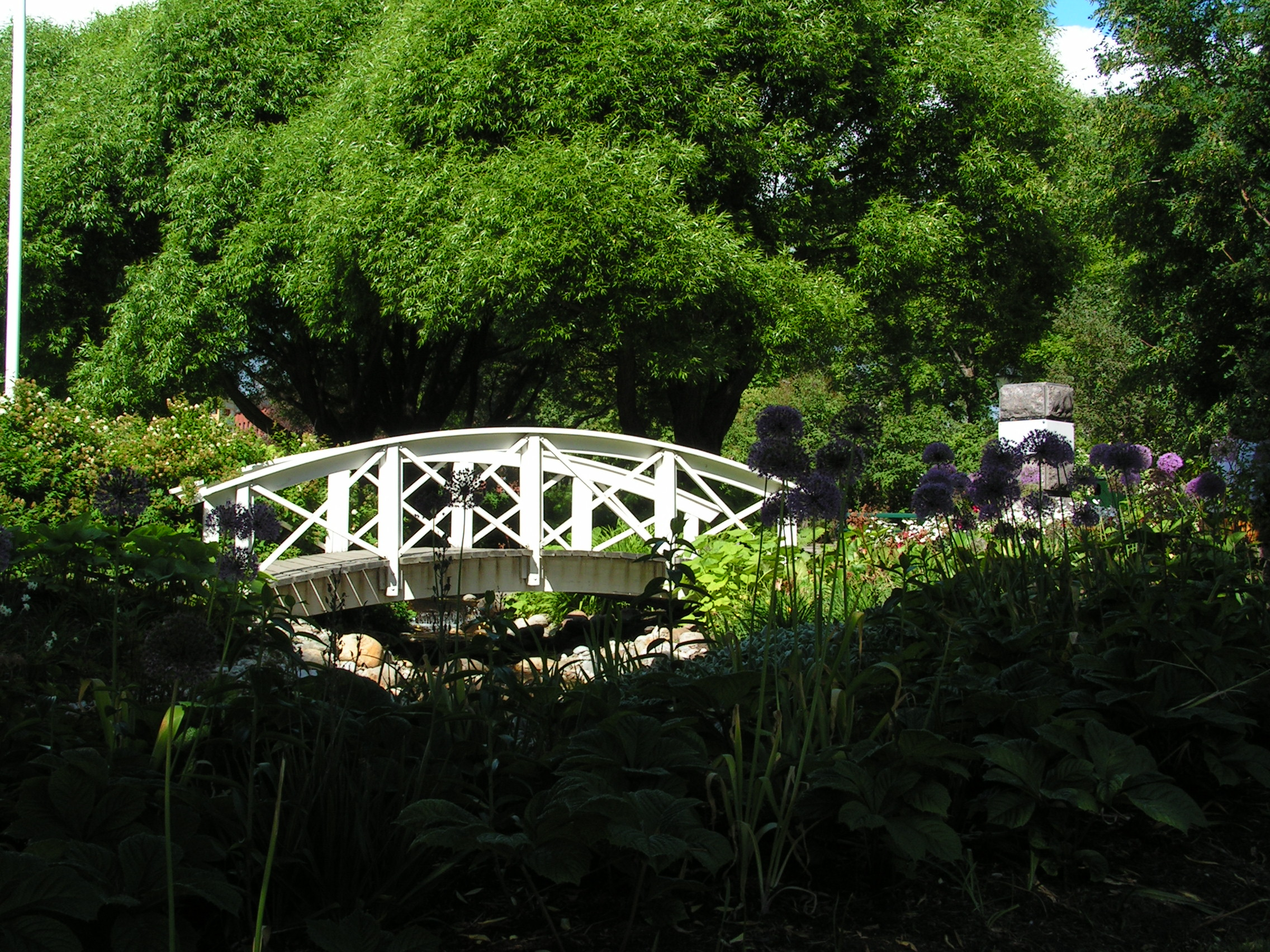
Bridge in Vänortsparken

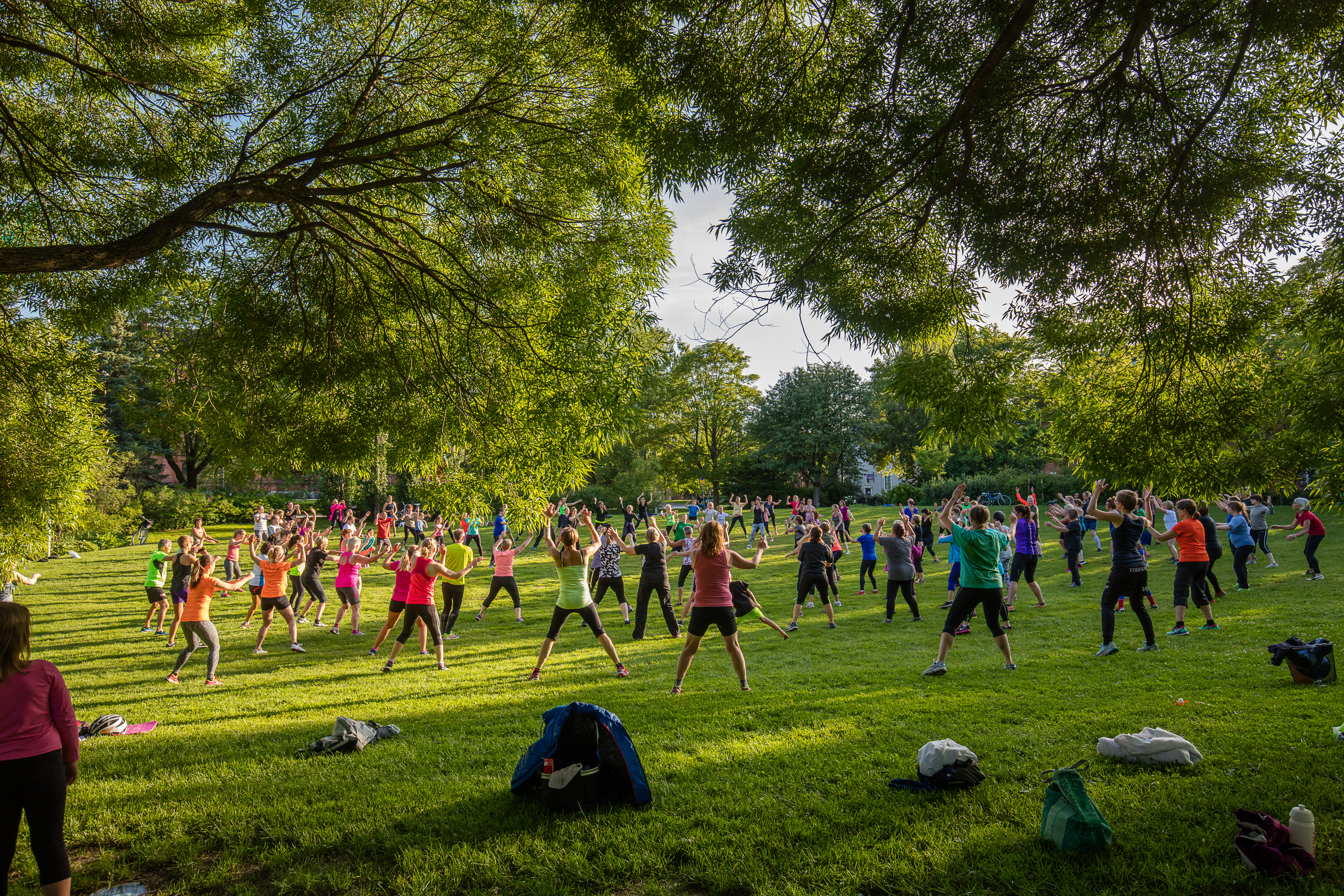
Outdoor training in Vänortsparken

Vänortsparken (English: Twin Towns' Park), is a park in central Umeå, Västerbotten County, Sweden.

== History ==
The park was constructed in 1858 on the initiative of the Umeå Garden Society (which was founded in 1851). However, the park was destroyed by a devastating town fire in 1888. It was rebuilt and it got its present shape and present name in 1985 after a major reconstruction. At that time a man-made stream in the eastern and northern parts was added to the greenery and paved and furnished spots were dedicated to the six twin towns of Umeå. These spots were decorated with artifacts that symbolize each town: Helsingør in Denmark, Vaasa in Finland, Petrozavodsk in Russia, Harstad in Norway, Würzburg in Germany and Saskatoon in Canada.

The sculpture Tellus by artist Ante Dahlstedt, is in the form of a globe with the location of the six twin towns marked. It was also raised in 1985 and it illustrates the twin town theme of the park.

The park area is surrounded by lines of Norway maple. Other trees species are inter alia Swiss pine, mountain pine, Alpine currant, European ash and horse-chestnut. There is also an Ornäs birch (Betula pendula 'Dalecarlica'), the Swedish national tree, planted in 1985. Until 1925 the park was the city's main football field. The older names of the area are Kyrktorget (Church Square) and Skolparken (School Park).
