= Åby (river) =

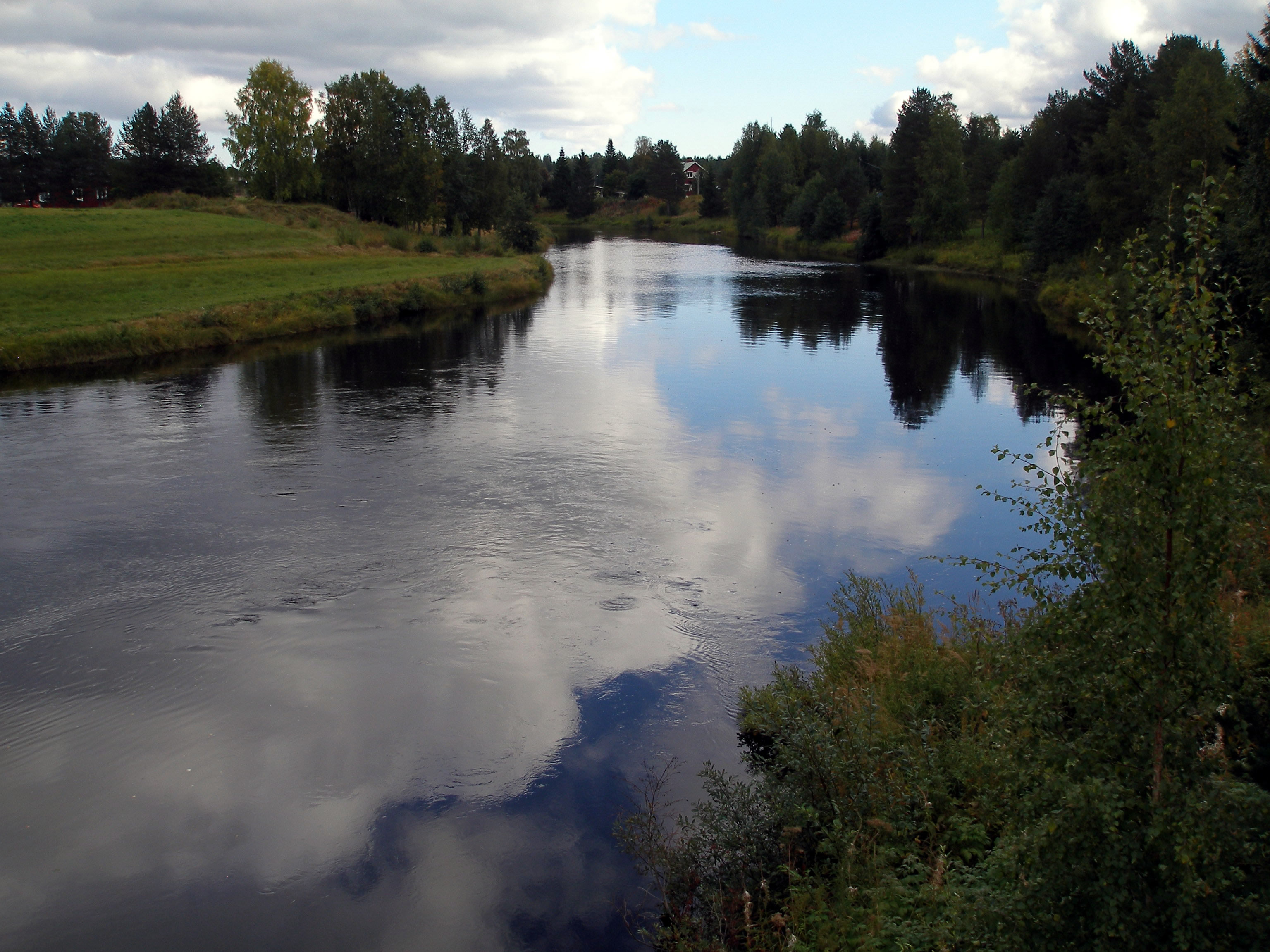

- Location in Sweden
- Native name: Åbyälven (Swedish)

Location
- Country: Sweden

Physical characteristics
- Length: 150 km (93 mi)
- Basin size: 1,343.9 km^{2} (518.9 sq mi)

The Åby (Swedish: Åbyälven) is a river in Sweden.
