= Umeå Municipality =

Umeå Municipality Umeå kommun
- Municipality
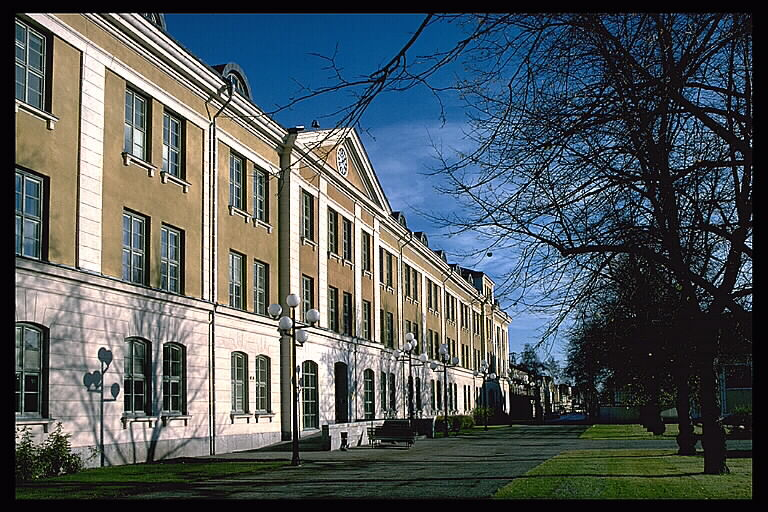
- Umeå City Hall

- Coat of arms

- Coordinates: 63°50′N 20°15′E
- Country: Sweden
- County: Västerbotten County
- Seat: Umeå

Area
  - Total: 5,214.16 km^{2} (2,013.20 sq mi)
  - Land: 2,316.61 km^{2} (894.45 sq mi)
  - Water: 2,897.55 km^{2} (1,118.75 sq mi)
- Area as of 1 January 2014.

Population (30 June 2025)
  - Total: 133,833
  - Density: 57.7711/km^{2} (149.626/sq mi)
- Time zone: UTC+1 (CET)
  - Summer (DST): UTC+2 (CEST)
- ISO 3166 code: SE
- Province: Västerbotten and Ångermanland
- Municipal code: 2480
- Website: www.umea.se/umeakommun

Umeå Municipality (Swedish: Umeå kommun; Ume Sámi: Upmejen tjïelte or Ubmejen kommuvdna; Meänkieli and Finnish: Uumajan kunta) is a municipality in Västerbotten County in northern Sweden. Its seat is Umeå, which is also the county seat of Västerbotten County.

== Administration ==
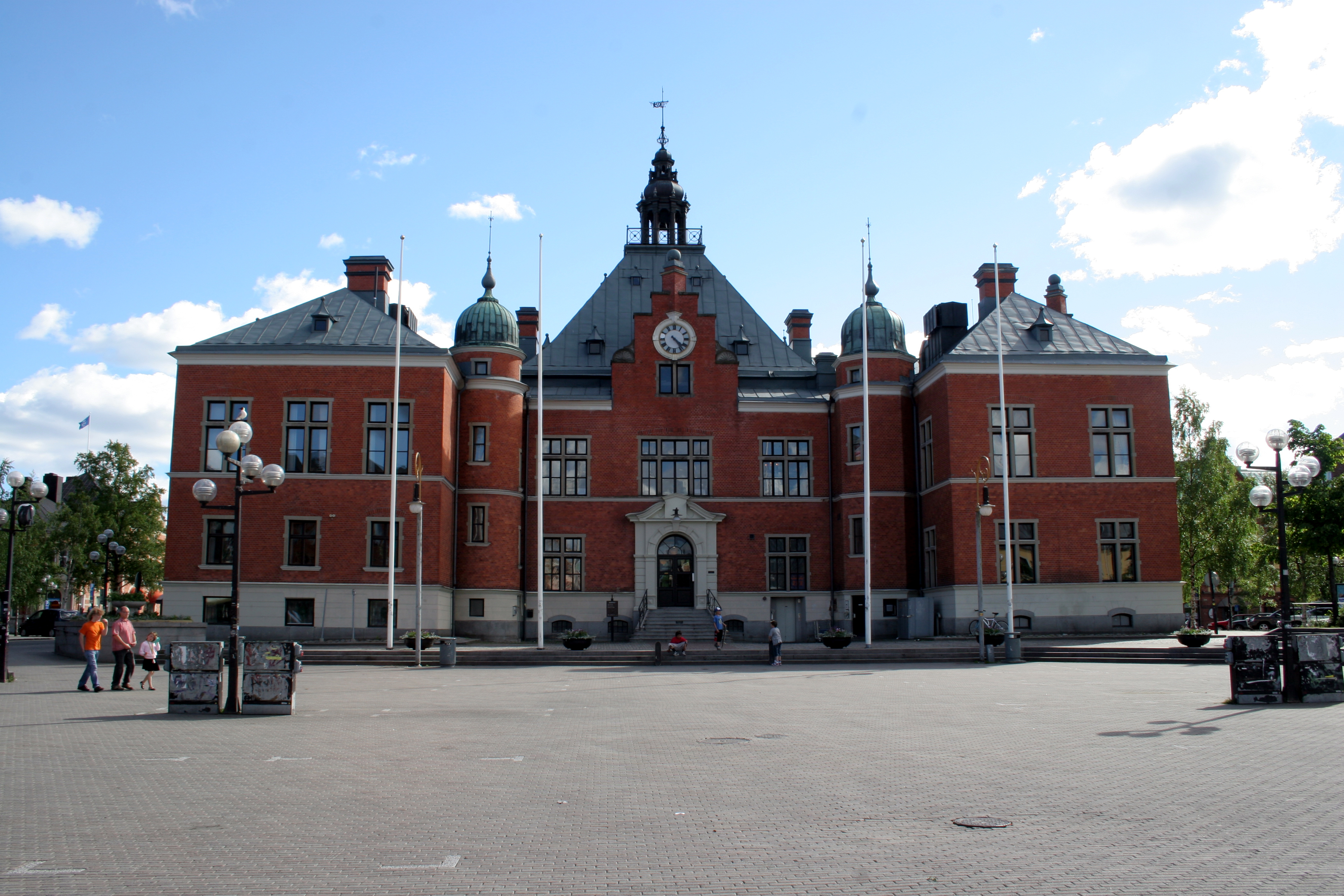
Umeå Town Hall

The municipality is an administrative entity defined by geographical borders, consisting of Umeå and a large area around it. The present municipality consists of many former local government units joined in a series of municipal reforms carried out between 1952 and 1974.

A 65-member municipal assembly (kommunfullmäktige) is elected by proportional representation for a four-year term. The assembly appoints the 9-member executive committee (kommunstyrelsen) and the 7 governing commissioners. The executive committee and the commissioners are headed by the chairman (kommunstyrelsens ordförande), since 1996 Social Democrat Lennart Holmlund (b. 1946). Since the 2010 municipal election the municipality is headed by a Social Democratic-Left Party coalition a single seat short of absolute majority. Of the eight parties represented in the Riksdag since 2010, all but the Sweden Democrats are found in the assembly, as well as the breakaway Socialist Justice Party headed by former Social Democrat Jan Hägglund (holding its only seat), renamed the Workers' Party in 2011.

== Localities ==
There are 20 localities (or urban areas) in Umeå Municipality:

#	Locality	Population
1	**Umeå**	75,645
2	Holmsund	5,482
3	Sävar	2,672
4	Hörnefors	2,573
5	Röbäck	2,300
6	Obbola	2,175
7	Ersmark	1,486
8	Täfteå	1,029
9	Tomtebo	633
10	Innertavle	549
11	Stöcke	477
12	Hissjön	447
13	Sörfors	397
14	Bullmark	343
15	Flurkmark	302
16	Tavelsjö	247
17	Sörmjöle	231
18	Västibyn	219
19	Botsmark	209
20	Stöcksjö	205

The municipal seat in bold

Other villages:

- Brännland
- Gravmark
- Gunnismark

== Demographics ==
This is a demographic table based on Umeå Municipality's electoral districts in the 2022 Swedish general election sourced from SVT's election platform, in turn taken from SCB official statistics.

In total there were 130,881 residents, including 99,226 Swedish citizens of voting age. 65.9% voted for the left coalition and 32.9% for the right coalition. Indicators are in percentage points except population totals and income. Umeå was the strongest municipality in Sweden for the left coalition, with a 33-point margin of advantage.

Location	Residents	Citizen adults	Left vote	Right vote	Employed	Swedish parents	Foreign heritage	Income SEK	Degree
Location			%	%					
Backen	1,314	1,046	65.7	33.8	85	93	7	26,144	60
Berghem N	2,218	1,685	71.4	27.4	71	84	16	25,876	76
Berghem S	1,237	1,035	75.4	23.7	68	83	17	21,671	75
Brinkvägen	1,322	1,180	61.0	38.0	80	89	11	24,094	58
Brännland	2,564	1,856	56.6	42.6	88	94	6	30,227	50
Bullmark	1,309	1,010	54.1	45.1	85	94	6	25,906	34
Böleå	1,796	1,650	58.7	40.5	82	92	8	25,203	46
Böleäng V	2,332	1,665	63.0	35.8	86	89	11	30,118	51
Böleäng Ö	1,680	1,257	63.6	35.6	85	88	12	28,486	53
Carlshem V	2,621	1,974	72.7	25.9	71	78	22	24,178	68
Carlshem Ö	1,584	1,149	73.1	25.6	68	74	26	22,804	64
Centrum	1,260	1,185	63.8	35.8	75	84	16	24,977	56
Centrum V	1,898	1,647	65.5	33.4	81	88	12	26,064	56
Centrum Ö	1,747	1,455	68.4	30.4	78	87	13	25,500	68
Dragonfältet	1,190	1,101	61.8	37.4	86	90	10	28,262	60
Ersboda M	2,182	1,585	72.2	25.9	73	70	30	22,911	41
Ersboda N	2,392	1,531	71.9	26.0	70	55	45	21,647	36
Ersboda V	2,302	1,708	69.6	29.4	78	78	22	25,511	48
Ersboda Ö	1,160	816	68.7	29.4	79	68	32	25,641	45
Ersmark	1,829	1,270	58.5	41.0	91	94	6	33,672	62
Grubbe N	1,676	1,298	59.6	39.6	83	93	7	29,367	56
Grubbe S	2,045	1,622	65.9	33.4	84	92	8	29,251	61
Haga N	1,534	1,348	69.3	29.8	77	90	10	24,702	63
Haga S	1,587	1,342	68.2	30.6	80	88	12	27,717	62
Haga Ö	1,574	1,333	69.1	29.7	77	88	12	24,461	64
Hissjö	1,358	1,033	55.0	44.6	91	95	5	29,640	47
Holmsund S	2,419	1,762	61.9	37.6	90	92	8	30,332	55
Holmsund V	2,047	1,508	63.6	35.0	76	84	16	23,301	40
Holmsund Ö	2,044	1,452	66.1	33.2	86	88	12	28,143	53
Hörnefors V	1,969	1,544	56.9	42.3	84	93	7	24,929	36
Hörnefors Ö	1,321	1,022	65.9	32.4	89	96	4	27,560	43
Innertavle-Tavleliden	2,376	1,485	65.8	33.6	91	89	11	34,467	69
Kronoparken	1,724	1,360	65.2	33.8	85	92	8	27,696	52
Marieberg	1,966	1,382	70.6	28.3	80	83	17	27,365	58
Mariedal	1,578	1,271	70.4	28.3	87	90	10	27,762	65
Mariehem	1,922	1,410	75.5	23.3	79	78	22	26,711	67
Mariehemshöjd	1,988	1,365	70.2	27.0	69	61	39	20,284	49
Mariestrand Olovsdal	2,303	1,976	66.2	32.9	61	78	22	18,838	67
Nydalahöjd	1,662	1,321	73.4	25.0	48	71	29	7,859	77
Obbola	2,851	2,132	63.4	36.1	87	90	10	28,808	46
Röbäck V-Skravelsjö	1,585	1,114	62.9	36.6	84	89	11	29,286	44
Röbäck Ö-Klabböle	1,463	1,026	57.8	41.4	90	93	7	31,829	57
Sandabrånet	2,138	1,732	70.7	27.2	79	88	12	25,377	60
Sandbacka	1,702	1,337	72.0	26.6	82	90	10	28,348	59
Sandåkern	1,384	1,246	59.8	38.9	85	91	9	27,386	53
Sofiehem	1,638	1,207	72.5	26.2	80	84	16	27,818	72
Stöcke	1,480	1,046	54.7	45.1	89	94	6	31,048	50
Stöcksjö-Degernäs	1,507	1,047	54.3	44.8	92	92	8	32,141	50
Sävar V	1,869	1,354	64.0	35.8	87	94	6	28,162	49
Sävar Ö	2,157	1,547	64.5	34.9	90	95	5	29,111	53
Södra Teg	1,057	856	57.4	41.4	81	88	12	24,556	41
Sörmjöle-Norrmjöle	1,445	1,198	59.2	40.4	89	94	6	29,278	49
Tavelsjö	2,426	1,828	55.4	43.6	90	96	4	28,890	41
Tomtebo	1,890	1,270	75.7	23.2	76	76	24	25,194	67
Tomtebo N	2,409	1,714	67.3	31.7	70	78	22	24,043	73
Tomtebo S	1,754	1,237	73.4	25.7	84	83	17	30,102	72
Täfteå	1,754	1,219	62.7	36.2	89	95	5	33,106	60
Umedalen V	2,335	1,598	65.3	33.4	81	84	16	28,092	56
Umedalen Ö	1,712	1,208	68.4	28.6	78	80	20	24,919	46
Universitetsområdet	2,232	1,813	68.4	30.5	39	69	31	6,214	77
Universitetsom. Ö	1,707	1,461	75.0	22.9	58	77	23	14,467	69
Västerslätt	1,918	1,463	66.3	33.3	87	93	7	29,968	57
Västteg	1,669	1,486	60.5	38.8	83	92	8	27,339	51
Ytterhiske	1,247	1,060	66.1	32.4	80	88	12	25,077	52
Yttersjö	1,708	1,207	59.8	39.2	91	95	5	30,333	47
Ålidhem S	1,993	1,378	76.8	20.9	65	60	40	18,647	59
Ålidhem V	1,965	1,199	71.8	25.7	35	50	50	4,821	72
Ålidhem Ö	2,415	1,449	76.7	20.7	45	46	54	6,843	66
Öbacka-Rosendal	1,715	1,402	76.6	22.5	78	87	13	25,795	67
Öbackastrand	1,418	1,180	65.8	33.0	78	83	17	28,161	72
Östermalm-Fridhem	1,342	1,099	69.3	30.0	73	84	16	24,627	69
Östteg	1,966	1,474	60.6	39.0	86	90	10	31,859	64
Source: SVT

== International relations ==
=== Twin towns — Sister cities ===
Umeå Municipality is twinned with:

- Saskatoon, Canada
- Qufu, People's Republic of China
- Helsingør Municipality, Denmark
- Vaasa, Finland
- Würzburg, Germany
- Guanajuato, Mexico
- Harstad, Norway
- Petrozavodsk, Russia
- Osmangazi (Bursa), Turkey
- Nilufer (Bursa), Turkey

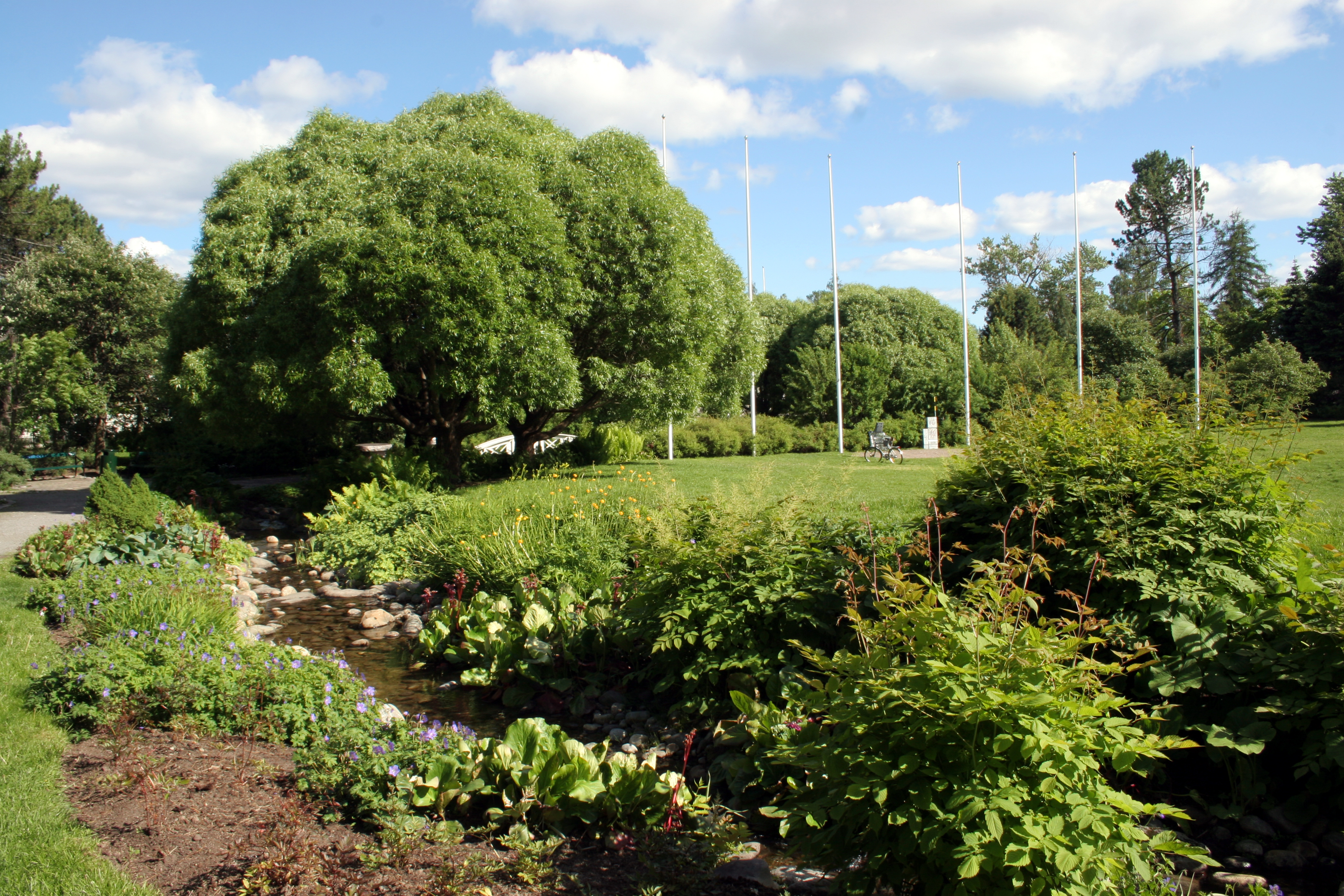
Vänortsparken in Umeå.

In Twin Towns' Park (Vänortsparken) is the artwork Tellus: it is a map of the world, with each sister city's location. Each sister city also has a designated themed area in the park.

== See also ==
- Blue Highway, tourist route (Norway - Sweden - Finland - Russia)
