= Västerbotten =

Historical province of Sweden

Coordinates: 64°15′N 20°15′E

- Historical province
- Västerbotten
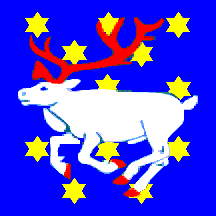
- Flag Coat of arms

- Country: Sweden
- Land: Norrland
- County: Västerbotten

Area
  - Total: 15,093 km^{2} (5,827 sq mi)

Population (31 December 2023)
  - Total: 234,817
  - Density: 15.558/km^{2} (40.295/sq mi)

Culture
  - Flower: Moor-king lousewort
  - Animal: Curlew
  - Bird: Hen harrier
  - Fish: Lamprey
- Time zone: UTC+1 (CET)
  - Summer (DST): UTC+2 (CEST)

Västerbotten (Swedish: [ˈvɛ̂sːtɛrˌbɔtːɛn]), sometimes called West Bothnia or Westrobothnia, is a province (landskap) in northern Sweden, located by the Gulf of Bothnia. It borders the provinces of Ångermanland, Lapland and Norrbotten. The region is famous for Västerbotten cheese.

== Administration ==
The traditional provinces of Sweden have no administrative or political functions; instead, they are purely historical and cultural entities. The administrative units are the counties. Västerbotten County encompasses the province of Västerbotten as well as the southern part of Swedish Lapland.

== Heraldry ==
On 18 January 1884, all Swedish provinces were granted the status of duchies, allowing their coats of arms to be displayed with a ducal coronet. The coat of arms for Västerbotten is described as: "Azure Seme of Mullets Or a Reindeer in full course and hoofed Gules."

== Geography ==
Västerbotten was historically divided into chartered cities and districts.

=== Cities ===
- Umeå (1622)
- Skellefteå (1845)

=== Municipalities in Västerbotten County ===
- Bjurholm, Ångermanland
- Dorotea, Lapland
- Lycksele, Lapland
- Malå, Lapland
- Nordmaling, Ångermanland
- Norsjö, Västerbotten
- Robertsfors, Västerbotten
- Skellefteå, Västerbotten
- Sorsele, Lapland
- Storuman, Lapland
- Umeå, Västerbotten
- Vilhelmina, Lapland
- Vindeln, Västerbotten
- Vännäs, Västerbotten
- Åsele, Lapland

=== Towns and villages ===
- Björksele

=== Facts ===
- Highest mountain: Åmliden (550 meters)
- Largest lake: Bygdeträsket

== History ==
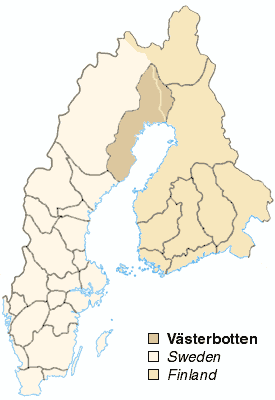
Västerbotten's old borders included Norrbotten and extended into present-day Finland.

Until the Finnish War of 1808–1809 and the Treaty of Fredrikshamn, the province of Västerbotten included a small portion of what is now northern Finland. This area was later incorporated into Finnish Lapland. The province of Ostrobothnia (Finnish: Pohjanmaa, Swedish: Österbotten), was located on the Finnish side of the Gulf of Bothnia, and its name is still in use today.

Following the treaty of Fredrikshamn, which redefined the outlines and orientation of Sweden, Västerbotten County was split in 1810. The northern part became Norrbotten County. The Swedish-speaking residents of Norrbotten, a multilingual region, began identifying as norrbottningar, with the new county borders fostering a local identity. Today, Norrbotten is considered a separate province, even though provinces had lost their administrative and legal significance hundreds of years before 1810.

Västerbotten Regiment served as the provincial regiment.

== Dukes of Västerbotten ==
Since the 13th century, Swedish princes from certain dynasties have been created dukes of various provinces. Since 1772, these titles have been purely nominal.

- Prince Gustaf Adolf (1906–1947)
  - Princess Sibylla (1932–1972)
- Princess Ines (2025–)

== Geography ==
=== Lakes and watercourses ===
Lakes

- Bodträsket
- Burträsket
- Bygdeträsket
- Norsjön
- Nydalasjön
- Storvindeln
- Storsävarträsket
- Stöcksjön
- Tavelsjön
- Storkågeträsket

Watercourses

- Åbyälven
- Tåmeälven
- Byskeälven
- Kågeälven
- Skellefteälven
- Bureälven
- Malån
- Mångbyån
- Rickleån

Watercourses

- Dalkarlsån
- Sävarån
- Täfteån
- Tavelån
- Umeälven
- Vindelälven
- Norrmjöleån
- Åhedån
- Sörmjöleån

== Sports ==
Regional football in the province is administered by Västerbottens Fotbollförbund. Ice hockey is also popular, with IF Björklöven and Skellefteå AIK.
