= Västerslätt =

- Residential area
- Interactive map of Västerslätt
- Coordinates: 63°50′19″N 20°13′41″E
- Country: Sweden
- Province: Västerbotten
- County: Västerbotten County
- Municipality: Umeå Municipality
- Time zone: UTC+1 (CET)
  - Summer (DST): UTC+2 (CEST)

Västerslätt is a residential area in Umeå, Sweden. The residential area, which began construction in 1955 consists of a residential area, which is bounded to the southwest by the district of Rödäng by Tvärån, and a small number of apartment buildings just north of Vännäsvägen (county road 507, formerly E12).

North of Västerlätt's industrial area, which stretches for several kilometres along county road 363 (Hissjövägen), is Umeå freight yard, which in 2010 was relocated from the central station in central Umeå.

In the centre of Västerslätt, there is a grocery store, a café, a bank branch, a hairdressing salon and Västerslättskyrkan S:t Staffan.

== Transportation ==
The residential area’s district center is served by public transport via local (Ultra) bus lines 7 and 81, which operate between Rödäng and Vasaplan in central Umeå, continuing toward Berghem and Mariehem.

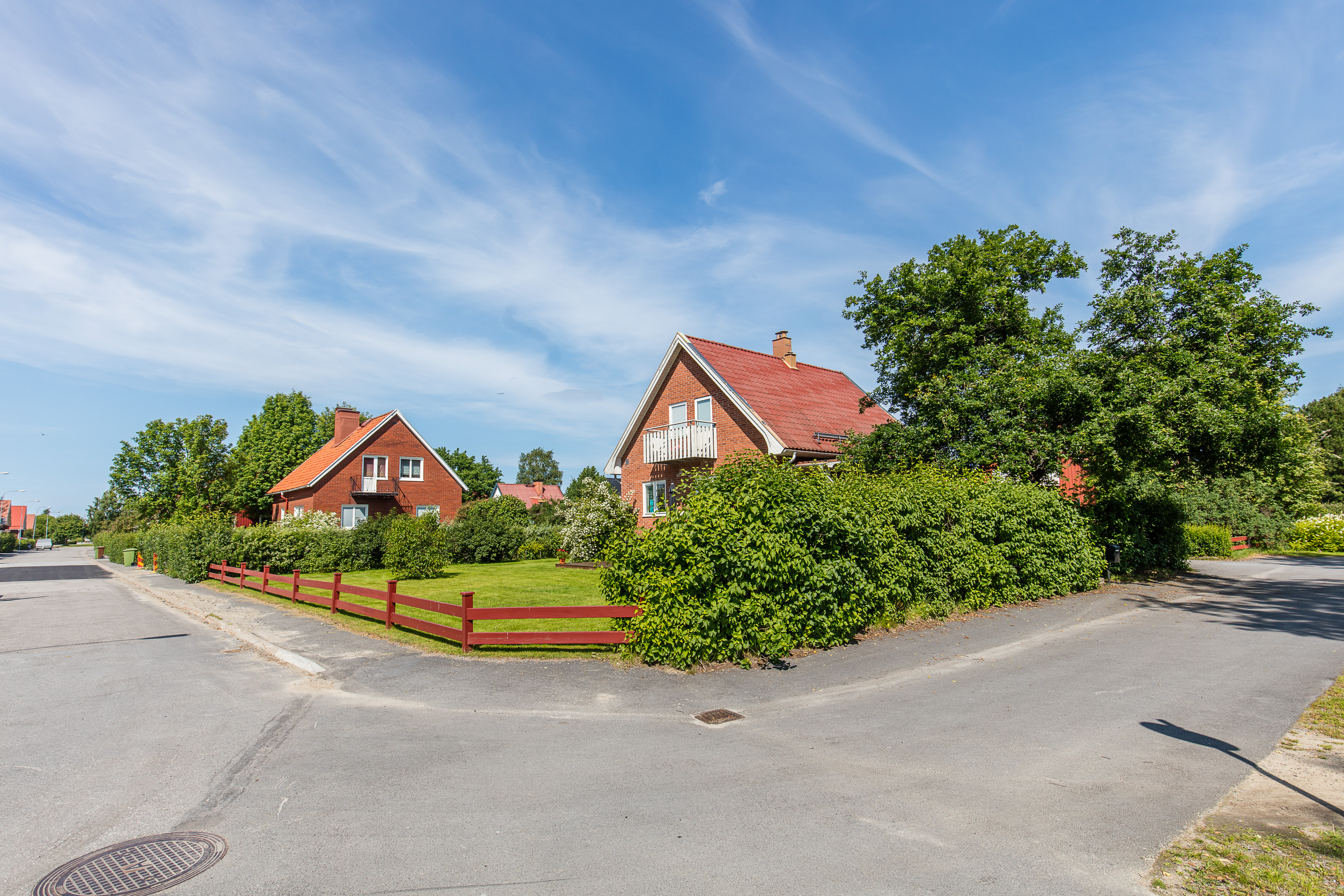
Detached houses in Västerslätt.

Before 2010, the Vännäs–Umeå–Holmsund railway line ran through the area as street-running track located between Spårvägen and Industrivägen. The main line diverged from the Västerslätt industrial track at Bomvägen and was never reconnected to it, although this may appear to be the case, as the dead-end track at Fläktvägen/Spårvägen lies very close to the former Grisbacka passing loop.

In April 2020, dismantling of the industrial area's rail infrastructure began. Since then, all freight transport has taken place via transshipment at Umeå freight yard. The track serving the newspaper printing facility Daily Print was also removed.
