= Wallmark =

Wallmark is a Swedish surname. Notable people with the surname include:

- Gösta Wallmark (1928–2017), Swedish artist
- Hans Wallmark (born 1965), Swedish politician
- J. Torkel Wallmark (1919–2007), Swedish electrical engineer
- Kjell Junior Wallmark (born 1981), better known as Brolle, Swedish singer and musician
- Lucas Wallmark (born 1995), Swedish ice hockey player
- Marcus Wallmark (born 1991), Swedish ice hockey player
- Otto Wallmark (1830–1901), American businessman politician
