= Carlshöjd =

- Residential area
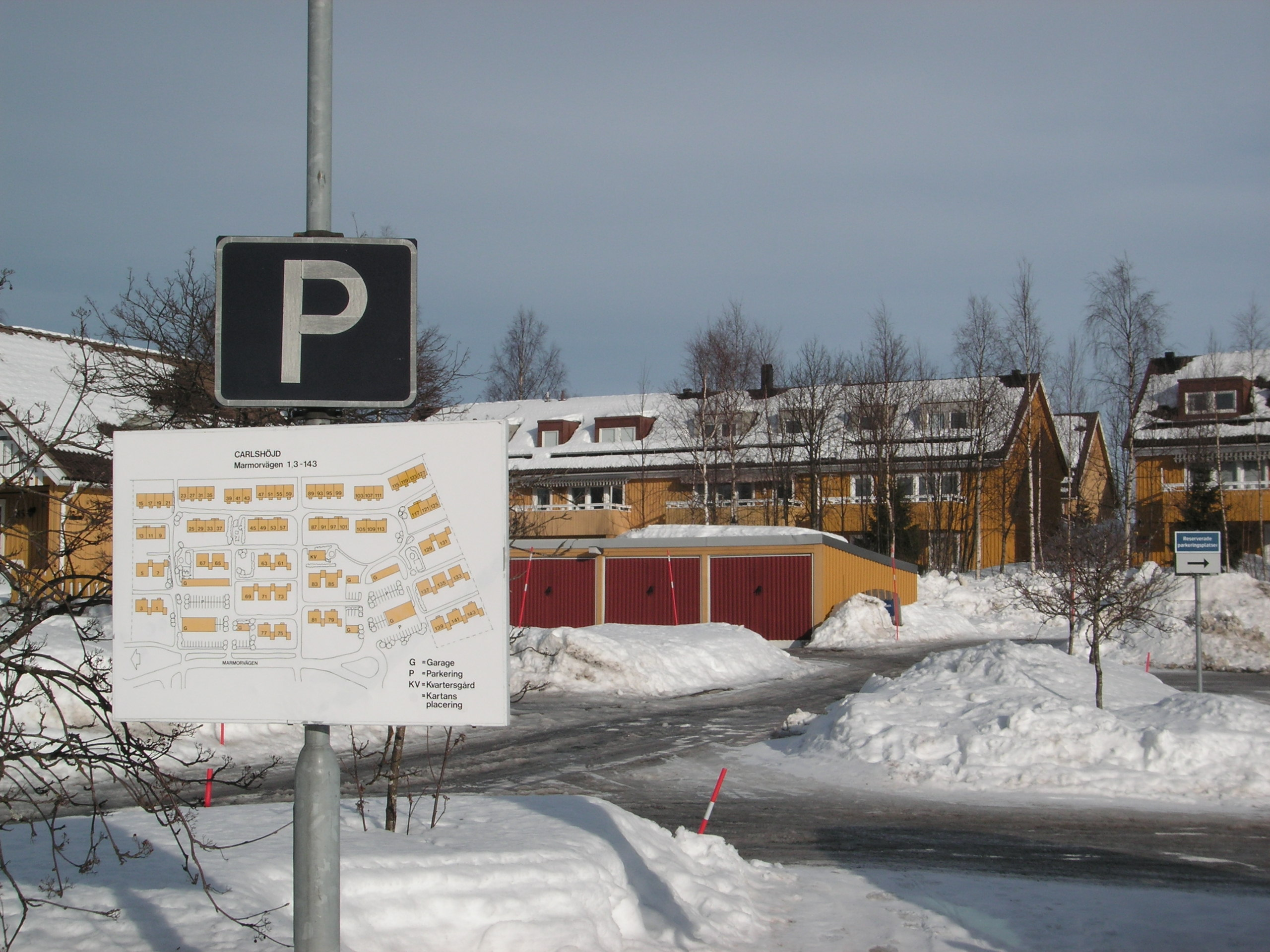

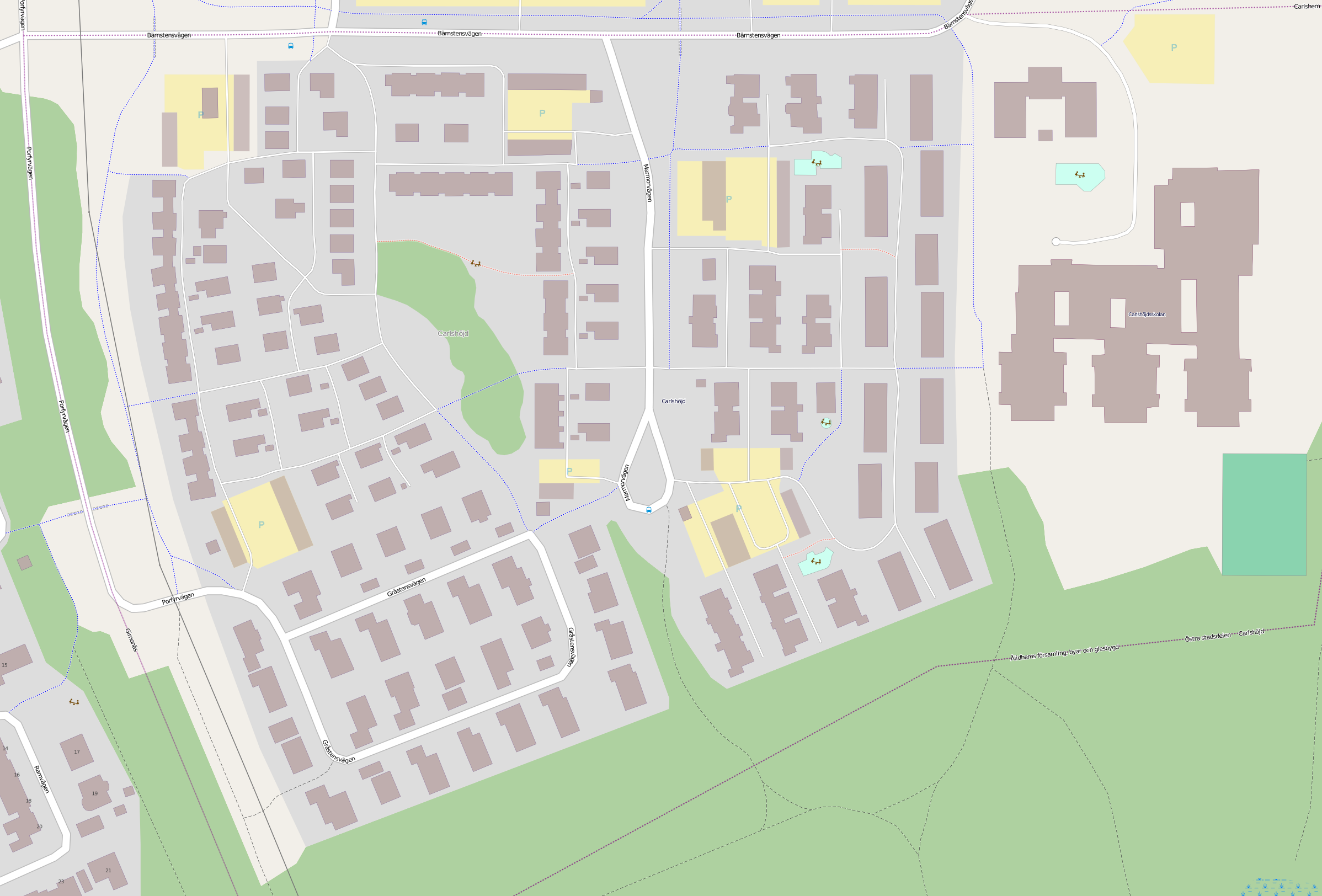
- Map of Carlshöjd, from OpenStreetMap
- Coordinates: 63°47′48″N 20°19′09″E
- Country: Sweden
- Province: Västerbotten
- County: Västerbotten County
- Municipality: Umeå Municipality
- Time zone: UTC+1 (CET)
  - Summer (DST): UTC+2 (CEST)

Carlshöjd is a residential area in Umeå, Sweden.

== History ==
The names Carlshöjd, Carlslid and Carlshem originate from the inn Carlslund, which at the end of the 18th century was located where Älvans väg in Tomtebo exists today.
