= Carlslid =

- Residential area
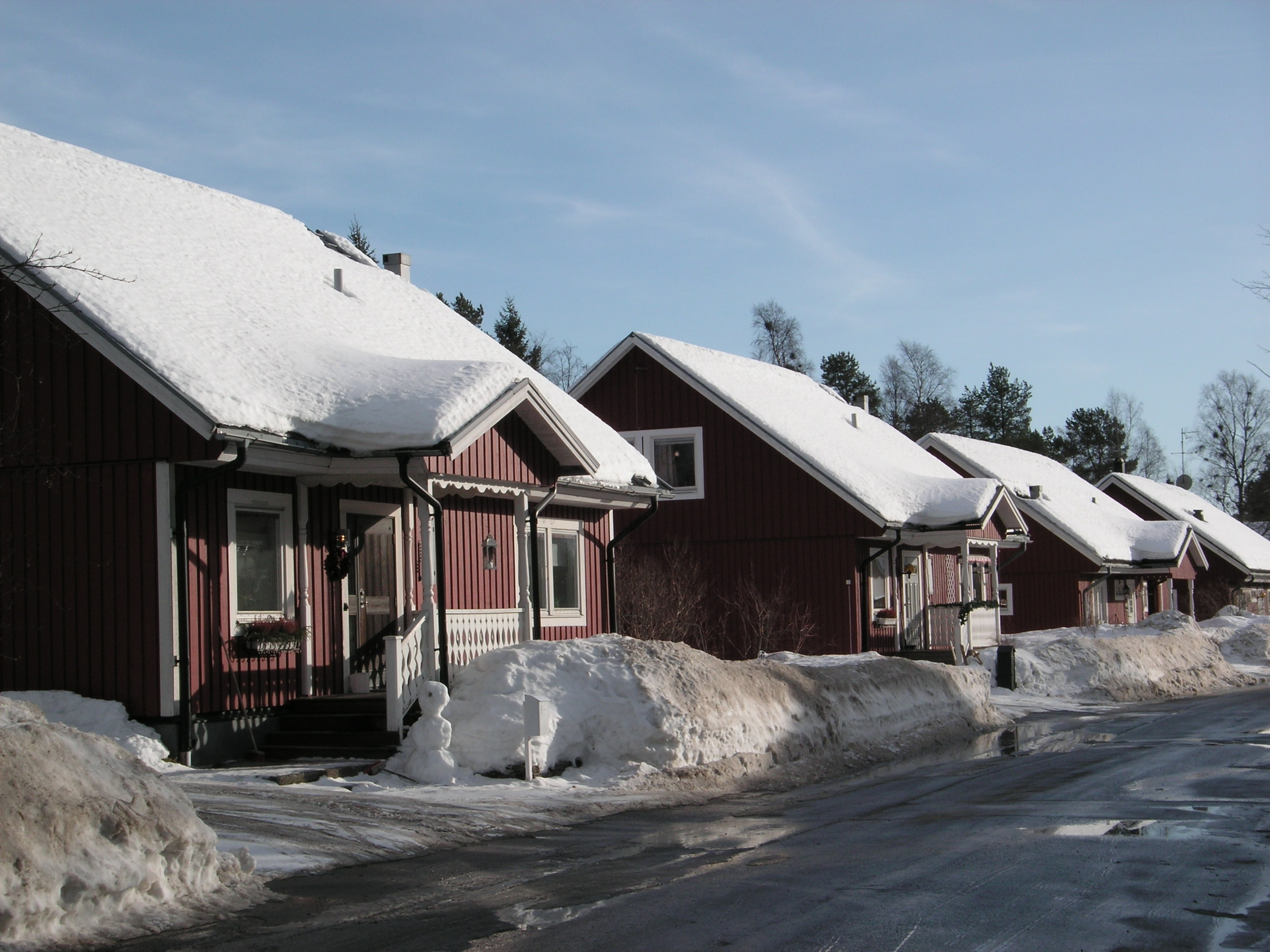

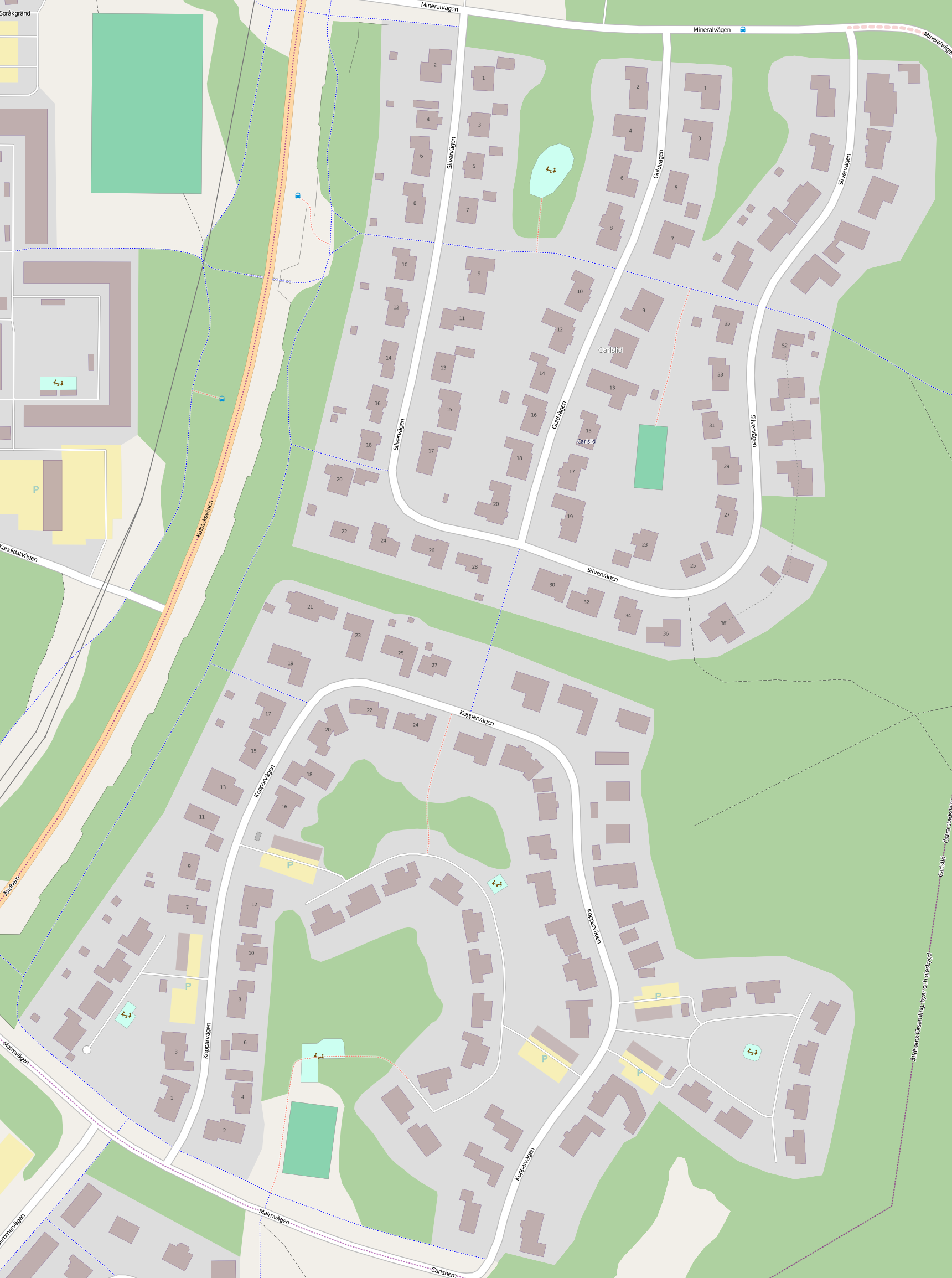
- Map of Carlslid, from OpenStreetMap
- Coordinates: 63°48′31″N 20°19′44″E
- Country: Sweden
- Province: Västerbotten
- County: Västerbotten County
- Municipality: Umeå Municipality
- Time zone: UTC+1 (CET)
  - Summer (DST): UTC+2 (CEST)

Carlslid is a residential area in Umeå, Sweden.

== History ==
The names Carlslid, Carlshem and Carlshöjd originate from the inn Carlslund, which at the end of the 18th century was located where Älvans väg in Tomtebo exists in the present day.
