= Backen Church =

- Backens kyrka
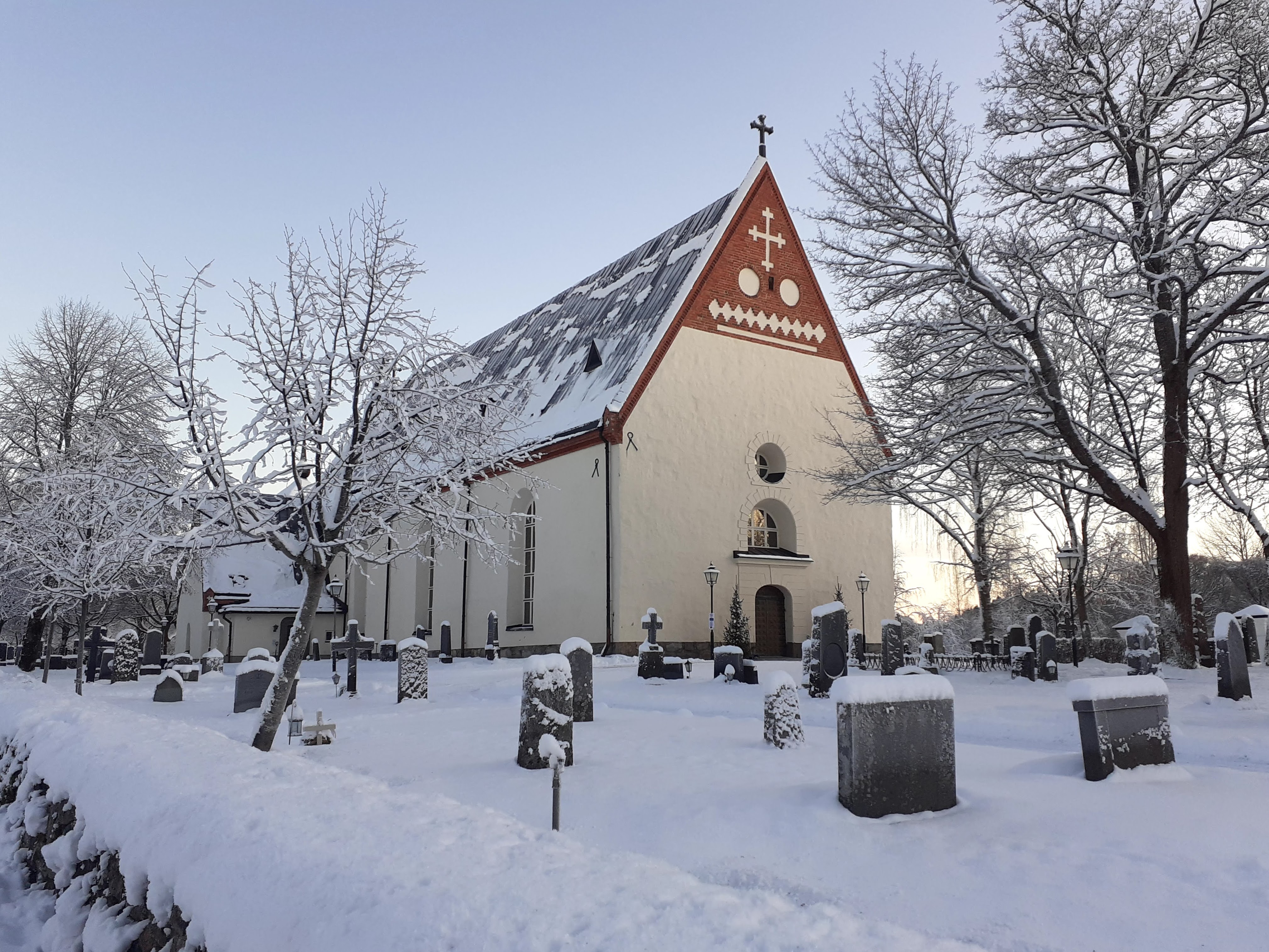
- Backen Church
- Backen Church
- 63°49′51″N 20°10′11″E
- Location: Umeå
- Country: Sweden
- Denomination: Church of Sweden

Administration
- Diocese: Luleå

Backen Church (Swedish: Backens kyrka) is a church in Backen, Umeå, Sweden

== History ==
The founding of the church must have occurred before 1314 because it is then mentioned in documents. It may not have been this church as an alternative foundation was found under the church in the 1950s. This church was built in the 16th century when Jacob Ulfsson was archbishop. This church would have been one of the biggest on the coast. There was a fire in 1893 and another in 1986 when only the arches and the walls remained standing. The architect Jerk Alton and the artist Per Andersson supervised its reconstruction.
