= Lilljansberget =

Area of Umeå, Sweden

Coordinates: 63°49′35″N 20°18′46″E

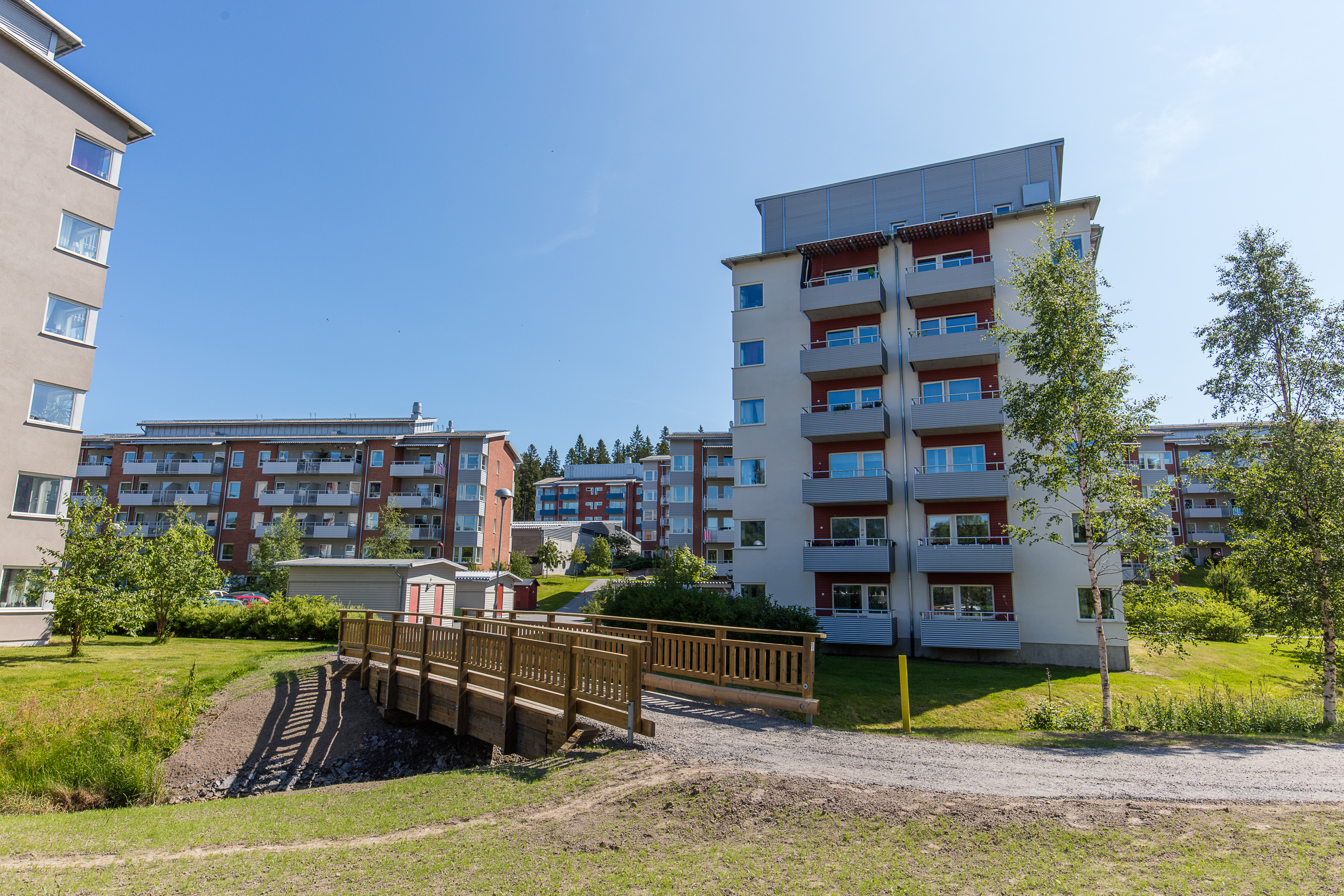
Lilljansberget in July 2015

Lilljansberget is a mountain, and since 2005 a residential area, in Umeå, Sweden. It is located next to the Umeå University. All the apartments are owned by AB Bostaden.
