= Carlshem =

- Residential area
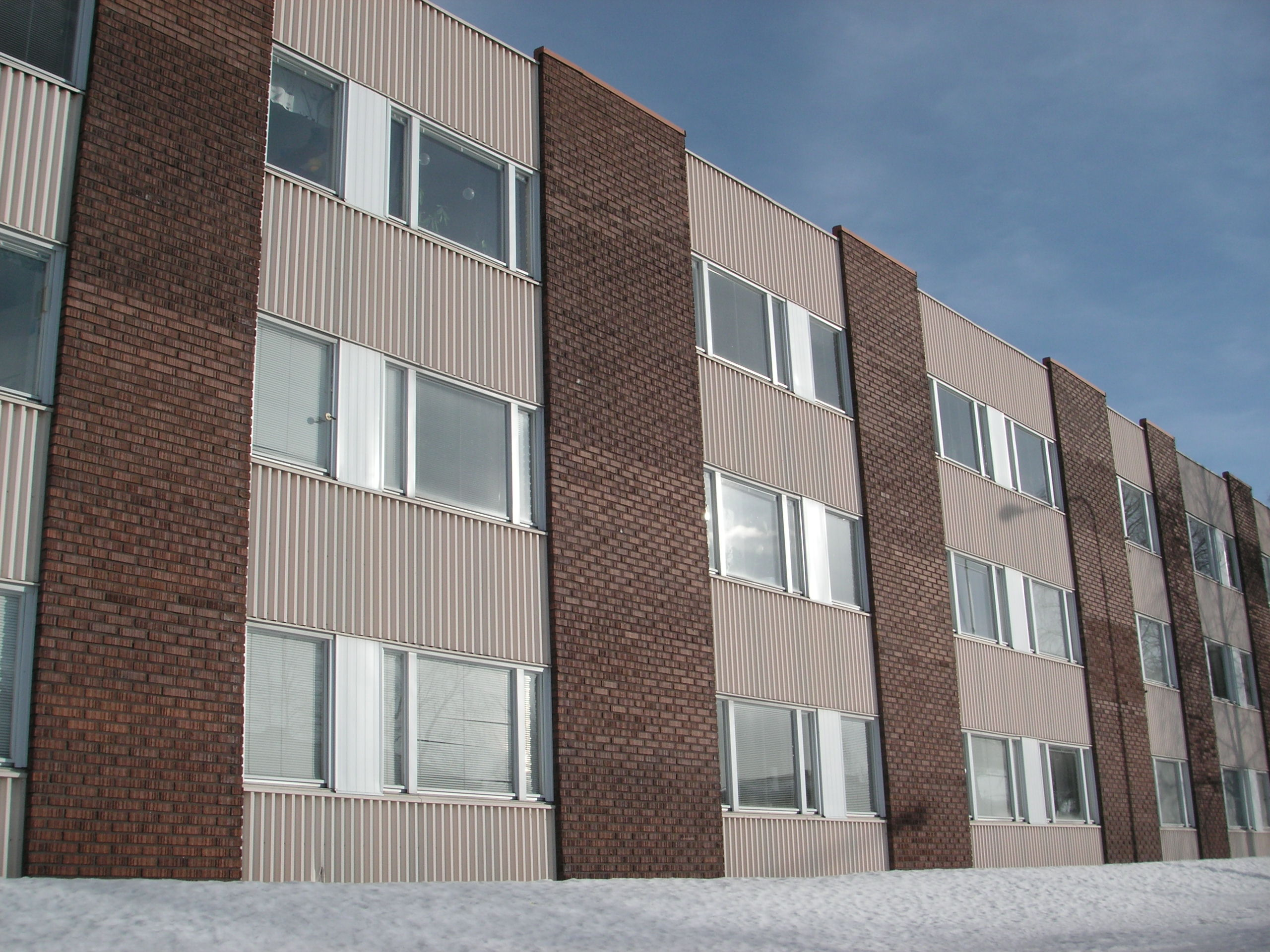
- Apartment building typical for the area.

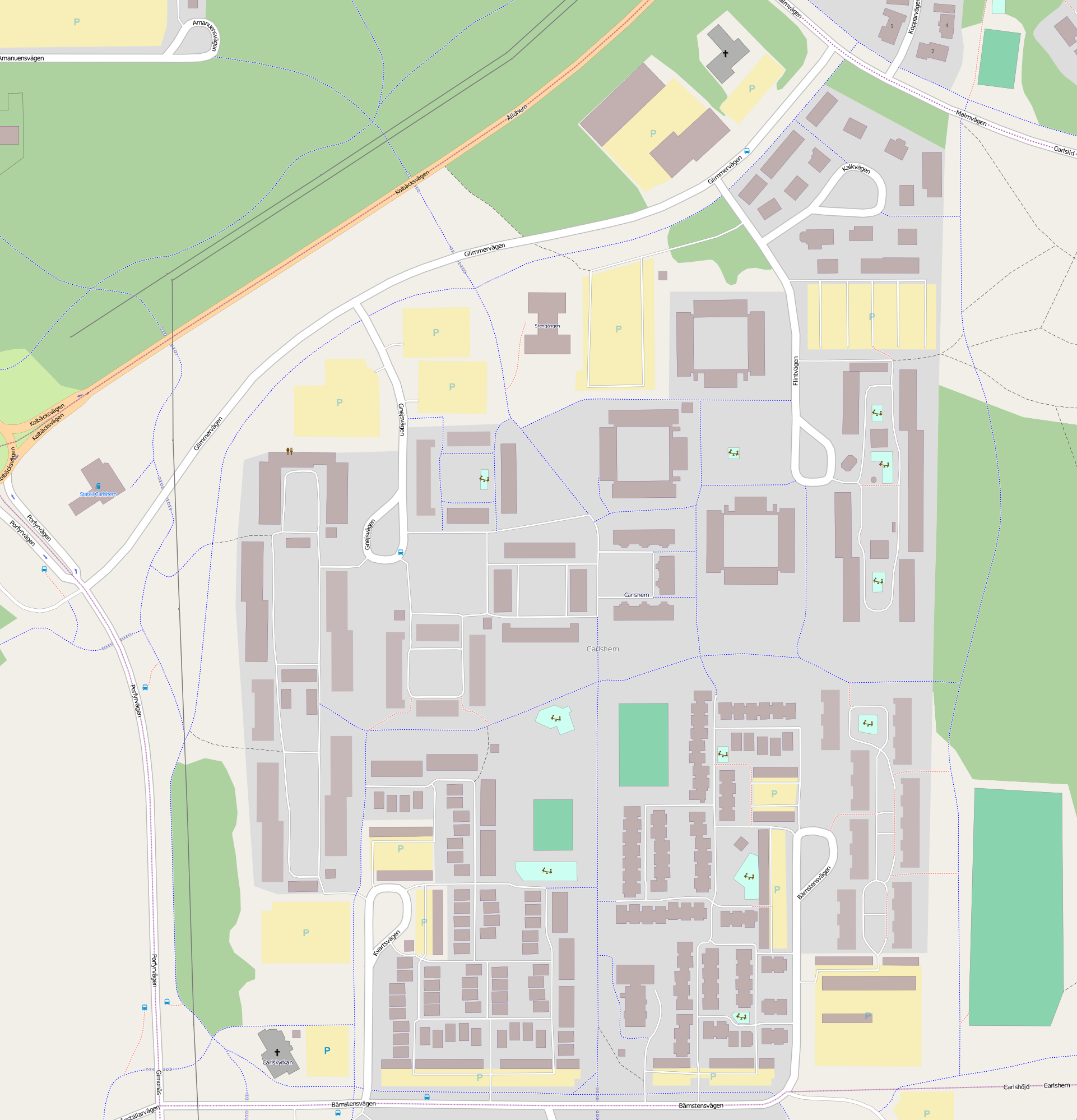
- Map of Carlshem, from OpenStreetMap
- Coordinates: 63°48′06″N 20°19′09″E
- Country: Sweden
- Province: Västerbotten
- County: Västerbotten County
- Municipality: Umeå Municipality
- Time zone: UTC+1 (CET)
  - Summer (DST): UTC+2 (CEST)

Carlshem is a residential area in southeastern Umeå, Sweden, located about 5 kilometers from central Umeå. Most of the area were built in the 1970s.

The area consists of both townhouses, villas and apartment buildings with two or three storeys. There are both regular rental apartments and student flats. The area also includes a hair salon and a restaurant.

There is a church in the area, Carlskyrkan, which opened in 1984. A hotel and spa is planned to be built in the area.

== History ==
The names Carlshem, Carlslid, and Carlshöjd originate from the inn Carlslund, which at the end of the 18th century was located where Älvans väg in Tomtebo exists today.

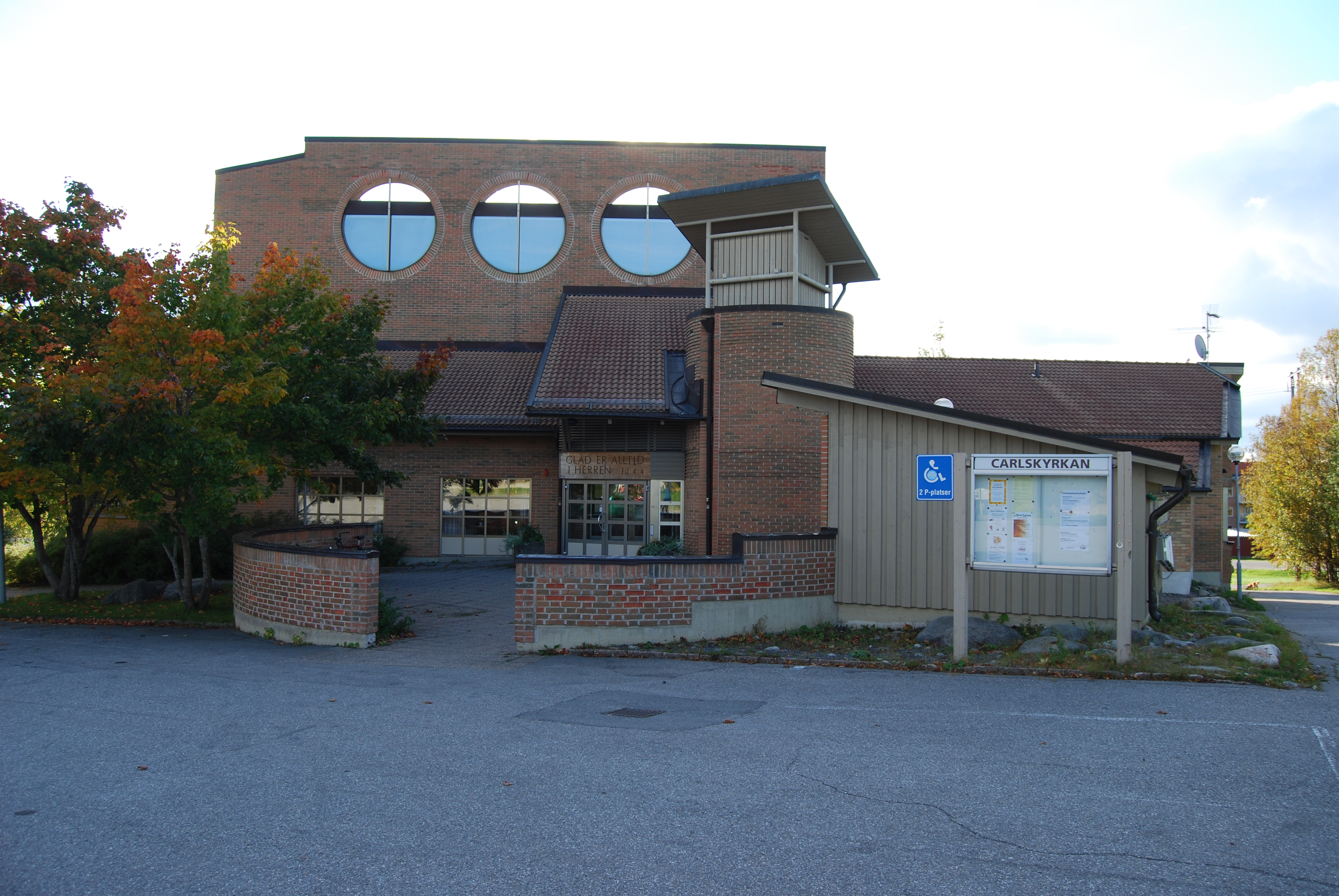
Carlskyrkan

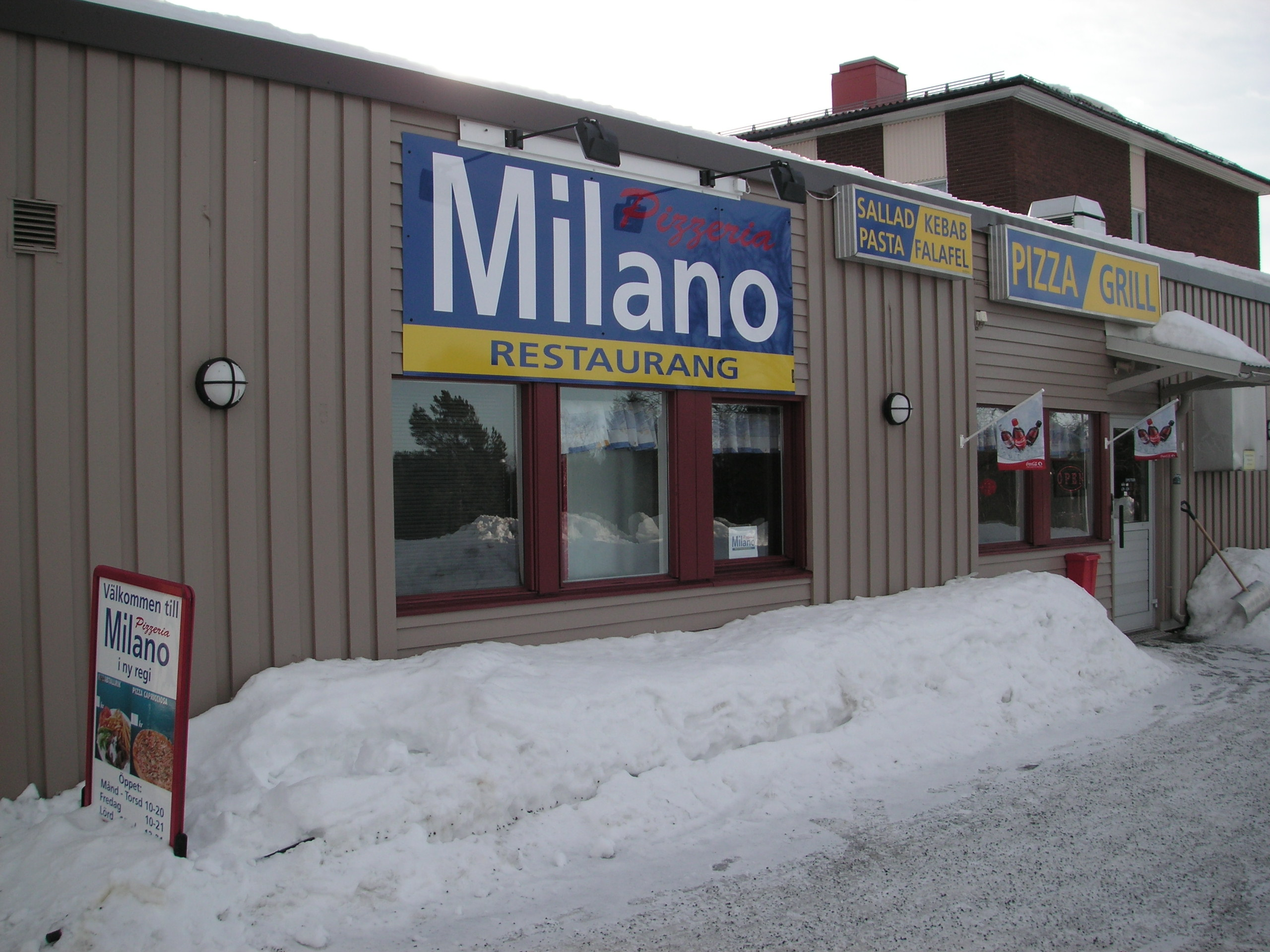
Milano, a restaurant at Carlshem.
