= Minerva Gymnasium =

Coordinates: 63.8267°N 20.2778°E

- Umeå, 907 36; Sweden

Information
- School type: Private secondary school
- Established: 2002
- Grades: 10–12 (1–3)

Minerva Gymnasium (or Minervagymnasium) is an independent upper secondary school in Umeå, Sweden. It was established in 2002 and is located in the vicinity of the University area, IKSU Sport as well as the Uminova Science Park. The facilities used by the school was formerly office spaces for Ericsson, and is currently shared by IT consulting firm Tieto. Admission requirements for Minerva Gymnasium involves adequate final grades (E) in Swedish, Mathematics, English as well as 9 other subjects. The school is also approved for nationwide admission of students.

Minerva Gymnasium offers three College preparatory programmes, The Natural Science programme, The Social Science programme, and The Business Management and Economics programme. The school is wholly owned and operated by Minervaskolan AB, a private limited company that also operates a compulsory school (Grades 7–9) nearby; named Minervaskolan.

In spring 2015, construction of a new schoolhouse commenced due to limited space in the current facilities and an ever-increasing number of students. The building is expected to be completed a year after and will accommodate roughly 800 students.
