= Sofiehem =

- Residential area
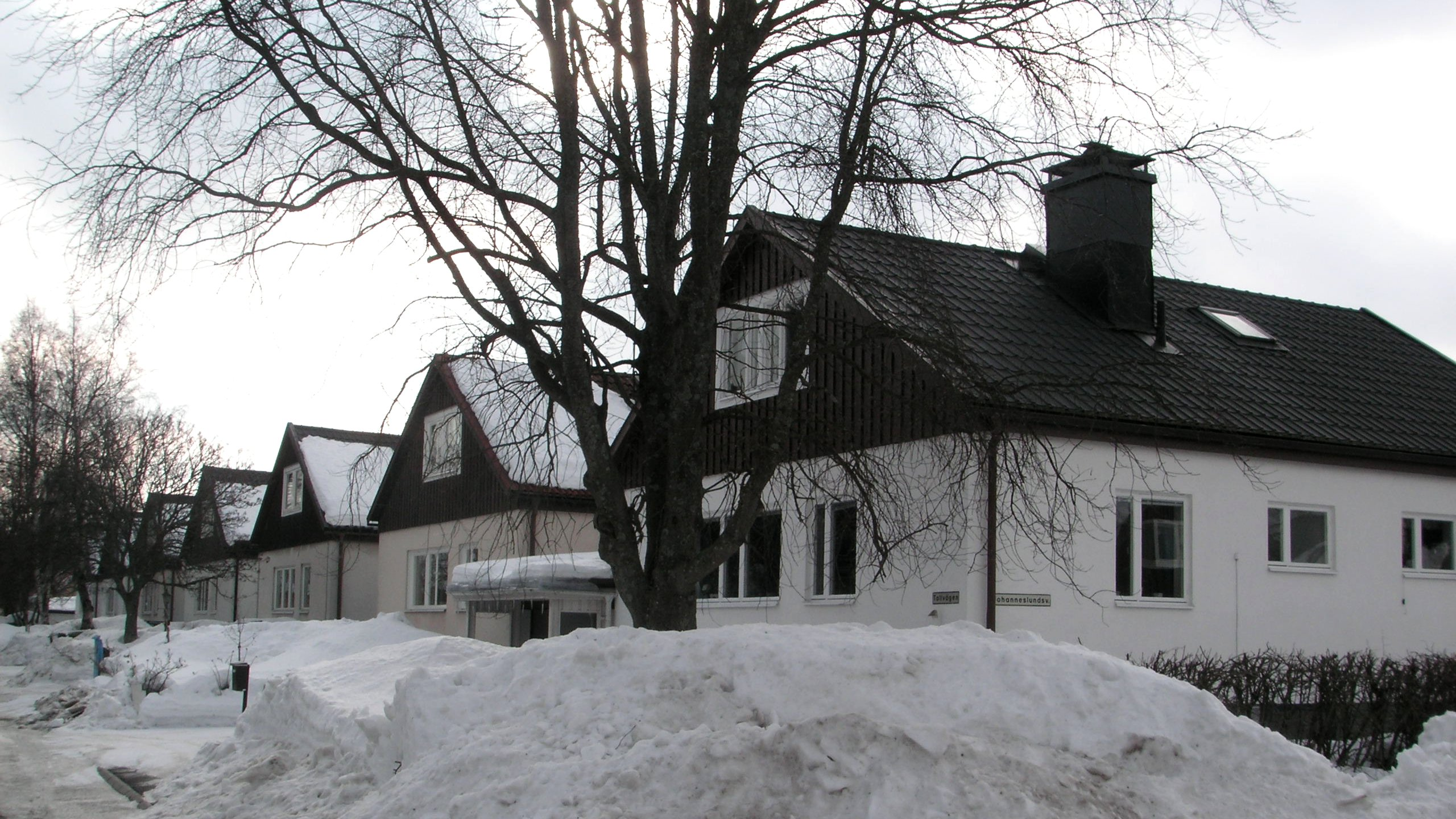

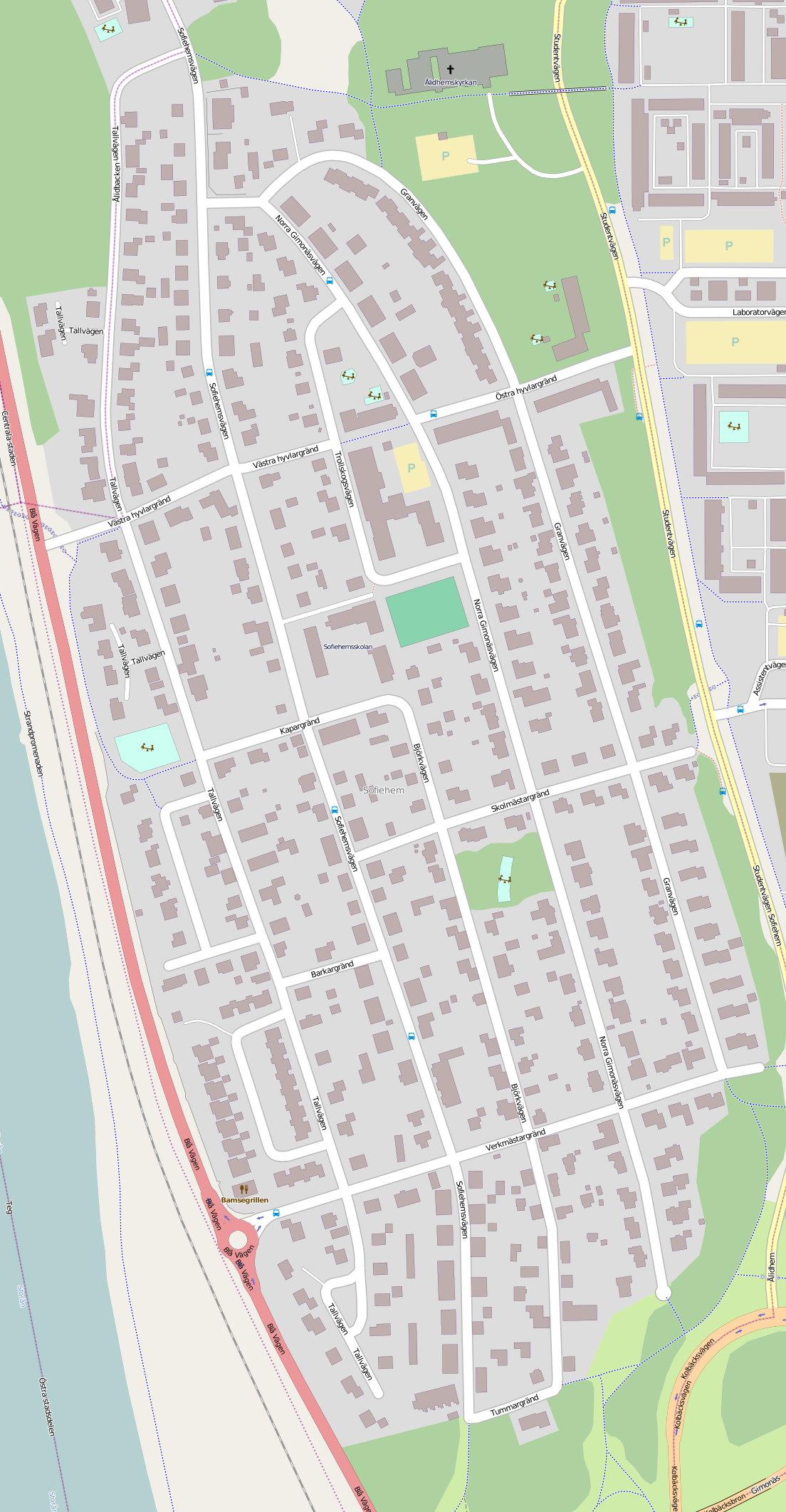
- Map of Sofiehem, from OpenStreetMap
- Coordinates: 63°48′30″N 20°18′07″E
- Country: Sweden
- Province: Västerbotten
- County: Västerbotten County
- Municipality: Umeå Municipality
- Time zone: UTC+1 (CET)
  - Summer (DST): UTC+2 (CEST)

Sofiehem is a residential area in Umeå, Sweden. Located close to Umeå University and Norrlands Universtitetssjukhus, it has historically been a preferred area for academics and medical doctors to settle with their families.
