= Marieberg, Umeå =

Marieberg
- Residential area
- Interactive map of Marieberg
- Coordinates: 63°50′43″N 20°19′33″E
- Country: Sweden
- Province: Västerbotten
- County: Västerbotten County
- Municipality: Umeå Municipality
- Time zone: UTC+1 (CET)
  - Summer (DST): UTC+2 (CEST)

Marieberg is a residential area in Umeå, Sweden.
