= Backen =

- Residential area
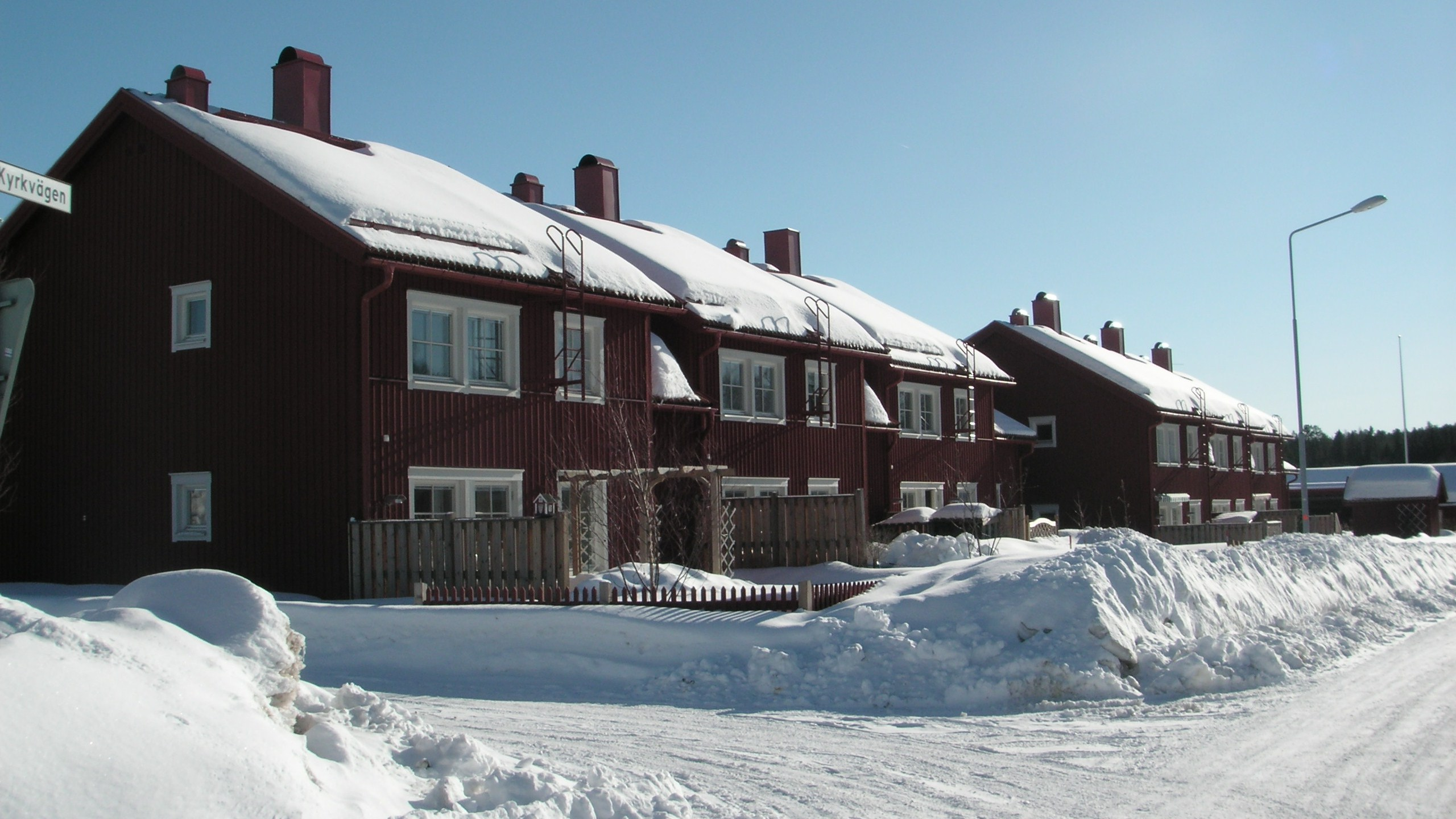
- Interactive map of Backen
- Coordinates: 63°49′53″N 20°09′45″E
- Country: Sweden
- Province: Västerbotten
- County: Västerbotten County
- Municipality: Umeå Municipality
- Time zone: UTC+1 (CET)
  - Summer (DST): UTC+2 (CEST)

Backen is a residential area in Umeå, Sweden. It is home to Backen Church which dates from before 1314.
