= Ålidbacken =

- Residential area
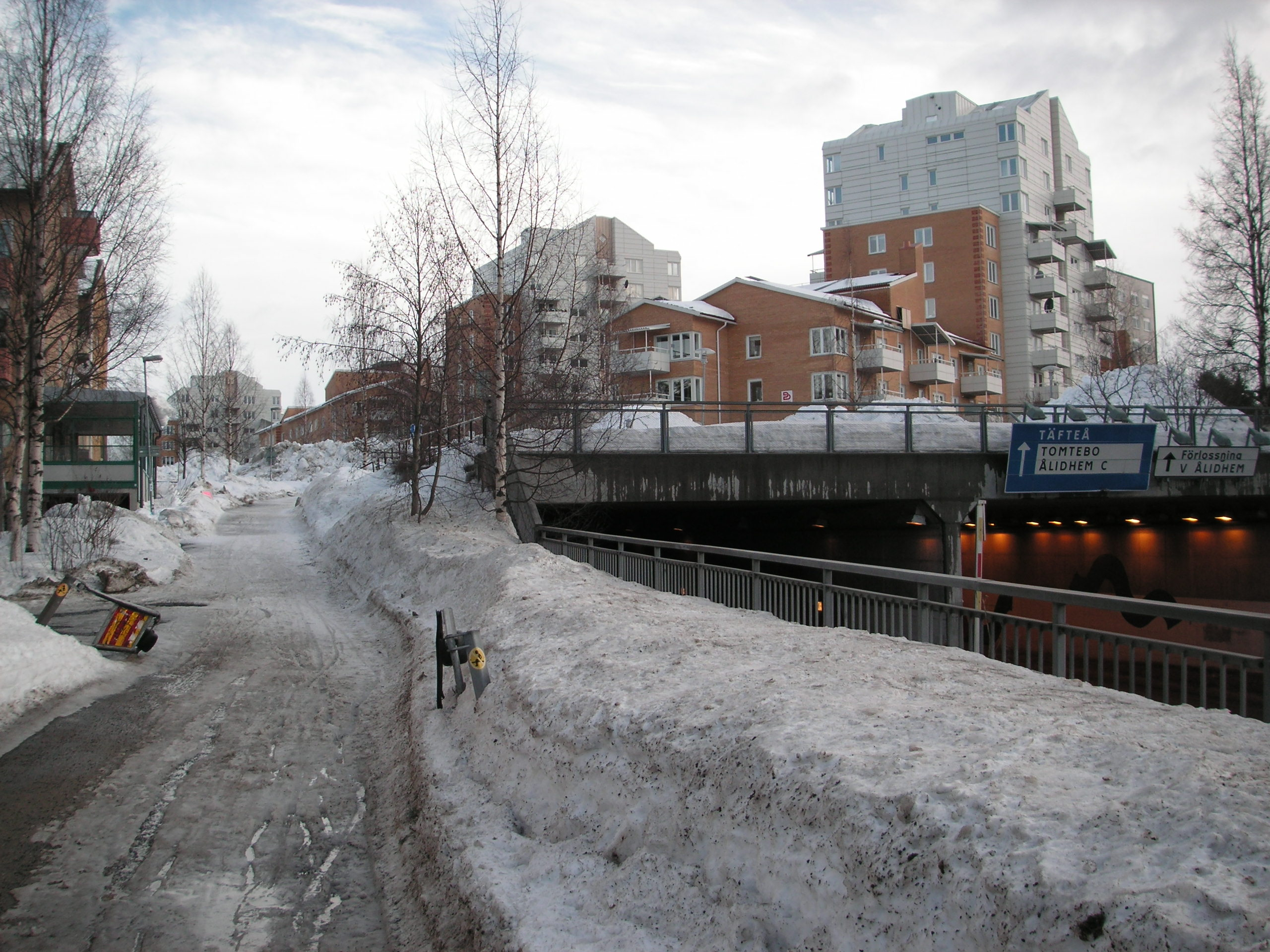
- Interactive map of Ålidbacken
- Coordinates: 63°48′49″N 20°17′59″E
- Country: Sweden
- Province: Västerbotten
- County: Västerbotten County
- Municipality: Umeå Municipality
- Time zone: UTC+1 (CET)
  - Summer (DST): UTC+2 (CEST)

Tunnelbacken previously named Ålidbacken is a residential area in Umeå, Sweden. Tunnelbacken is located about 4 km from Umeå centrum. Umeå University and the University Hospital of Umeå are both located less than 1 km from the area. There are a total of 831 apartments in the area, 180 single rooms and another 70 apartments are for students.

== History ==
The first inhabitants of Ålidbacken were three soldiers. They each lived in their own soldier cottage, built in 1695. The king Karl XI had imposed "Öns by" to hold the crown with the three soldiers. This sectioning of land rote number 25 was called "Harneks". The soldiers started to farm the land; they acquired sheep's and goats. These fields were called "soldier field". Such a field was located near the current backup heating plant in Ålidhem.

The city of Umeå was ravaged by a large-scale city fire, called Umeå city fire, which laid most of the city in ashes. To rebuild the city, several industries were built by the river side below Ålidbacken. During the years to come a brickwork factory, a turpentine and tar factory, and two steam sawmills, "Öbackasågen" and "Umeå ångsåg", were built. In 1903 the construction of Umeå hospital began. These establishments attracted factory workers, craftsmen and trades of all kind to settle down on Ålidbacken. A variegated society with working shanties, cafes, shoemakers, shops and road carriers emerged.

When I-20 was built and general conscription was instituted in 1901 the sectioning of land was phased out. "Öns by" started to split up and sell their collective land to, among other workers at "Öbackasågen". In the olden days and during the soldier time, the land at Ålidbacken was owned by "Öns by" and used it as a mountain grazing. Cows were transported from the island during the summer to graze. The women on the island rowed over every morning and night to milk the cows.

In the 1950s the "total sanitation" of the area was initiated and the shanty town started to disappear. The area was built between the late 1960s till the middle of 1970.

The recent largest changes took place in the beginning of the 90s, when Ålidhemstunneln was built in 92, and the area got its new name: Tunnelbacken.

== Detail plans ==
=== Detail plan of 1950 ===
In 1948 the municipality adopted the new city plan for Ålidbacken on 19 November; the proposal was due to the first of January in 1955.

=== Detail plan of 1991 ===
The 22 second of April 1991 the city council accepted the new detail plan for Ålidbacken. The plan itself was written in the seventh of April 1989. It was revised in 1990 and 1991. The purpose of the new plan was to enhance the traffic situation on Ålidbacken and to improve the environment for the inhabitants of the area by covering the highways. Furthermore, the covering would create a larger area for residential buildings.

Changes after revision of the 1991 plan:

The convenience store was moved from the ground floor of the new buildings to its own building in the east; this area was supposed to be a parking garage. The building that had the highest total height was 11 floors. After remarks from the Civil Aviation Authority, it was reduced to nine floors with a height limit of + 51,5 meters.

== Companies/Shops in the area ==
Alibaba Pizzeria

The only restaurant in area is Alibaba Pizzeria which is located at the west end of the area, at the end of the topside of the tunnel.

Salong cut

Located across from Alibaba pizzeria is the small hairdresser: Salong Cut, previously named Salong Madelein.
