= Sandahöjd =

- Residential area
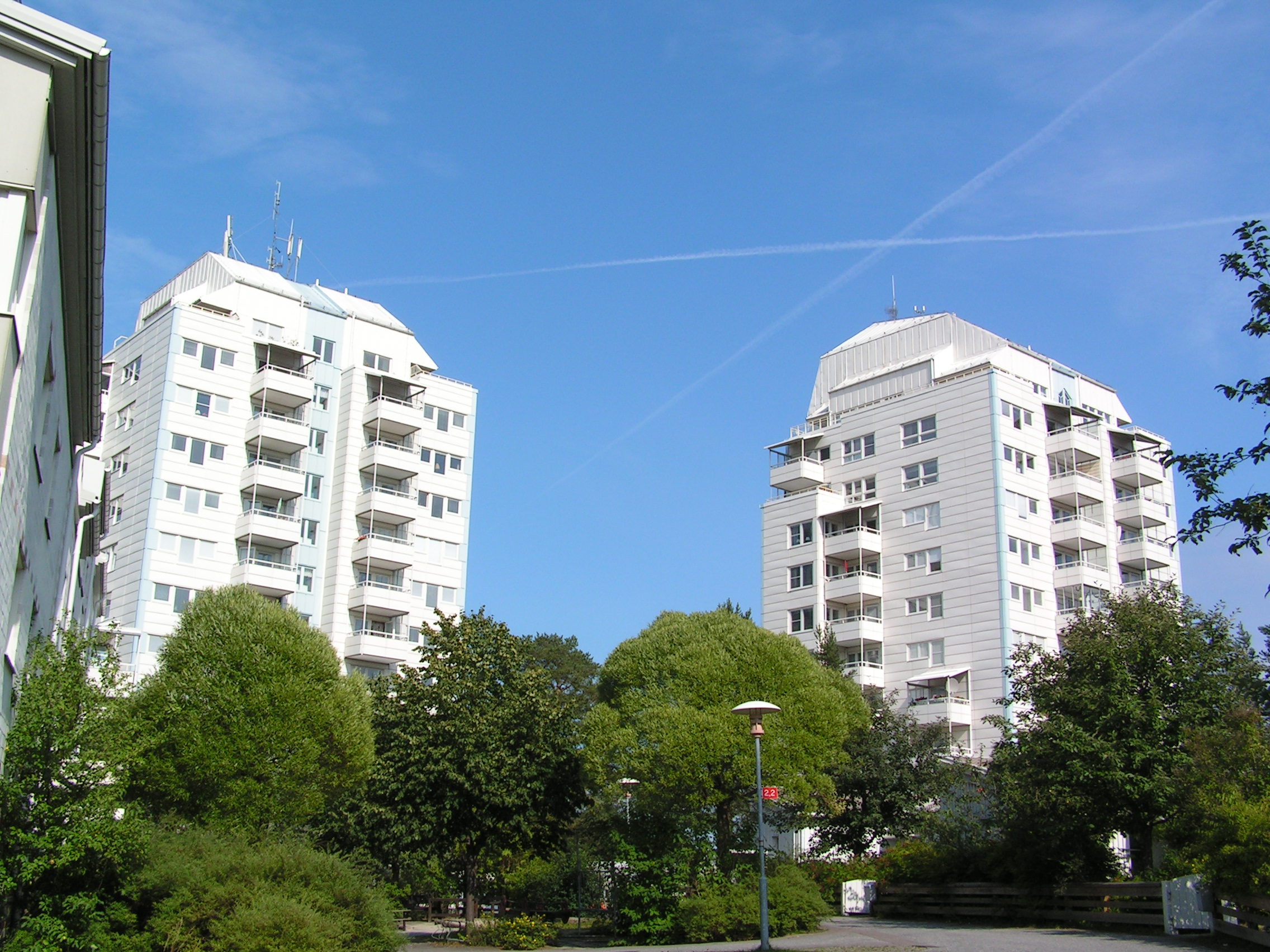
- Interactive map of Sandahöjd
- Coordinates: 63°50′45″N 20°17′45″E
- Country: Sweden
- Province: Västerbotten
- County: Västerbotten County
- Municipality: Umeå Municipality
- Time zone: UTC+1 (CET)
  - Summer (DST): UTC+2 (CEST)

Sandahöjd is a residential area in Umeå, Sweden.
