= AB Bostaden =

Swedish public housing company

Coordinates: 63°49′26.22″N 20°16′12.61″E

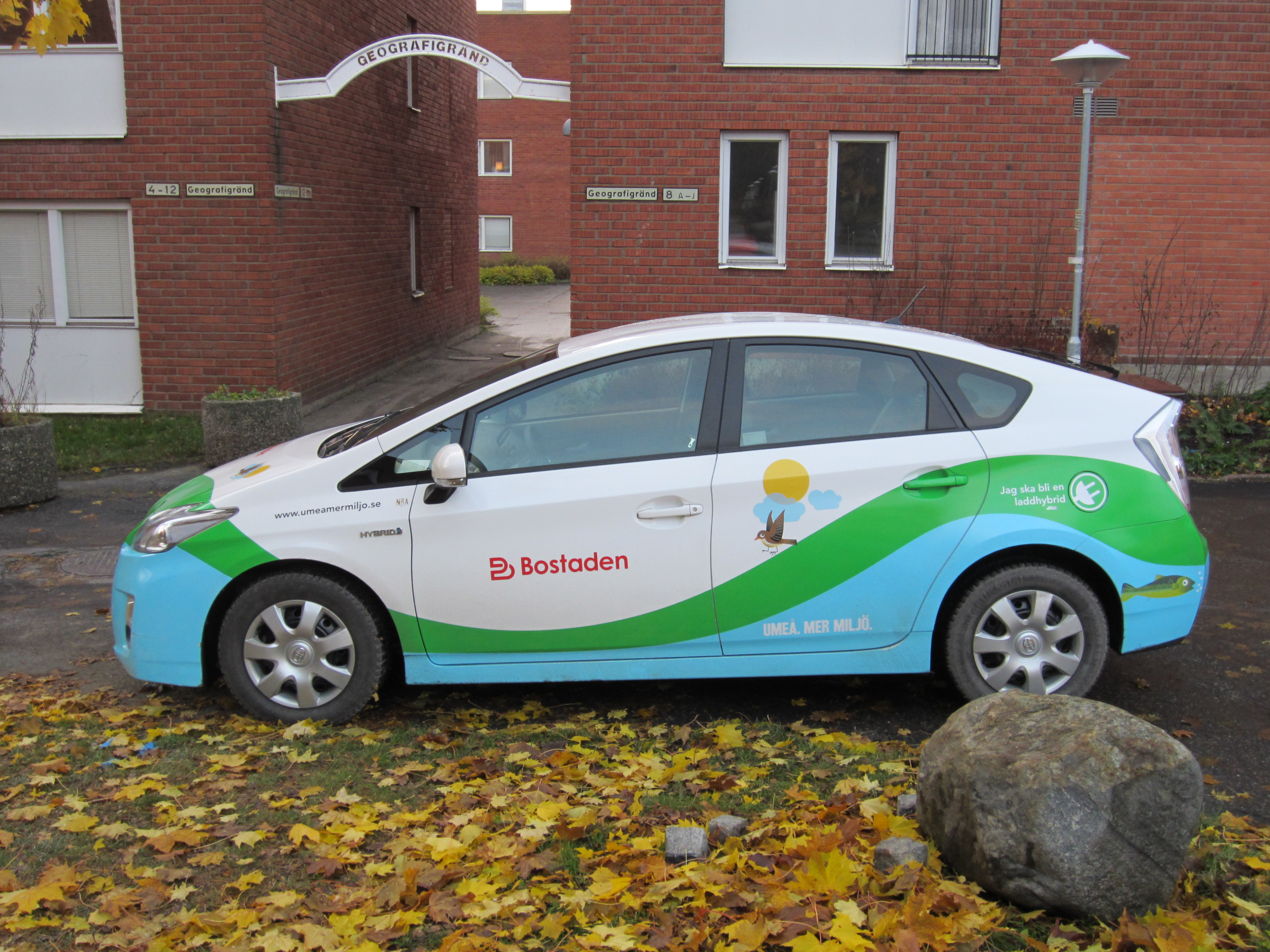
- Headquarters: Umeå, Sweden
- Key people: Ann-Sofi Tapani (CEO); Bernt Andersson (Chairman)
- Owner: Umeå Municipality
- Number of employees: 166 (2010)
- Website: bostaden.umea.se

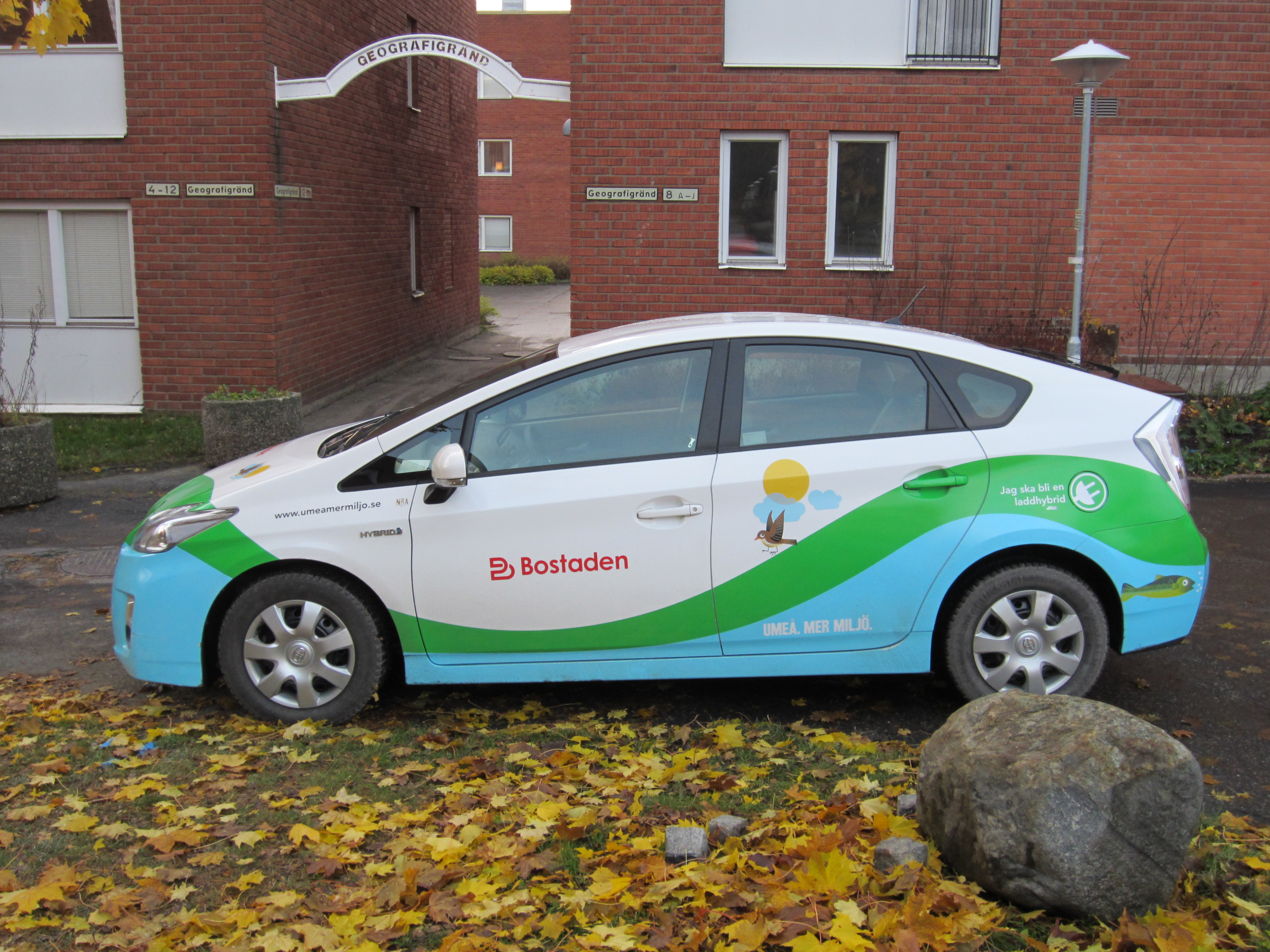
Bostaden uses hybrid-powered cars for environmental reasons

AB Bostaden is a municipally owned public housing company in Umeå Municipality. AB Bostaden is a subsidiary of Umeå kommunföretag AB, which in turn is owned by the Umeå Municipality. The company has a market share of about 45% of the housing rental market in Umeå and owns and manages about 15,000 apartments.

== History ==
Many of the apartments owned by AB Bostaden were built between 1965 and 1975 as part of the Million Programme. In 2010, they estimated that about 4,000 of their older apartments was in need of renovation. In 2009, AB Bostaden spent about 125 million SEK on maintenance.

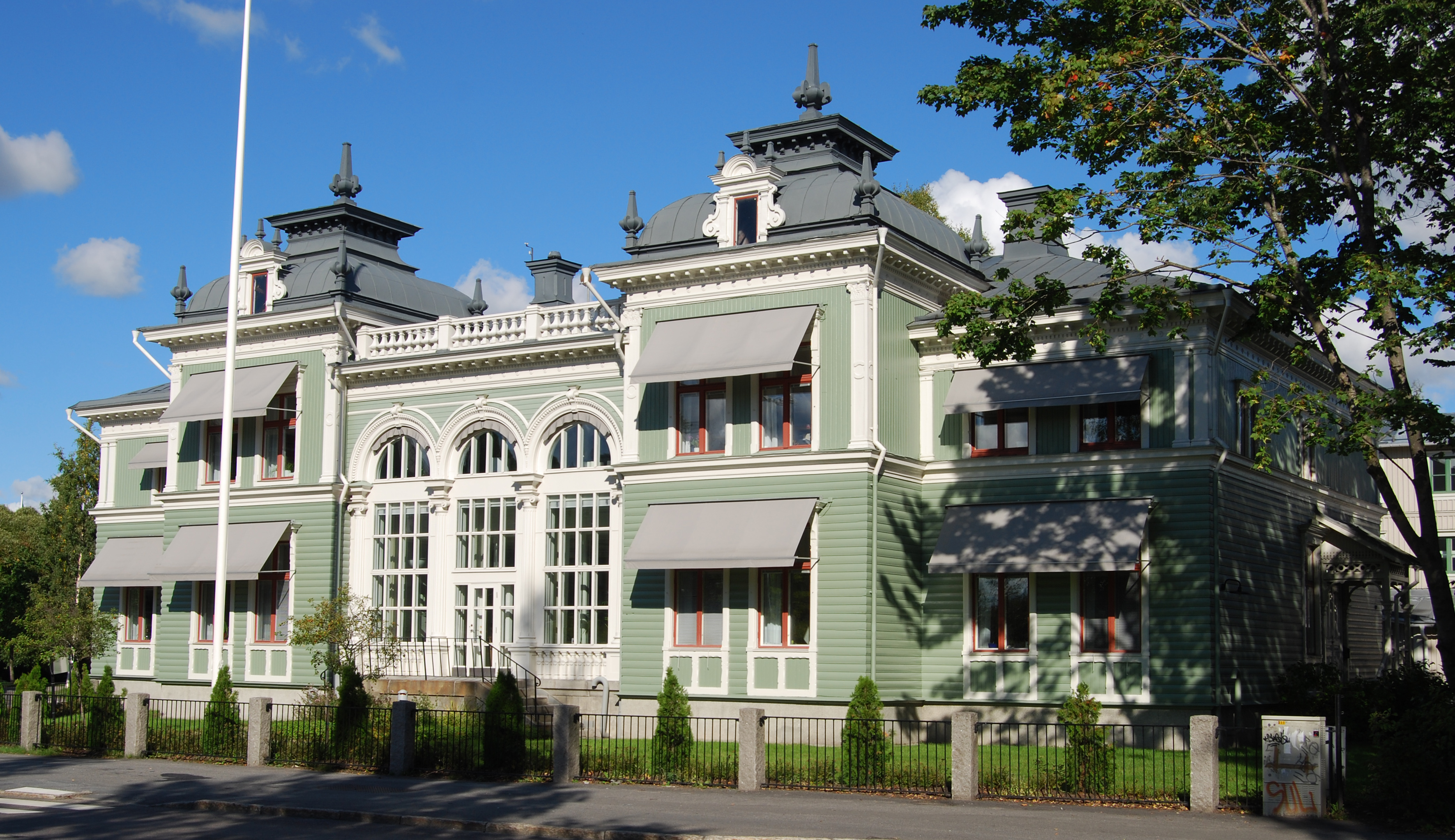
Moritzska gården, the headquarters for AB Bostaden.
