= Ålidhöjd =

- Residential area
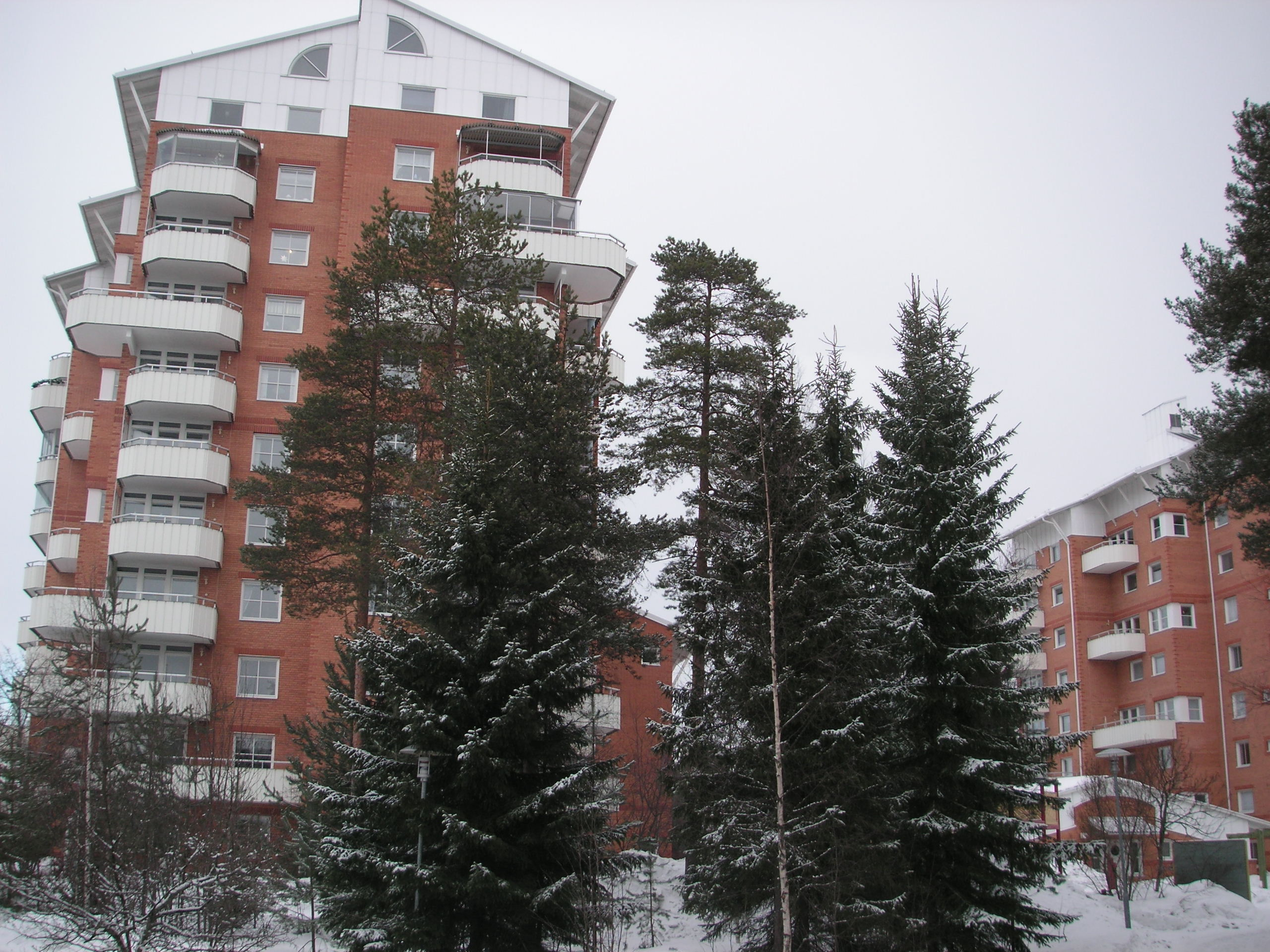
- Interactive map of Ålidhöjd
- Coordinates: 63°48′58″N 20°19′08″E
- Country: Sweden
- Province: Västerbotten
- County: Västerbotten County
- Municipality: Umeå Municipality
- Time zone: UTC+1 (CET)
  - Summer (DST): UTC+2 (CEST)

Ålidhöjd is a residential area in Umeå, Sweden.
