= Umeå Region =

The Umeå Region (Swedish: Umeåregionen) is a functional region which consists of six co-operating municipalities in north Sweden; Bjurholm, Nordmaling, Robertsfors, Umeå, Vindeln and Vännäs. The geographical area has over 140 000 inhabitants. The Umeå Region does not take official decisions about benefits, allowances, invalid vehicle services and similar tasks, but generates more money to urgent purposes through scale economy depending on joint distribution of service, personal union, mutual buy-ins, etc.
