= Rödäng =

- Residential area
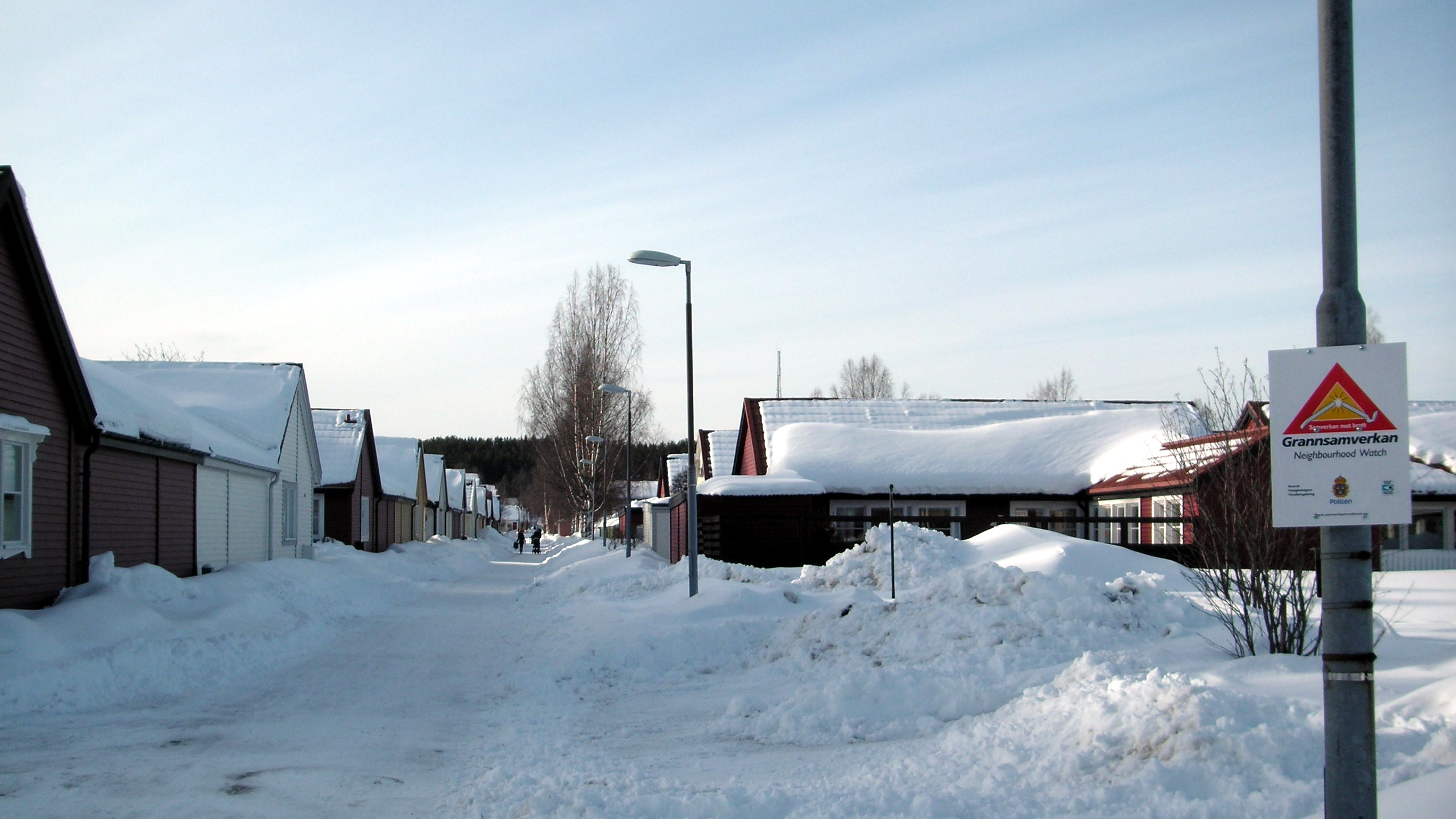
- Interactive map of Rödäng
- Coordinates: 63°50′22″N 20°13′02″E
- Country: Sweden
- Province: Västerbotten
- County: Västerbotten County
- Municipality: Umeå Municipality
- Time zone: UTC+1 (CET)
  - Summer (DST): UTC+2 (CEST)

Rödäng is a residential area in Umeå, Sweden.

Every street in Rödäng has a named related to music, with the exception of the main entrance road, Rödängsvägen.
