= Marcus Wallmark =

Swedish ice hockey player

- Born: August 9, 1991 (age 35) Umeå, Sweden
- Height: 5 ft 11 in (180 cm)
- Weight: 170 lb (77 kg; 12 st 2 lb)
- Position: Centre
- Shot: Left
- Played for: Skellefteå AIK
- Playing career: 2010–2018

Marcus Wallmark (born August 9, 1991) is a Swedish former professional ice hockey player. He played one game for Skellefteå AIK in the Elitserien during the 2010–11 Elitserien season.
