= Umeå =

City in Sweden

Umeå Ubmeje (Ume Sami)
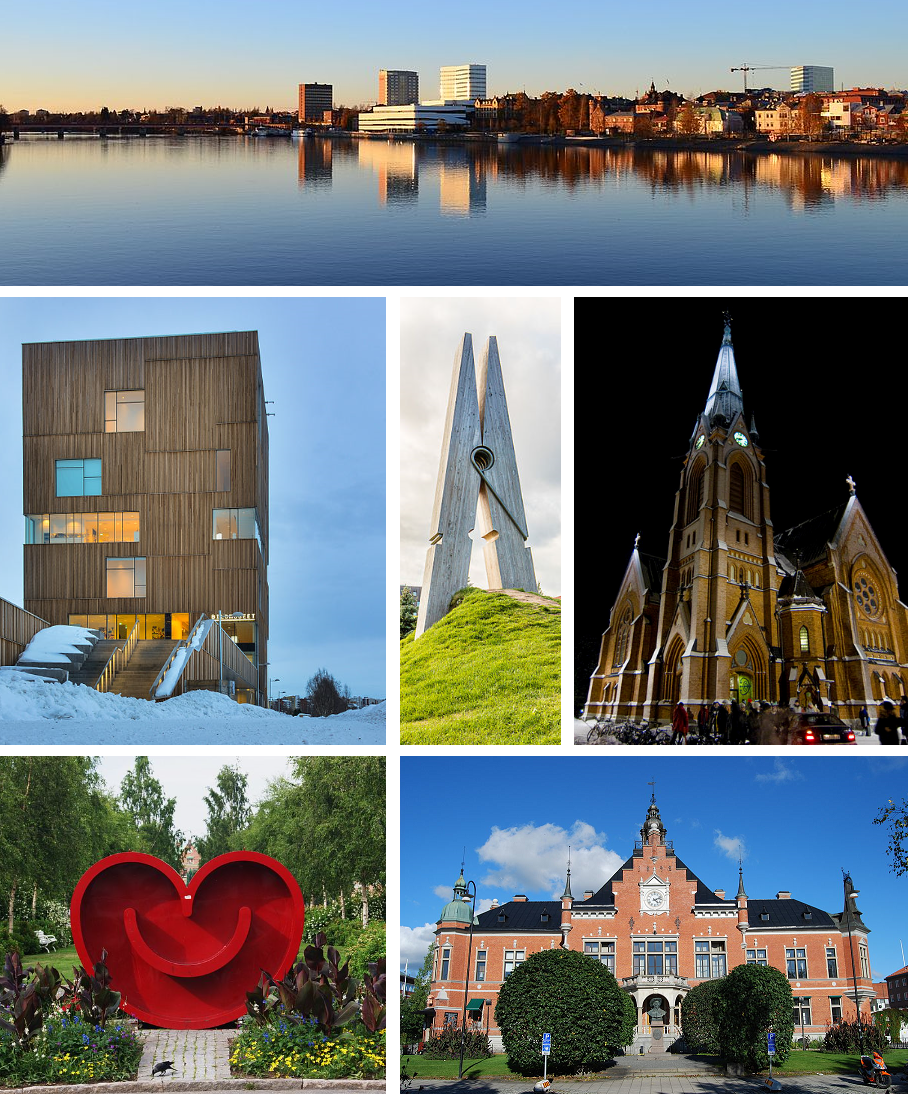
- From top: View over downtown showing Ume River, The Museum of Visual Arts, "Skin 4" at Umeå Arts Campus, Umeå City Church, the Heart Smiley, Umeå Town Hall
- Nicknames: Ume; Björkarnas Stad (Town of Birches)
- Location within Västerbotten Location within Sweden
- Coordinates: 63°49′30″N 20°15′50″E
- Country: Sweden
- County: Västerbotten County
- Municipality: Umeå
- Charter: 17th Century

Area
  - Urban: 31.8 km^{2} (12.3 sq mi)
- Elevation: 12 m (39 ft)

Population (31 December 2020)
  - City: 130,224
  - Rank: 13
  - Density: 2,818/km^{2} (7,300/sq mi)
- Time zone: UTC+1 (CET)
  - Summer (DST): UTC+2 (CEST)
- Postal code: 900 01 - 908 50
- Area code: (+46) 90
- Website: www.umea.se

Umeå (Swedish: [ˈʉ̌ːmɛɔ], locally: [ˈʉ̌ːmɛ]; Finnish and Meänkieli: Uumaja; Ume Sámi: Ubmeje) is a city in northeast Sweden. It is the seat of Umeå Municipality and the capital of Västerbotten County.

Situated on the Ume River, Umeå is the largest locality in Norrland and the thirteenth largest in Sweden, with a wider municipal population of 132,235 inhabitants in the beginning of 2023. When Umeå University was established in 1965, growth accelerated, and the amount of housing has doubled in 30 years from 1980 to 2010. As of 2018, Umeå was gaining around 1,000 inhabitants per year and the municipality plans for having 200,000 inhabitants by 2050. The projection of municipality size in 2050 has, however, been questioned as an overestimation in an independent study.

Umeå is a university town and centre of education, technical and medical research in northern Sweden. The two universities located in the city, Umeå University and one of the three main branches of SLU, host around 40,000 enrolled students, which corresponds to around 30% of the total population. (Note: SLU provides statistics only for the whole university, not distinguished by the location in which the study programme is held, which might be unclear for many courses provided. Therefore the number is not exact. However, only the at the Umeå University there are 37,985 students, which is more than 29% of the total population of Umeå.) CRISPR gene editing was developed by researchers, headed by Emmanuelle Charpentier at Umeå University, being awarded the 2020 Nobel Prize in Chemistry. Umeå was the European Capital of Culture during 2014, along with Riga in Latvia. Umeå is certified by the EarthCheck Sustainable Destinations program.

As of 2026, honorary consulates from twelve countries are located in Umeå: Denmark (since 1848), Finland (since 1921), Norway (since 1963), France (since 1989), the Republic of Seychelles (since 2001), Iceland (since 2002), Italy (since 2012), Lithuania (since 2012), Latvia (1939–1940; and again since 2014); and Estonia, the United Kingdom and Spain.

Umeå's municipality sees wide international cooperation within its involvement with twin towns and sister cities; which can be defined by its purpose of encouraging the exchange of experience and promote friendship at an international scale. Umeå currently has five twin towns and sister cities; with a foundational core being three Nordic twin cities since 1953: Harstad (town), Norway, Helsingør, Denmark, and Vaasa, Finland. With the remaining two sister cities being Saskatoon, Canada and Würzburg, Germany.

Umeå has been a member of International Cities of Refuge Network (ICORN) since 2016, one of 25 safe-cities within Sweden. There are currently 89 sanctuaries worldwide and since 2006 it has allowed more than 350 persecuted cultural practitioners to take safe-heaven in one of them.

The city has also been the home of Rally Sweden since 2022, one of the annual World Rally Championship (WRC) stages; and the only WRC stage taking place on snow.

== History ==
People have lived in the Umeå river valley for at least three thousand years. The oldest rock carvings near Umeå, ten kilometers west of the city at Norrforsen, are from about 3,000 BCE. In some places, there are remains of settlements and cultivation from the Bronze Age to the 11th century. During that period, the climate was mild, allowing for the cultivation of barley and wheat, while moose and beaver were hunted further inland.

The first written mention of Umeå dates from the 14th century. Before this time, the northern parts of Sweden, including the counties of Västerbotten County and Norrbotten County, were mostly settled by nomadic Sami people, though there is no evidence of a permanent settlement at the exact location of the city. The name Umeå is believed to derive from the Old Norse word Úma, meaning 'roaring'. The name of the town would therefore mean "The Roaring River".

The coast was permanently settled by Germanic peoples who traveled north along the Bothnian Bay by boat, which explains the Germanic names of towns and villages along the coast. Southern Västerbotten (including Umeå and Skellefteå) has had permanent Germanic settlements since at least the 14th century, and possibly since the Viking Age, or even earlier.

Umeå initially developed as a parish, with a wooden church and a trading post located in what is now known as Backen (or Kyrkbacken). Its location near the coast and by a river was probably one of the reasons that people chose to settle there.

For the next few centuries, Umeå remained a collection of scattered parishes where merchandise originating from the Sami people was traded. It was the last inhabited area before the northern wilderness. However, no proper town was built at the location selected by the king, and Umeå lost its town privileges in the 1590s.

In 1622, Gustavus Adolphus re-established the town. By 1638, it had about 40 houses. It suffered from Russian attacks in 1714 and in 1720, when it was burnt to the ground during the Russian Pillage of 1719–21. At the close of the Finnish War in 1809, a Russian army under Michael Andreas Barclay de Tolly captured Umeå and occupied it from June to August.

In 1874, the town plans were improved following a government mandate. Umeå had already begun making structural changes when, on 25 June 1888, a fire devastated the eastern parts of the town, leaving at least 2,300 of its 3,000 inhabitants homeless. During the restoration, almost 3,000 silver birch trees were planted along wide avenues to prevent future fires from spreading. For this reason Umeå is sometimes known as "Björkarnas Stad", the "City of Birches". The name of the Umeå ice-hockey team, Björklöven, translates to "The Birch Leaves".

== Geography ==
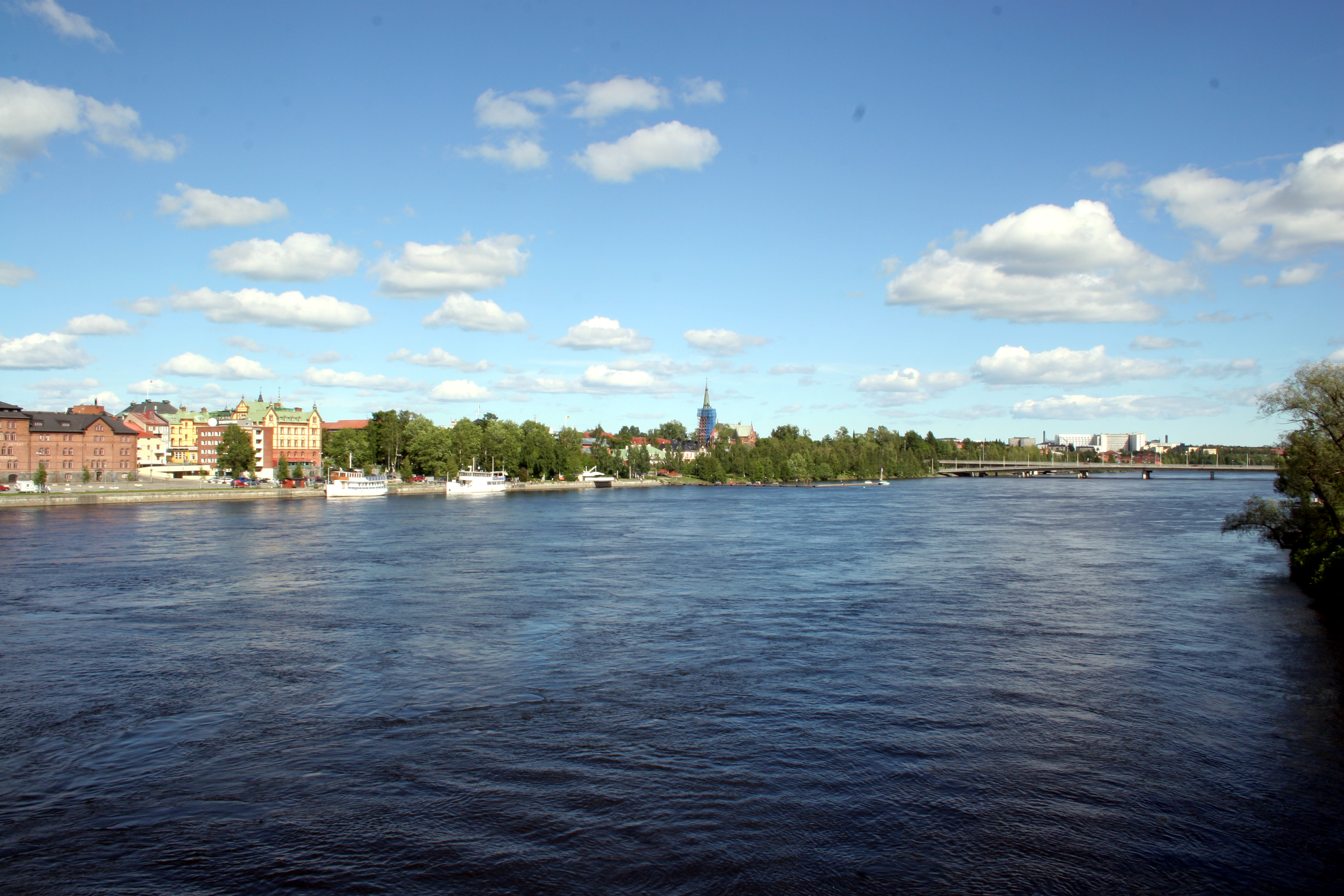
View of the Ume River by its estuary Umeå

Umeå is situated on the inlet of the Gulf of Bothnia at the mouth of the Ume River, in the south of Västerbotten. Umeå is about 600 km (373 mi) north of Stockholm and about 400 km (249 mi) south of the Arctic Circle. It is the largest city north of the Stockholm-Uppsala region, and is sometimes referred to as the regional centre of northern Sweden.

The nearby community of Holmsund serves as Umeå's port, with a ferry line connecting it to Vaasa (Swedish: Vasa) in Finland. This close connection to Finland influences Umeå's population, with many Sweden Finns residing in the city.

=== Residential areas and localities ===
==== Central ====
- Berghem
- Centrum
- Fridhem
- Gammlia
- Haga
- Sandbacka
- Umestan
- Väst på stan
- Öbacka
- Öbacka Strand
- Östermalm
- Öst på stan

==== West ====
- Backen
- Grisbacka
- Grubbe
- Klockarbäcken
- Kronoparken
- Kungsänget
- Lundåkern
- Rödäng
- Sandåkern
- Umedalen
- Västerslätt
- Västerhiske
- Ytterhiske

==== South ====
- Alvik
- Böle
- Böleäng
- Röbäck
- Röbäcksdalen
- Söderslätt
- Teg
- Ön

==== Southeast ====
- Carlshem
- Carlshöjd
- Carlslid
- Gimonäs
- Lilljansberget
- Sofiehem
- Tavleliden
- Tomtebo
- Tunnelbacken
- Universitetsområdet
- Ålidbacken
- Ålidhem
- Ålidhöjd

==== North/Northeast ====
- Ersboda
- Ersmark
- Marieberg
- Mariedal
- Mariehem
- Mariestrand
- Nydalahöjd
- Olofsdal
- Sandahöjd

=== Climate ===
Umeå has a subarctic climate (Dfc), bordering on a humid continental climate (Dfb) with short and fairly warm summers. Winters are lengthy and freezing but usually milder than in areas at the same latitude with a more continental climate.

Average January temperature is about −7 °C (19 °F), July is 16 °C (61 °F). Considering its proximity to a major water body and its latitude, summers are warmer than would be expected. The record high of 32.2 °C (90.0 °F) was recorded on 23 July 2014, during a very warm summer in Sweden. The record low of −38.2 °C (−36.8 °F) was recorded on 15 February 1978.

Climate data for Umeå airport, 1991–2020 normals & extremes since 1991 (Precipitation from Röbäcksdalen)
Month	Jan	Feb	Mar	Apr	May	Jun	Jul	Aug	Sep	Oct	Nov	Dec	Year
Record high °C (°F)	8.7 (47.7)	8.7 (47.7)	14.5 (58.1)	20.6 (69.1)	27.8 (82.0)	30.1 (86.2)	32.2 (90.0)	28.9 (84.0)	23.1 (73.6)	18.8 (65.8)	13.1 (55.6)	9.5 (49.1)	32.2 (90.0)
Mean maximum °C (°F)	4.6 (40.3)	5.0 (41.0)	9.0 (48.2)	14.4 (57.9)	21.1 (70.0)	24.6 (76.3)	26.8 (80.2)	24.5 (76.1)	19.8 (67.6)	13.4 (56.1)	7.9 (46.2)	5.7 (42.3)	27.8 (82.0)
Mean daily maximum °C (°F)	−2.6 (27.3)	−2.5 (27.5)	1.5 (34.7)	6.7 (44.1)	13.0 (55.4)	17.9 (64.2)	20.8 (69.4)	19.3 (66.7)	14.4 (57.9)	7.2 (45.0)	1.9 (35.4)	−0.8 (30.6)	8.1 (46.5)
Daily mean °C (°F)	−6.2 (20.8)	−6.5 (20.3)	−2.8 (27.0)	2.2 (36.0)	7.8 (46.0)	12.9 (55.2)	16.0 (60.8)	14.5 (58.1)	9.7 (49.5)	3.7 (38.7)	−0.8 (30.6)	−4.1 (24.6)	3.9 (39.0)
Mean daily minimum °C (°F)	−10.4 (13.3)	−11.0 (12.2)	−7.5 (18.5)	−2.5 (27.5)	2.1 (35.8)	7.2 (45.0)	10.7 (51.3)	9.5 (49.1)	5.1 (41.2)	0.0 (32.0)	−4.1 (24.6)	−7.9 (17.8)	−0.7 (30.7)
Mean minimum °C (°F)	−23.7 (−10.7)	−23.9 (−11.0)	−19.8 (−3.6)	−10.1 (13.8)	−4.1 (24.6)	0.6 (33.1)	4.1 (39.4)	2.0 (35.6)	−2.7 (27.1)	−10.1 (13.8)	−15.3 (4.5)	−19.9 (−3.8)	−26.7 (−16.1)
Record low °C (°F)	−35.1 (−31.2)	−32.6 (−26.7)	−28.9 (−20.0)	−19.2 (−2.6)	−7.0 (19.4)	−3.6 (25.5)	1.1 (34.0)	−1.2 (29.8)	−8.5 (16.7)	−20.2 (−4.4)	−23.5 (−10.3)	−29.9 (−21.8)	−35.1 (−31.2)
Average precipitation mm (inches)	46.4 (1.83)	35.5 (1.40)	33.8 (1.33)	31.8 (1.25)	42.0 (1.65)	48.7 (1.92)	68.7 (2.70)	75.7 (2.98)	56.3 (2.22)	69.0 (2.72)	66.8 (2.63)	59.9 (2.36)	634.6 (24.99)
Mean monthly sunshine hours	35	81	156	213	270	287	276	221	153	95	43	23	1,853
Source 1: SMHI Open Data
Source 2: SMHI 1991–2020 normals

Climate data for Umeå Airport (2002–2018 averages & extremes for the city since 1882)
Month	Jan	Feb	Mar	Apr	May	Jun	Jul	Aug	Sep	Oct	Nov	Dec	Year
Record high °C (°F)	12.0 (53.6)	9.0 (48.2)	14.5 (58.1)	21.5 (70.7)	27.8 (82.0)	33.5 (92.3)	32.2 (90.0)	30.2 (86.4)	25.5 (77.9)	18.8 (65.8)	13.4 (56.1)	9.5 (49.1)	33.5 (92.3)
Mean maximum °C (°F)	4.1 (39.4)	4.9 (40.8)	9.4 (48.9)	14.9 (58.8)	22.4 (72.3)	24.8 (76.6)	27.0 (80.6)	25.2 (77.4)	20.0 (68.0)	13.6 (56.5)	8.4 (47.1)	5.5 (41.9)	28.0 (82.4)
Mean daily maximum °C (°F)	−3.2 (26.2)	−2.6 (27.3)	1.8 (35.2)	7.2 (45.0)	13.6 (56.5)	18.0 (64.4)	21.4 (70.5)	19.8 (67.6)	14.9 (58.8)	7.4 (45.3)	2.3 (36.1)	−0.6 (30.9)	8.3 (47.0)
Daily mean °C (°F)	−7.2 (19.0)	−6.9 (19.6)	−3.0 (26.6)	2.4 (36.3)	8.1 (46.6)	12.5 (54.5)	16.2 (61.2)	14.8 (58.6)	10.1 (50.2)	3.6 (38.5)	−0.9 (30.4)	−4.4 (24.1)	3.8 (38.8)
Mean daily minimum °C (°F)	−11.1 (12.0)	−11.1 (12.0)	−7.7 (18.1)	−2.4 (27.7)	2.5 (36.5)	7.0 (44.6)	10.9 (51.6)	9.7 (49.5)	5.2 (41.4)	−0.2 (31.6)	−4.0 (24.8)	−8.1 (17.4)	−0.8 (30.6)
Mean minimum °C (°F)	−24.9 (−12.8)	−24.3 (−11.7)	−20.4 (−4.7)	−10.0 (14.0)	−4.3 (24.3)	−0.2 (31.6)	3.8 (38.8)	1.5 (34.7)	−2.8 (27.0)	−10.5 (13.1)	−14.9 (5.2)	−19.8 (−3.6)	−27.5 (−17.5)
Record low °C (°F)	−38.0 (−36.4)	−38.2 (−36.8)	−32.4 (−26.3)	−25.5 (−13.9)	−9.0 (15.8)	−4.5 (23.9)	−1.0 (30.2)	−2.5 (27.5)	−7.5 (18.5)	−20.2 (−4.4)	−29.0 (−20.2)	−34.0 (−29.2)	−38.2 (−36.8)
Average precipitation mm (inches)	37.3 (1.47)	29.8 (1.17)	27.7 (1.09)	28.7 (1.13)	45.0 (1.77)	63.5 (2.50)	76.2 (3.00)	71.1 (2.80)	38.9 (1.53)	51.9 (2.04)	52.3 (2.06)	44.4 (1.75)	566.8 (22.31)
Mean monthly sunshine hours	30.8	73.8	166.9	212.2	271.3	285.2	287.9	223.9	157.1	103.4	47.9	26.0	1,886.4

== Demographics ==
Population of Umeå

Year	Pop.
1960	32,492
1965	39,889
1970	47,692
1975	49,715
1980	52,719
1990	60,305

Year	Pop.
1995	68,494
2000	70,959
2005	75,645
2010	79,594
2015	83,249

Source: SCB

The population of Umeå has grown consistently since the 1960s, when the university was built. In part because of the university, the town has attracted many residents from outside of Sweden, as well as students from other regions of Sweden.

As of 2015, 10.4% of the population in the municipality of Umeå were foreign-born. The largest national origin group is from Finland, followed by Iraq, Iran and Somalia.

In April 2017, the Jewish association in Umeå closed after receiving multiple threats from neo-Nazis, allegedly associated with the Nordic Resistance Movement.

== Transportation ==
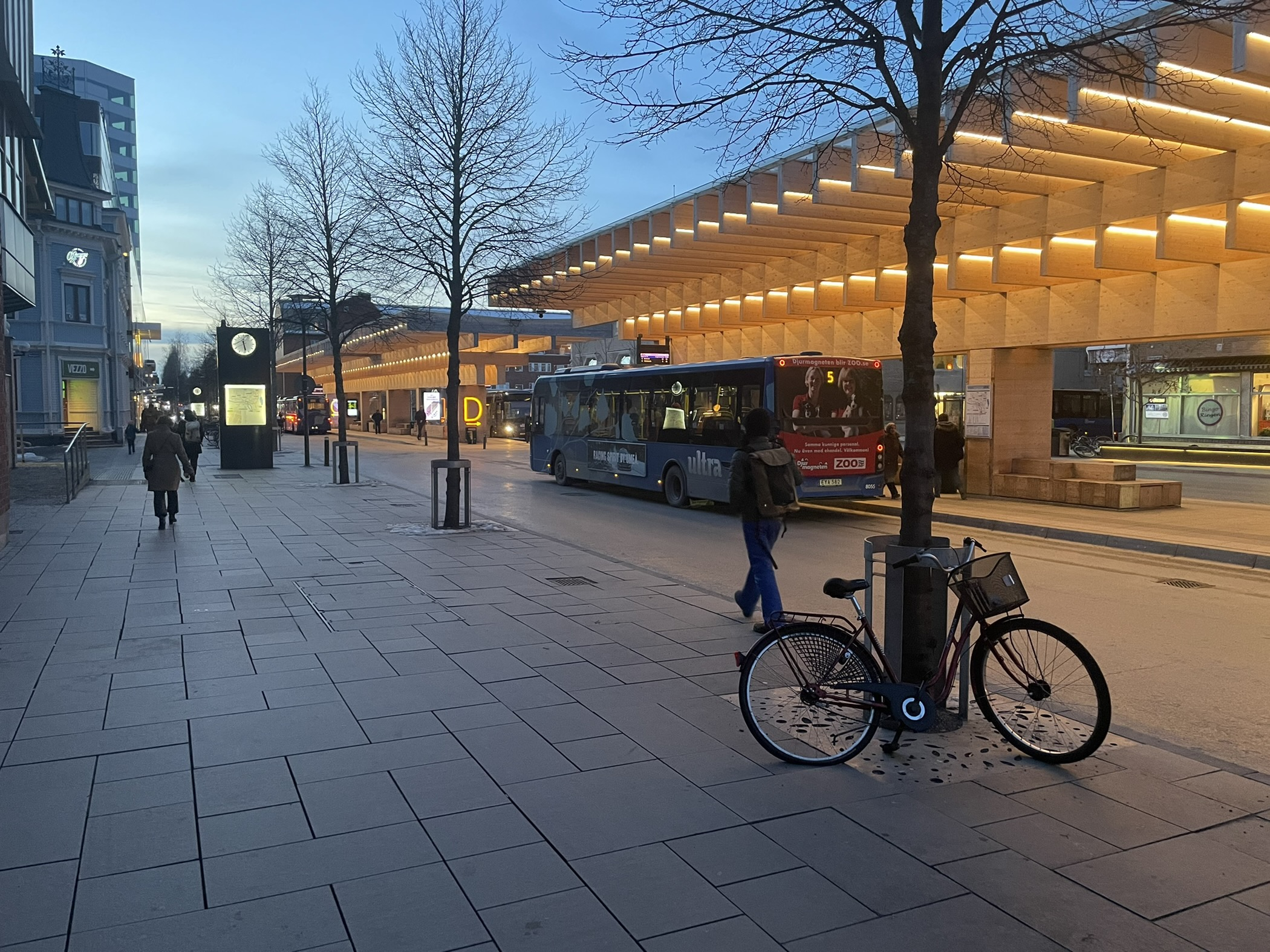
The central bus stop Vasaplan in Umeå.

The road infrastructure includes two European highways (E4 and E12) which pass the city. Umeå is located along the Blue Highway, which is an international tourist route from Mo i Rana, Norway to Pudozh, Russia via Finland.

The local bus system is centred at Vasaplan in the city centre, and has multiple routes travelling throughout the city. About 4 kilometres (2 miles) from the city centre is Umeå Airport. It is the 7th largest airport in Sweden by number of passengers, with 844,932 passengers in 2010.

The Bothnia Line (Botniabanan) connects to Umeå from the south, it runs along the High Coast via Örnsköldsvik to Umeå. This railway was opened on 28 August 2010. The new railway line is 190 km (118 mi) long, containing 140 bridges and 25 kilometres (16 miles) of tunnels. It provides Umeå with a fast train connection to Stockholm (6 1/2 hours). A new railway station, Umeå East Station, was built in connection to Norrland's University Hospital and Umeå University.

The Wasaline ferry takes four hours to arrive in Vaasa, Finland.

== Culture ==
The Opera of northern Sweden, the Norrland Opera, is based in the city, as is the English-language non-profit Umeå Theatre Company and the Museum of Contemporary Art and Visual Culture. The annual Umeå Jazz Festival is one of the larger Scandinavian festivals for modern jazz.

Well-known metal bands from Umeå include Cult of Luna, Gotham City, Bewitched, Meshuggah, Naglfar, Nocturnal Rites and Persuader. During the 1990s, the influence of Umeå hardcore punk bands such as Final Exit, Step Forward, Refused, Abhinanda, DS-13, Shield and Doughnuts and the local labels Desperate Fight Records and Busted Heads Records led to the growth of Umeå's hardcore scene. During the 90's the town were the European center of Straight Edge culture housing hardcore and straight edge shows on a weekly basis for many years. This youth culture was documented in an exhibition called "Umeå—the European Capital of Hardcore 1989–2000." at Västerbottens Museum in 2013. Independent record label Ny Våg was headquartered in Umeå, and have released records of Umeå artists such as AC4, Masshysteri and Invasionen.

In 2009, the town was designated European Capital of Culture for 2014, along with Riga.

Umeå is the centre of television in northern Sweden; SVT Nord and TV4's northern region office are both based in the city. The main newspapers of the county of Västerbotten, Västerbottens-Kuriren and Västerbottens Folkblad are also based in Umeå.

The background and setting for the video game Unravel are based on landscapes around Umeå.

== Sports ==
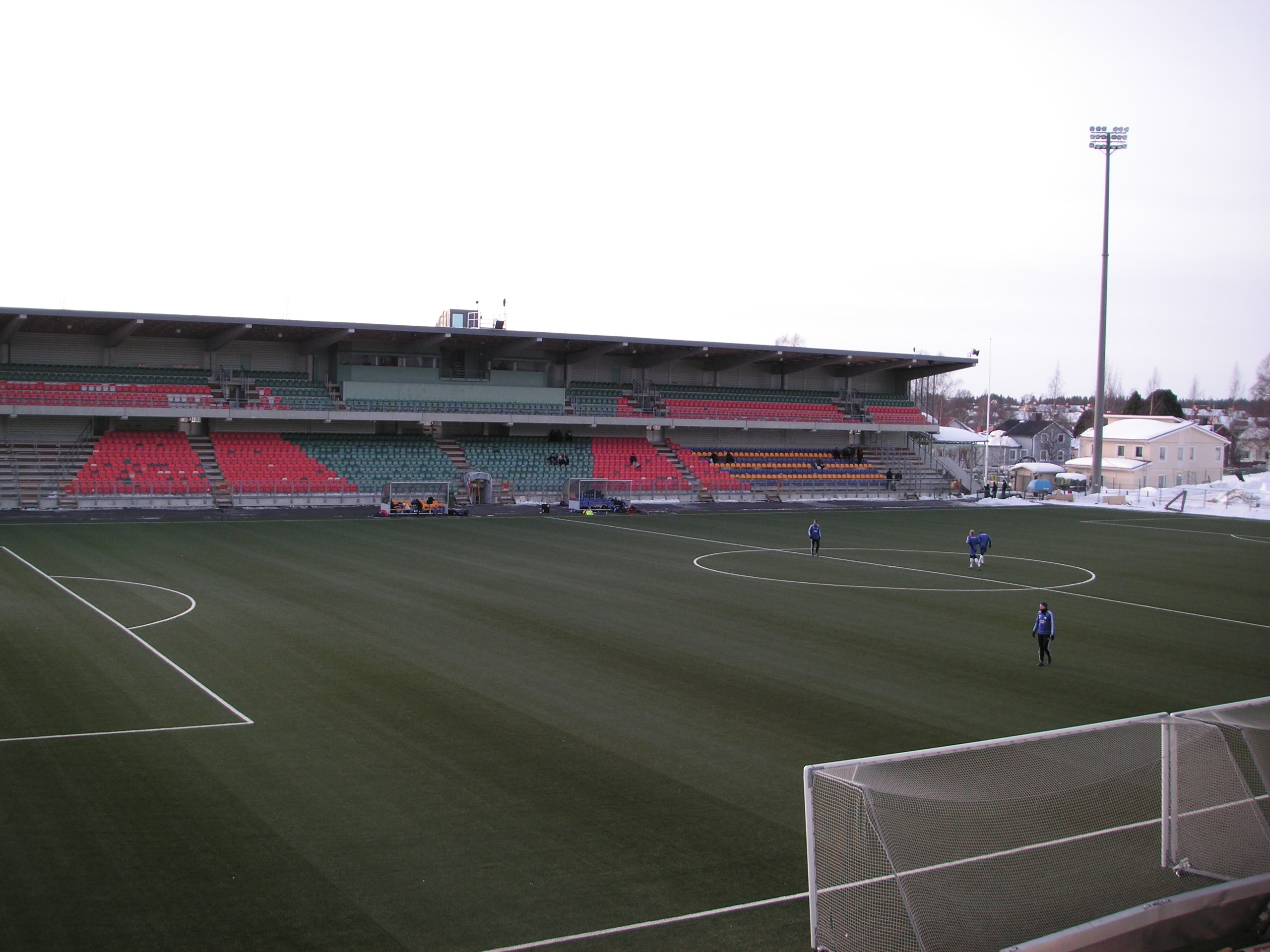
Umeå Energi Arena

The city of Umeå currently hosts four major sports clubs. The women's football club is Umeå IK. The men's hockey team IF Björklöven was very successful in the 1980s but has been less successful in recent years. Björklöven are currently playing in the Swedish second-tier league HockeyAllsvenskan while Umeå IK plays in the top Swedish women's football league Damallsvenskan. IBK Dalen and Team Thorengruppen are among the major floorball teams in Sweden. Other sports clubs include IFK Umeå, BK Ume-Trixa, Mariehem SK, Umeå FC, and Umedalens IF.

In 2018 and 2020, Umeå was named Sweden's best sports city by SVT Sport.

In 2011, a baseball and softball team, Umeå Baseboll & Softbol|klubb, was founded. The team has 2 former national team players as coaches and currently plays in Norra Regionserien.

Umeå is also the host city of the FIA World Rally Championship's Rally Sweden. In 2022 Rally Sweden officially relocated to the northern Swedish city of Umeå after being held in the province of Värmland since its foundation in 1950. The primary reason for its relocation was that Umeå is considered a more snow safe region.

== Education and research ==
Umeå University has about 37,000 students and 4,200 staff. The establishment of the university in the mid-1960s led to a population expansion from about 50,000 inhabitants to today's 121,032. The expansion continues, with about 1100 new inhabitants every year, and has made Umeå a modern, somewhat intellectual city to add to the traditional basis of heavy industry for cities along the coast of northern Sweden (Norrland). In 1951 the university's library was recognised as important for northern Sweden. The library is given a copy of every new book printed in Sweden.

The Swedish University of Agricultural Sciences or Sveriges Lantbruksuniversitet is a university in Sweden. Although its head office is located in Uppsala (Ultuna), the university has several campuses in different parts of Sweden, including Umeå. Unlike other government-run universities in Sweden, it is funded through the budget for the Ministry of Enterprise and Innovation.

The university hospital serves the entire region of northern Sweden.

The Minerva Gymnasium, a private school for secondary education, is located in Umeå.

== Economy ==
Key research fields of the University are life sciences (especially medical and cell and the molecular biology of plants), human-technology interaction, social welfare, ecology and gender perspectives.

The Umeå University works collaboratively with companies such as ABB, Volvo, Skanska, Ericsson, and Öhrlings PwC.

The Swedish University of Agricultural Sciences (SLU) in Umeå, with Umeå Plant Science Centre, is another major site of research and education.

Notable companies based in Umeå include:

- GE Healthcare, which produces chromatography systems such as FPLC, HPLC and DNA sequencer equipment.
- Handelsbanken, HQ in the northern region of Sweden.
- Komatsu Forest, European HQ.
- Siemens Financial Services, Scandinavian HQ.
- Volvo Trucks.
- Nasdaq Technology AB
- Ålö AB, production facilities for tractor front-end loaders.

== Notable people ==
Athletes

- Sebastian Aho
- Björn Berg
- Jesper Blomqvist
- Jörgen Brink
- Åsa Elfving
- Per Elofsson
- Fredrik Ericsson
- Carl Grundström
- Hanna Ljungberg
- Mikael Lustig
- Gunnar Nordahl
- Maria Pietilä Holmner
- Anja Pärson
- Assar Rönnlund
- Patrik Sundström
- Daniel Tjärnqvist
- Tor Troéng
- Marcus Wallmark

Musicians

- Thomas Hedlund
- Karl Backman
- Katarina Barruk
- Eva Dahlgren
- Mats Gustafsson
- Frida Hyvönen
- Inge Johansson
- Daniel Lindström
- Dennis Lyxzén
- Lisa Miskovsky
- Nicklas Nygren
- David Sandström
- Kristofer Steen
- Tove Styrke
- Morgan Ågren
- Fricky
- Infernus
- Fredrik Thordendal/Meshuggah

Politicians

- Ibrahim Baylan
- Kjell-Olof Feldt
- Jonas Sjöstedt
- Ola Ullsten
- Margot Wikström

Other

- Stieg Larsson, novelist
- Stig Lindberg, artist
- David Sandberg, film director and actor
- Amanda Kernell, film director and screenwriter
- Forsen, video game streamer
- William Spetz, television personality and actor
- Vinesauce Joel, video game streamer

== See also ==
- Blue Highway, an international tourist route from Norway to Russia via Sweden and Finland
- Umeå Region
