= Tomtebo =

Residential area of Umeå, Sweden

- Residential area
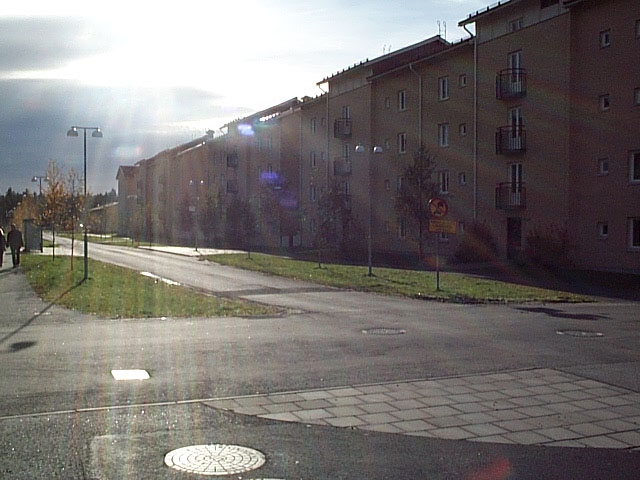
- Vättarnas allé, a street in Tomtebo.

- Location within Sweden
- Coordinates: 63°48′N 20°21′E
- Country: Sweden
- Province: Västerbotten
- County: Västerbotten County
- Municipality: Umeå Municipality

Area
  - Total: 0.26 km^{2} (0.10 sq mi)

Population (2005-12-31)
  - Total: 633
  - Density: 2,442/km^{2} (6,320/sq mi)
- Time zone: UTC+1 (CET)
  - Summer (DST): UTC+2 (CEST)

Tomtebo is a residential area in Umeå, Sweden. It is located next to the lake Nydalasjön.

Tomtebo was counted as a separate locality between 2000 and 2005, and had 633 inhabitants in 2005.
