= Von Ahnska magasinet =

Port warehouse in Umeå, Sweden

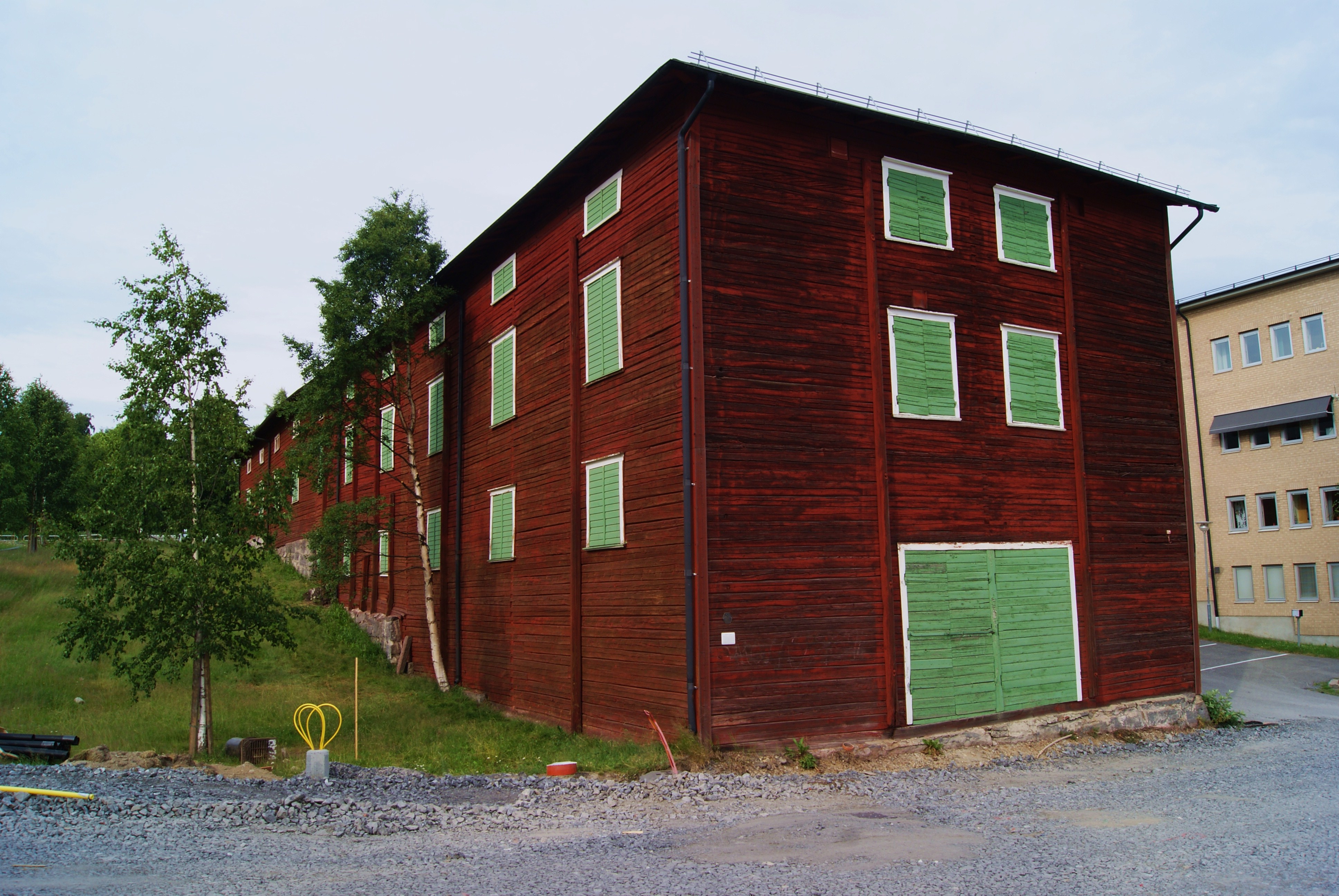
- Von Ahnska magasinet in July 2011.

General information
- Status: Completed
- Type: Warehouse
- Address: Storgatan 32
- Town or city: Umeå
- Country: Sweden
- Coordinates: 63°49′33″N 20°15′12″E
- Completed: 1888

Design and construction
- Architect(s): Ludwig August von Hedenberg

Von Ahnska magasinet is a port warehouse, which is located on Storgatan in Umeå, Sweden. The warehouse was originally a wooden barn built by Lieutenant Colonel Ludwig August von Hedenberg in 1887. The building survived the great fire of 1888. During the same year, the merchant Johan Viktor von Ahn bought the building which he extended towards the Ume River.

Nowadays the building is owned by Umeå Energi, whose headquarters are located between Von Ahnska magasinet and Gamla bankhuset. Since 1980 the building has been a listed building.
