= Gamla bankhuset =

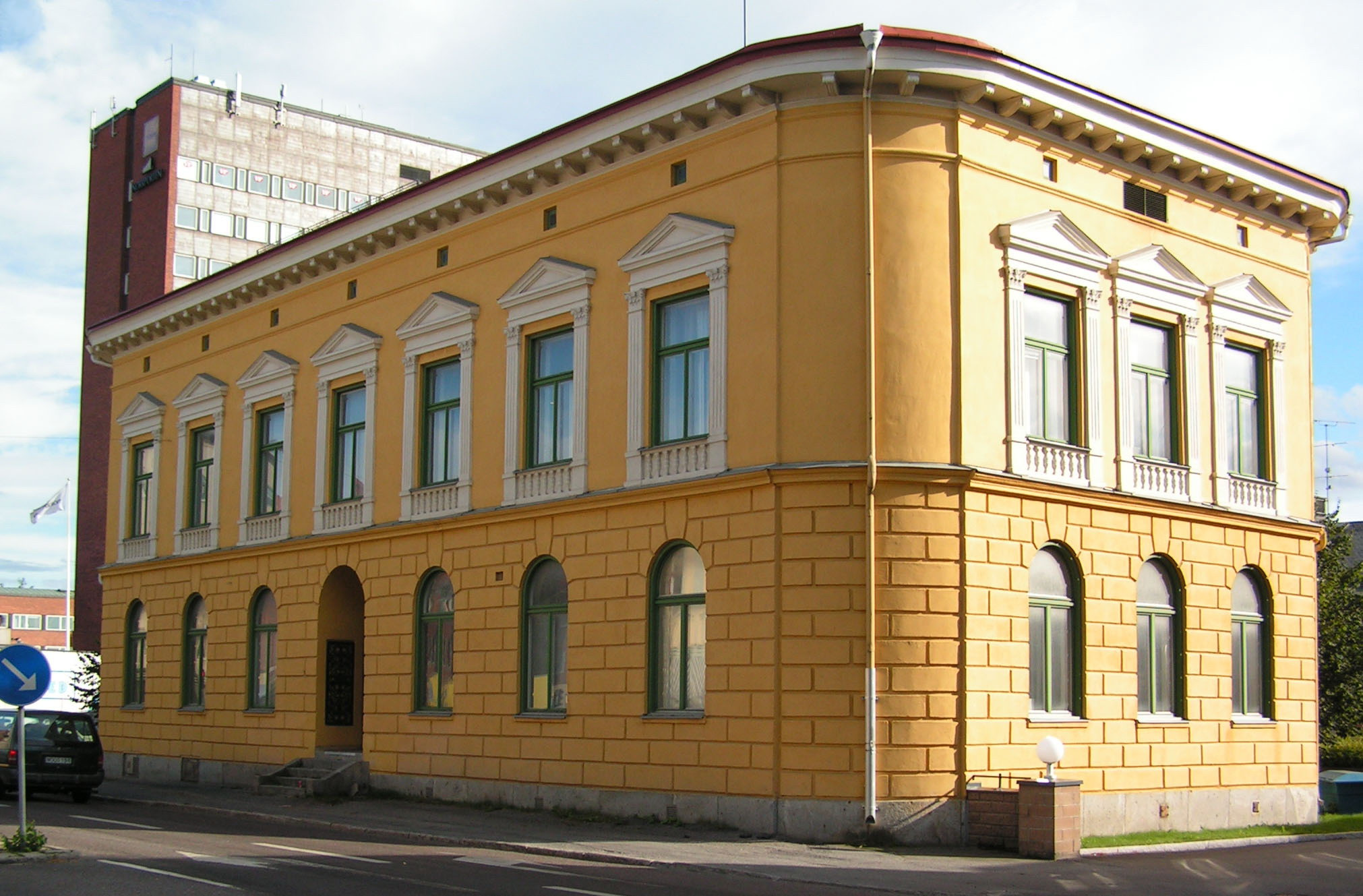
- Smörasken from North-West in 2007. In the background the building Thulehuset is visible.
- Alternative names: Smörasken

General information
- Status: Listed buildings in Sweden
- Type: Bank building
- Architectural style: Neo-Renaissance style
- Address: Storgatan 34
- Town or city: Umeå
- Country: Sweden
- Coordinates: 63°49′34.0″N 20°15′17.4″E
- Completed: 1877
- Renovated: 1992
- Owner: Umeå Energi

Design and construction
- Architect(s): Axel Cederberg

Gamla bankhuset in Umeå, Sweden is a listed yellow two-storey stone building in Neo-Renaissance style that was built in 1877. The building is located at Storgatan 34, by the north stronghold of the bridge Tegsbron. Because of the building's rounded corners it has been nicknamed Smörasken (the "Butter dish").

== The building ==
The building is built of stone in a typical renaissance style by a floor plan from 1877 by Axel Cederberg at the Road and Waterway Construction Service Corps. Cederberg was at this time the city's technical advisor. The building has two floors and is painted yellow. Originally the bank hall and the offices were located on the ground floor and the upper floor was for the bank manager. The upper floor had a big apartment with six rooms and a bachelor room.

== History ==
The building was Westerbottens enskilda banks' first bank building. After the great fire in Umeå in 1888 the possibility of opening a new bank building that was more centrally located and had a better representative position became possible. In 1894 the bank moved its operations to the new bank building, what currently is Handelsbanken at Rådhusparken's east side. The old bank building was instead used as an apartment building. The building has over the years housed various businesses, including being a temporary storehouse for Västerbottens museum's collections 1936-1946, Umeå City Library 1935-1954. The house is since 1980 a listed building, and is now owned by Umeå Energi, which in 1992 did extensive restorations.
