= Storgatan, Umeå =

Street in Umeå, Sweden

Storgatan
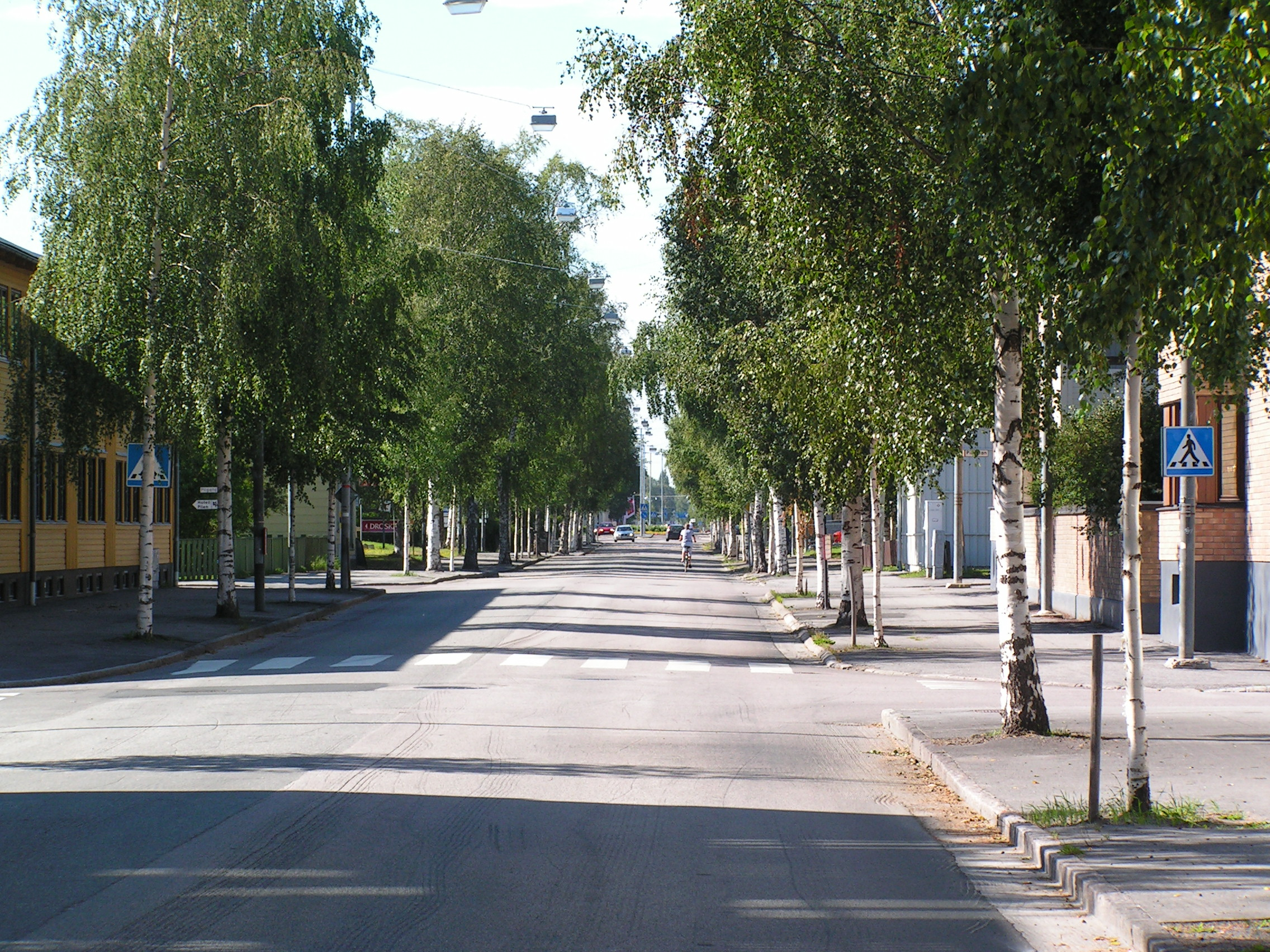
- The eastern part of Storgatan.
- Former name(s): Södra långgatan
- Length: 4 km (2.5 mi)
- Location: Umeå, Sweden
- Coordinates: 63°49′45.63″N 20°14′10.97″E
- From: East
- To: West

Construction
- Inauguration: 1622

Other
- Known for: Its birch avenue

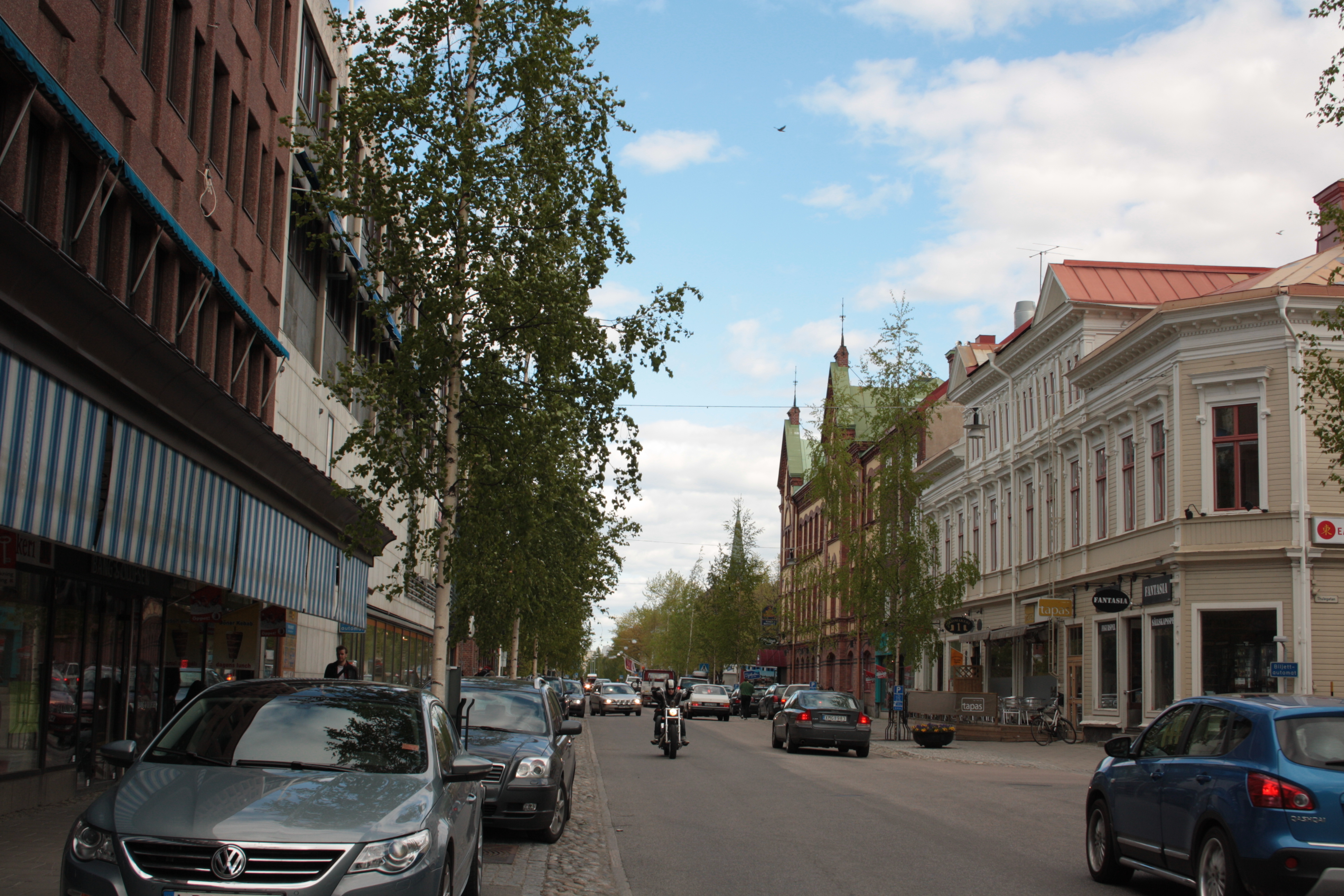
Storgatan in central Umeå.

Storgatan ("Main Street" or literally "Great Street") is one of the longer streets in Umeå (Sweden), about 4 kilometers long. Storgatan passes by the main city areas on the north side of Ume River. The street reaches from the old city limits at Tvärån in the west to Umeå East Station, near the Norrland's University Hospital, in the east.

Along Storgatan lies a number of Umeå Municipality's historic buildings, and five of the city's major parks. On average around 8,900 vehicles per day passes on this street (2006).

== History ==
When Umeå was founded in 1622, on the northern side of the Ume River, it was staked out in a grid pattern with two longitudinal streets parallel to the river and five perpendicular alleys that ran all the way to the river. The southern long street (nowadays Storgatan) continued onwards from the city limits in the form of the coastal road that ranged between Stockholm and Tornio.

The coastal road's local route went from Röbäck, to the ferry location on the Ume River at Backenkyrkan (literally "The Hillside Church"), through Umeå and then around Nydalasjön's southern tip and on to Innertavle.

In 1780, Storgatan was paved and in 1782 the houses along it received house numbers, since it was decided that all houses and farms in Umeå should be numbered. The number had to be painted on a wooden board and nailed above the main entrances.

In 1864 Umeå got a new city plan, which had influences from Nikolaistad (Vaasa) that was rebuilt after a fire in 1852.

In this plan the width of the streets were extended. The width of Storgatan increased from about 4–5 meters to roughly 18 meters (60 feet). The new plan also made room for sidewalks and plant beddings along the street. These approximately 3 meters (10 feet) wide beddings had to be planted with flowers and shrubs at the homeowner's expense. The house owners even got a fencing obligation, meaning that a property facing the street must be enclosed by a plank wall or fence, and it had to be built in a "tasteful" style. However those rules did not apply to already developed areas, for cost reasons.

In 1866 the new building ordinance for Umeå established that along the pavement edge suitable broadleaf trees had to be planted at regular intervals and thus Umeå had it first street birches. These were planted along the western part of Storgatan. However, the planting of birches on the city sidewalks was not done on a large scale until after the 1888 fire. In 1892 it was decided that the birch tree was the most suitable tree to plant on the city sidewalks.

The transformation of the City Centre in the 1950 - 1960 centuries also affected the buildings along Storgatan. Only a few of the old wooden houses were spared from being demolishing and the rest was replaced by modern buildings, such as the 1963 Domus department store (the current MVG mall) that has one of its sides to Storgatan.

In 2002, the center part of Storgatan was restored to have a more original look. The street got a 6.5 meter wide carriageway and a 5 meter wide walkway with birch trees on both sides of the roadway. Between the birches parking spots where added.

== Listed buildings along Storgatan ==
Along Storgatan a number of listed buildings are located: Gamla lasarettet, Bagare Thillmans gård, Gamla slöjdskolan, Löjtnant Grahns gård, The Court of Appeal for Upper Norrland, Färgare Höglanders gård, von Ahnska magasinet, Gamla bankhuset ("Smörasken"), Sparbankshuset, Umeå Town Hall, Handelsbanken, Riksbankshuset, Moritzska gården, Scharinska villan, Ringstrandska villan, Länsresidenset and Umeå Old Prison.
