= Frederick Lindstrom =

Frederick Lindstrom may refer to:

- Freddie Lindstrom (1905–1981), American baseball player
- Fredrik Lindström (writer) (born 1963), Swedish film director, radio and TV presenter, writer, linguist and comedy performer
- Fredrik Lindström (biathlete) (born 1989), Swedish biathlete
- Fredrik Olaus Lindström (1847–1919), Swedish architect
