= Umeå Town Hall =

Town hall building in Umeå, Switzerland

- Umeå rådhus
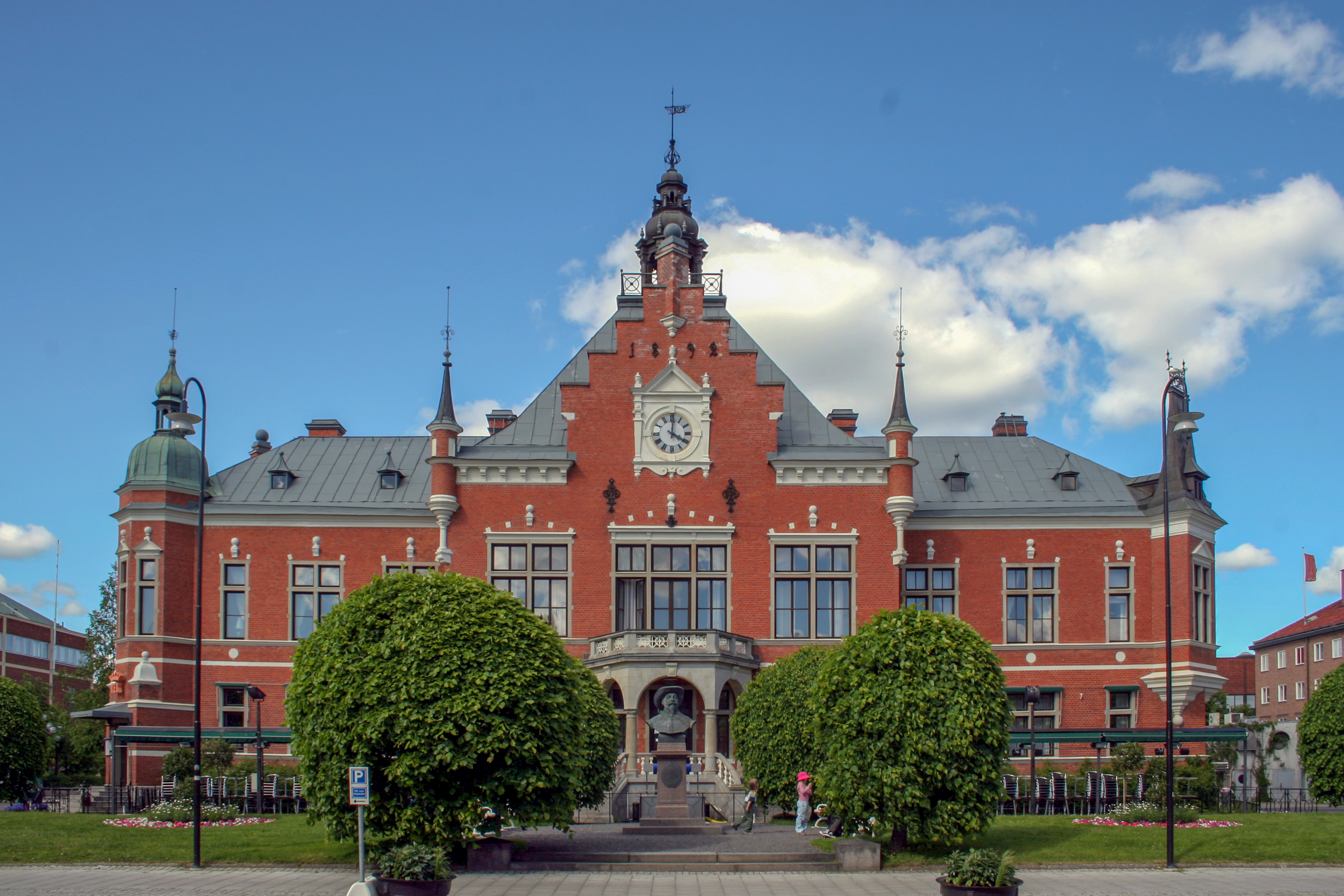
- The town hall photographed from Ume River.

General information
- Status: Listed buildings in Sweden (since 26 January 1981)
- Type: Town hall
- Architectural style: Dutch Renaissance Revival architecture
- Address: Rådhustorget
- Town or city: Umeå
- Country: Sweden
- Coordinates: 63°49′30″N 20°15′46″E
- Completed: 1890
- Owner: Umeå kommun

Design and construction
- Architect(s): Fredrik Olaus Lindström

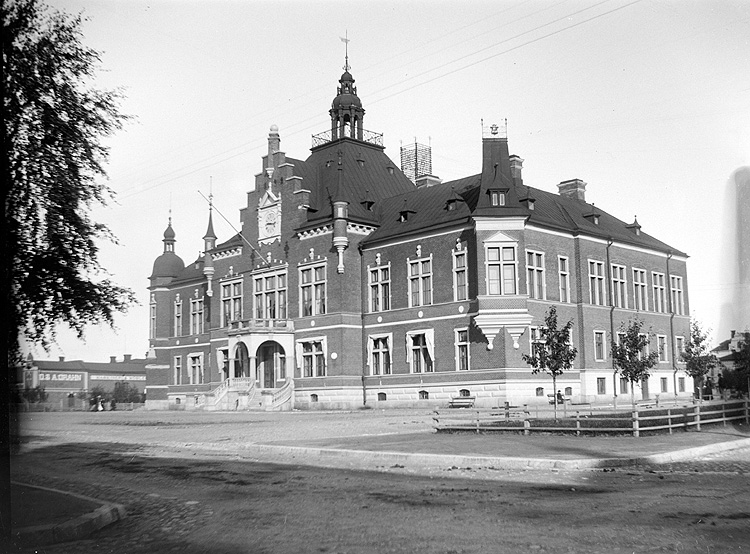
A photo of Umeå Town Hall in 1902

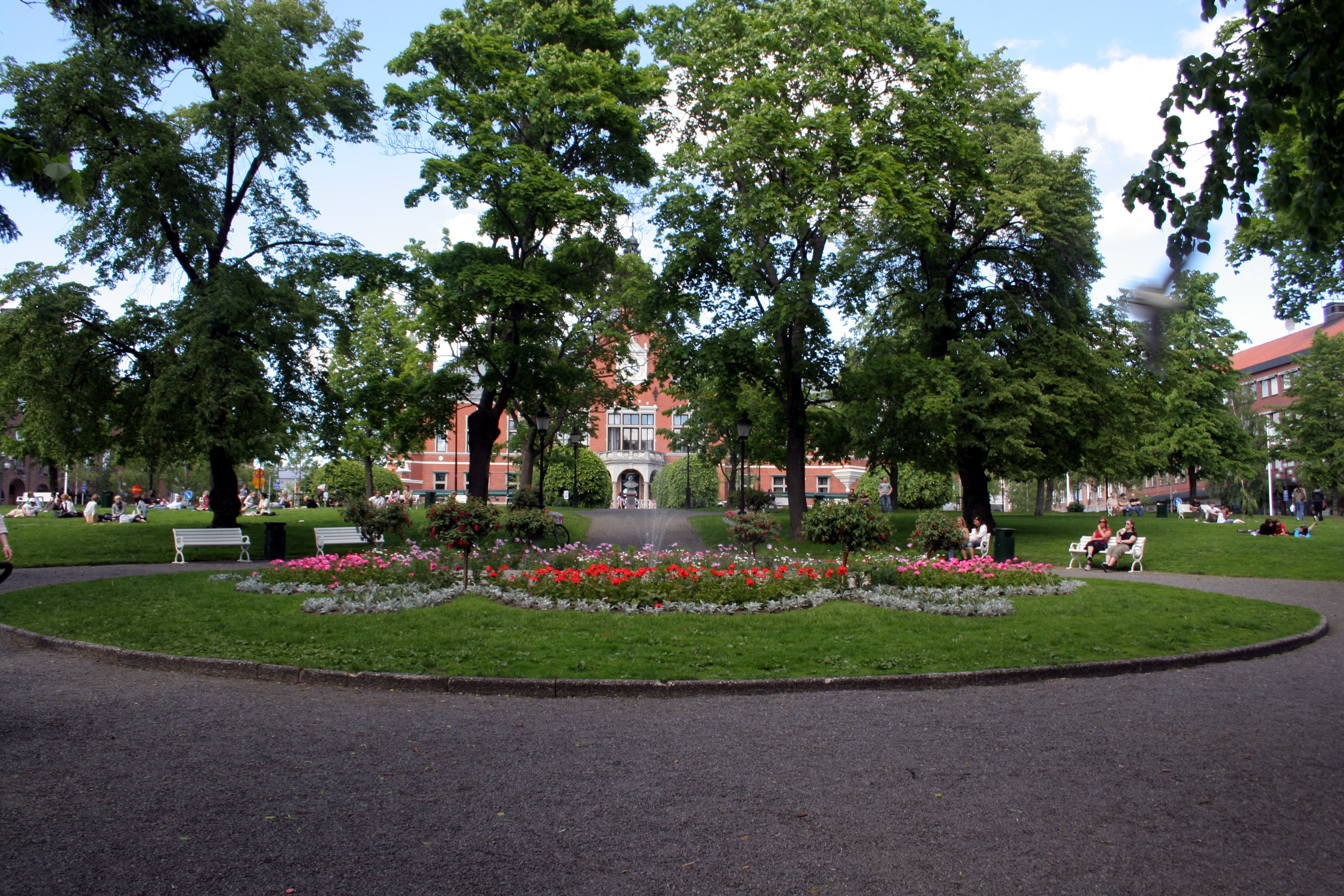
Rådhusparken.

Umeå Town Hall (Swedish: Umeå rådhus) was built after the fire in 1888 that burnt the city to the ground. It was erected on the site where the previous town hall (built in the 17th century) had been located and was completed in 1890. The architect was Fredrik Olaus Lindström from Stockholm. In the new urban area development plan Lindström gave the town hall a prominent location next to the river bank, with the main facade facing south over the harbour on the Ume River (which was still navigable at the time, providing the city's main point of access).

== History ==
=== First town hall ===
During the 17th century, Umeå only had a few public buildings; the church, the school and the town hall. The town hall was on the north of the Rådhustorget (the Town Hall Square), and housed the judiciary, the city administration and other common functions. The town hall was a single-storey building, equipped with three windows facing the square and with a high hipped gable roof topped with a roof lantern.

=== Second town hall ===
During the Great Northern War the town was completely burned down by the Russians several times, but after the peace in 1721 a new town hall was built at the north end of the Town Hall Square. The new town hall consisted of two floors with two wings and a small tower with a clock and striking clock. In the ground floor the city cellar was located, that is a tavern or restaurant, and a debtor's prison. Upstairs there was a ballroom and a smaller hall for meetings. The west wing had two rooms which served as teaching facilities.

=== Third town hall ===
A new and larger town hall with two floors was built in 1814 on the block north of the Town Hall Square with the main facade facing south. The building was designed by Samuel Enander who was an architect at the Överintendentsämbetet (Superintendent Board). In accordance with the Royal Building Regulation which came into force in 1776, public buildings had to be built in stone but Umeå was granted dispensation and the town hall was instead built of timber.

The ground floor included the city cellar, auction rooms, and the remand prison. The upper floor's eastern half had a large hall and room for refreshments, conversation rooms and an atrium. The western half of the upper floor was the session hall of the Magistrate and a common room for city elders.

The height of the rooms on the upper floor was higher than the rooms on the ground floor and the building's facade, which had a strict and smooth Empire style, had a richer range upstairs.

==== New design ====
Umeå had an economic boom around the mid-19th century and the public buildings received much needed renovation. The town hall was fitted with white painted panelling and the facade had six Dorian colossal pilasters. In 1880 a telegraph station was moved to the town hall.

=== Current Town Hall ===
Fredrik Olaus Lindström – whom in 1889-90 created the blueprints for Umeå City Church - was also commissioned to design the new town hall. Lindström was inspired by the Dutch Renaissance style, which allowed a certain asymmetry. The many towers were designed with a widely varying height and shape. Otherwise, the façade is taut and built with red bricks. The portals, the areas surrounding the windows and other details are using light sandstone. For economical reasons some parts, however, use cheaper materials such as cast iron coated with oil paint in matching color.

Great emphasis was placed on the surroundings of the town hall beside the river. Among other things a new esplanade from the town hall towards the north was created. A park was built to give the town hall a monumental position. In the garden is a bust to Gustav Rosén who was on the town council and rose to be the Governor of the county.

==== Dual main entrances ====
When the construction of the Main Line Through Upper Norrland reached Umeå in the middle of 1890 an unexpected problem occurred. It had been decided that the new railway station would be located a bit north of the town hall - i.e. on the back side of the town hall. But it was not considered possible to have the town hall's backside towards the king when he would come by train to inaugurate the railway. Hence, in good time before king Oscar II's arrival in 1896 a second main entrance was built facing north - toward what is now Rådhustorget (the town hall square) and the town hall had dual main entrances.

==== The niche on the town hall's western gable ====
On July 2, 1892 Viktor Rydberg and Georg von Rosen wrote a letter of recommendation to Umeå City Council for the sculptor Oscar Berg. Berg was interested in creating the statue of goddess of justice, Justitia. the statue was included on the drawings high up on the western gable, above the entrance to the old police station, which is now walled up. Because of the major costs for the city with the reconstruction after the fire in 1888 the city council decided that it could not afford it. A motion in 1895 to allow Helmer Osslund's brother Elis Åslund to create the statue for 500 Crowns was rejected for the same reason. Hence, the niche of the town hall's western gable today stands empty without a statue.

==== A multi-purpose building ====
The town hall housed the assembly room for the City Council and the administrative premises. The western part of the building was initially reserved for the judicial and executive systems; with a police station and arrests on the main floor and the courtroom upstairs. Later the entire western part of the building was used by Umeå District Court. For several years the ground floor housed a telegraph station and a post office and the basement was occupied by auction rooms.

== Gustavus II Adolfs bust ==
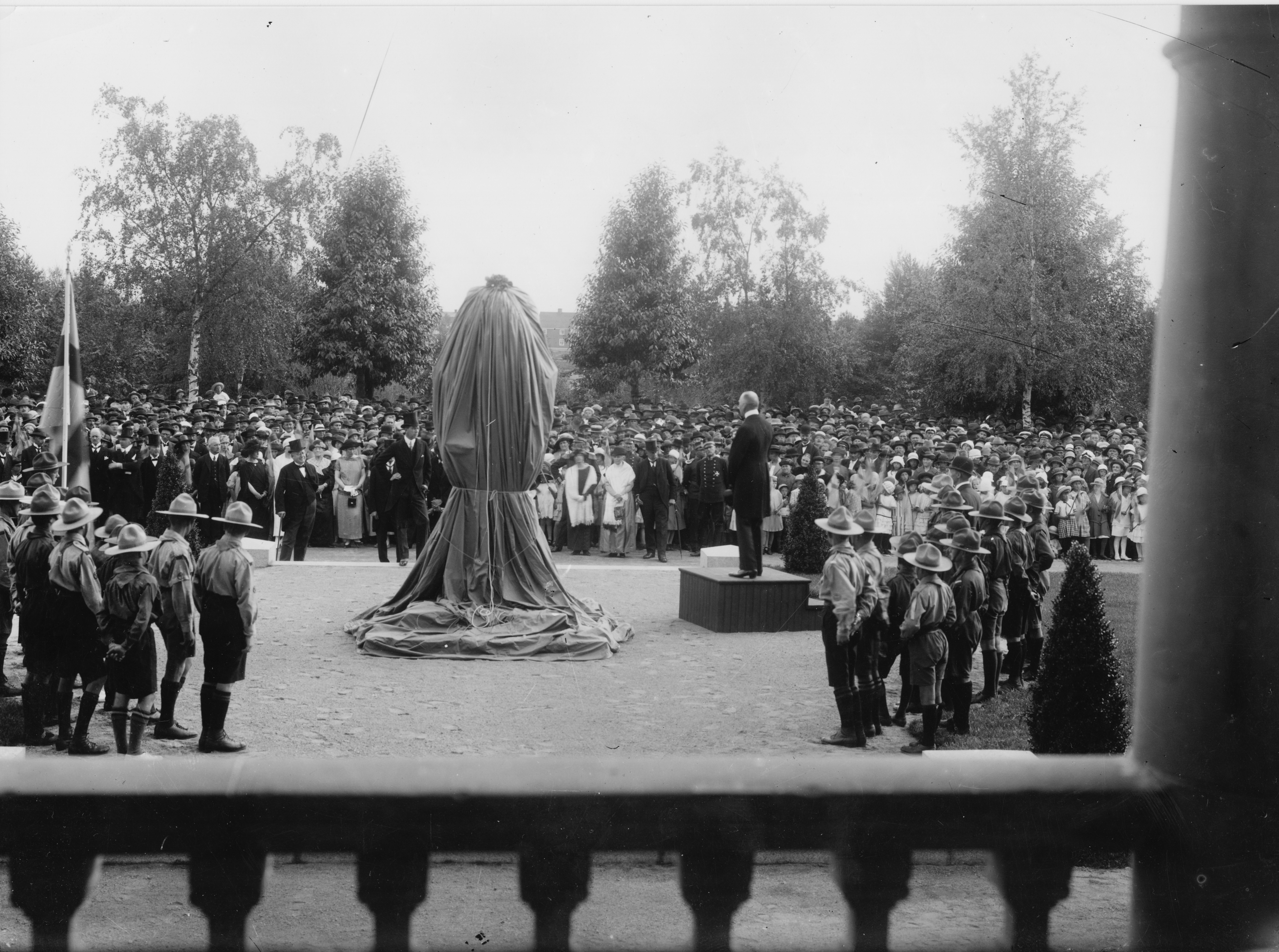
Gustav II Adolf bust was unveiled by crown prince Gustaf Adolf.

A bust of Umeå's founder, Gustav II Adolf, is located midway between Storgatan (the Main Street) and the double stairs on the town hall's south side (towards the river). The bust is made of bronze and stands on a granite plinth. The plinth has a medallion with the monogram GARS (Gustavus Adolphus Rex Sueciae). The overall height is about three meters, and the bust was created by the artist Otto Strandman. The statue was unveiled in a festive ceremony on August 20, 1924 in connection with the 300th anniversary of Västerbotten Regiment.
