= Kyrkbron, Umeå =

Bridge in Umeå, Sweden

Kyrkbron
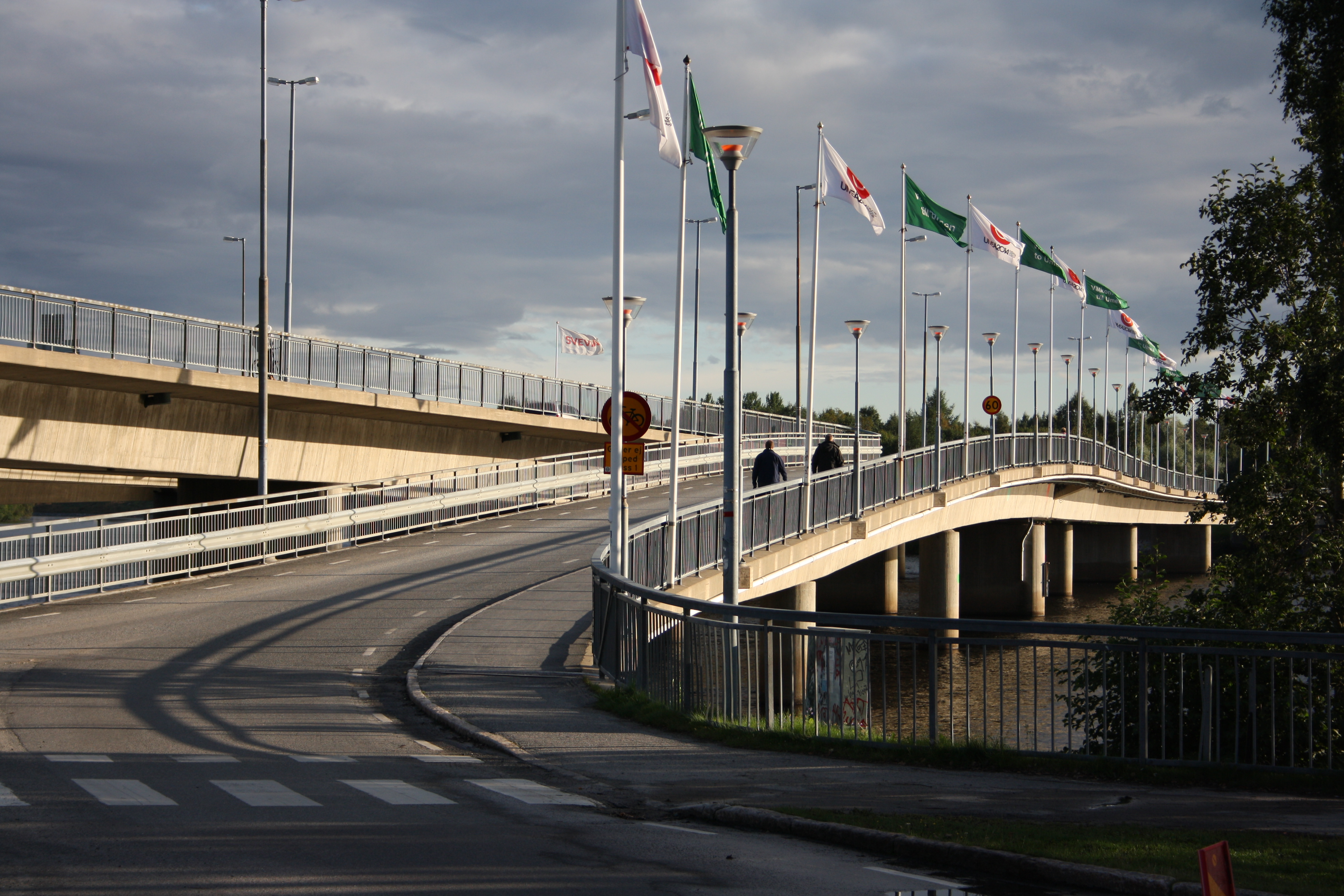
- North side's entrance ramp.
- Coordinates: 63°49′15″N 20°16′0″E
- Carries: Vehicles, pedestrians and bikes
- Crosses: Ume River
- Locale: Umeå
- Maintained by: Umeå Municipality
- ID number: AC 1342

Characteristics
- Material: Reinforced concrete
- Total length: 391 meters
- Width: West bridge: 11–19 m East bridge: 13–20 m
- No. of spans: 11
- Clearance below: 3.8 meters

History
- Constructed by: AB Vägförbättringar
- Construction start: 16 June 1972
- Construction end: 26 September 1975

Statistics
- Daily traffic: 13 300 vehicles and 1 900 bikes

Kyrkbron is a bridge in Umeå that takes Östra Kyrkogatan over Ume River to Teg on the south side. The construction of Kyrkbron started in 1973 and it was opened on 26 September 1975 becoming Umeå's third bridge over the Ume river. A discussion about whether or not the bridge should be located next to the church lasted from the early 1960s and continued into the 1970s. During the construction an unknown burial ground was encountered (an older part of the cemetery), leading to archaeological excavations.

The bridge consists of two parallel girders in concrete with vertical straight supports. It is actually two separate bridges, each with their lane with on and exit ramps that extend out over the river on the north side. The purpose of building Kyrkbron was to relieve Tegsbron from some of the traffic and Kyrkbron was designed with the expectation that there would be a drastic increase in car traffic in the city center, which proved to be highly optimistic.

== History ==
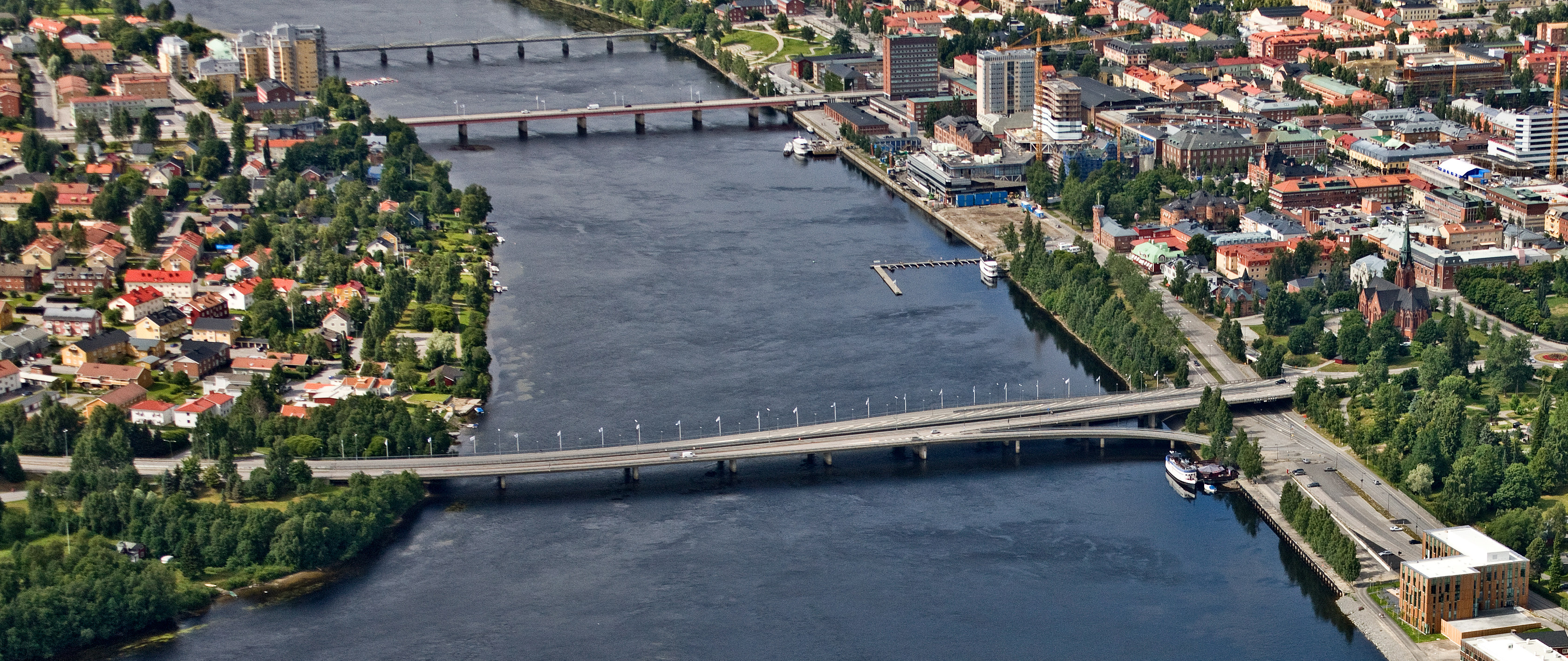
Aerial photo of Ume river in central Umeå. The nearest bridge is the Kyrkbron.

=== Background ===
Already in the 1930s it was clear that the only bridge over the river in Umeå, Gamla bron, no longer would be able to cope with the increasing traffic. The County Board in Västerbotten commissioned the highway engineer O H Grahnén to create a work plan and drawings for a new bridge or a reconstruction of the existing bridge. Grahnén's proposal, dated 16 July 1936, showed a number of different solutions. Among other suggestions, there was a proposal to place the bridge as an extension to Östra Kyrkogatan, next to Umeå City Church. One problem with this solution was that the bridge then would end up downstream from the port and therefore the bridge would need to have vertical clearance or have movable bridge components, so that ships could pass. Such solutions was however considered to be too costly. Grahnén's main proposal was instead that the old bridge was closed to motor traffic and that a new bridge was to be built at the extension of Västra Esplanaden.

Tegs municipal society then requested a report regarding the possibility of a bridge in the extension of Östra Kyrkogatan. The provincial government appointed O. H. Grahnén to investigate it and Grahnén's investigation showed that a swing bridge with a swing span was the only realistic solution, but also that the additional costs were considered too high. This led Grahnén to object to building a bridge at Östra kyrkogatan. Despite Grahnén's advise the provincial government in 1939 decided that a swing bridge should be built. The case was revised by the King in Council who sent the matter back to the provincial government for reconsideration. This led the provincial government to change their minds and it was decided that the bridge should be built at the extension of Västra Esplanaden. This bridge, Tegsbron, was inaugurated in 1949.

=== Investigations, plans and decisions ===
A map from 2013, with the 1965 eastern alternatives drawn on it. Orrje & Co east bridge alternative Åke Lundberg's suggestions on traffic connection via the island Ön Common new routing of the traffic

Tegs municipal society in 1960 merged with Umeå landskommun (Umeå rural municipality) and there was a need to create a zoning plan for central Teg. A few years later in 1965, when Umeå landskommun was to merge with Umeå city, there was a need for a land use plan for the entire urban area. In the land use plan an area was allocated for a bridge at the church and a highway from Tegsbron through central Teg. A strong minority in the Municipal council was against Kyrkbron and the highway, as they wanted to keep Teg as a unit.

The land use plan, with the bridge situated next to the church, was created by Västerbottenskommunernas Arkitekt- och Byggnadskontor (VAB), with Åke Lundberg as the chief architect. The proposal was sent out to submission for comment to, among other things, the parish council in Umeå city parish, which endorsed the bridge's placement next to the church.

The engineering company Orrje & Co was hired in 1963 to develop a plan for Umeå's traffic route. Also the municipality's Public Works Department did an investigation of the bridge's position.

In October 1964, Orrje & Co presented a plan for the traffic route that took into consideration what traffic capacity the bridge would need to have in 1980, which was estimated at more than 40,000 cars per day. The plan also stated that the bridge should be located at the church in the extension of Östra Kyrkogatan.

In February 1965 the city council adopted Orrje & Co's proposals on the plan for the traffic route. The same year the parish council requested a new examination of the placement of the bridge as the church services would be disturbed by traffic noise and that the fragile environment around the church would be destroyed if the bridge was built there. The parish council's objections were addressed in a motion to the city council. The city council commissioned Orrje & Co to do a study of an additional placement for the bridge.

In November 1965 Orrje & Co presented two proposals: the original one with the bridge at the church and one with the bridge placed more to the east in the extension of Järnvägsgatan. The placement next to the church was considered most appropriate. However, Åke Lundberg, who became the county architect in 1964, suggested that Orrje & Co's eastern alternative should be used as he argued that the technical and economic advantages of the placement next to the church did not outweigh the infringing of the aesthetic and historical values.

In April and May 1966 two studies were presented in print, Orrje & Co's: "Ny bro över Ume älv: två principförslag" and the architect Erik Thelaus' "Bro över Umeälven. Synpunkter på miljöfrågor m m".

The architect firm Klemming och Thelaus was awarded a contract from Umeå city to study the environmental impacts of a bridge placed next to the church, and to propose a design of the bridge and its abutment. The findings were, amongst other things, reported with a model in scale 1:400, with floor plans and a memorandum. The memorandum emphasized that the bridge should be parallel to Tegsbron, to fit into the orthogonal and regular structure of the land use in the city. It was also concluded that it was important that the bridge would be given a visual connection or relationship with Tegsbron. Therefore, the firm proposed a bridge with a straight box girder with straight vertical support.

In June 1966 the motion for a new examination of the placement of the bridge was discussed in the city council. Drätselkammaren, responsible for the city's economy, agreed with the Public Works Department's line, and argued that the placement next to the church took precedence over other options. The city council approved drätselkammaren's proposal without a vote.

In August 1966, Orrje & Co's report "Förslag till ny bro över Ume älv i sträckning Idrottsvägen-Östra Kyrkogatan" ("Proposal for a new bridge over the Ume River in the direction Idrottsvägen-Östra Kyrkogatan") that showed the traffic engineering principles that should form the basis of Kyrkbron. It was meant to serve as a basis for land use plans for parts of the city. The land use plan was revised according to Orrje & Co's report, and the projection of the bridge was done in collaboration with the Swedish Road Administration. Different stakeholders were called in, including the Log driving association whose views on the span's design was important, so that log driving would not be affected. After a suggestion from the roadworks department the bicycle lane was placed in between the bridge's two driving lanes.

The new town plan was adopted by the city council in 1968. The County Administrative Board objected to the city's land use plan in 1969 and wanted an investigation into a more eastern location for the bridge. The reason given was that the expansions of Umeå University and Norrland's University Hospital changed the conditions, as both lies east of downtown Umeå. Also the Swedish National Heritage Board appealed based on infringement of inalienable values.

The King in Council referred the matter to the Statens planverk (the national planning department) which, in turn, requested the opinion of the Swedish Road Administration, which finally endorsed the plan. The reasoning was that the goal with new bridge would be to reduce traffic on Tegsbron, hence, the new bridge could not be too far away from Tegsbron. The land use plan was finally approved in September 1969. Two months later Kyrkbron was added to Swedish Road Administration's budget for 1970–74. Building started in 1972.

It was calculated that Kyrkbron would take 54.5 percent of the traffic from Tegsbron. At the time Tegsbron had around 25,000 vehicles/day, which was the maximum capacity for the bridge. The prognosis for year 1990 was 60,000 vehicles per day.

At the city council's handling of the annual budget, on 28 October 1971, the municipal government proposed that the plan for "bro över Ume älv" ("bridge over Ume River") should be adopted. This was followed by a heated debate that lasted six hours before the city council decided to allocate funding for the bridge. The number of votes was 25 against to 26 in favor, where the president had the casting vote. Thus the bridge's position at the church was settled. The decision to build the bridge led to the provincial government received 43 complaints letters against the decision. In May 1972 an agreement was signed between Umeå Municipality and the Swedish Road Administration that the Swedish Road Administration would build the bridge starting on 16 June 1972. AB Vägförbättringar was commissioned to build the bridge for 18.6 million kronor. This also included other works related to the bridge.

=== The opposition against Kyrkbron ===
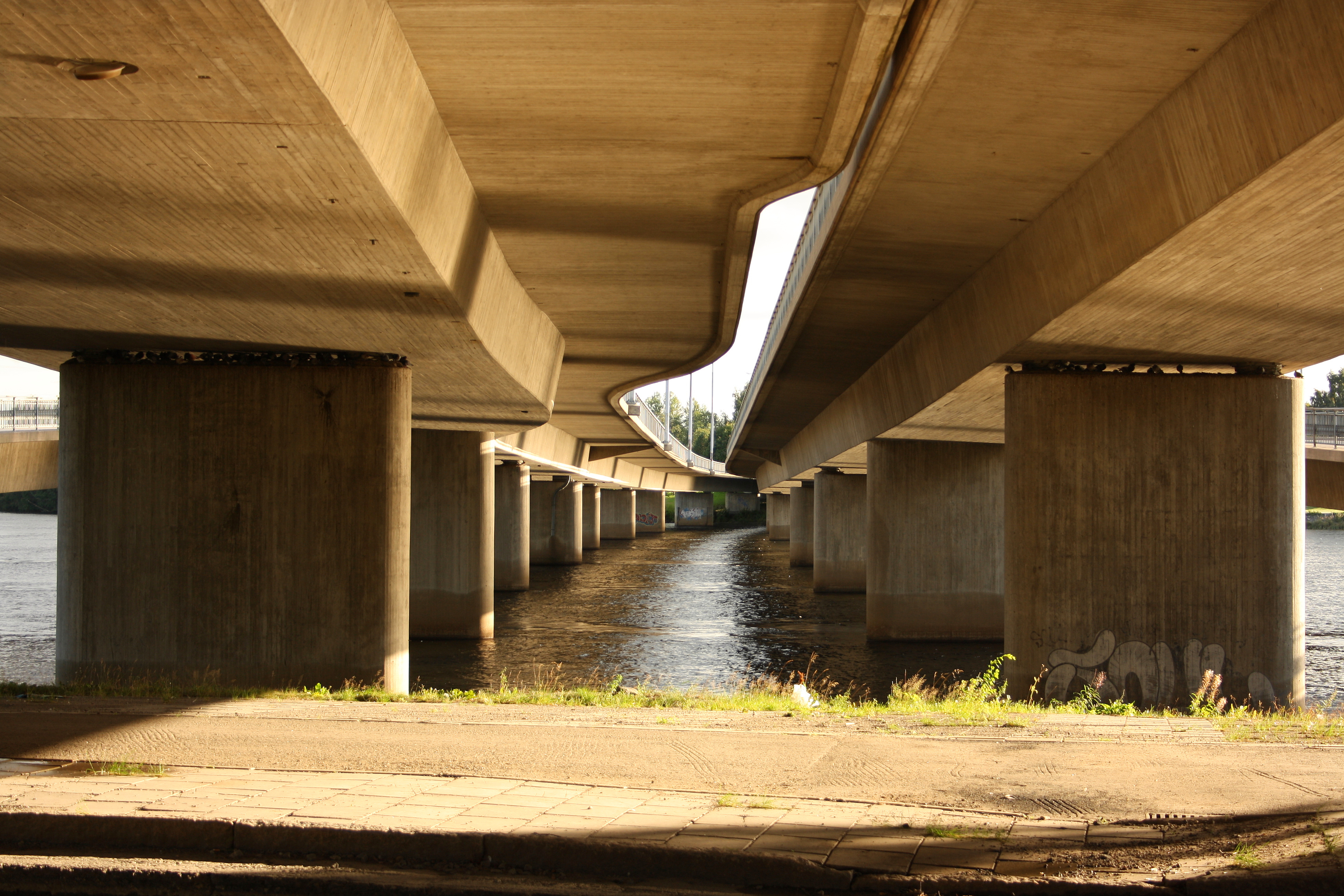
Kyrkbron from underneath. The east bridge to the left and the west bridge to the right.

The debate on the bridge started in 1965 when the church council sent a letter to the city council stating that the church services would be disrupted by the traffic on the bridge. In June 1971 the county architect Åke Lundberg once again brought up the placement of the bridge during an information session on municipal issues in Holmsund.

In the local media the discussion continued and various experts at the national level commented about the bridge. On 2 October 1971 the peak of the resistance was reached when a demonstration against the bridge was held in Umeå. The demonstration was initiated because a reader poll in the newspaper Västerbottens-Kuriren the previous day had shown that 84 percent were against the construction of Kyrkbron. Also the newly appointed governor Karl Georg Samuelson became involved in the opposition towards Kyrkbron.

A few members of the Centre Party tried to stop the construction in 1973, on the grounds that the cost had risen to 45 million kronor. The motion was rejected on the ground that it would be more costly for the municipality to rework the city's land use plan and cancel existing contracts than to continue the construction. Also, there would be implications of reduced employment in the municipality if the construction did not take place as planned. The opposition towards Kyrkbron was from then on reduced.

=== An unknown graveyard and cannon balls ===
During the summer of 1972 an unknown graveyard was found when workers were digging for the bridge next to Umeå City Church. The old boundaries of the cemetery was unknown and a tomb map was missing. The discovery made the county custodian of antiquities Sune Zachrisson and the Swedish National Heritage Board to put the construction of the bridge to a halt as the area would undergo archaeological excavations. Under the leadership of Sibylla Haasum 22 shafts were dug between 1 July and 17 August.

The result was forty casket graves with about sixty skeletons and also remains of coffins, coffin handles, fittings, nails, ornaments, grave plates, etc. were found. In an excavation seventeen cannonballs were found. The cannonballs probably came from the Finnish War of 1808–1809. Either the cannonballs ended up there when Lieutenant General Johan Adam Cronstedt defended Umeå in March 1809 or when the Russian general Nikolai Kamensky in the summer of 1809 defended the bridge that the Russians built across Ume River. In the last grave, a 3.3 by 3.8-meter large tomb south-southeast of the church, legible name plates were found that showed that it was governor Pehr Adam Stromberg's family grave. No headstone was found but it was probably destroyed when the church burned in 1887, along with all archival material about the graves.

=== The construction of the bridge and the inauguration ===
During the construction of the bridge a few technical novelties were used such as a desktop computer when surveying and the distance was measured with a laser. Kyrkbron was inaugurated 26 September 1975 by the Swedish Communication Minister Bengt Norling. In connection with the construction of the bridge an extensive rerouting of the traffic in central Umeå and Teg was also carried out. Teg became the first district in Umeå to get a pedestrian and cycle path all the way downtown.

=== After the construction of the bridge ===
When the construction of Kolbäcksbron began in 1998, Kyrkbron had approximately 16,600 and Tegsbron approximately 21,600 vehicles per mean annual day. In 2010 Kyrkbron had about 15,100, Tegsbron about 27,300 and Kolbäcksbron about 12,000 vehicles per mean annual day.

Because of Kolbäcksbron, a reduced amount of traffic in the center and the transformation of Strandgatan from a transit route to a city street. Kyrkbron's importance have been reduced and the bridge is now over-dimensioned.
