= Fredrik Lindström =

Fredrik Lindström may refer to:

- Fredrik Lindström (writer) (born 1963), Swedish linguist, comedian, film director and presenter
- Fredrik Lindström (biathlete) (born 1989), Swedish biathlete
- Fredrik Olaus Lindström (1847–1919), Swedish architect
