= Umeå Old Prison =

Prison in Sweden

The Old Prison in Umeå
- Umeå gamla fängelse
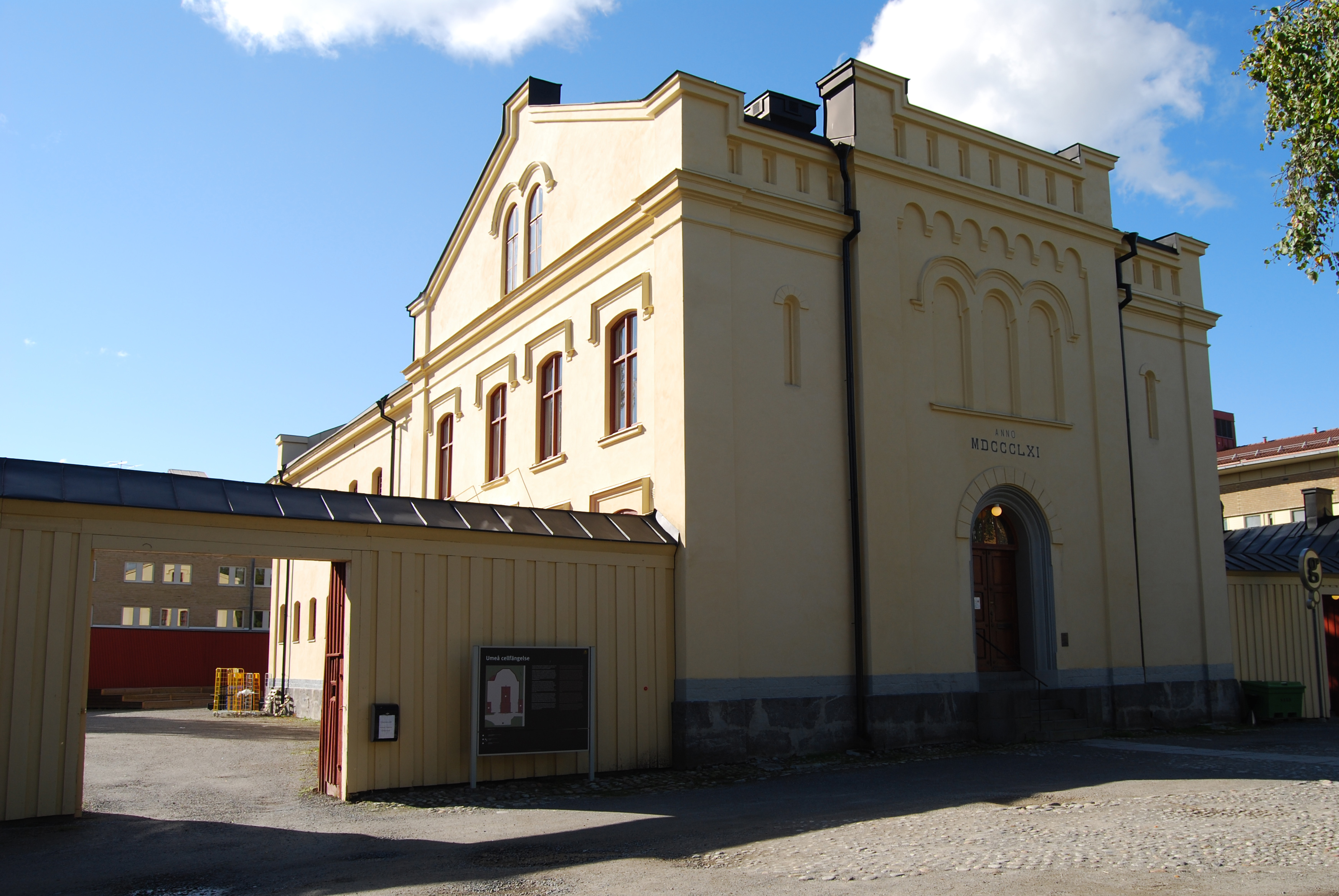
- The Old Prison in Umeå, seen from Storgatan.
- Interactive map of the The Old Prison in Umeå area
- Former names: Cellfängelset
- Alternative names: Länscellfängelset

General information
- Status: Completed
- Type: Prison
- Location: Storgatan 62, Umeå, Sweden
- Coordinates: 63°49′20.4″N 20°16′31.4″E
- Construction started: 1859
- Completed: 1862
- Owner: National Property Board of Sweden

Design and construction
- Architect: Theodor Anckarsvärd

The Umeå Old Prison (Swedish: Umeå gamla fängelse or länscellfängelset) is a former prison and hotel in Umeå. The building was completed in 1861. The prison was one of few buildings that did not burn down at the city fire of 1888. Thus, it is one of Umeå's oldest remaining buildings and is listed building since 1992. The prison housed inmates until 1981 and during the 1980s and 1990s theater plays were organized there. In 2007–2008, the prison was rebuilt into a hotel.

== History ==
Umeå old prison was one of some 20 provincial prisons designed by Wilhelm Theodor Anckarsvärd, who was the architect of National Swedish Prisons Board during the years 1855–1877.

These prisons were built with the American Philadelphia system as a model, which amongst other things meant that common cells were replaced by individual cells where prisoners would be able to contemplate their fate. The prison housed a total of 24 cells on two floors which were located along the exterior walls so that everyone got daylight. The prison building also housed offices and residential spaces. The building was one of the few that survived the great fire of 1888. Also the southern wooden palisade survived the fire which give contemporary visitors an idea of the shape of the prison's exercise yard.

The then-editor in chief of the local newspaper Västerbottens-Kuriren, Gustav Rosén (1876–1942), spent three months in prison in 1916. He was convicted of defamation of the city's Stadsfiskal (the city's highest police official). This was the culmination of the so-called Umeå fights (Umeåbråken), which attracted nationwide attention.

The prison is now Umeå's oldest surviving stone building and is one of the best preserved prisons in the country. It was in use until 1981 when Umeå prison was completed. The prison is owned by the National Property Board of Sweden (SFV) and became a national monument in 1992.

== Theater ==
From 1987 and during most of the 1990s, the building and the exercise yard was used by an amateur theater group, Grotteatern, and the independent theater group Profilteatern. To the centenary of the devastating fire of 1888 Grotteatern in 1988 created a theater production called The Game of the Great Fire (Spelet om den stora branden) (by Frank Kelber) on the old prison's exercise yard. Both Grotteatern and Profilteatern put up shows during the summers on the exercise yard for a number of years after that.

== Hotel ==
In 2007–2008, the building was converted into a hotel with 23 single rooms, 2 family rooms and one double room with a conference room for meetings and celebrations that can accommodate up to 50 people. It offers made beds with communal showers and toilets, and socializing areas. In the annex on the yard is the german styled brasserie "Zillers".

== Gallery ==
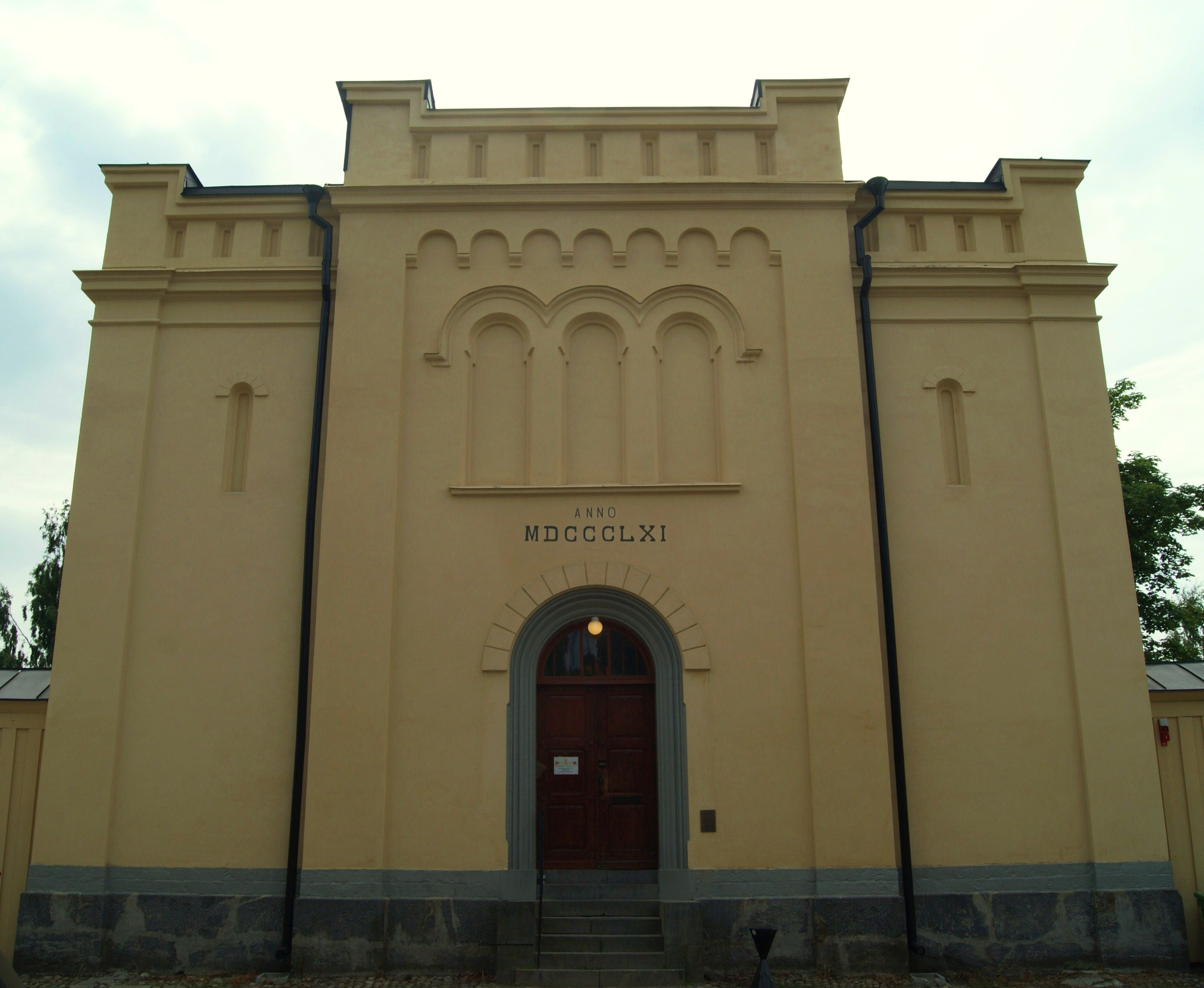
The picture shows the prison's main building viewed from the front of the main entrance towards Storgatan.

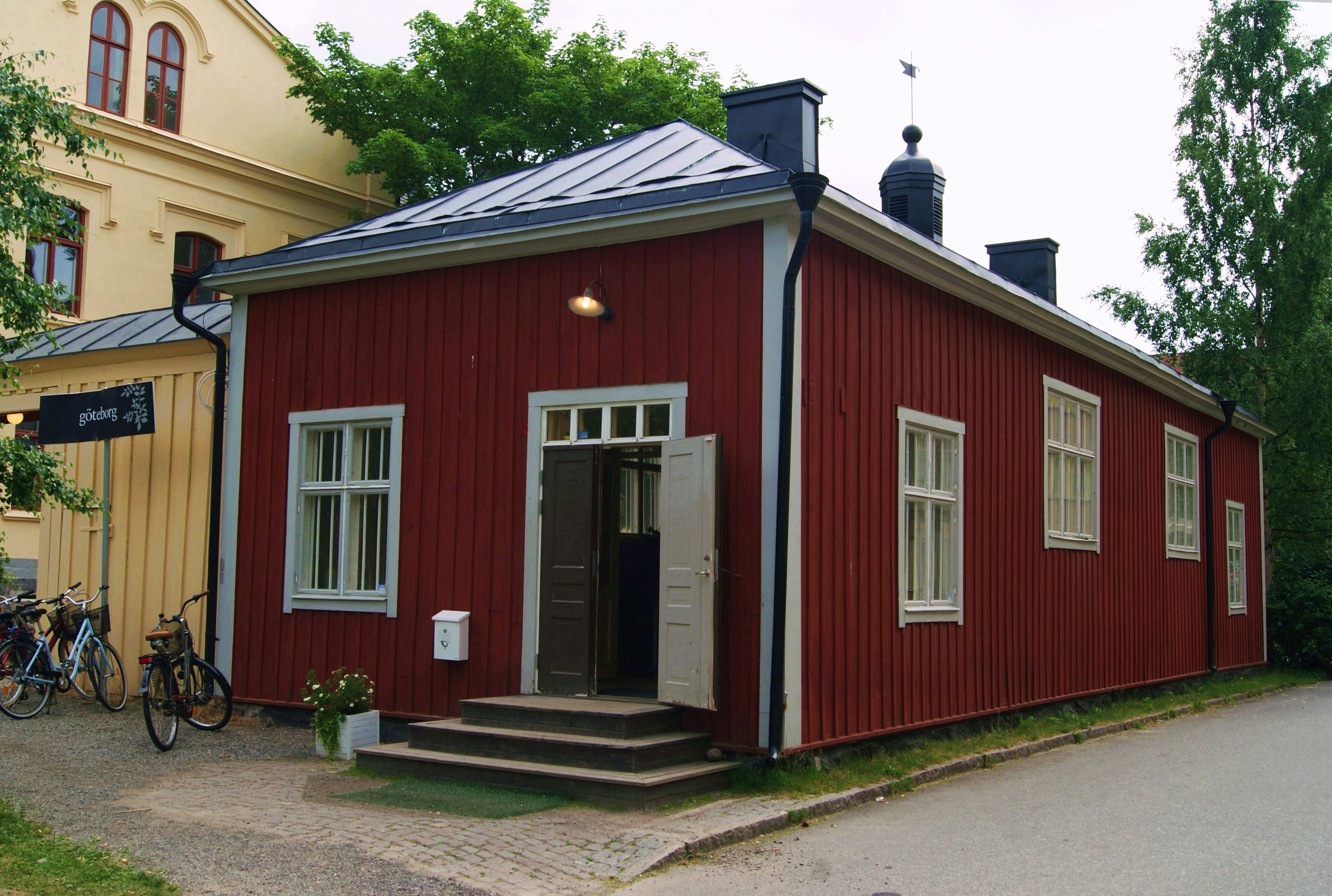
The old courtroom now houses Ziller's brasserie.

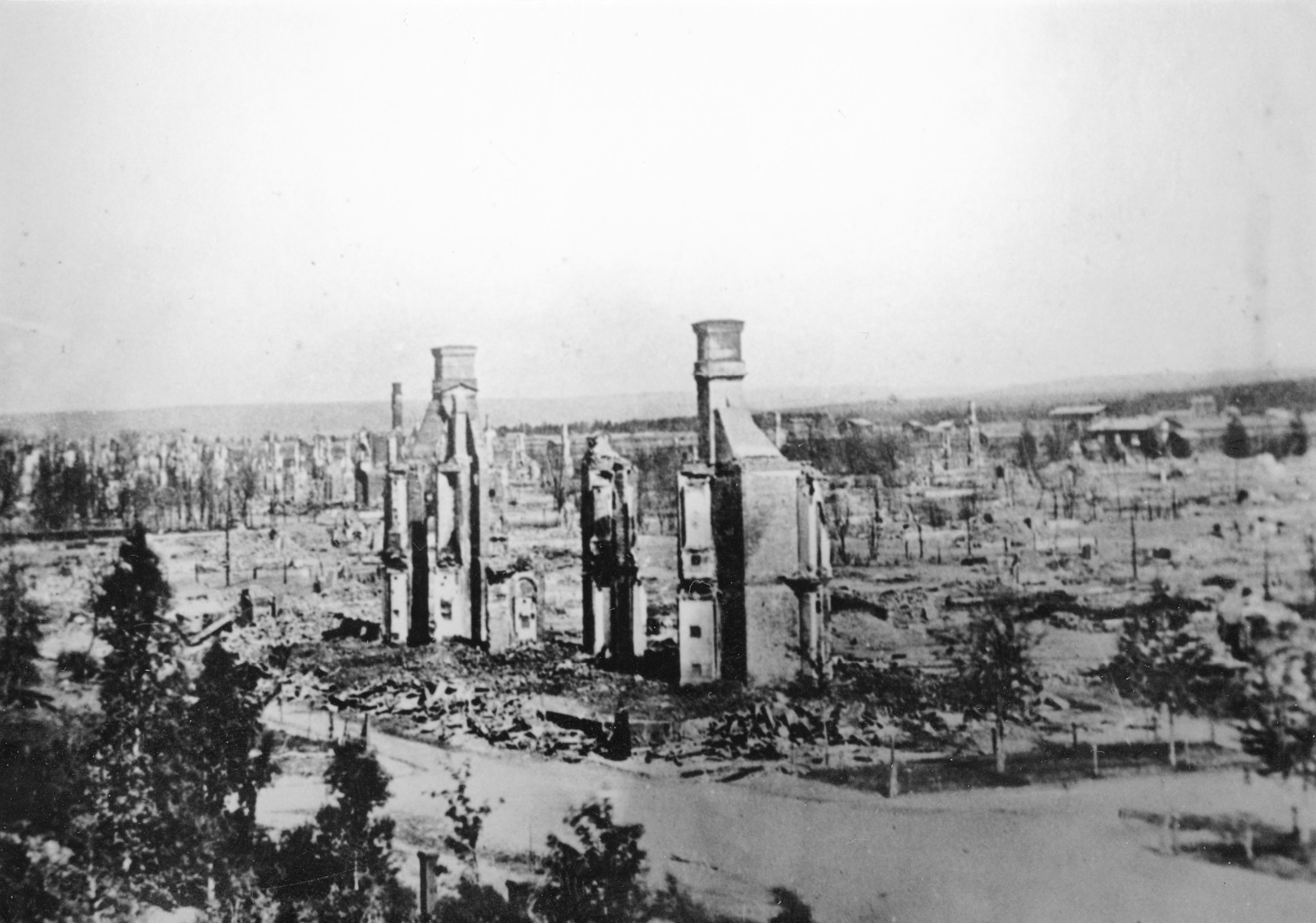
Photo from the prison's roof towards the northwest after the devastating fire of 1888.

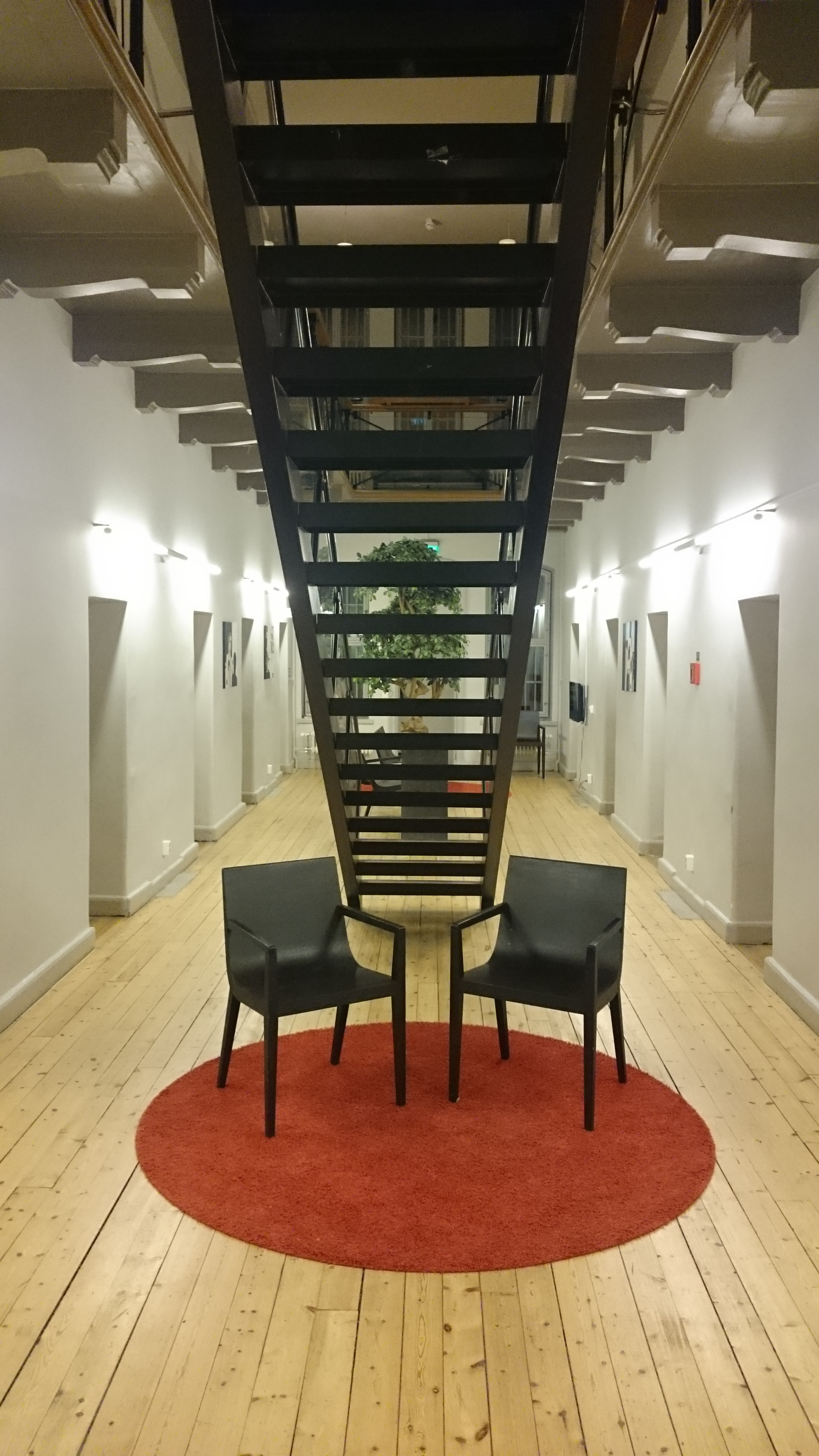
Interior of Umeå Old Prison, with two levels of cells.
