= Teg, Umeå =

Teg
- Residential area
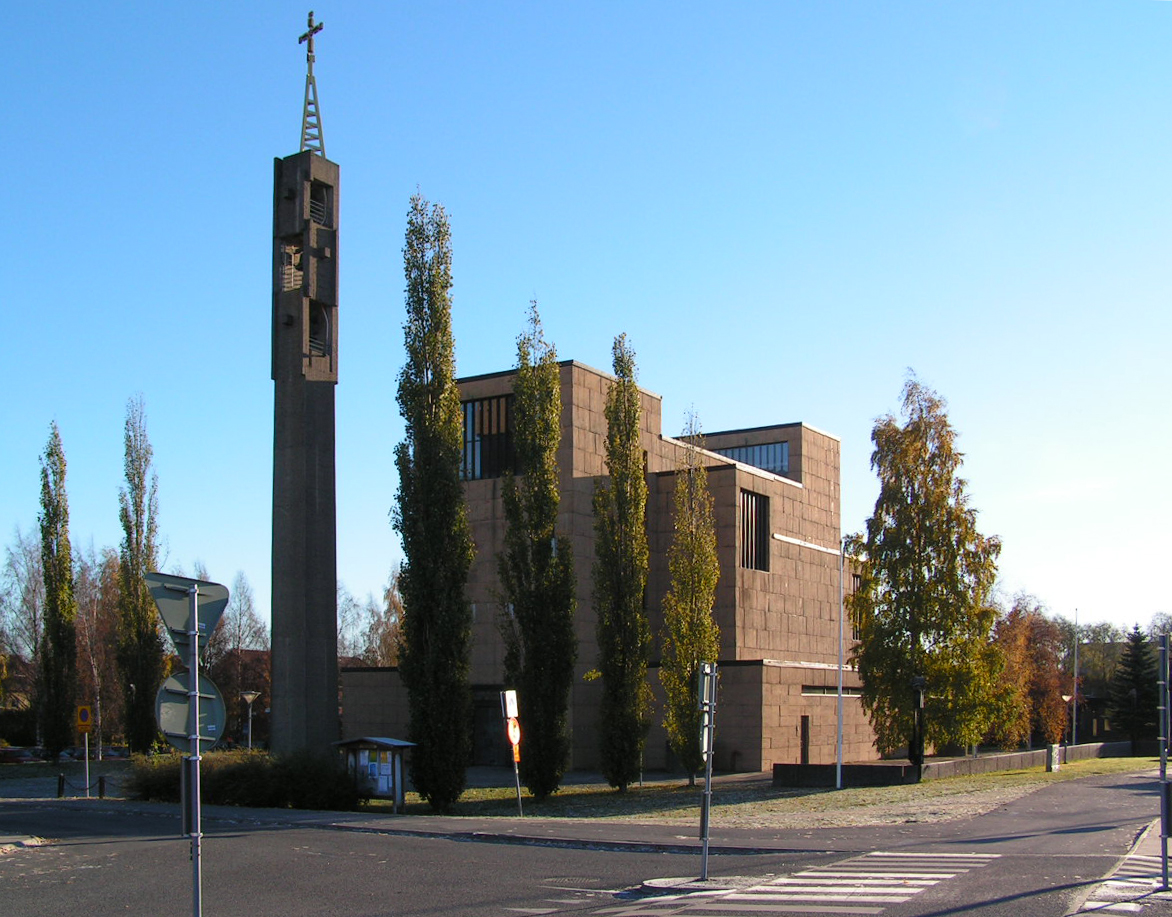
- Teg Church in October 2006
- Interactive map of Teg
- Coordinates: 63°49′02″N 20°14′51″E
- Country: Sweden
- Province: Västerbotten
- County: Västerbotten County
- Municipality: Umeå Municipality
- Time zone: UTC+1 (CET)
  - Summer (DST): UTC+2 (CEST)

Teg is a residential area in Umeå, Sweden. Teg is connected to Umeå center through two bridges, Tegsbron and Kyrkbron.
