= Gustav Rosén =

Swedish newspaper owner, journalist and politician (1876–1942)

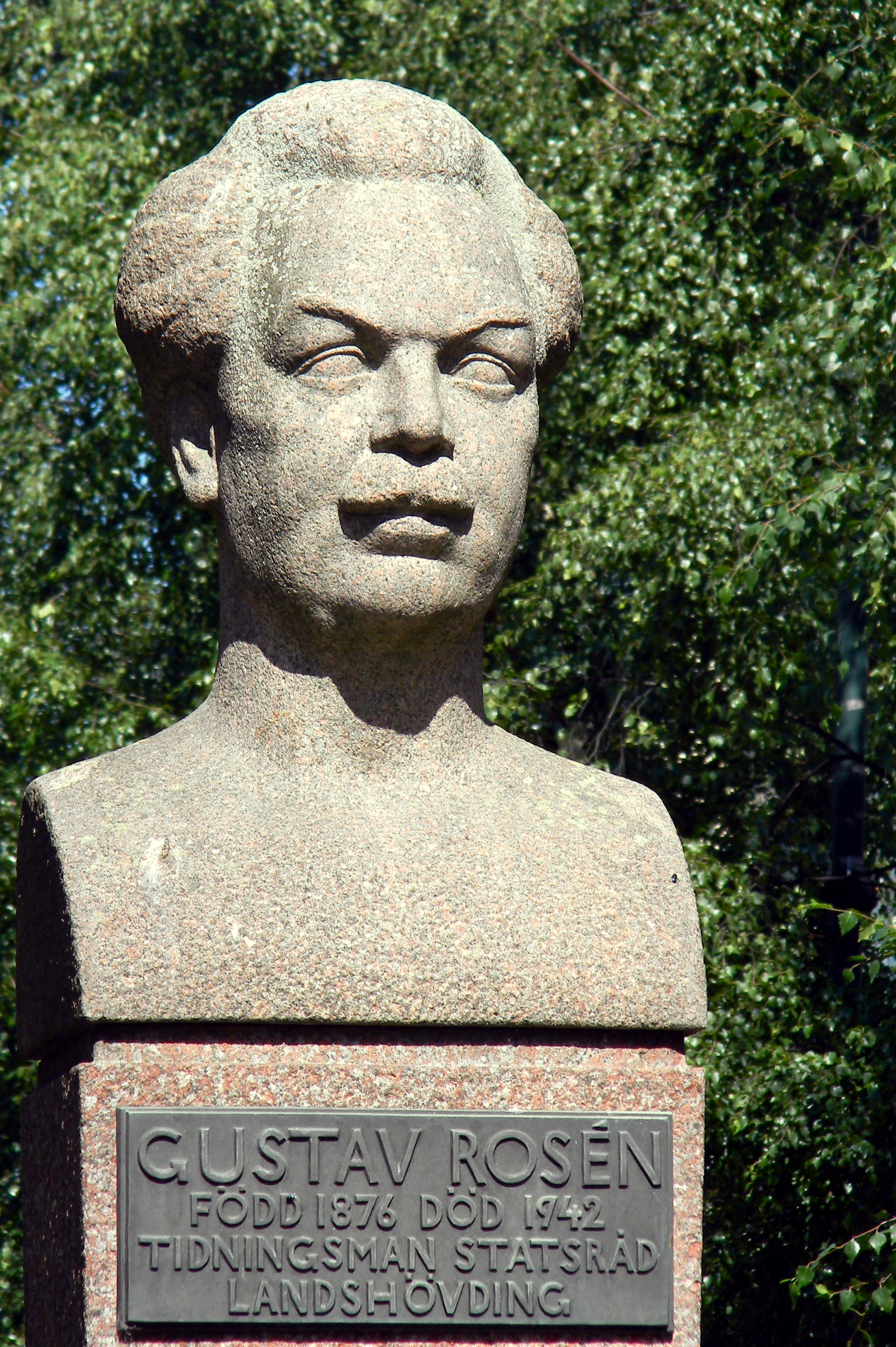
- bust by Wilhelm Gieseke
- Born: 2 April 1876; Vallsjö, Sweden
- Died: 10 December 1942 (aged 66); Umeå, Sweden
- Known for: Politician, Minister of Defence and County Governor
- Political party: Liberal Party

Gustav Rosén (2 April 1876 – 10 December 1942) was a Swedish newspaper owner, journalist, and politician. He went to jail and he was Minister of Defence and the Governor of Västerbotten County. He is known for children's day in Umeå, beech lined country roads and temperance.

== Life ==
Rosén was born in Vallsjö in 1876. He was the second of eleven children born to Per Gustaf and Christina Ottilia Andersson (born Engdahla), a railway worker and his wife. He left school when his family could no longer finance his education and turned to the military to complete it. He graduated as an officer after three years of training with excellent results, but he quickly left the army. He then worked for a number of years on the northern railway construction of the Ofotenbanan.

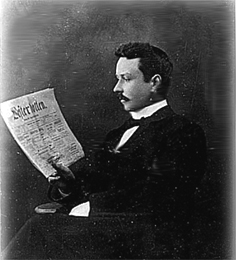
Rosén was a Swedish newspaper owner.

In 1902, he married Tyra Edit Olivia Lindforss from Sävar near Umeå. That same year, he helped to found the Liberal National Association. In 1903, he published a book about his time working on Ofotenbanan criticising the maladministration he had observed. He began working as a journalist at Västerbottens-Kuriren, a newspaper published in Umeå for northern Swedes in Västerbotten County. Under his leadership it rose to be the largest newspaper in the county. He championed the rights of all classes with his liberal attitude. Rosen came to own the newspaper after thwarting a plot designed to transfer the ownership to his right wing opponents.

Rosen had successfully championed a Children's Day in Umeå for the local children, and in 1910 he successfully ran to join the town council. He became a member of parliament, where he worked on Defence issues as well as championing the temperance cause. Temperance was a matter of national concern, but Rosén believed that this should be settled at a more local level. He was aware that the tax on alcohol meant that a temperate tax payer may see it as in interest to allow others, who did consume alcohol, to pay the tax bill. In 1922 the national referendum on alcohol was rejected, but because of Rosén alcohol was prohibited in Västerbotten County by an 81% majority.

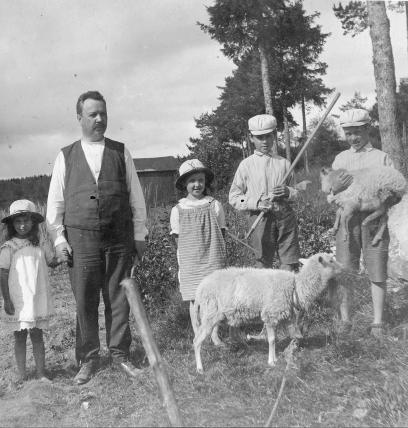
Rosen and his children

His writings were not popular with the establishment and he was taken to court in 1915 for libelling a superintendent. Faced by a jury of three that included his political opponents, he was sentenced to three months in what is now Umeå Old Prison. When he left prison he was met by cheers from the waiting crowd.

Rosén played a role in the Folkpartiet (Liberal People's Party) in Sweden. He was a Minister of Defence in Carl Gustav Ekman government, succeeding Per Albin Hansson in that role on 7 June 1926. He took on a difficult task as his party was committed to disarmament and cutting the budget. This placed him in a difficult position squeezed between the military and his political opponents who noted his difficulties. After his party lost power on 2 October 1928, Gustav Rosén returned to Umeå in 1929.

Rosén was made the Governor of Västerbotten County from 1931 until his death in 1942, in Umeå. As governor he worked for simple roads, and had over 900 routes built to open up the countryside and permit travel. He believed that he needed to improve communication to the thousand villages and farms that lacked any roads. He also encouraged the population to grow more plants, and in his residence in Umea he planted ash, elm and oak to lead by example. Rosen became known for the policy of planting birch trees along the country roads that he authorised. These tree-lined avenues not only kept traffic in the shade, but the trees enabled travelers to find the road when the ground was covered in snow.

Rosén was an ambassador for Norrland and wrote to change the perceptions of his fellow Swedes. To illustrate his message he sent apples to the Swedish government and to the newspapers in Gothenburg, Malmö, and Stockholm. He wanted to change their stereotypical view that it was only grass "up there".

== Legacy ==
His papers were published under the title "Memories" in 1943 and two biographies were written by his son and Kersti Ullenhag. His papers, songs, poems, and thousands of photos are in the county archive. A bust of him was placed in Umeå. His descendants include Nils Gustav Rosén (1907–1993), who was a Director General, Stellan Rosen (1902–1995), who succeeded his father as publisher of his newspaper, Staffan Rosén (1905–1994), a radio and culture editor, and Kjell Rosen (1909–1982), an architect and painter.

Preceded by Nils Gustaf Ringstrand	Governor of Västerbotten County; 1931-1942	Succeeded by Elof Lindberg
