= Gamla bron =

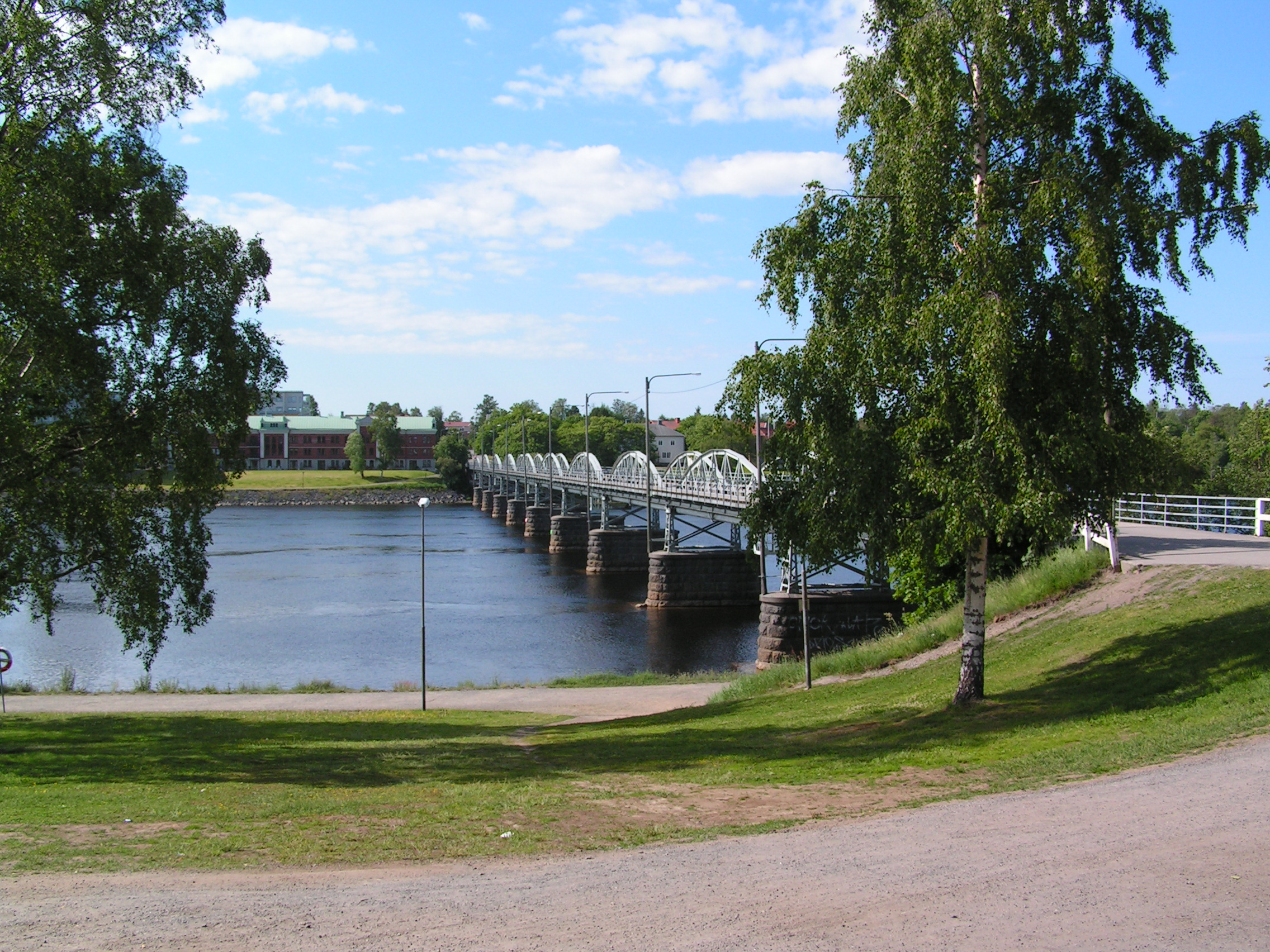
- The old bridge from the north side.
- Coordinates: 63°49′30″N 20°14′57″E
- Carries: pedestrians, bikes
- Crosses: Ume River
- Locale: Umeå, Sweden

Characteristics
- Material: Steel

Location
- Interactive map of Gamla bron

Gamla bron (English: the old bridge) is Umeås oldest remaining bridge over Ume River in Sweden and is 301 metres (988 ft) long.

== History ==
Before Umeå had a bridge the inhabitants crossed the river using ice roads during the winter and with ferries the other seasons.

During the second Russian occupation of Umeå in the Finnish War the Russians in 1809 built a floating bridge of logs across the river. However, soon thereafter it was destroyed by a spring flood.

To build a bridge over the Ume River was long considered to be too costly, but the governor Gustaf Munthe became interested in the issue when he took office in 1856 and 1858. He gave a mandate to investigate where the bridge would be most appropriate, to create proposals on drawings and calculate what it would cost. The investigation indicated that just outside the city, upstream of the river, the river's base was most favorable to carry the bridge. The expected cost of the bridge would be 65,450 kronor. With the attendant cost, the total cost would be 86,000 kronor.

The bridge was opened in 1863 and for a long time travelers had to pay a fee to use the bridge. After only a decade the original woodwork needed to be changed and in 1894-95 it was replaced with steel and the bridge got the appearance it has today.

== The bridge today ==
Today the bridge is only opened for pedestrians and bikers. During 2013 flaws were noticed which called for repairs.
