= Umeå City Church =

- Umeå stads kyrka
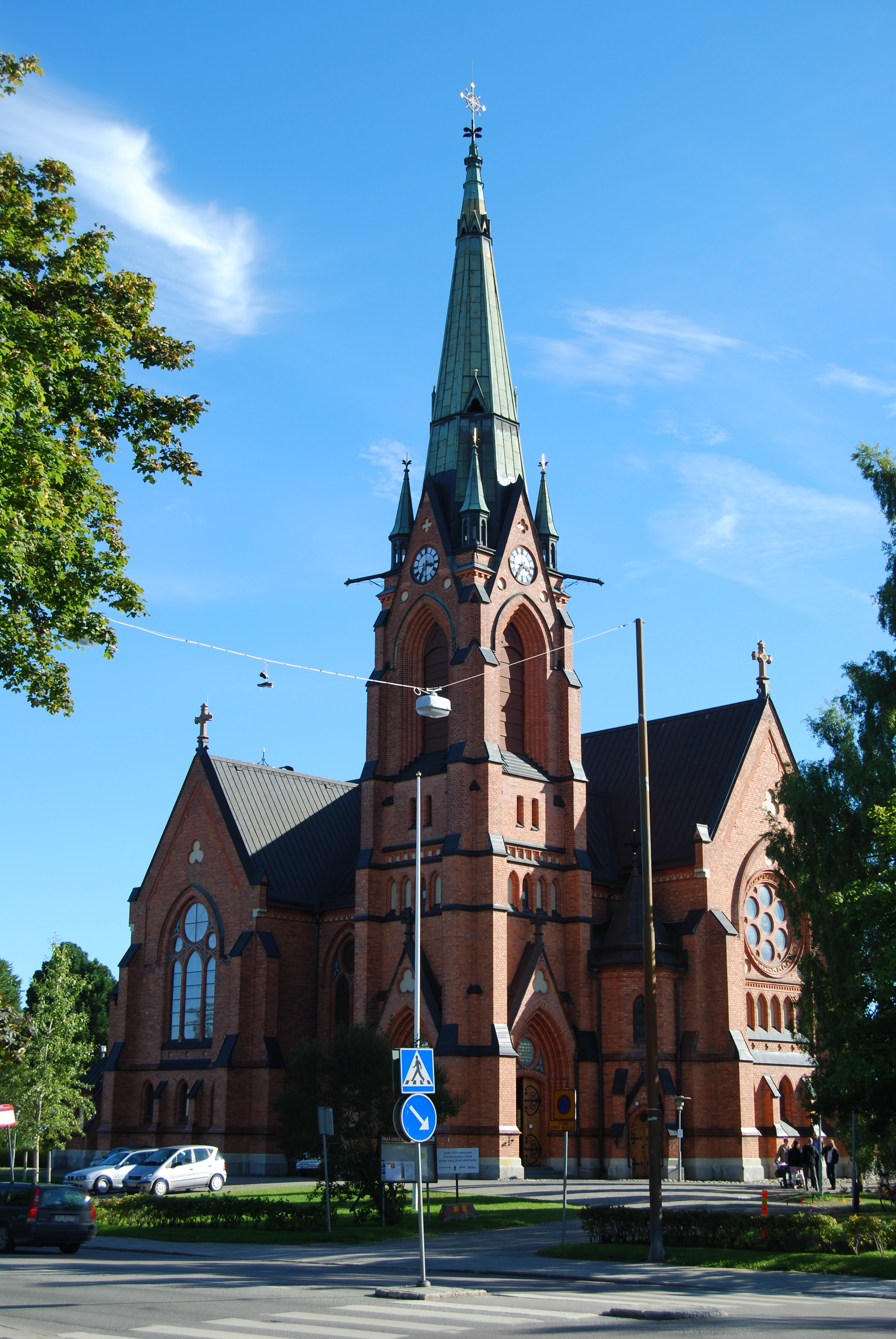
- Umeå City Church in September 2010
- Umeå City Church
- 63°49′25″N 20°16′04″E
- Location: Umeå
- Country: Sweden
- Denomination: Church of Sweden
- Website: svenskakyrkan.se

History
- Consecrated: 2 December 1894

Architecture
- Architect: Fredrik Olaus Lindström

Administration
- Diocese: Diocese of Luleå

Umeå City Church (Swedish: Umeå stads kyrka) is a church building located in central Umeå, Sweden between Vänortsparken and the north bank of Ume River. It was inaugurated on 2 December 1894, which was First Advent Sunday that year.

== History ==
The church was destroyed in 1770 by the Russian Army and again following the Umeå city fire of 1888 which destroyed most of the town. The existing new-gothic church was designed by the city architect Fredrik Olaus Lindström and built in brick with a stone foundation. The church was constructed between 1892 and 1894, and it is the third of a series of churches on the same site.

Three restorations with additions to the building have partially changed the church's original appearance.

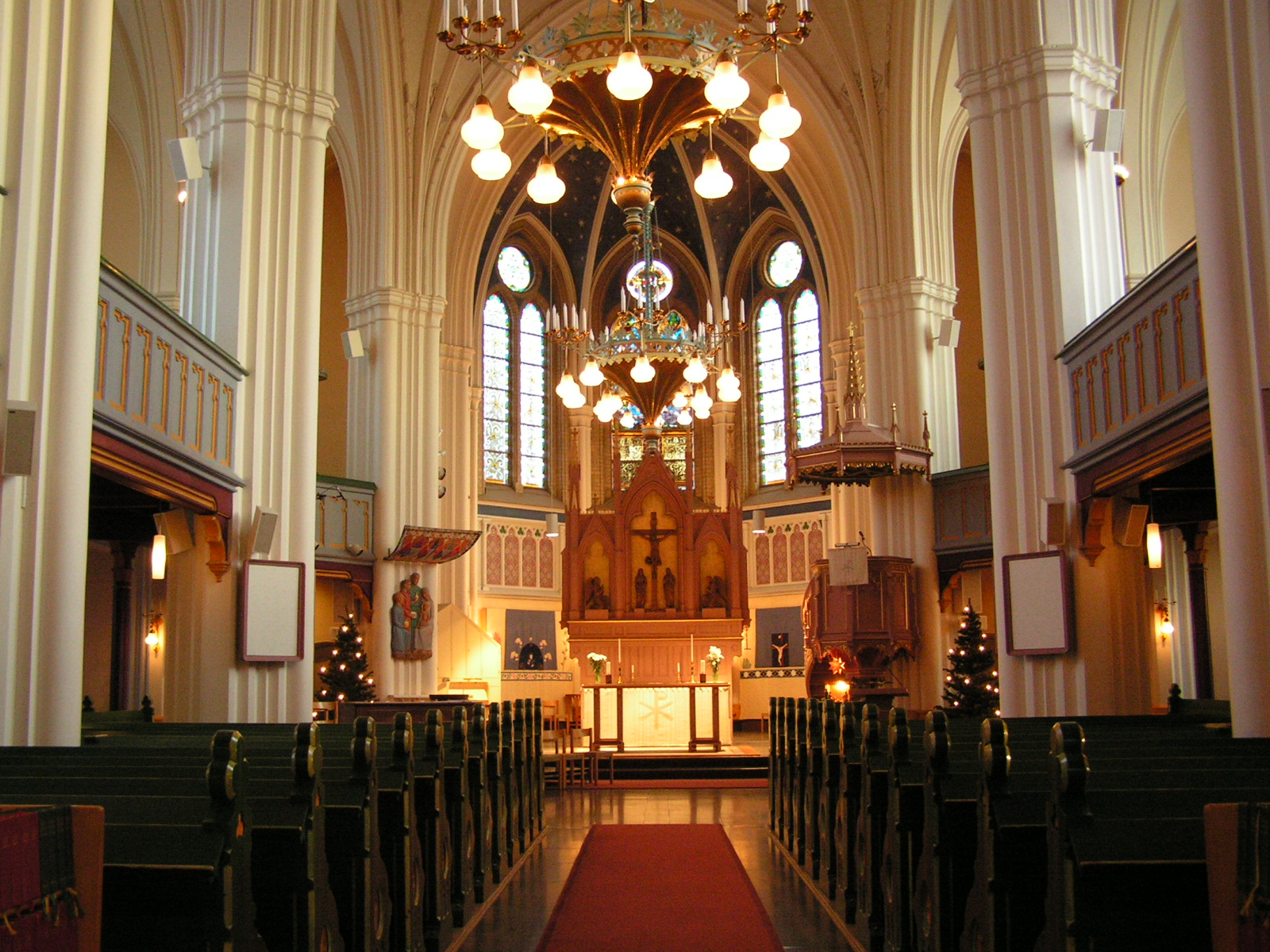
The aisle inside the Umeå City Church in January 2007.

=== First restoration ===
In 1929, the church council decided to conduct a major restoration of the church. A leaky roof that had damaged the mural on the ceiling as well as other deteriorations lead to the necessity of a major restoration; before this time, only minor repairs had been carried out. There was also a desire to obliterate the 1890s architectural image of the church portraying "the most difficult period of decadence architecture to date". Castle Architect Knut Nordenskjöld was commissioned to inspect the church and make suggestions for restoration, which he completed in 1930. His suggestions led to many discussions, especially the issue of adding an aisle among the pews. On 27 December 1935 the church council finally decided to implement castle architect's proposal. On 17 January work began on the church. The organ gallery and the choir were expanded; ventilation ducts were relocated; inner doors were added at the main entrance; part of the floor was replaced with limestone slabs, and the interior was repainted to a soft white. The church was rededicated on the first Sunday in Advent in 1937, with the presiding bishop of the Diocese of Luleå, Olof Bergqvist, participating in the service.

=== Bridge Construction ===
In 1971, it was decided that Östra Kyrkogatan would be extended over the Ume River, adding a third bridge to the city, Kyrkbron. At the commencement of construction, a grave field next to the church was discovered. In accordance to the Antiquities Act (Swedish: Fornminneslagen), construction was halted the summer of 1972, until the area had been investigated by archaeologists. The original boundaries of the cemetery were unknown and there was no registry or map. The excavation unearthed forty coffin graves with approximately sixty skeletons. In the last grave a legible name plate revealed that it was a family grave for the governor Pehr Adam Stromberg. No tombstones were found. It is believed that a tombstone was destroyed in the fire of 1888, and all documentation of the family grave was destroyed in the fire as well. After the remains were examined, they were returned to the church in plastic bags. The church janitor buried plastic bags without documenting the exact site, and a short time later, he died.
