= Umeå Energi =

Energy company based in Umeå, Swedish

- Company type: Municipal Company
- Industry: Electric utility, telecommunications
- Founded: 1887
- Area served: Umeå, Sweden
- Products: Electrical power, district cooling, district heating
- Services: Electricity generation and distribution, production, transportation and distribution, telecommunication, broadband services
- Number of employees: 270

Umeå Energi is an energy company based in the town of Umeå in Sweden. It is responsible for the supply of electricity, along with providing district cooling, district heating as well as broadband services through a subsidiary by the name of UmeNet.

== History ==
The company was founded in 1887, reportedly due to a conversation between an engineer from London and a Swedish mayor at a wedding. Mayor Rothoff attended the wedding of steam engineer John Frederick Luth and Euphrosyne Selma Helena Grafström from Umeå. Rothoff was so impressed that he left the money to buy a Luth & Rosén steam engine. This power plant was operational in 1892 when 36 arc lights became the first electric lighting in Umeå.

In 1899 power production became more ecological when a hydro electric power unit was installed at the Ume River rapids at Baggböle. A hydro plant was built at the rapids in 1916 that supplied electricity at 40,000 volts to be used over 20 miles away. This plant was not demolished until 1958 when the plant at Stornorrfors was opened.

In 1992 Umeå Energi celebrated the centenary of electric power in Umeå by donating two restored arc lights for display at Umeå Town Hall.

== Operations ==
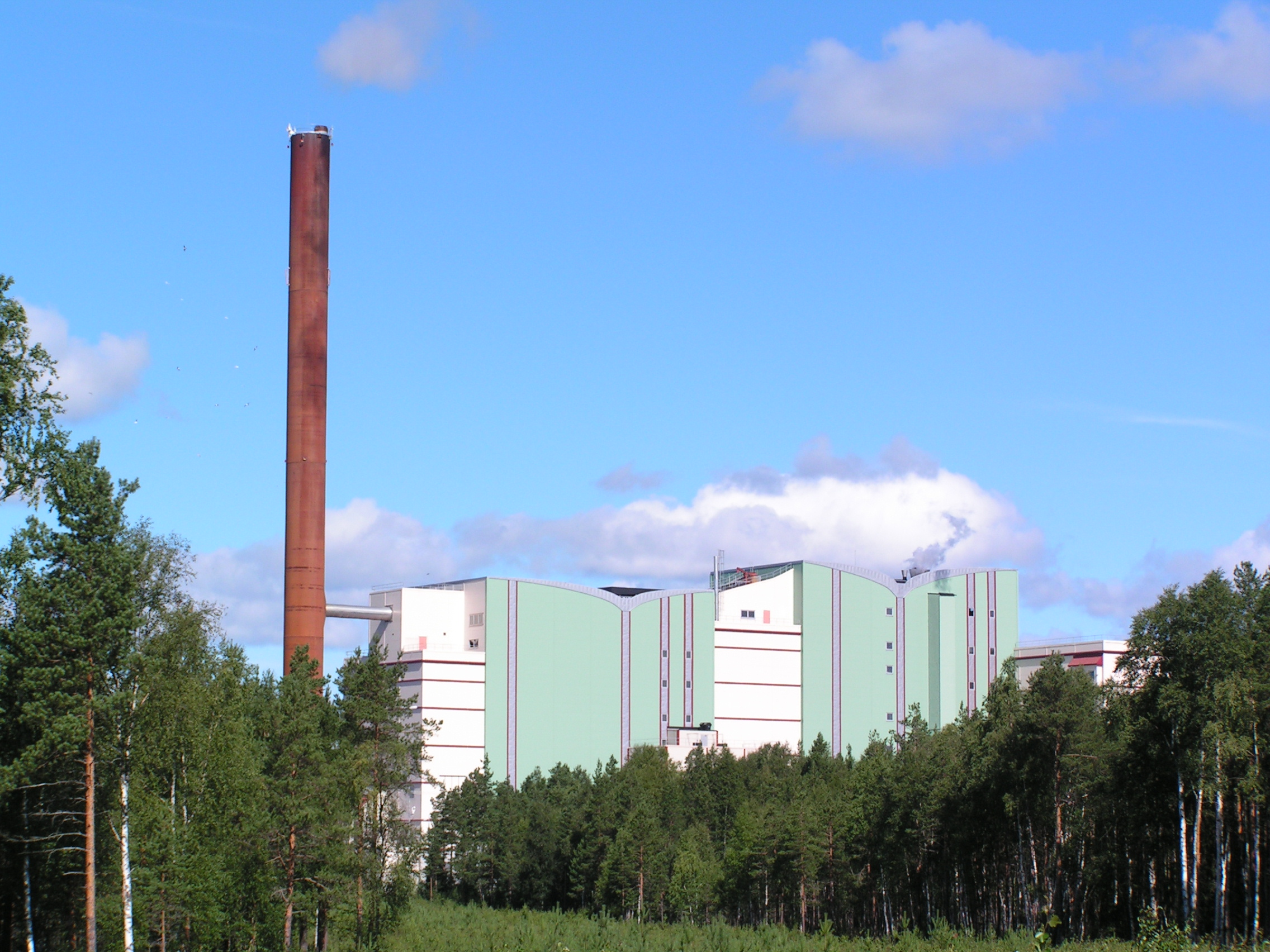
The Dava CHP plant

Umeå Energi has a power plant at Ålidhem that generates energy in the form of heat from various sources including household, industrial wastes and biomass. The heat generated is used to drive turbines. The company operates a second set of power plants at Dava that runs on cogeneration, or combined heat and power, thus generating power from wastes and biomass. There are two plants at Dava. The first Dava plant's main power source is burning waste which it can do at 20 tonnes per hour creating 65 MW of power. Most of this energy is used for district heating with only 10 MW create electricity. The plant also burns waste from the logging industry. Air pollution is kept to a minimum due to filtration systems on the exhaust gases. The second Dava plant creates 105 MW of power from a similar fuel mix as the other older plant, but with the addition of peat. In this case only 30MW is used for electricity.

The site is also home to an abandoned 100m long steel gutter that has become an iconic skateboard spot.

== Phototherapy initiative ==
Umeå witnesses sunrise at 9 a.m. and sunset at 2 p.m. during some months, thus leaving it dark for most of the day. In order to overcome this problem, in 2012 the company installed lamps in multiple bus shelters as part of a light therapy (phototherapy) initiative to minimise the effects of SAD (seasonal affective disorder). The company stated in a press release that these lamps are safe, with ultraviolet rays being filtered out, and the light is generated using power from renewable sources.
