= Fredrik Olaus Lindström =

Swedish architect and artist

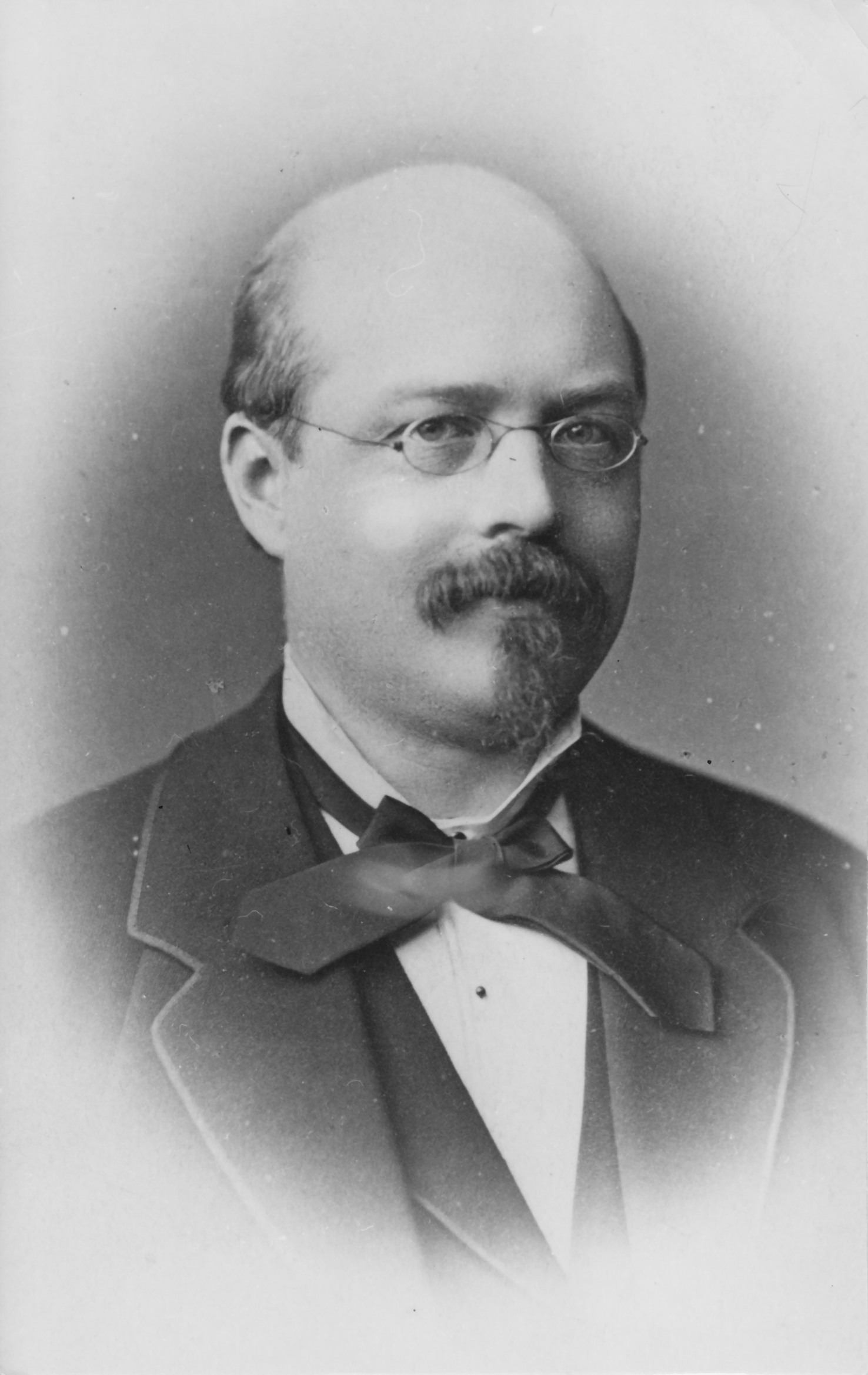
- Fredrik Olaus Lindström
- Born: 21 March 1847; Stockholm, Sweden
- Died: 6 November 1919 (aged 72); Stockholm, Sweden
- Occupation: architect

Fredrik Olaus Lindström (Note: Often written F O Lindström.) (21 March 1847 – 6 November 1919) was a Swedish architect and artist.

== Life ==
Lindström was born in Stockholm, Sweden. He studied at the Royal Swedish Academy of Fine Arts in 1865–1873. He worked as an architect in Stockholm 1876–1888, in Umeå as a city architect in 1888–1893, in Gävle in 1893–1897, then again in Stockholm. He was hired as city architect in Umeå to lead the rebuilding of the town after the great fire in 1888. There he designed buildings including Umeå Town Hall and Umeå City Church, among others.

Lindström was also a talented artist. A gouache portrait by him of the writer August Blanche (1811–1868) is in the Swedish National Museum.

== Notes and references ==
Notes
