= Tegsbron =

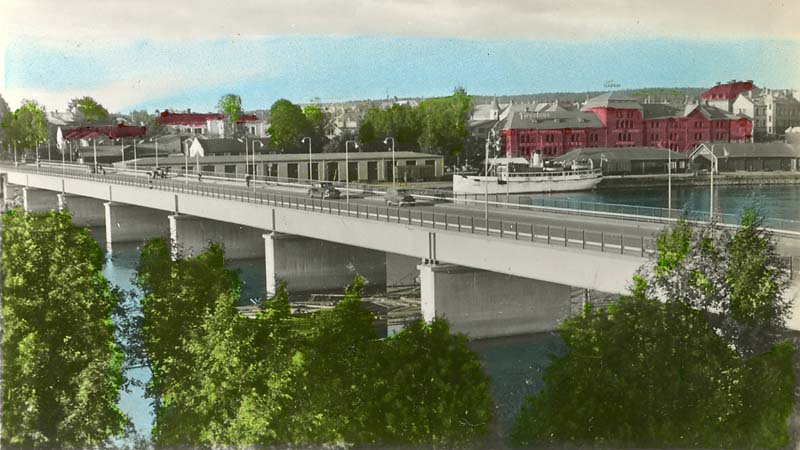
- The bridge
- Coordinates: 63°49′25.4″N 20°14′58″E
- Carries: Vehicles, pedestrians and bikes
- Crosses: Ume River
- Locale: Umeå
- Maintained by: Umeå municipality

Characteristics
- Material: Girders

History
- Construction start: 1945
- Construction end: 1949

Tegsbron is a bridge in Umeå that took the major European routes E4 and E12 over the Ume River until 2012.

The construction of Tegsbron started in 1945 and it was opened on 10 October 1949 becoming Umeå's second bridge over the Ume river.

Later it was decided to build a new bridge named Kyrkbron. This bridge was designed to relieve the traffic on the Tegsbron bridge. Kyrkbron was designed because it was predicted there would be a drastic increase in car traffic in Umea, however this proved to be very optimistic.

This bridge took the major European routes E4 and E12 over the Ume River until 2012. The E4 is the road that links north and south Sweden, whilst the E12 links Norway to Finland.

== Sources ==
- Så blev det en kyrkbro i Umeå. Umeå: Kommunkansliet. 1975.
- Sjöström, Eskil, ed. (1989). "Så blev det en kyrkbro – men partienheten brast". Så formades vårt Umeå: minnen av kommunalpolitiken i Umeå under 1950– och 1960-talen samt åren närmast därefter : gamla folkpartisters summerade intryck på 1980-talet. Umeå: Västerbottens-kuriren. pp. 90–94. ISBN 91-87732-00-9.
