= Umeå city fire =

Fire in Umeå, Sweden on 25 June 1888

Coordinates: 63.825°N 20.265°E

Umeå City Fire
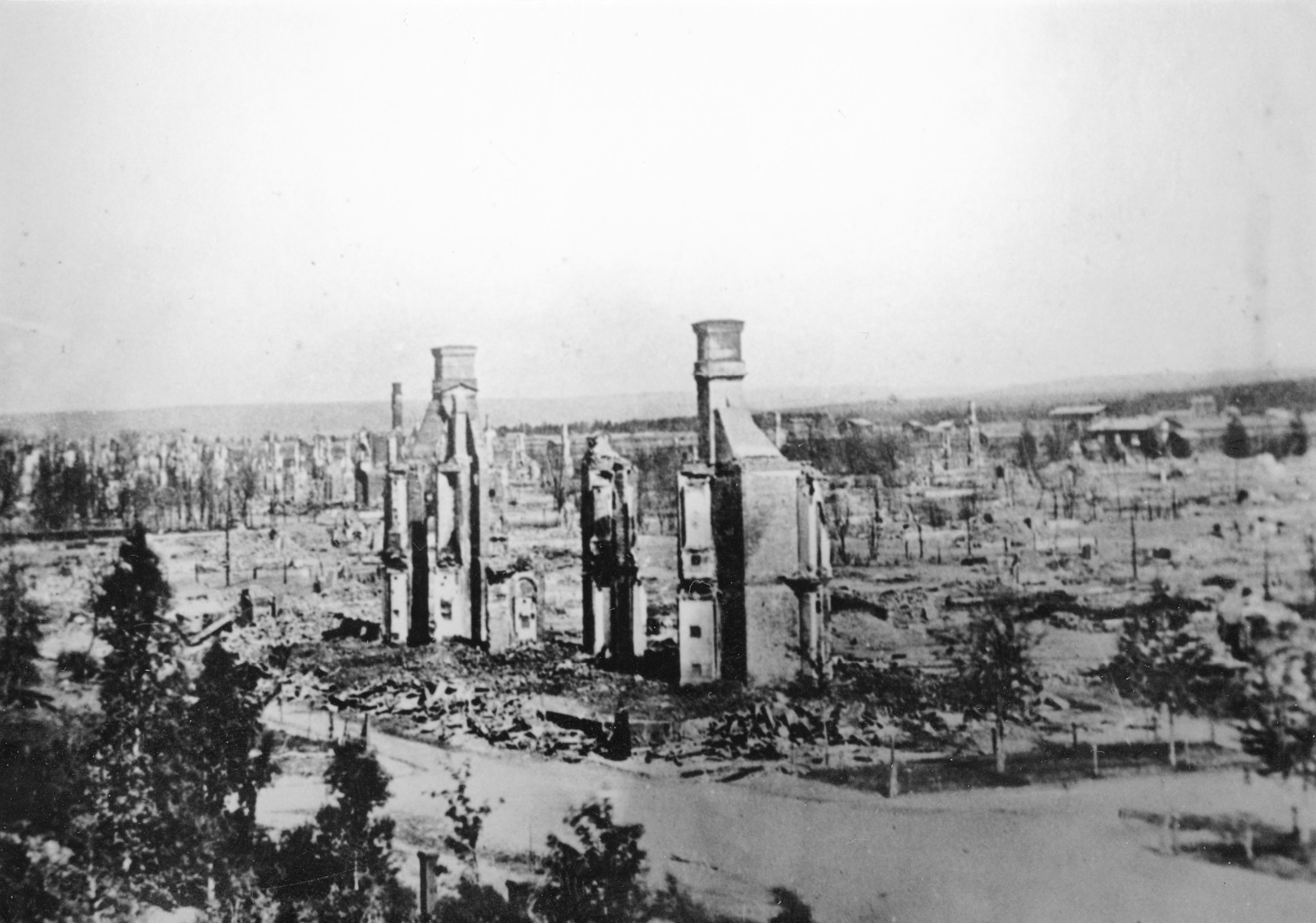
- A picture from Umeå Old Prison's roof towards the northwest after the devastating fire of 1888
- Native name: Stadsbranden i Umeå
- Date: 25 June 1888
- Location: Umeå, Sweden
- Type: Fire

The Great Fire of Umeå took place in 1888 and destroyed most of the city of Umeå in Sweden. The unusual windy weather conditions also contributed to two other fires on the same day in Sweden. Umeå took the opportunity to complete its plans to restructure the city. Part of the new design included planting of birch trees along the streets, leading to Umeå being known as the "City of Birches".

== History ==
The preponderance of fires around the city increased as agriculture methods changed. Historically the Sámi people had not used burning as a part of their practice, as it destroyed the lichen required by their reindeer. However, new farmers frequently used swidden or slash and burn farming. During the nineteenth century, the timber industry moved north, clearing the land of trees but leaving the waste behind and creating a fire risk. There was a fire in Norrland in 1851, and in the later 19th century fires swept the area every ten years or so: there were major fires in 1868 and in 1878, but the most damaging to Umeå occurred on the afternoon of 25 June 1888. This fire was reported to have started at a brewery near Renmarksbäcken.

On the same day there was a devastating fire in Sundsvall driven by high wind. There were several other forest fires in Sweden that day, and the settlement of Lilla Edet near Gothenburg also burnt to the ground.

In Umeå, the town hall was destroyed as were the Teg shipyards and houses in the eastern parts of Umeå and on Ön Island. The fire left 2,300 of the 3,000 inhabitants without homes.

== After the fire ==
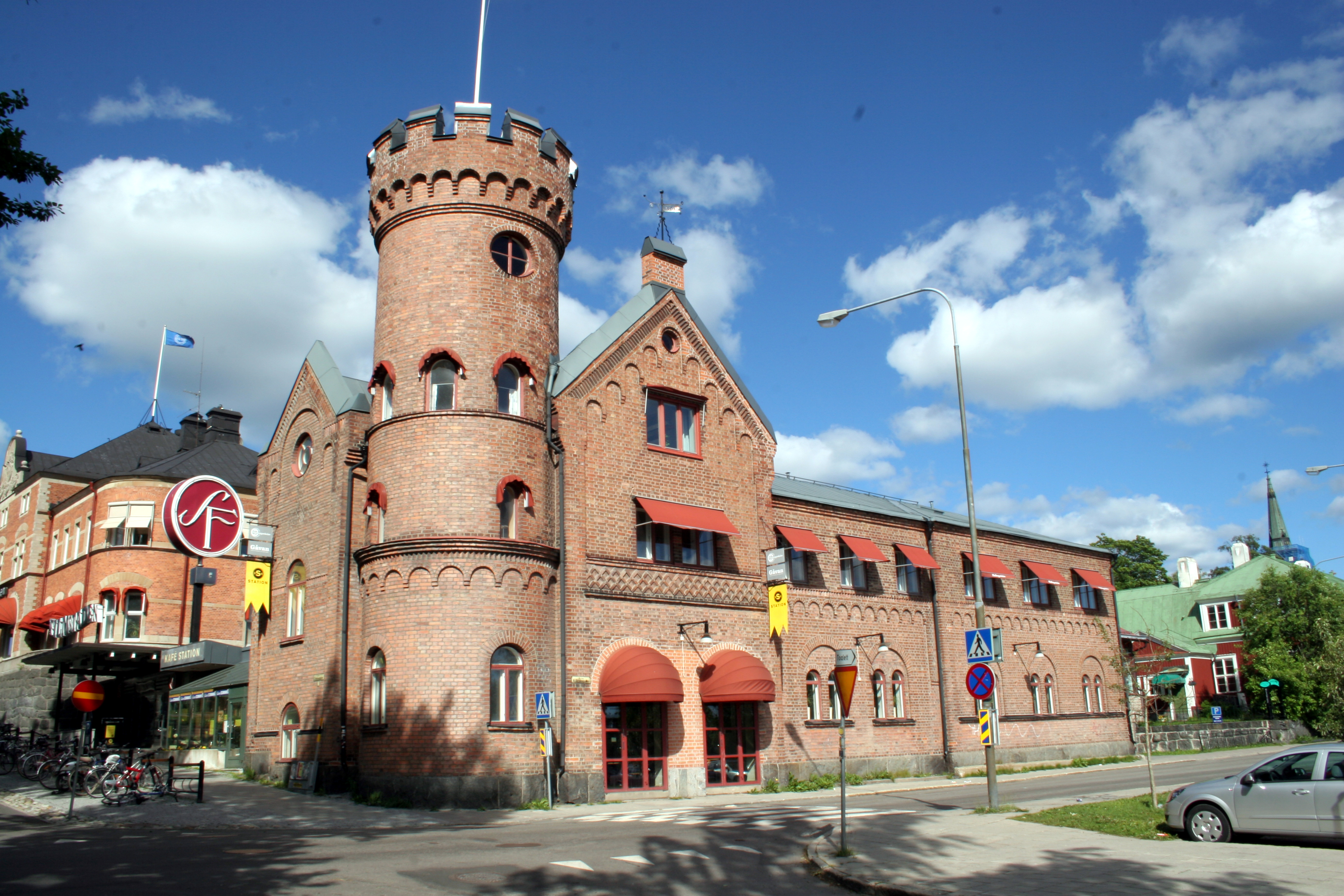
The oldest fire station in the city dates from the year of the fire

The fires at three unconnected Swedish settlements were widely reported. A collection made in California to aid the victims raised $5,000 and blankets and tents were sent from New Zealand to help the homeless. King Oscar and his ministers toured the area and collections were organised in all the major Swedish towns.

Umeå had drawn up improved urban plans when it became a government requirement in 1874 and had already started making changes to the city infrastructure. The town of Sundsvall was arguing for a reduction in the new insurance rules three years after its fire because it had decided to rebuild its buildings in stone. To prevent the spread of fire between wooden buildings, streets were designed to be wide enough to serve as firebreaks. The streets were lined with birch trees; as a result, Umeå came to be known as the "Björkarnas Stad", the "City of Birches".

The Umeå Town Hall was rebuilt on the original site to a design by Fredrik Olaus Lindström. It was completed in 1890. Umeå City Church also had to be rebuilt according to a design by Lindstrom, whilst the brick built old prison survived. The oldest fire station in the city is brick-built and dates from 1888.
