= European route E4 =

Road in trans-European E-road network

E4

Route information
- Length: 1,590 km (990 mi)

Major junctions
- North end: Tornio, Finland
- South end: Helsingborg, Sweden

Location
- Countries: Finland, Sweden

Highway system
- International E-road network; A Class; B Class
| ← E3 | → E5 |

European route E4 passes from north to south through Sweden from the border with Finland, with a total length of 1,590 kilometres (990 mi). The Finnish part lies entirely within Tornio in northern Finland, and is only 1 kilometre (0.62 mi) long. The Swedish part traverses most of Sweden except the extreme north and the west coast region, and is commonly considered the highway backbone of Sweden, since it passes in the vicinity of many of its largest cities and through the capital Stockholm. In particular, it is the mainline road used by most vehicle traffic, both cars and lorries, between the north (Norrland) and south of Sweden or beyond.

From Haparanda on the Finnish border, it stretches south along the Gulf of Bothnia to Gävle, then on a more inland route southwards. It ends in Helsingborg in Sweden, at the port for the ferry to Helsingør in Denmark. The route intersects with European route E6 just outside Helsingborg, which continues to Trelleborg on the southern coast of Sweden.

== History and naming ==
The International E-road network convention was signed in 1950, with the E4 routed Lisbon-Madrid-Barcelona-Nimes-Geneva-Basel-Frankfurt-Hamburg-Helsingør-Stockholm-Haparanda-Helsinki. The part in Sweden was signposted E4 in 1962. Until 1962, the road Helsingborg–Stockholm was called highway 1, and Stockholm–Haparanda highway 13.

Under the new system of European routes which was decided in 1975, but introduced in Sweden in 1992, it was planned to have been a part of E55, but it retains the pre-1992 designation (E4) within Sweden, because the expenses connected with re-signing this long road portion would be too great. Besides the signs along the road, there are thousands of signs, especially in cities, showing how to reach the E4 road. The road is now fully authorised as E4 by the relevant authority, not as E55.

== Route ==
North of Gävle the road is of mixed standard. Depending on the fashion at the time of construction, it is either a single standard carriageway road, usually 8–13 metres (26–43 ft) wide, or a 2+1 road, a 13–14 metres (43–46 ft) wide road with two lanes in one direction and one in the other with a steel wire barrier in between, or sometimes a motorway with two lanes in each direction. North of Sundsvall, the road passes through several of the larger cities as city streets.

South of Gävle, the road becomes a continuous motorway, the final stretch of the motorway to be opened was the road between Uppsala and Mehedeby, which was inaugurated on 17 October 2007. South of Gävle, the speed limit is 110 km/h (70 mph) on 60% and 120 km/h (75 mph) on 30% of the road. North of Gävle there are varying speed limits, with 90, 100, and 110 km/h (55, 60, and 70 mph) as the most common. The speed limits on the main roads in Sweden were changed on many stretches in October 2008, which saw the introduction of the 120 km/h limit.

The E4 is the fastest road to go from Germany/Denmark to areas north of the Arctic Circle, including places in Norway such as Tromsø or the North Cape.

The route passes through or nearby the cities Tornio, Haparanda, Luleå, Piteå, Skellefteå, Umeå, Örnsköldsvik, Härnösand, Sundsvall, Hudiksvall, Söderhamn, Gävle, Uppsala, Stockholm, Södertälje, Nyköping, Norrköping, Linköping, Jönköping, Värnamo, Ljungby, and Helsingborg.

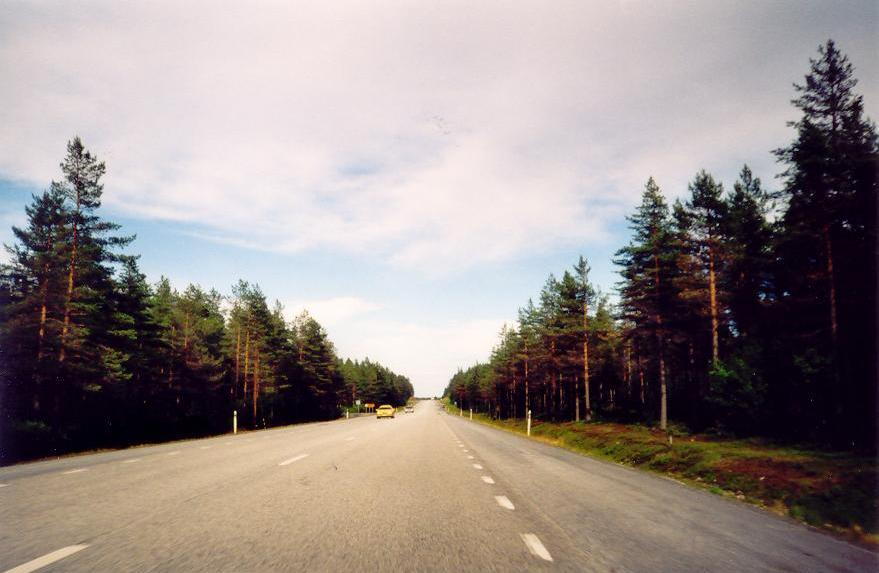
E4 near Örnsköldsvik. A common standard between Tornio and Gävle. Some roads of this standard have been converted to 2+1 road with a barrier.

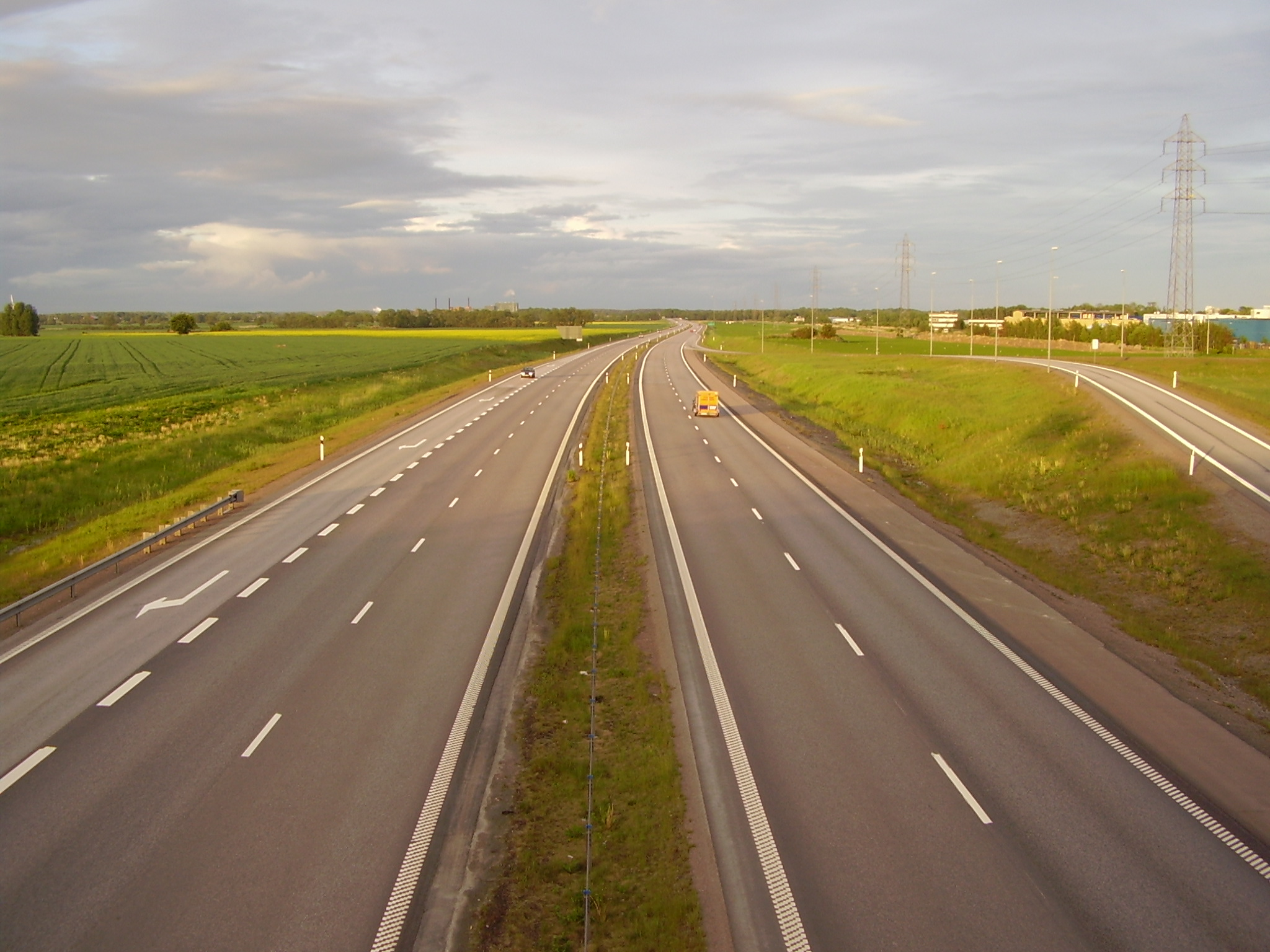
E4 near Linköping, Sweden.

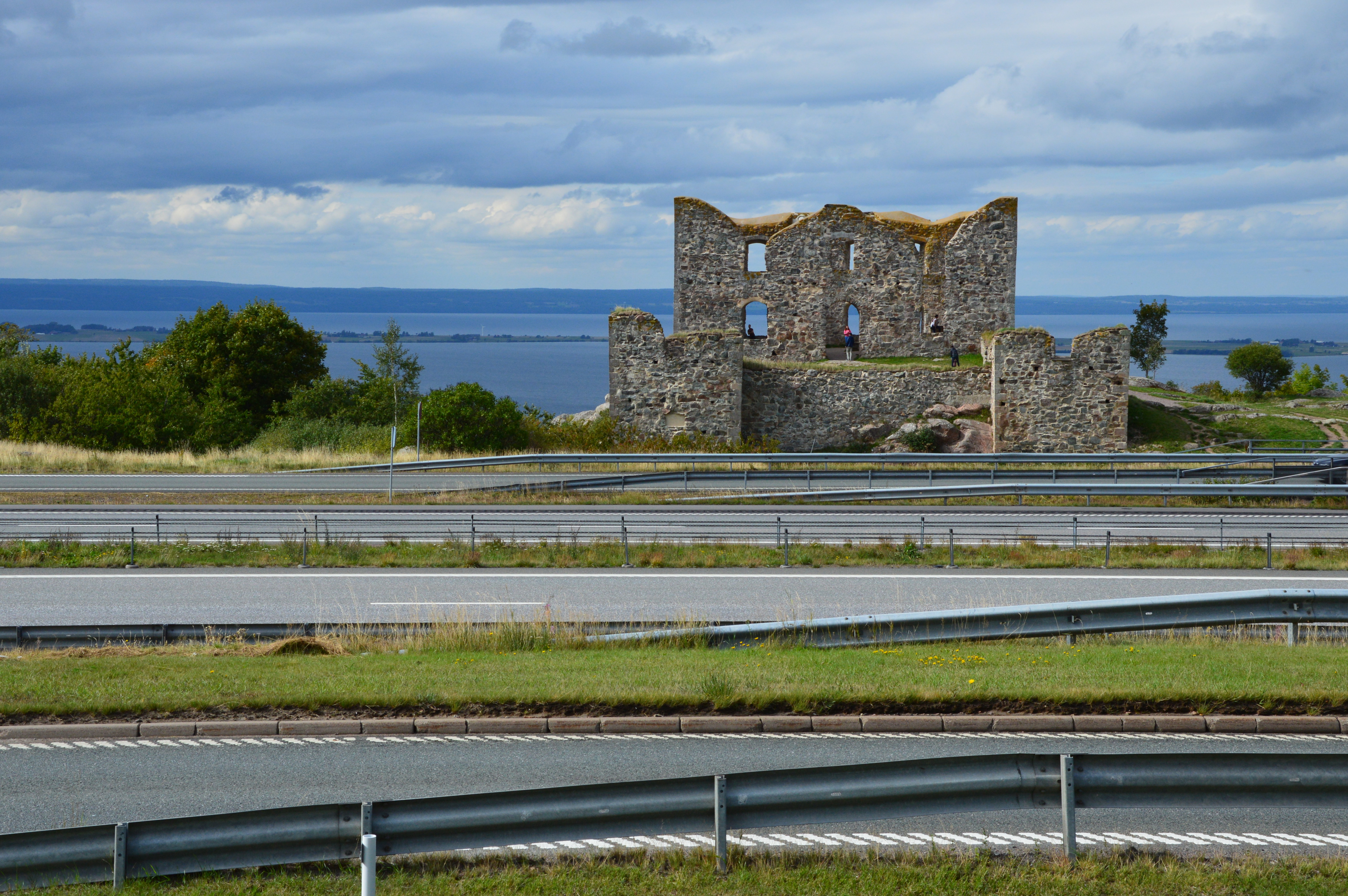
E4 180 m above Lake Vättern. Ruins of Brahehus.

== Detailed route ==
| Region | National road number | Section | Junction | Northbound destinations | Southbound destinations |
|---|---|---|---|---|---|
| (European Union) (Finland) Lapland Kemi-Tornio sub-region | National Road 29 | Tornio | Tornio N21 Pello, Kilpisjärvi | Kemi Rovaniemi | Haparanda, Luleå (Sweden) |
| (European Union) (Sweden) Norrbotten County | / | Haparanda - Luleå | Haparanda N99 Karesuando, Övertorneå, Haparanda-Centrum Sangis N398 Hedenäset, Övertorneå, Björkfors Vånafjärden, Karlsborg Karlsborg Kalix Stråkanäs Månsbyn Morjärv Töre E10 Töre, Morjärv, Överkalix, Gällivare, Kiruna Jämtön, Vitå, Avafors, Rörbäck Strömsund Råneå, Kängsön, Niemisel Råneå, Prästholmen N383 Boden, Smedsbyn Bensbyn, Brändön, Persön Rutvik, Luleå N97 Jokkmokk, Boden, Gammelstaden, Luleå | Haparanda, Tornio (Finland) | Luleå Sundsvall |
| (European Union) (Sweden) Norrbotten County | / | Luleå - Jävre | Luleå-Industry (only southbound) Luleå-Industry, Luleå Airport Luleå, Luleå Airport, Bergnäset Måttsund N94 Arvidsjaur, Älvsbyn, Antnäs, Kallax, Måttsund Sjulsmark, Alhamn, Mörön, Vallen, Ersnäs Älvsbyn, Öjebyn N N374 Piteå, Öjebyn Piteå-Industry (only northbound) Piteå, Munksund, Öjebyn N373 Arvidsjaur, Långträsk, Bergsviken Jävre N, Hemmingsmark Jävre S Jävrebodarna | Luleå Haparanda Kiruna | Skellefteå Sundsvall |
| Västerbotten County | / | Jävre - Skellefteå | Kinnbäck Alund, Renholmen, Åbyn Tåme, Tåmeträsk Byske, Fällfors Byske, Lundback Stavaträsk, Drängsmark, Ostvik, Ostänbäck Ostänbäck, Frostkåge, Ostvik Spisen, Brännäset Kåge N, Ersmark, Jörn Kåge S Boviken Solbacken N95 Arvidsjaur, Skellefteå, Bodø (Norway) Skellefteå | Luleå Kiruna | Skellefteå Umeå Sundsvall |
| Västerbotten County | / | Skellefteå - Umeå | N364 Skellefteå Airport, Burträsk Tjärn Tjärn, Innervik, Yttervik Skelleftehamn, Innervik, Yttervik Bureå Ljusvattnet Övre Bäck Mångbyn Lövånger Västanbyn Ånäset Gumboda Sikeå Bygdeå Djäkneboda Sävar, Skeppsvik, Holmöarna Sävar, Bullmark, Täfteå Anumark E12, N92 Umeå-Centrum, Dorotea, Vännäs, Lycksele, Mo i Rana (Norway) Umeå Umeå | Luleå Skellefteå | Umeå Sundsvall |
| Västerbotten County | / | Umeå - Rundvik | E12 Holmsund, Umeå Airport, Vaasa (Finland) E12 Umeå-Centrum, Dorotea, Vännäs, Lycksele, Haparanda, Mo i Rana (Norway) Norrmjöle, Stöcksjö Ansmark Sörmjöle Hörnefors Levar, Nordmaling N, Gräsmyr Nordmaling C N353 Nordmaling S, Bjurholm, Norrfors, Olofsfors Lögdeälven Rastplats Rundvik, Lögdeå Lögdeå, Långron (only northbound) | Skellefteå Umeå | Örnsköldsvik Sundsvall |
| Västernorrland County | / | Rundvik - Örnsköldsvik | Saluböle Dombäck, Husum, Björna, Gideå, Örnsköldsvik Airport Gideåbacka Kasa Mosjön Rastplats Ovansjö Arnäsvall, Gideå, Örnsköldsvik Airport N352 Fredrika, Björna, Örnsköldsvik Hospital Örnsköldsvik | Skellefteå Umeå | Örnsköldsvik Sundsvall |
| Västernorrland County | / | Örnsköldsvik - Sundsvall | Domsjö, Själevad N335, N348 Åsele, Bredbyn, Mellansel, Sollefteå, Sidensjö Skorped, Sidensjö, Köpmanholmen, Bjästa Docksta Skoved Sjöland Ullånger N332 Lunde, Herrskog, Gallsäter, Kramfors, Höga Kusten Airport (only southbound) Nordingrå Tjärned Gräta Klockestrand, Skullersta Lunde, Nyadal, Lövvik Rastplats N90 Lunde, Kramfors, Sollefteå Utansjö, Vålånger Älandsbro Djuphamnen, Saltvik, Bondsjöhöjden Härnösand Viksjö Härnösand-Centrum Härnösand-Centrum (only northbound) Rastplats Bölesjön Torsboda, Söråker, Stavreviken Söråker, Stavreviken, Åstön, Tynderö, Hamn Sundsvall–Timrå Airport N331 Sollefteå, Viksjö, Bergeforsen, Sörberge Timrå N Timrå Timrå-Centrum Rastplats Alnön, Bergsåker, Sundsbruk Sundsbruk, Birsta (only northbound) Bosvedjan, Ortviken, Tunadalshamnen Sundsvall Sundsvall-Centrum N, Haga, Skönsberg | Örnsköldsvik Umeå | Sundsvall Gävle |
| Västernorrland County | / | Sundsvall - Gnarp | E14 Sundsvall-Centrum S, Östersund, Trondheim (Norway) Kvissleby, Svartvik, Bredsand, Stockvik Matfors, Nolby Lörudden, Ängom, Njurundabommen Rastplats Armsjön | Örnsköldsvik Sundsvall | Gävle Uppsala Stockholm |
| Gävleborg County | / | Gnarp - Gävle | Gnarp N307 Hassela, Bergsjö Harmånger Vattrång Bergsjö, Ilsbo, Hudiksvall Airport N84 Hudiksvall, Ljusdal, Sveg Rastplats Largeyan (only southbound) Iggesund Rastplats (only northbound) Njutånger, Nianfors Enånger Lindefallet, Boda Bruk, Långvind Kungsgården, Långvind Rastplats Alebosjön (only southbound) Kungsgården, Trönö, Skärså, Vågbro Söderhamn (only southbound) N50 Söderhamn, Falun, Bollnäs, Sandarne, E-Center, Söderhamn Airport Söderala Vallvik, Ljusne, Bergvik Rastplats Norrbränningen (only southbound) Rastplats Sörbränningen (only southbound) N83 Ljusdal, Järvsö, Bollnäs, Tönnebro Rastplats Högbacka (only southbound) Rastplats Stensjön (only northbound) N303 Bergby, Ockelbo, Norrsundet, Hamrånge Rastplats Skarvberget Gävle-N Gävle | Örnsköldsvik Sundsvall | Gävle Uppsala Stockholm |
| Gävleborg County | / | Gävle - Mehedeby | 199 E16, N56, N68 Västerås, Örebro, Sandviken, Falun, Borlänge, Gävle–Sandviken Airport, Oslo (Norway) 199b Gävle-Centrum 198 Rastplats Gävle 197 N76 Östhammar, Hedesunda, Gävle-S | Sundsvall Gävle | Uppsala Stockholm |
| Uppsala County | / | Mehedeby - Uppsala | 196 Älvkarleby, Älvkarleö 195 N291 Älvkarleby, Mehedeby 194 Söderfors, Mehedeby 193 N292 Hargshamn, Gimo, Söderfors, Tierp 192 Östervåla, Månkarbo 191 Örbyhus, Husby 190 Vattholma, Björklinge Rastplats Tre Ängar (only northbound) Rastplats Torsberget 189 N290 Storvreta, Gamla Uppsala, Österbybruk 188 N55, N72, N288 Uppsala N, Strängnäs, Östhammar, Västerås, Enköping 187 N282 Uppsala S, Edsbro, Almunge 186 Uppsala S - Centrum (only northbound) | Sundsvall Gävle | Uppsala Stockholm |
| Uppsala County | / | Uppsala - Knivsta | Rastplats Mora Stenar (only northbound) 184 N77 Norrtälje, Knivsta, Kapellskär, Mariehamn (Åland), Paldiski (Estonia) | Sundsvall Gävle Uppsala | Stockholm |
| Stockholm County | / | Knivsta - Stockholm | 182 Stockholm Arlanda Airport, Märsta N - Centrum, Arlandastad N V 181 N263, N273 Sigtuna, Märsta S, Arlandastad S 180 Arlandastad-Centrum 179 Rosersberg Rastplats Stora Wäsby 176 N268 Vallentuna, Upplands Väsby N - Centrum 175 Upplands Väsby S 174 N267, E18 Enköping, Rotebro 173 N265, N262, E18 Täby, Danderyd, Norrtälje, Sollentuna 172 N275 Vällingby, Sollentuna-Centrum, Kista N 171 E18 Kista S, Stockholm Bromma Airport, Västerås, Örebro, Karlstad, Oslo (Norway) 170 Helenelund, Silverdal (only northbound) 169, 168 E18 Frösunda, Norrtälje, Mariehamn (Åland), Paldiski (Estonia) 167 Sundbyberg, Solna-Centrum 165, 164 Solna S, Karolinska University Hospital E20, N277 Lidingö, Stockholm N | Sundsvall Gävle Uppsala | Stockholm |
| Stockholm County | E20 Stockholm Ring Road | Stockholm | 163 Stockholm-Centrum 162 Sundbyberg, Solna (only northbound) 161 N275 Vällingby, Hornsberg, Stockholm Bromma Airport 160b N275 Vällingby, Stockholm Bromma Airport (only northbound) 160a Stockholm-Centrum, Fridhemsplan 158 Stora Essingen 157 Gröndal (only southbound) 156 Aspudden, Liljeholmen (only southbound) 155 N75, N222, N226 Årsta, Älvsjö, Nynäshamn, Värmdö, Visby, Ventspils (Latvia), Gdańsk (Poland) | Sundsvall Gävle Uppsala | Gothenburg Helsingborg Södertälje |
| Stockholm County | E20 | Stockholm - Södertälje | 154 Hägerstensåsen, Midsommarkransen, Västberga 153 N271 Västertorp, Hägersten, Fruängen 152 Segeltorp, Sätra, Bredäng, Mälarhöjden 151 Skärholmen N - Centrum, Kungens Kurva N - Centrum, Vårberg 150 Skärholmen S, Kungens Kurva S 148 N259 Huddinge-Centrum, Flemingsberg, Vårby (only southbound) 147 N259 Haninge, Ekerö 146a Hallunda 146b N258 Tumba, Alby 145 Rönninge, Salem 144 N225 Södertälje N, Nynäshamn, Visby, Ventspils (Latvia), Gdańsk (Poland) E20 Gothenburg, Strängnäs, Södertälje-Centrum, Eskilstuna, Örebro, Karlstad, Oslo (Norway) | Stockholm | Gothenburg Helsingborg Södertälje |
| Stockholm County | / | Södertälje - Vagnhärad | 142 Södertälje S, Hamnen 141 N57 Katrineholm, Gnesta, Järna 139 Hölö, Mörkö, Tullgarns slott | Södertälje Stockholm | Norrköping Helsingborg |
| Södermanland County | / | Vagnhärad - Strömsfors | 138 N218, N219 Vagnhärad, Studsvik, Trosa, Tullgarns slott Rastplats Sillekrog 137 N224 Lästringe, Gnesta (only southbound) 136 N224 Lästringe, Gnesta (only northbound) 135 Tystberga, Stendörrens naturreservat, Nynäs slott 134 Nyköping Ö, Rosvalla Nyköping Eventcenter 133 N52, N53 Nyköping-Centrum, Örebro, Eskilstuna, Stockholm Skavsta Airport 132 N53 Nyköping V, Oxelösund 131 Enstaberga, Bergshammar (only southbound) Rastplats Nyköpingsbro 129 Arkösund, Jönåker 128 N216 Katrineholm, Björkvik, Alberga 127 Stavsjö | Södertälje Stockholm | Norrköping Helsingborg |
| Östergötland County | / | Strömsfors - Norrköping | 126 Getå, Krokek, Kolmården Wildlife Park, Strömsfors 125 Getå (only northbound) 124 N55, N56 Åby, Katrineholm, Händelö, Jursla 123 N55, N56 Åby, Katrineholm, Strängnäs, Västerås (only northbound) 122 N55, N56 Norrköping N-Centrum (only southbound) 121 N51 Örebro, Finspång | Södertälje Stockholm | Norrköping Helsingborg |
| Östergötland County | / | Norrköping - Linköping | 119 E22, N209 Norrköping S, Kalmar, Arkösund, Söderköping, Västervik, Norrköping Airport 118 Skärblacka 117 Kimstad, Löfstad slott 116 Norsholm, Västerby (only southbound) 115 N210, N215 Norsholm, Söderköping, Finspång, Linghem, Löfstad slott Rastplats Herrbeta 113 N35 Linköping Ö-Centrum, Västervik, Åtvidaberg, Linköping/Saab Airport 112 Linköping N-Centrum, Berg | Norrköping Stockholm | Linköping Helsingborg |
| Östergötland County | / | Linköping - Gränna | 111 N34 Linköping V, Vimmerby, Motala 110 N206 Vadstena, Skänninge, Mantorp Rastplats Svartåns (only southbound) 109 Mjölby Ö-Centrum 108 N32, N50 Mjölby V, Vetlanda, Tranås, Boxholm, Örebro, Motala 107 Väderstad 106 Vadstena, Ödeshög 105 Vida Vättern | Linköping Stockholm | Jönköping Gothenburg Helsingborg |
| Jönköping County | / | Gränna - Jönköping | Rastplats Brahehus 104 N133 Tranås, Gränna, Visingsö 103 Gyllene Uttern Rastplats Gunneryd (only southbound) 102 Ölmstad, Vätterleden Rastplats Vista Kulle 101 132N Aneby, Brunstop Norrängen 100 Huskvarna Centrum, Fabriksmuseum, Öxnehaga 99 Österängen, Rosenlund, Elmia, Vättersnäs 98a 31Ö, 40Ö, 47Ö Nässjö, Västervik, Oskarshamn 98b Jönköping Centrum 97 A6 Center 96 Ljungarum N, Ryhov hospital, Solås Center 95a Jönköping Centrum 95b 40N, 26N, 47N, 195N Jönköping V, Gothenburg, Borås, Skövde, Trollhättan, Jönköping Airport | Linköping Stockholm | Jönköping Gothenburg Helsingborg |
| Jönköping County | / | Jönköping - Värnamo | 94 Norrahammar, Barnarp 93 Taberg, Barnarp, Torsvik N 92 Lovsjö, Torsvik S 91 N30 Växjö, Vrigstad 90 Vaggeryd N-Centrum, Bondstorp, Byarum 89 Vaggeryd S, Götafors 88 Skillingaryd N, Götaström, Båramo 87 152N Skillingaryd S, Bredaryd, Hillerstorp, Tofteryd 86 Hörle, Klevshult, Hagshult Rastplats Hörle 85 127N, 151N Värnamo N-Centrum, Vetlanda, Hestra, Gnosjö 84 N27, N153 Värnamo S, Gothenburg, Borås, Växjö, Karlskrona, Kalmar, Varberg | Jönköping Stockholm | Helsingborg Malmö |
| Kronoberg County | / | Värnamo - Markaryd | 83 Vittaryd, Dörarp, Tånnö, Toftaholm 82 Åby Rastplats Laganrasten 81 Lagan, Bolmsö 80 N25 Ljungby Centrum, Växjö, Kalmar, Karlskrona 79 N25 Ljungby S, Halmstad 78 Hamneda, Hornsborg, Nöttja 77 N120 Tingsryd, Älmhult, Traryd Rastplats Sjöboda 76 N120 Tingsryd, Traryd, Strömsnäsbruk, Hinneryd 75 N15 Markaryd N-Centrum, Halmstad, Karlshamn, Osby, Timsfors, Karlskrona 74 N117 Markaryd S-Centrum, Hässleholm | Jönköping Stockholm | Helsingborg Malmö |
| Skåne County | / | Markaryd - Helsingborg | 73 Skånes-Fagerhult 72 N24, N108 Laholm, Örkelljunga, Perstorp, Halmstad, Hässleholm, Kristianstad 71 Eket 70 Eket 69 Stidsvig 68 N13 Östra Ljungby, Ängelholm, Höör, Klippan 67 N21, N112 Åstorp N-Centrum, Kristianstad, Höganäs 66 Åstorp S, Nyvång 65 E6, N110 Bjuv, Hyllinge, Halmstad, Gothenburg, Oslo (Norway) 30 E6, E20 Helsingborg S, Malmö, Trelleborg, Gothenburg, Ängelholm, Oslo (Norway), Copenhagen (Denmark) IKEA Helsingborg N111 Höganäs, Råå, Helsingborg S, Helsingør (Denmark) Helsingborg | Jönköping Stockholm | Helsingborg Malmö |
