= Mehedia =

Mehedia may refer to:

- Mehdya, a town in Kénitra Province, Morocco
- Mahdia, a large coastal town in Tunisia
- Mechtat Mehedia, a village in Relizane Province, Algeria

== See also ==
- Mehede, an urban area in Tierp Municipality, Uppsala County, Sweden, more commonly known as Mehedeby
- Mehedinţa, a commune in Romania now known as Podenii Noi
