= Lögde River =

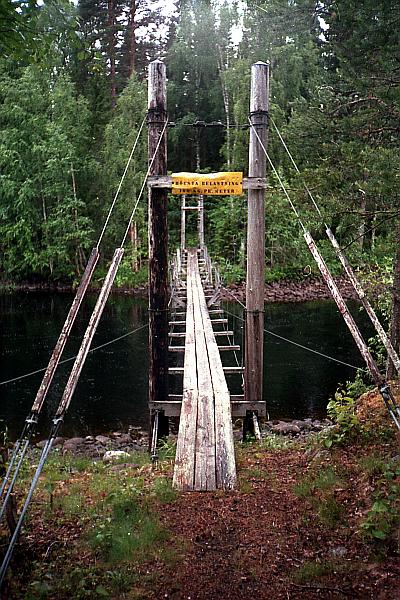
- Native name: Lögdeälven (Swedish)

Location
- Country: Sweden
- County: Västerbotten

Physical characteristics
- Mouth: Nordmalingsfjärden, Bothnian Sea
  - location: Rundvik, Nordmaling Municipality
  - coordinates: 63°33′N 19°27′E
- Length: 200 km (120 mi)
- Basin size: 1,608.2 km^{2} (620.9 sq mi)
- Discharge
  - average: 18 m^{3}/s (640 cu ft/s)

Lögde River (Swedish: Lögdeälven) is a river in Sweden.
