= Leduån =

Leduån Leån, Stensvattsbäcken
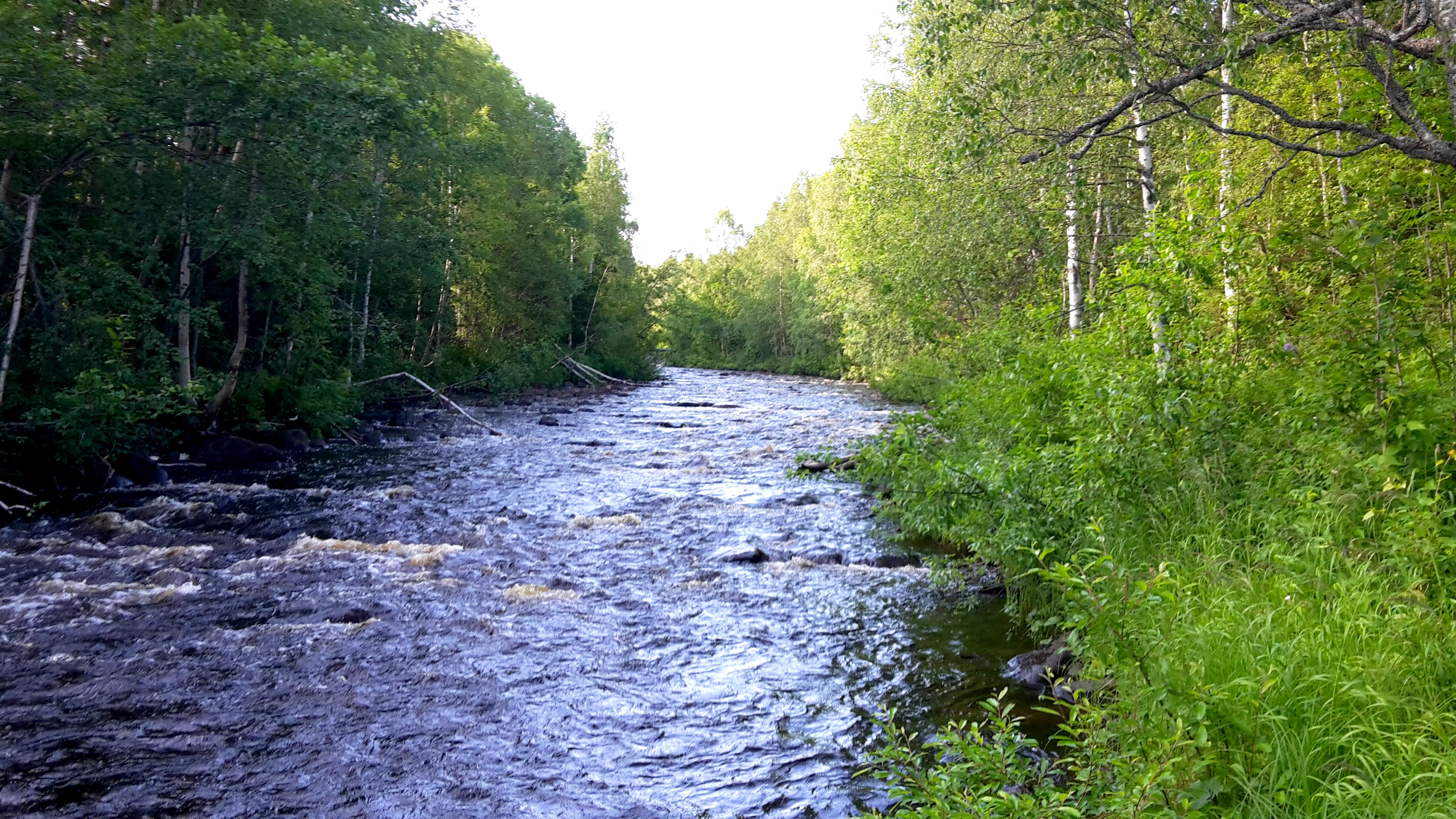

Location
- Country: Sweden
- County: Västerbotten
- Municipalities: Bjurholm, Nordmaling

Physical characteristics
- Mouth: Nordmalingsfjärden
  - location: Nordmaling Municipality
  - coordinates: 63°34′03″N 19°26′17″E
- Length: 60 km (37 mi)
- Basin size: 329.7 km^{2} (127.3 sq mi)

Leduån is a river in Sweden.
