= Mullsjö, Nordmaling Municipality =

Coordinates: 63.7028°N 19.7056°E

Mullsjö
- Location within Västerbotten Location within Sweden
- Country: Sweden
- Province: Ångermanland
- County: Västerbotten
- Municipality: Nordmaling

Population (31 December 2010)
  - Total: 76
  - Density: 2.11/km^{2} (5.5/sq mi)
- Time zone: UTC+1 (CET)
  - Summer (DST): UTC+2 (CEST)

Mullsjö is a minor locality in Nordmaling Municipality, Sweden. It had 76 inhabitants in 2010.
