= Timrå =

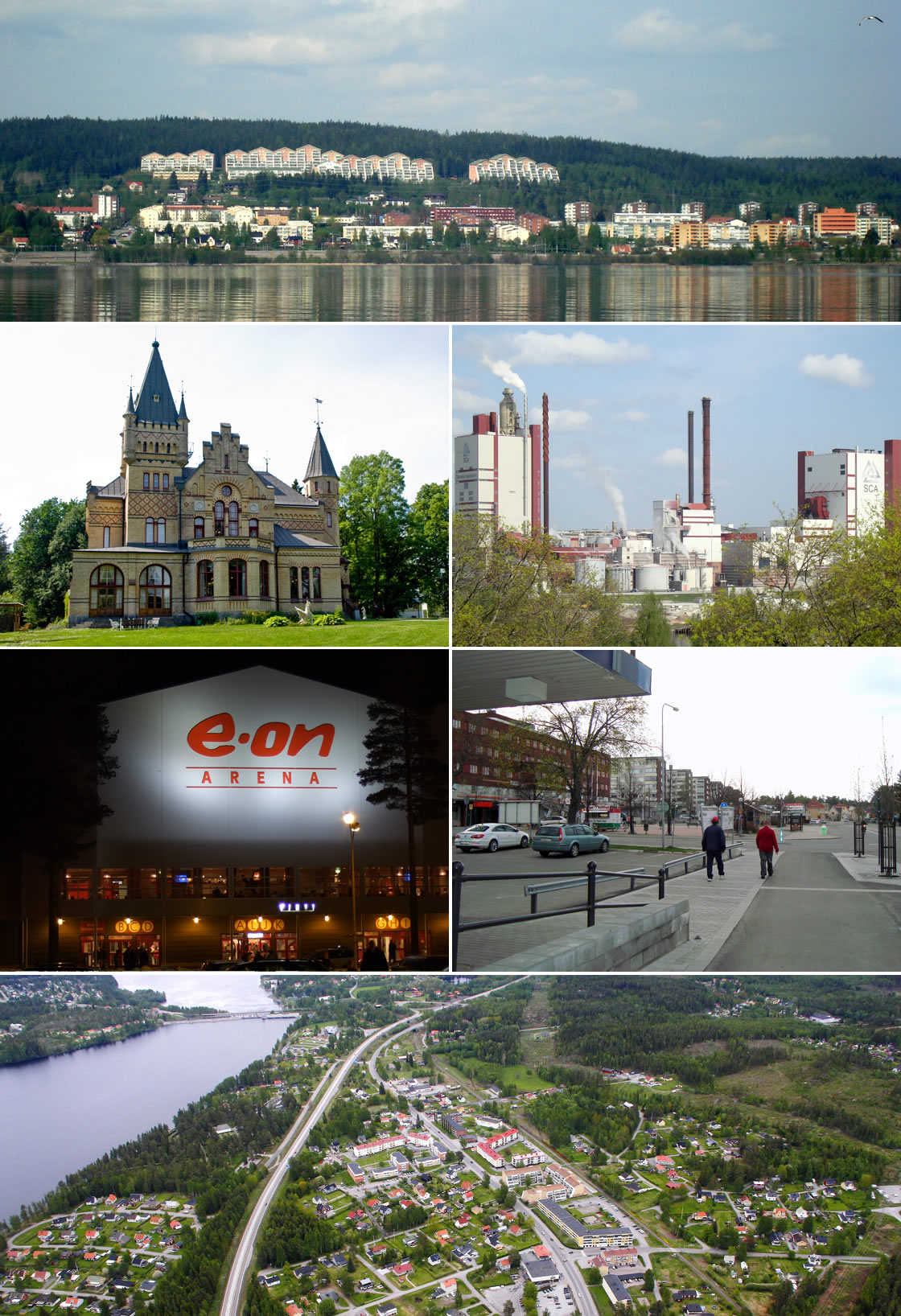
- Timrå montage, Top:Panorama view of downtown Timrå, from Alnön area, 2nd left:A native house and museum in Merlo Slotto, 2nd right:A headquarters in Östrands pulp (Östrands massafabrik), 3rd left:Sydkraft Arena (E.ON Arena), 3rd right:Köpmansgatan Square, Bottom:Aerial view over Sörberge with Indalsälven left and Fairhaven in the upper right corner

- Location within Västernorrland Location within Sweden
- Coordinates: 62°29′13″N 17°19′33″E
- Country: Sweden
- Province: Medelpad
- County: Västernorrland County
- Municipality: Timrå Municipality

Area
  - City: 12.03 km^{2} (4.64 sq mi)
  - Metro: 787.98 km^{2} (304.24 sq mi)
- Elevation: 19 m (62 ft)

Population (31 December 2010)
  - City: 10,443
  - Density: 868/km^{2} (2,250/sq mi)
  - Metro: 17,844
- Time zone: UTC+1 (CET)
  - Summer (DST): UTC+2 (CEST)
- Postal code: 860 xx
- Area code: (+46) 60
- Website: www.timra.se

Timrå is a locality and the seat of Timrå Municipality in Västernorrland County, Sweden with 10,443 inhabitants in 2010.

It is located about 13 km north of Sundsvall (a town with a metropolitan area of some 100,000 inhabitants), and could arguably be considered a satellite to that town.

The two closest cities (Sundsvall and Härnösand) share one airport, Midlanda, that is geographically located in Timrå.

Indalsälven, one of Sweden's largest rivers with a length of 430 km, meets the Gulf of Botnia in Timrå.

In Sweden, Timrå is mainly known for its ice hockey club Timrå IK, which, as of season 2023/24 plays in the Swedish top division SHL.

In 1995, Swedish artist Bengt Lindström constructed the Y:et, a 30 meter high sculpture, dedicated to the county's letter code Y.

== Climate ==
Timrå has historically had a subarctic climate, but it has in recent decades more resembled a cool-summer humid continental climate.

Climate data for Sundsvall Airport (2002–2021); extremes since 1943; sunshine 1961–1990
Month	Jan	Feb	Mar	Apr	May	Jun	Jul	Aug	Sep	Oct	Nov	Dec	Year
Record high °C (°F)	11.0 (51.8)	13.8 (56.8)	15.2 (59.4)	21.9 (71.4)	27.4 (81.3)	35.0 (95.0)	33.0 (91.4)	31.3 (88.3)	27.2 (81.0)	21.5 (70.7)	14.0 (57.2)	10.5 (50.9)	35.0 (95.0)
Mean maximum °C (°F)	5.3 (41.5)	6.8 (44.2)	11.5 (52.7)	16.8 (62.2)	22.2 (72.0)	25.7 (78.3)	27.8 (82.0)	26.0 (78.8)	21.1 (70.0)	14.5 (58.1)	8.8 (47.8)	6.7 (44.1)	28.8 (83.8)
Mean daily maximum °C (°F)	−2.5 (27.5)	−1.2 (29.8)	3.3 (37.9)	8.6 (47.5)	14.0 (57.2)	18.8 (65.8)	21.7 (71.1)	20.0 (68.0)	15.3 (59.5)	8.3 (46.9)	2.6 (36.7)	−0.6 (30.9)	9.0 (48.2)
Daily mean °C (°F)	−6.5 (20.3)	−5.6 (21.9)	−1.4 (29.5)	3.5 (38.3)	8.6 (47.5)	13.5 (56.3)	16.7 (62.1)	15.6 (60.1)	10.8 (51.4)	4.6 (40.3)	−0.4 (31.3)	−4.1 (24.6)	4.6 (40.3)
Mean daily minimum °C (°F)	−10.4 (13.3)	−10.0 (14.0)	−6.1 (21.0)	−1.7 (28.9)	3.2 (37.8)	8.2 (46.8)	11.7 (53.1)	10.6 (51.1)	6.2 (43.2)	0.8 (33.4)	−3.4 (25.9)	−7.6 (18.3)	0.1 (32.2)
Mean minimum °C (°F)	−22.5 (−8.5)	−21.5 (−6.7)	−17.4 (0.7)	−7.4 (18.7)	−3.0 (26.6)	2.3 (36.1)	6.1 (43.0)	4.5 (40.1)	−0.1 (31.8)	−6.4 (20.5)	−11.5 (11.3)	−16.8 (1.8)	−24.9 (−12.8)
Record low °C (°F)	−35.5 (−31.9)	−34.8 (−30.6)	−34.2 (−29.6)	−20.0 (−4.0)	−8.2 (17.2)	−2.0 (28.4)	1.9 (35.4)	−0.6 (30.9)	−7.7 (18.1)	−15.2 (4.6)	−22.1 (−7.8)	−36.6 (−33.9)	−36.6 (−33.9)
Average precipitation mm (inches)	56.1 (2.21)	31.7 (1.25)	30.5 (1.20)	27.6 (1.09)	43.3 (1.70)	46.9 (1.85)	58.8 (2.31)	72.5 (2.85)	59.6 (2.35)	63.6 (2.50)	51.0 (2.01)	59.1 (2.33)	600.7 (23.65)
Average extreme snow depth cm (inches)	38 (15)	45 (18)	43 (17)	23 (9.1)	0 (0)	0 (0)	0 (0)	0 (0)	0 (0)	0 (0)	9 (3.5)	22 (8.7)	52 (20)
Mean monthly sunshine hours	43	81	135	185	259	287	267	215	142	98	57	34	1,803
Source 1: SMHI Open Data for Sundsvall-Timrå flygplats, temperature
Source 2: SMHI Open Data for Stordala-Midlanda D, precipitation

== Notable citizens ==
- Lennart "Lillstrimma" Svedberg (1944–1972), ice hockey player
- Magdalena Forsberg (1967), cross country skier, biathlon
- Henrik Flyman, guitarist, composer, producer
- Henrik Forsberg (1967), cross country skier
- Mats Näslund (1959), ice hockey player
- Anna Olsson (1964), canoeist
- Anton Lander (1991), ice hockey player

== Gallery ==
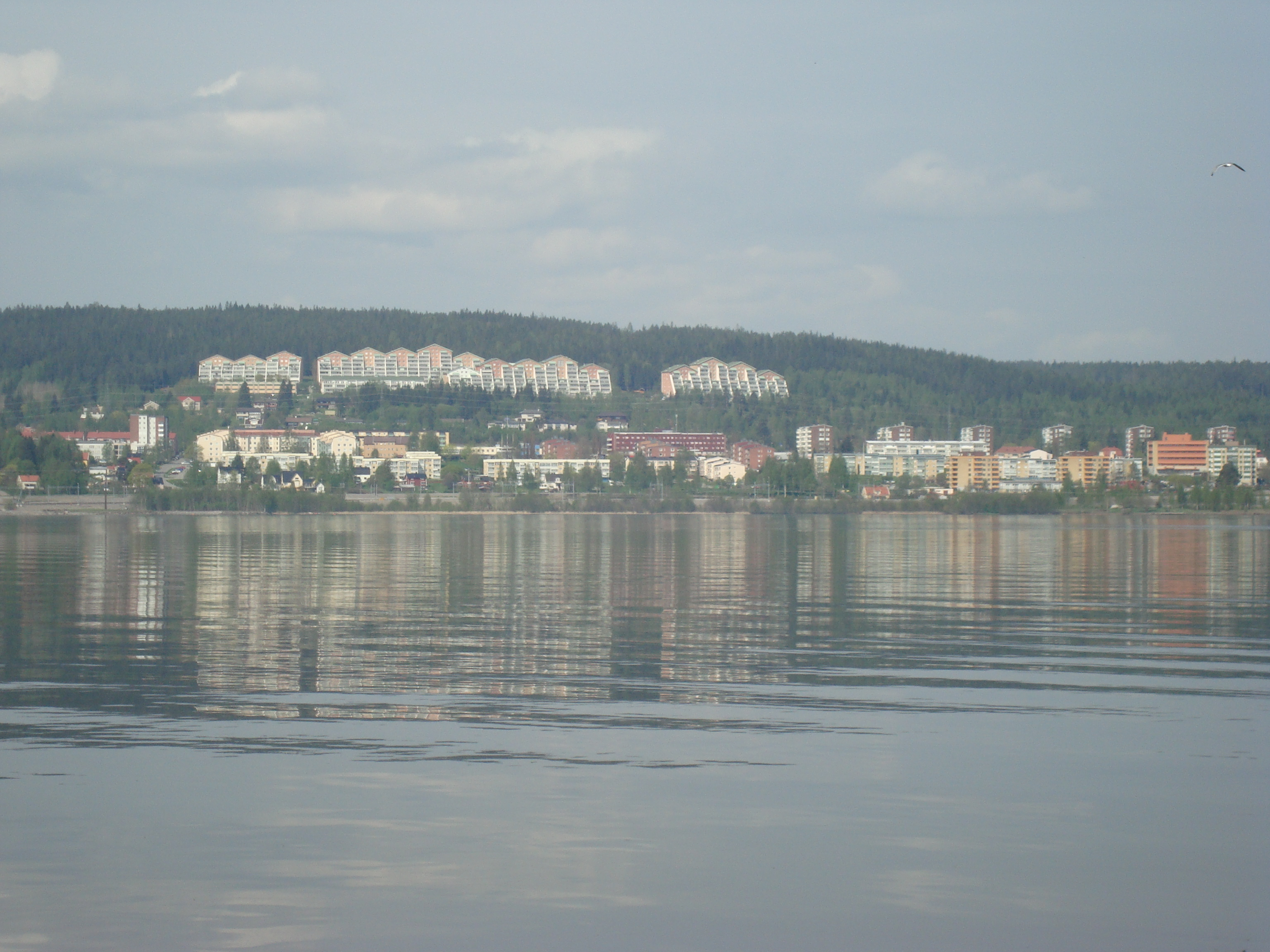
Timrå

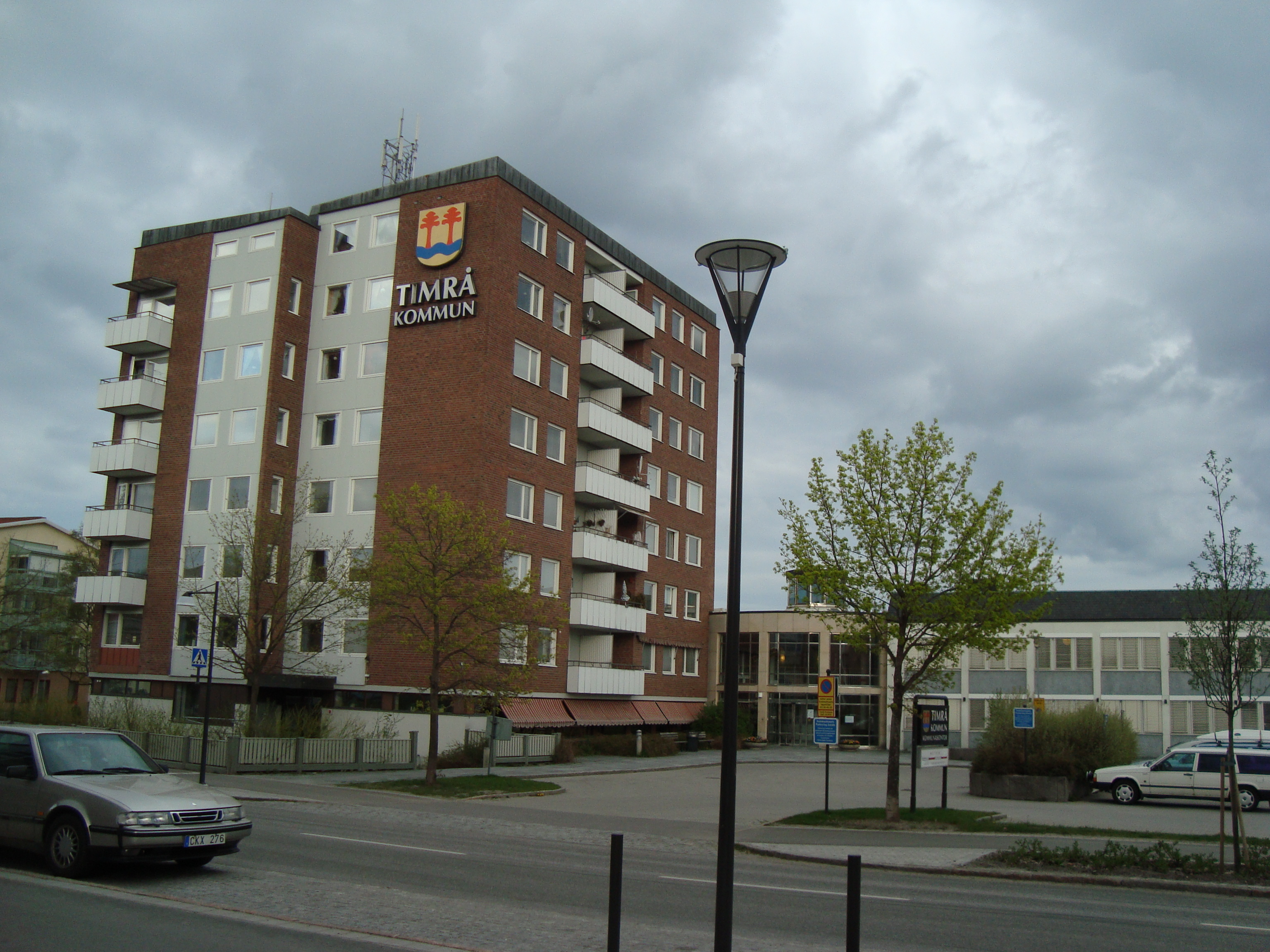
The municipal office

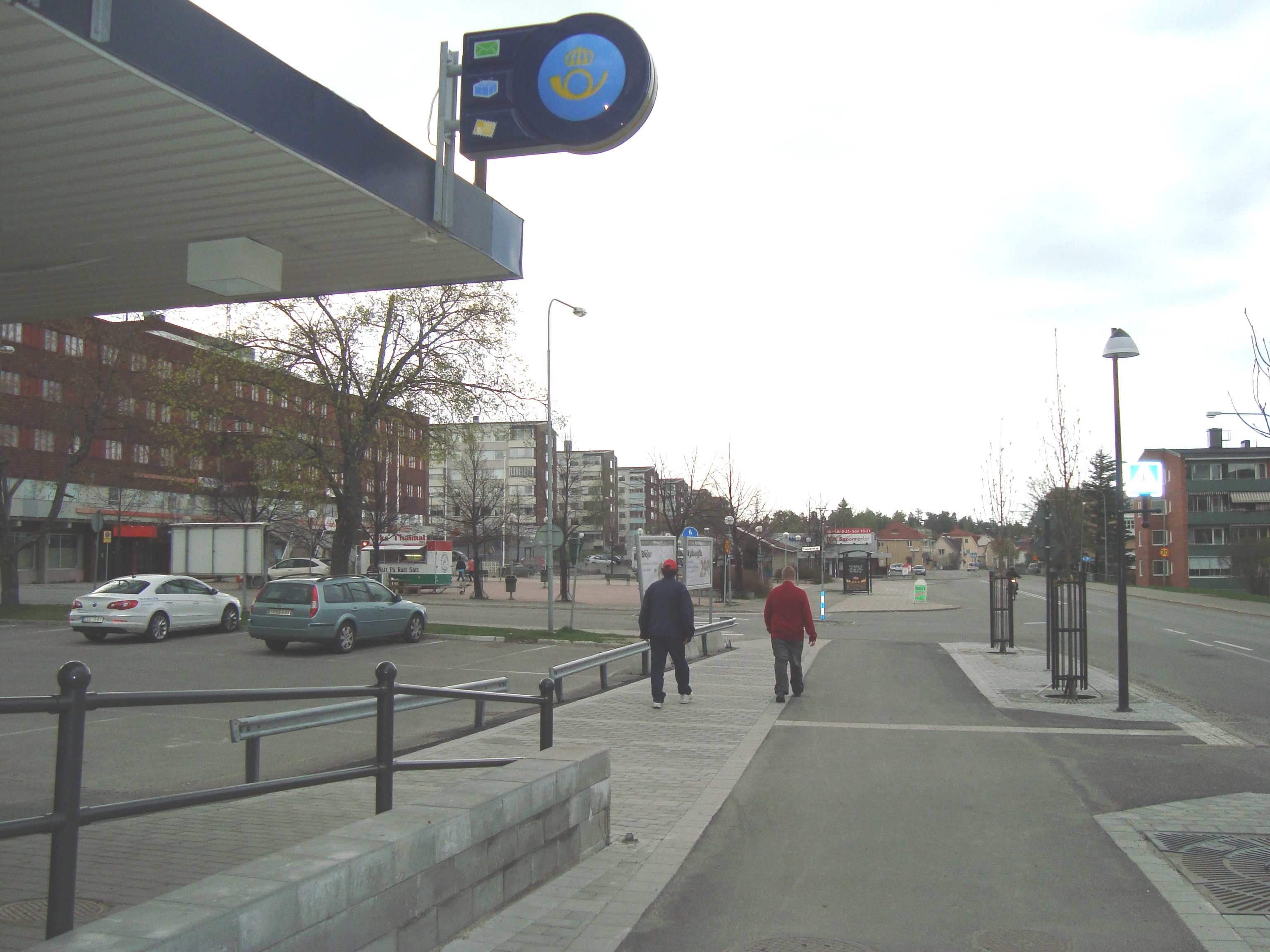
Town centre

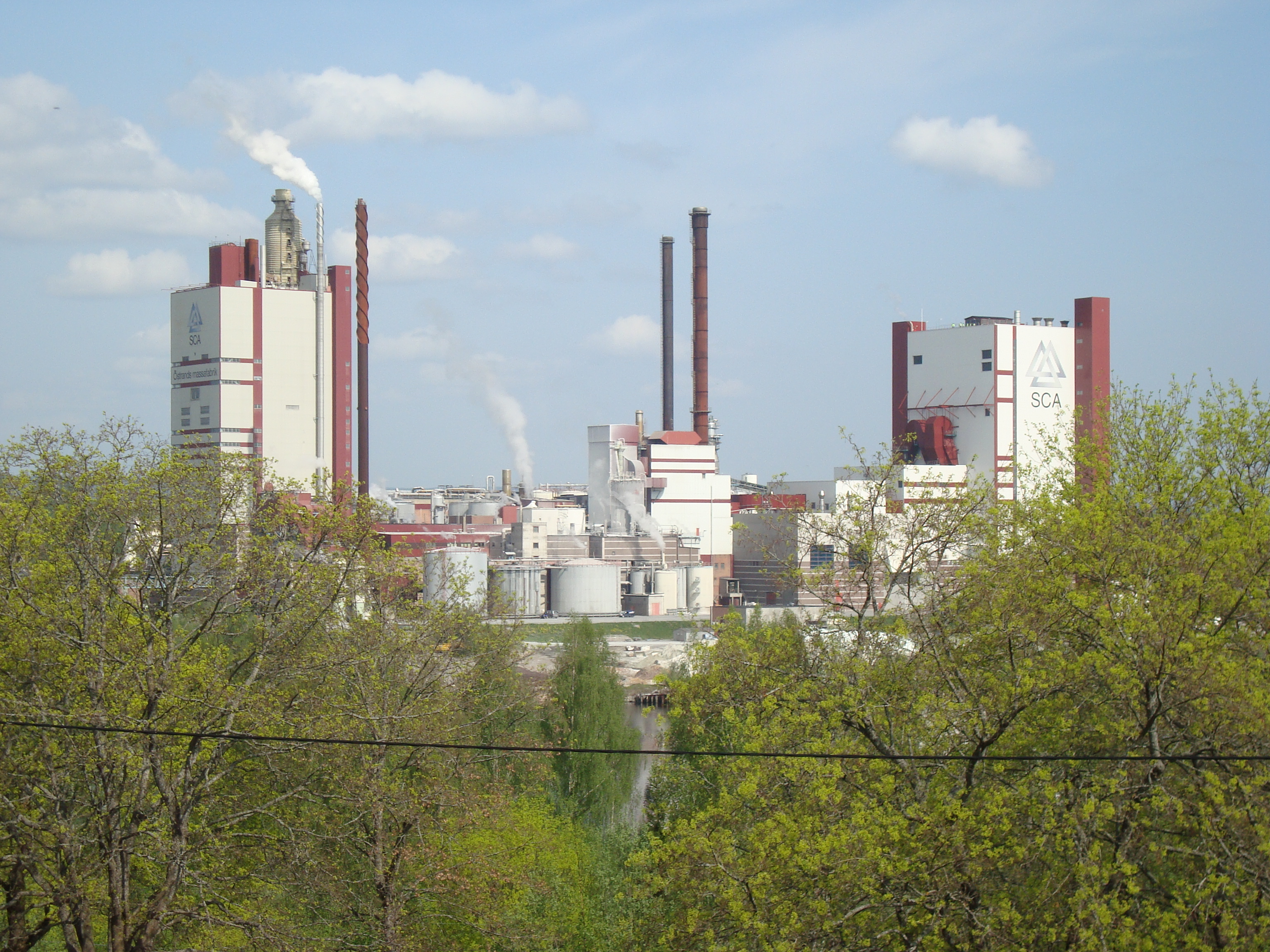
Östrand pulp mill
