= Lennart Svedberg =

Swedish ice hockey player

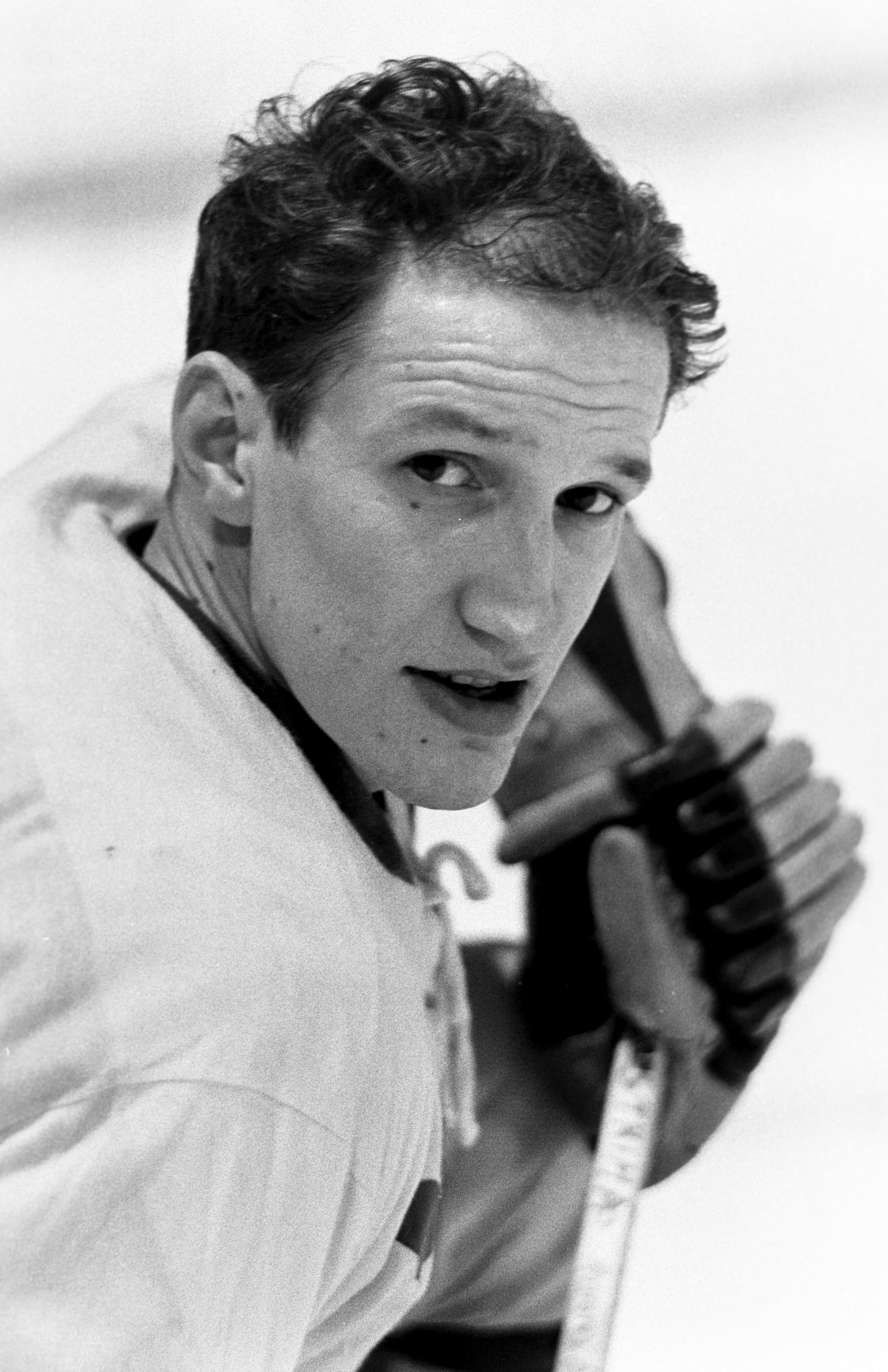
- Svedberg ca 1970
- Born: 29 February 1944 Östrand, Sweden
- Died: 29 July 1972 (aged 28) Sörberge, Sweden
- Height: 1.83 m (6 ft 0 in)
- Weight: 76 kg (168 lb; 12 st 0 lb)
- Position: Defence
- Shot: Right
- Played for: Wifsta/Östrands IF; Grums IK; Brynäs IF; Mora IK; Timrå IK
- National team: Sweden
- Playing career: 1959–1972

Jan Lennart "Lill-Strimma" Svedberg (29 February 1944 – 29 July 1972) was a Swedish ice hockey defenceman. He played for Timrå IK and Brynäs IF. He also played on the Swedish national team during six IIHF World Championships and the 1968 Winter Olympics. Svedberg was named best defenceman at the 1970 World Championships.

Svedberg died in a road accident outside of Timrå, Sweden, in July 1972, colliding with Leif Engvalls' tour-bus.

== See also ==
- List of ice hockey players who died during their playing careers

== Sources ==
- IIHF Directorate Awards
