= Stidsvig =

- Location within Skåne Location within Sweden
- Coordinates: 56°12′N 13°08′E
- Country: Sweden
- Province: Skåne
- County: Skåne County
- Municipality: Klippan Municipality

Area
  - Total: 1.18 km^{2} (0.46 sq mi)

Population (31 December 2010)
  - Total: 754
  - Density: 642/km^{2} (1,660/sq mi)
- Time zone: UTC+1 (CET)
  - Summer (DST): UTC+2 (CEST)

Stidsvig was a locality situated in Klippan Municipality, Skåne County, Sweden with 754 inhabitants in 2010. It lost its independent-locality status in 2015 due to merging with Östra Ljungby.
