= Norsholm =

- Location within Östergötland Location within Sweden
- Coordinates: 58°31′N 15°58′E
- Country: Sweden
- Province: Östergötland
- County: Östergötland County
- Municipality: Norrköping Municipality

Area
  - Total: 0.80 km^{2} (0.31 sq mi)

Population (31 December 2010)
  - Total: 615
  - Density: 769/km^{2} (1,990/sq mi)
- Time zone: UTC+1 (CET)
  - Summer (DST): UTC+2 (CEST)

Norsholm (Swedish pronunciation: [nɔʂˈhɔlm]) is a locality situated in Norrköping Municipality, Östergötland County, Sweden with 615 inhabitants in 2010. It lies around 15 kilometres southwest of Norrköping.

Norsholm lies on the E4 and Göta kanal. There are not many work places in the town, and most commute to Norrköping or Linköping.
