= Sörberge =

Village in Timrå Municipality, Sweden

Coordinates: 62°31′N 17°22′E

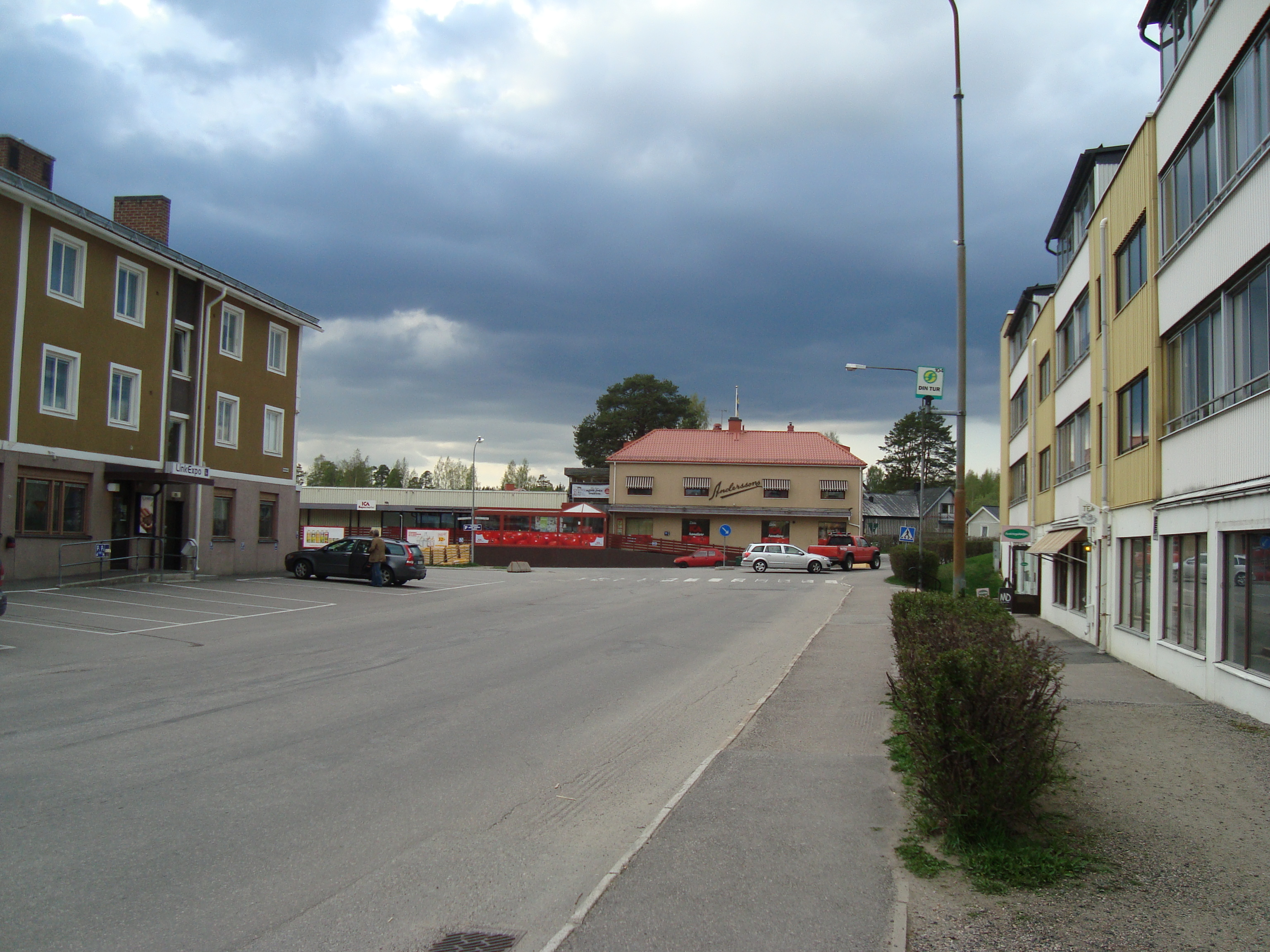
Central Sörberge in May 2010

Sörberge is a village in Timrå Municipality, Sweden.

The village has three schools, Böle skola for years 1–6, Sörbergeskolan for years 7–9, and Timrå Gymnasieskola for the secondary school level. The local Ice hockey team, Timrå Red Eagles, plays its home hames in the SCA Arena located between Sörbergskolan and Timrå Secondary School. There is an ICA grocery store, a clothes store, a bank, a hamburger restaurant, three pizza restaurants, and one filling station.

Sundsvall-Härnösand Airport (Midlanda Airport) is located between Söråker and Sörberge, so not in Härnösand nor in Sundsvall.
