= Niemisel =

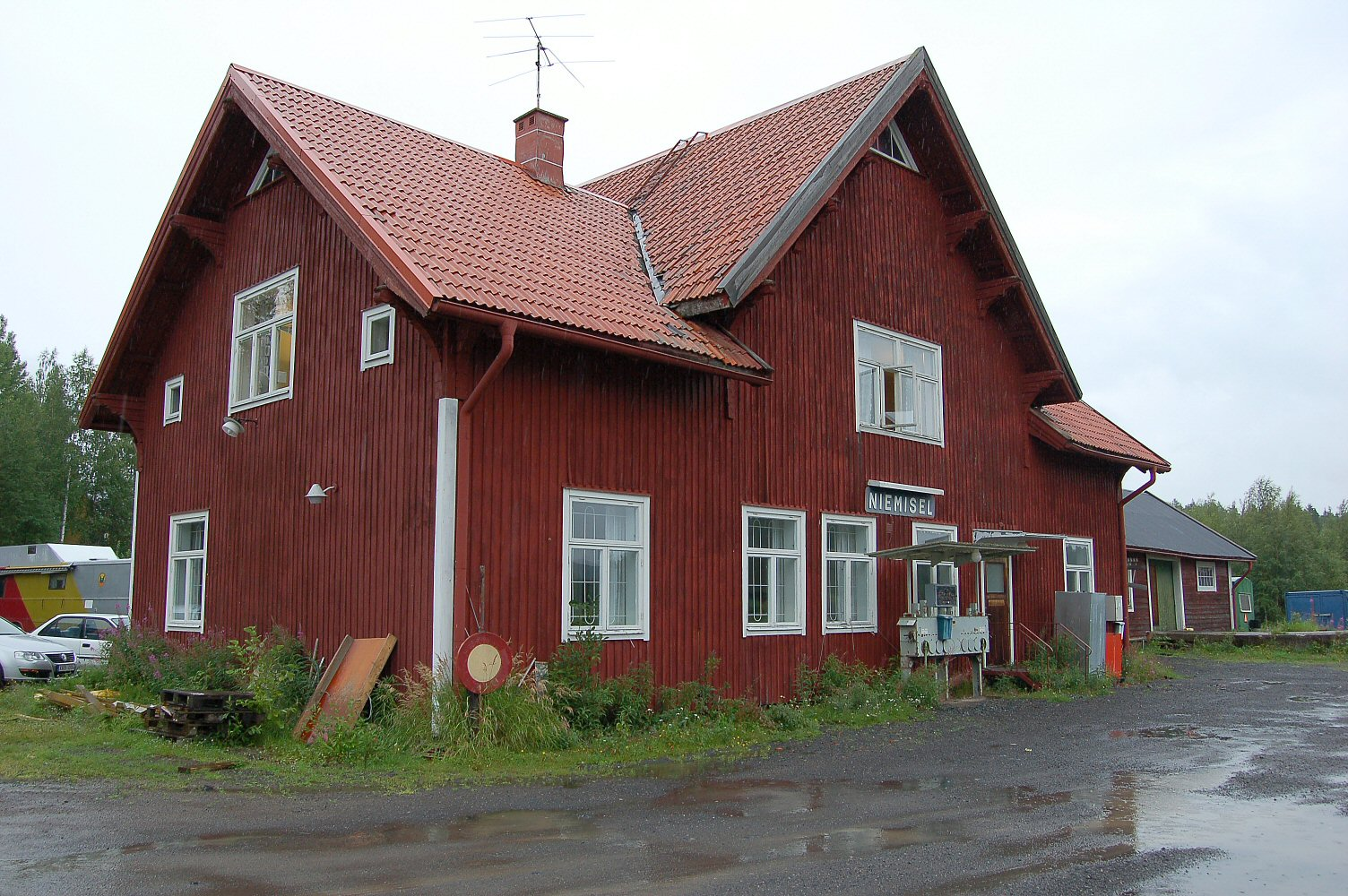
- Niemisel Railway Station

- Location within Sweden Location within Europe
- Coordinates: 66°01′08″N 21°59′14″E
- Country: Sweden
- Province: Norrbotten
- County: Norrbotten County
- Municipality: Luleå Municipality

Population (19 December 2015)
  - Total: 93
- Time zone: UTC+1 (CET)
  - Summer (DST): UTC+2 (CEST)

Niemisel (Swedish pronunciation: [nɪˈěːmɪseːl]) is a village with a population of 100 people in the north of Sweden, within Luleå Municipality. It is situated along the Råne river 60 km (35 mi) north of Luleå and 100 km (60 mi) south of the Arctic Circle.

== History ==
The remains of cooking pits and settlements to the north of Niemisel show that the village and its immediate area have been inhabited for over 2,000 years, during a period when the Bothnian Bay had a much higher water level than at present. The first farms in the village were built in the 16th century, and the population of the town grew steadily until the 1950s. Niemisel was connected to the Swedish railway system in 1905, with its station being inaugurated by King Gustaf V of Sweden.

== Transport ==
The Länsväg (county road) 356 passes near Niemisel. Niemisel railway system was inaugurated in 1905, and is used exclusively for freight. The railway station lies on the Boden-Haparanda line, and carries freight to both Tornio and Karlstad. The track is electrified and uses automatic block signalling.
