= Kasa, Sweden =

Village in northern Sweden

Coordinates: 63°20′N 19°04′E

Kasa is a medium-small village located in Örnsköldsvik Municipality in northern Sweden.
