= Nordmaling =

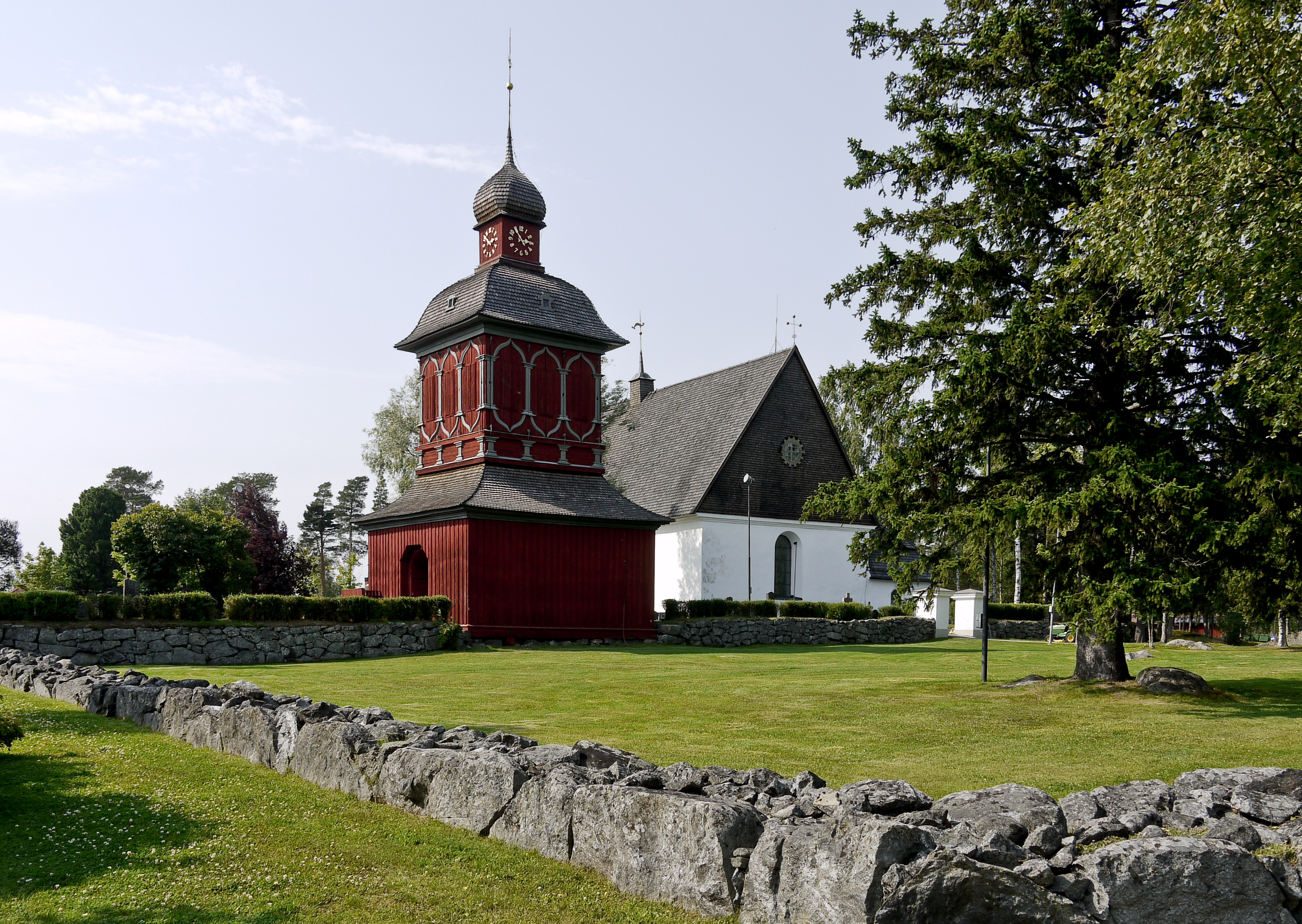
- Nordmaling Church in July 2010

- Location within Västerbotten Location within Sweden
- Coordinates: 63°34′N 19°30′E
- Country: Sweden
- Province: Ångermanland
- County: Västerbotten County
- Municipality: Nordmaling Municipality

Area
  - Total: 3.08 km^{2} (1.19 sq mi)

Population (31 December 2010)
  - Total: 2,546
  - Density: 826/km^{2} (2,140/sq mi)
- Time zone: UTC+1 (CET)
  - Summer (DST): UTC+2 (CEST)

Nordmaling is a locality and the seat of Nordmaling Municipality in Västerbotten County, Sweden, with 2,546 inhabitants in 2010.
