= Lunde, Sweden =

Lunde
- Location within Västernorrland Location within Sweden
- Coordinates: 62°53′N 17°52′E
- Country: Sweden
- Province: Ångermanland
- County: Västernorrland County
- Municipality: Kramfors Municipality

Area
  - Total: 1.37 km^{2} (0.53 sq mi)

Population (31 December 2010)
  - Total: 399
  - Density: 292/km^{2} (760/sq mi)
- Time zone: UTC+1 (CET)
  - Summer (DST): UTC+2 (CEST)
- Climate: Dfb

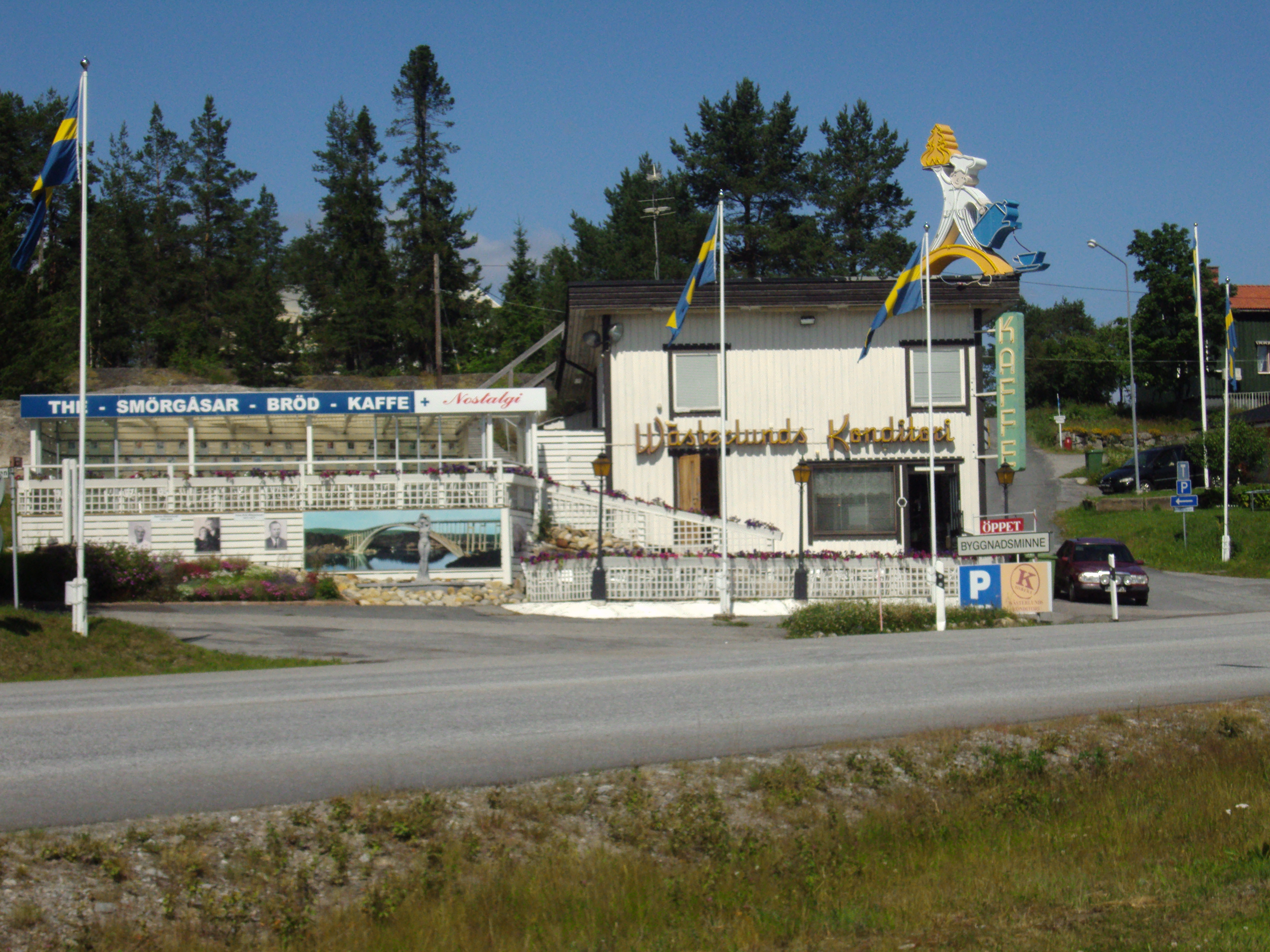

Lunde is a locality situated in Kramfors Municipality, Västernorrland County, Sweden with 399 inhabitants in 2010.
