= Gävle–Sandviken Airport =

Gävle–Sandviken Airport Gestrike Airport
- IATA: GVX; ICAO: ESSK

Summary
- Serves: Gävle, Sandviken
- Opened: 1971
- Passenger services ceased: 2000
- Coordinates: 60°35′40″N 16°57′04″E
- Interactive map of Gävle–Sandviken Airport

Runways
| Direction | Length | | Surface |
| Direction | ft | m | Surface |
|---|---|---|---|
| 18/36 | 6,600 | 2,000 | asphalt |

Gävle–Sandviken Airport, also called Gestrike Airport, is a public airport in Sweden, with a single runway 2,000 metres (6,600 ft) long and 45 metres (148 ft) wide. The taxiway is 200 metres (660 ft) long and 15 metres (49 ft) wide. The airport is used for taxi flights, ambulance flights, photo flights for Lantmäteriet (Swedish National Land Survey), and private planes. The airport sells jet fuel from 8:00 am to 4:00 pm CET.

== History ==
Gävle Airport was built and opened in 1971 for Sweden's military. Between 1971 and 2000, there was scheduled passenger traffic to Stockholm. There has also been traffic to Gothenburg and some charter destinations. The traffic was never really profitable, and better roads and railways have taken over the traffic. In 1999, Sweden's defense ministry transferred ownership and responsibility of the airport to the Gävle municipality.

== Flying Clubs ==
Three flying clubs operate out of Gävle Airport: Gavle District's Flying Club, Valbo Flying Club, and Western Gastrikeleden Flying Club. Additionally, Wermlandsflyg Operations AB has operated a flying shop in Gävle Airport since 2015.
