= Sundsvall–Timrå Airport =

Sundsvall–Timrå Airport Sundsvall-Timrå flygplats

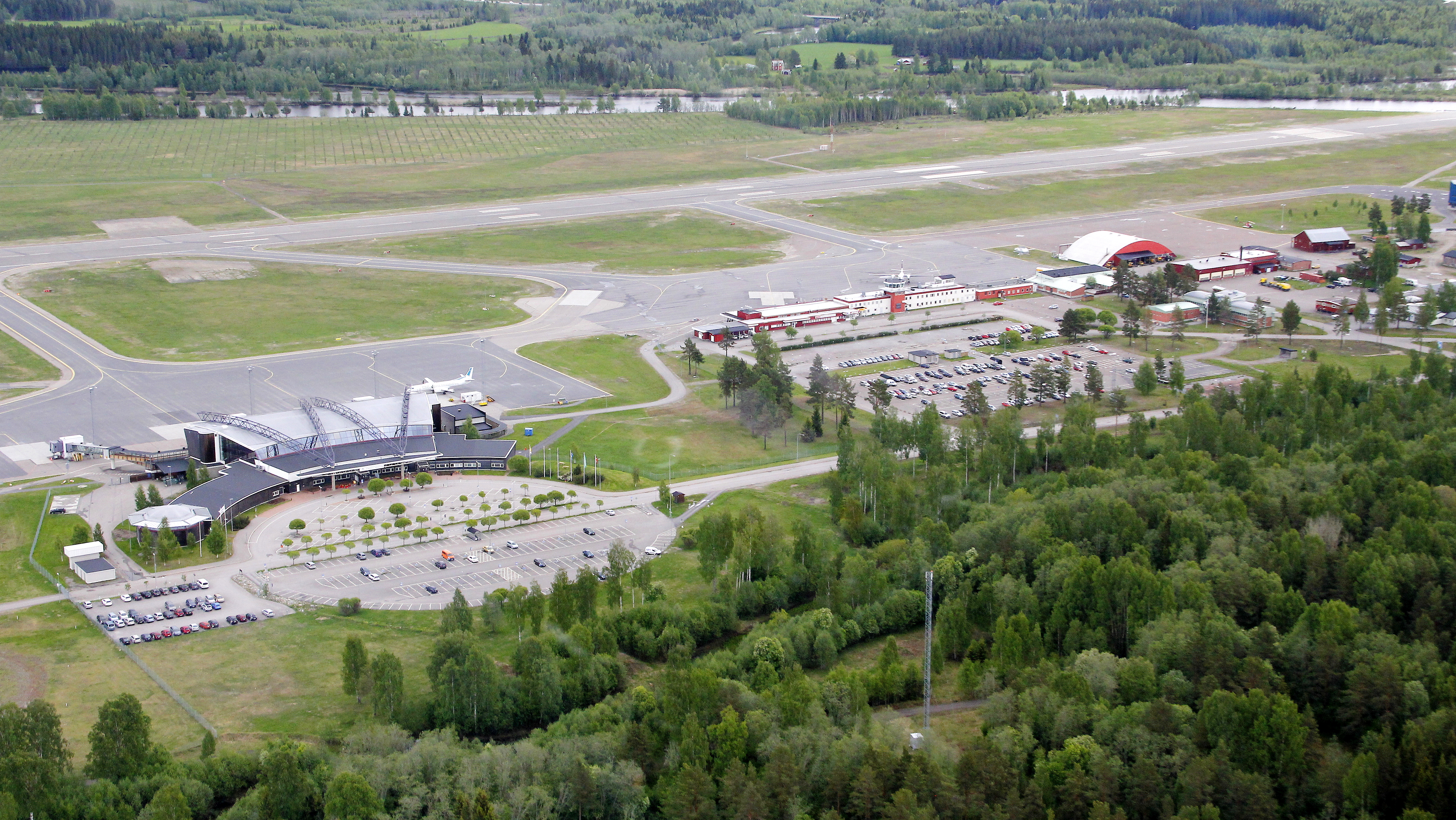
- IATA: SDL; ICAO: ESNN

Summary
- Airport type: Public
- Owner: Municipalities of Sundsvall and Timrå
- Operator: Midlanda Flygplats AB
- Location: Timrå, but mainly serves Sundsvall and Härnösand, Sweden
- Opened: 11 September 1944
- Elevation AMSL: 16 ft / 5 m
- Coordinates: 62°31′41″N 17°26′38″E
- Website: www.sdlairport.se

Map
- Location of airport in Västernorrland SDL (Sweden)

Runways
Direction	Length		Surface
Direction	ft	m	Surface
16/34	6,857	2,090	Asphalt

Statistics (2018)
- Passengers total: 273,527
- International passengers: 30,481
- Domestic passengers: 243,046
- Landings total: 4,074

Sundsvall–Timrå Airport (IATA: SDL, ICAO: ESNN) is about 21 km north of Sundsvall, 8 km east of Timrå and 32 km south of Härnösand, Sweden. The airport is also known as Midlanda, referring to its geographically central location in Sweden. It is Norrland's sixth-busiest airport and Sweden's fifteenth busiest.

== History ==
The airport was built on delta land formed by much sediment and flood debris that washed down the Indalsälven river to the sea when the lake Ragundasjön drained suddenly and catastrophically in June 1796. The airport was inaugurated on 11 September 1944.

The airport was known under the name Sundsvall–Härnösand Airport until the municipalities of Sundsvall and Timrå (but not Härnösand) obtained the ownership of the airport from Swedavia in June 2013.

In 2016, Sundsvall airport had Sweden's first centre for remote control towers. Four airports have their ground movements controlled from an office building with camera view only. These four airports are Örnsköldsvik, Linköping, Sälen and Sundsvall itself. The airport counted 282,047 passengers in 2011 and 273,527 in 2018.

== Airlines and destinations ==
=== Passenger ===
The following airlines operate regular scheduled and charter flights at Sundsvall–Timrå Airport:

Airlines	Destinations
Scandinavian Airlines	Stockholm–Arlanda
TUI fly Nordic	Seasonal charter: Gran Canaria (begins 25 October 2026)

=== Cargo ===
Airlines	Destinations
PopulAir	Malmö, Stockholm–Arlanda, Umeå
West Air Sweden	Stockholm-Arlanda

== Accidents and incidents ==
- On 12 December 1999, a Piper PA-31 Navajo crashed shortly after takeoff. It hit a hill in bad visibility. All eight onboard died (pilot and seven passengers). This was not a regular flight, but a taxi flight with paying passengers.

== See also ==
- List of the largest airports in the Nordic countries
