= Sikeå =

Coordinates: 64°10′00.13″N 20°55′55.89″E

Sikeå is a locality situated in Robertsfors Municipality, Västerbotten County, Sweden. It is situated 4 km from Robertsfors. Along with the nearby locality, Legdeå, the area has a total population of 360 residents. Sikeå has a camping for caravans, a handball team in division 1 north (Sikeå SK). It also has the smallest fire station in Sweden.
