= Lögdeå =

- Location within Västerbotten Location within Sweden
- Coordinates: 63°32′N 19°24′E
- Country: Sweden
- Province: Ångermanland
- County: Västerbotten County
- Municipality: Nordmaling Municipality

Area
  - Total: 1.16 km^{2} (0.45 sq mi)

Population (31 December 2010)
  - Total: 394
  - Density: 341/km^{2} (880/sq mi)
- Time zone: UTC+1 (CET)
  - Summer (DST): UTC+2 (CEST)

Lögdeå is a locality situated in Nordmaling Municipality, Västerbotten County, Sweden. It had a population of 394 inhabitants in 2010 and covers an area of 116 hectares.
