= Ostvik =

- Location within Västerbotten Location within Sweden
- Coordinates: 64°53′N 21°04′E
- Country: Sweden
- Province: Västerbotten
- County: Västerbotten County
- Municipality: Skellefteå Municipality

Area
  - Total: 0.73 km^{2} (0.28 sq mi)

Population (31 December 2010)
  - Total: 387
  - Density: 528/km^{2} (1,370/sq mi)
- Time zone: UTC+1 (CET)
  - Summer (DST): UTC+2 (CEST)

Ostvik is a locality situated in Skellefteå Municipality, Västerbotten County, Sweden with 387 inhabitants in 2010.

Ostvik has had a substantial amount of secret military installations for its size, from secret underground bunkers to different kind of radar stations. Today there is barely anything left, but the memories still live on among the older residents.
