= Berg, Linköping =

Berg
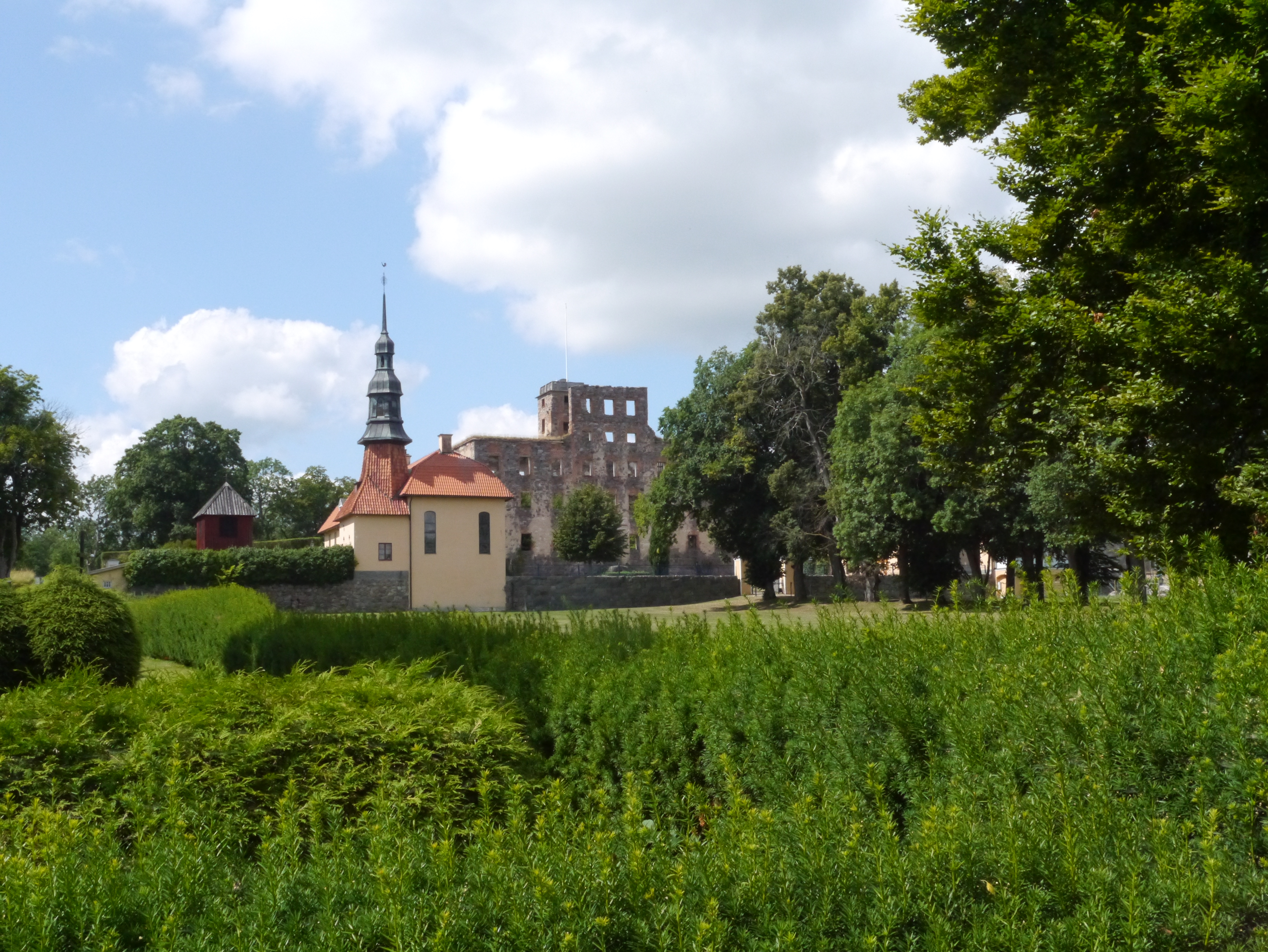

- Location within Östergötland Location within Sweden
- Coordinates: 58°29′23″N 15°31′50″E
- Country: Sweden
- Province: Östergötland
- County: Östergötland County
- Municipality: Linköping Municipality

Area
  - Total: 1.09 km^{2} (0.42 sq mi)

Population (31 December 2010)
  - Total: 1,278
  - Density: 1,169/km^{2} (3,030/sq mi)
- Time zone: UTC+1 (CET)
  - Summer (DST): UTC+2 (CEST)

Berg is a locality in Linköping Municipality, Östergötland County, Sweden with 1,278 inhabitants in 2010.

It is home to the Stjärnorp Castle.

== Society ==
The Göta Canal flows through Berg, which gave creation to a system of locks called Bergs slussar. In the meeting point of the canal with the lake Roxen there is a bathing spot with a grill. Just a bit south of Berg lies the Vreta Abbey, which was the first nunnery in Sweden.
