= Jävre =

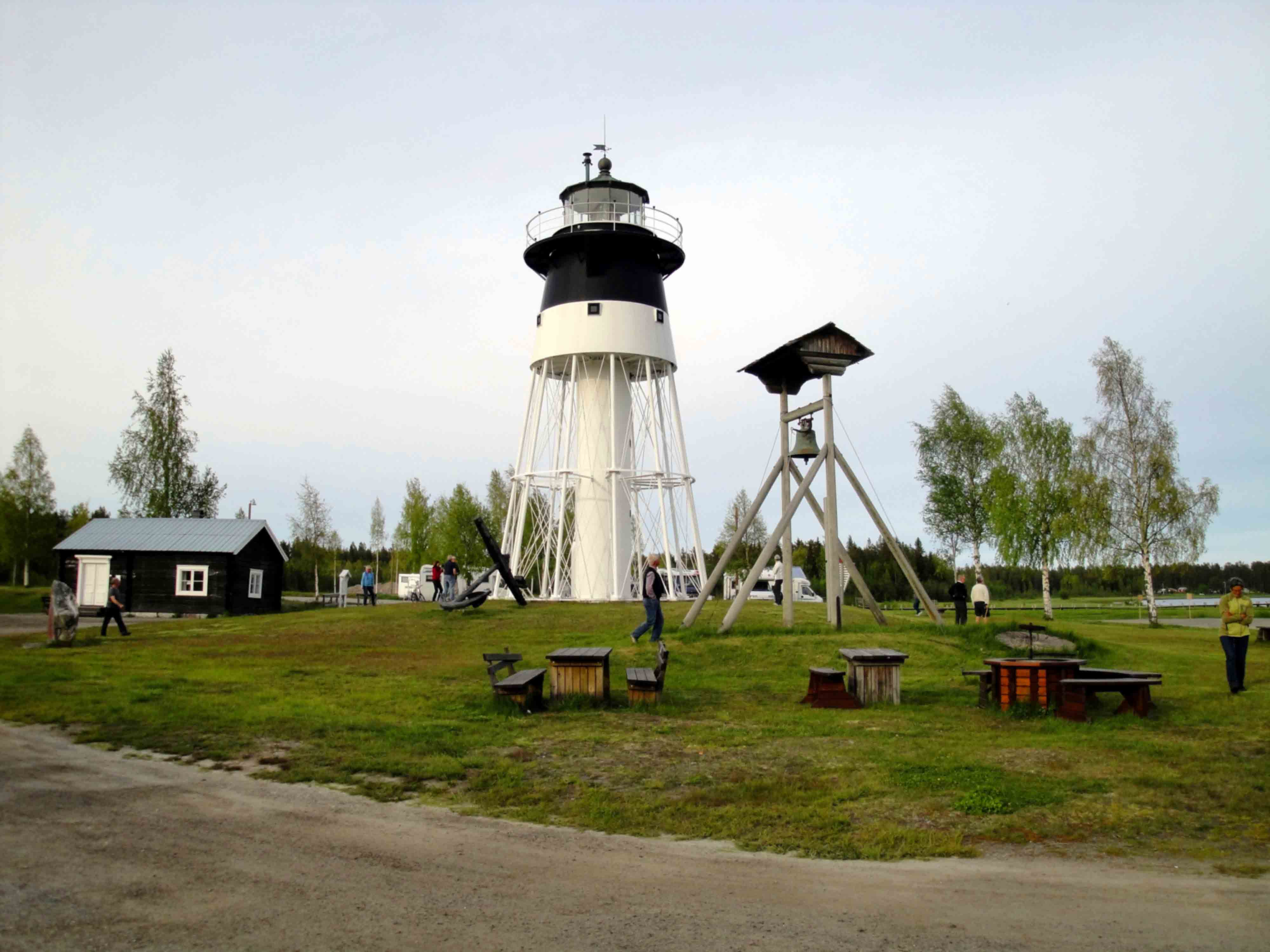

- Location within Norrbotten Location within Sweden
- Coordinates: 65°09′N 21°29′E
- Country: Sweden
- Province: Norrbotten
- County: Norrbotten County
- Municipality: Piteå Municipality

Area
  - Total: 1.81 km^{2} (0.70 sq mi)

Population (31 December 2010)
  - Total: 576
  - Density: 318/km^{2} (820/sq mi)
- Time zone: UTC+1 (CET)
  - Summer (DST): UTC+2 (CEST)

Jävre is a locality in Piteå Municipality, Norrbotten County, Sweden, with 576 inhabitants in 2010.
