= Söderhamn Airport =

Söderhamn Airport Söderhamns flygplats
- IATA: SOO; ICAO: ESNY

Summary
- Owner: Söderhamn Municipality
- Operator: Flygstaden AB
- Elevation AMSL: 88 ft / 27 m
- Coordinates: 61°15′41″N 017°05′54″E
- Website: http://www.flygstaden.se/flygf-ltet (In Swedish)
- Interactive map of Söderhamn Airport

Runways
Direction	Length		Surface
Direction	ft	m	Surface
12/30		2.524	Asphalt
03/21		1.500	Asphalt (Closed)
- Sources: svenskaflygplatser.com, skyvector.com, iata.org

Söderhamn Airport (IATA: SOO, ICAO: ESNY), also known as Helsinge Airport (Swedish: Söderhamns flygplats), is a former airport in Söderhamn, Sweden. Use of the airport is still possible with prior permission required (PPR).

== See also ==
- List of the largest airports in the Nordic countries
