= Strömsfors =

- Location within Östergötland Location within Sweden
- Coordinates: 58°41′N 16°20′E
- Country: Sweden
- Province: Östergötland
- County: Östergötland County
- Municipality: Norrköping Municipality

Area
  - Total: 0.82 km^{2} (0.32 sq mi)

Population (31 December 2010)
  - Total: 528
  - Density: 647/km^{2} (1,680/sq mi)
- Time zone: UTC+1 (CET)
  - Summer (DST): UTC+2 (CEST)

Salvation army in Strömsfors, Norrköping Municipality, Sweden

Strömsfors (Swedish pronunciation: [strœmsˈfɔʂː]) is a locality situated in Norrköping Municipality, Östergötland County, Sweden with 528 inhabitants in 2010.
