= Bergeforsen =

- Location within Västernorrland Location within Sweden
- Coordinates: 62°31′N 17°23′E
- Country: Sweden
- Province: Medelpad
- County: Västernorrland County
- Municipality: Timrå Municipality

Area
  - Total: 1.98 km^{2} (0.76 sq mi)

Population (31 December 2010)
  - Total: 1,563
  - Density: 788/km^{2} (2,040/sq mi)
- Time zone: UTC+1 (CET)
  - Summer (DST): UTC+2 (CEST)

Bergeforsen is a locality situated in Timrå Municipality, Västernorrland County, Sweden with 1,563 inhabitants in 2010.
