= Timrå Municipality =

Timrå Municipality Timrå kommun
- Municipality
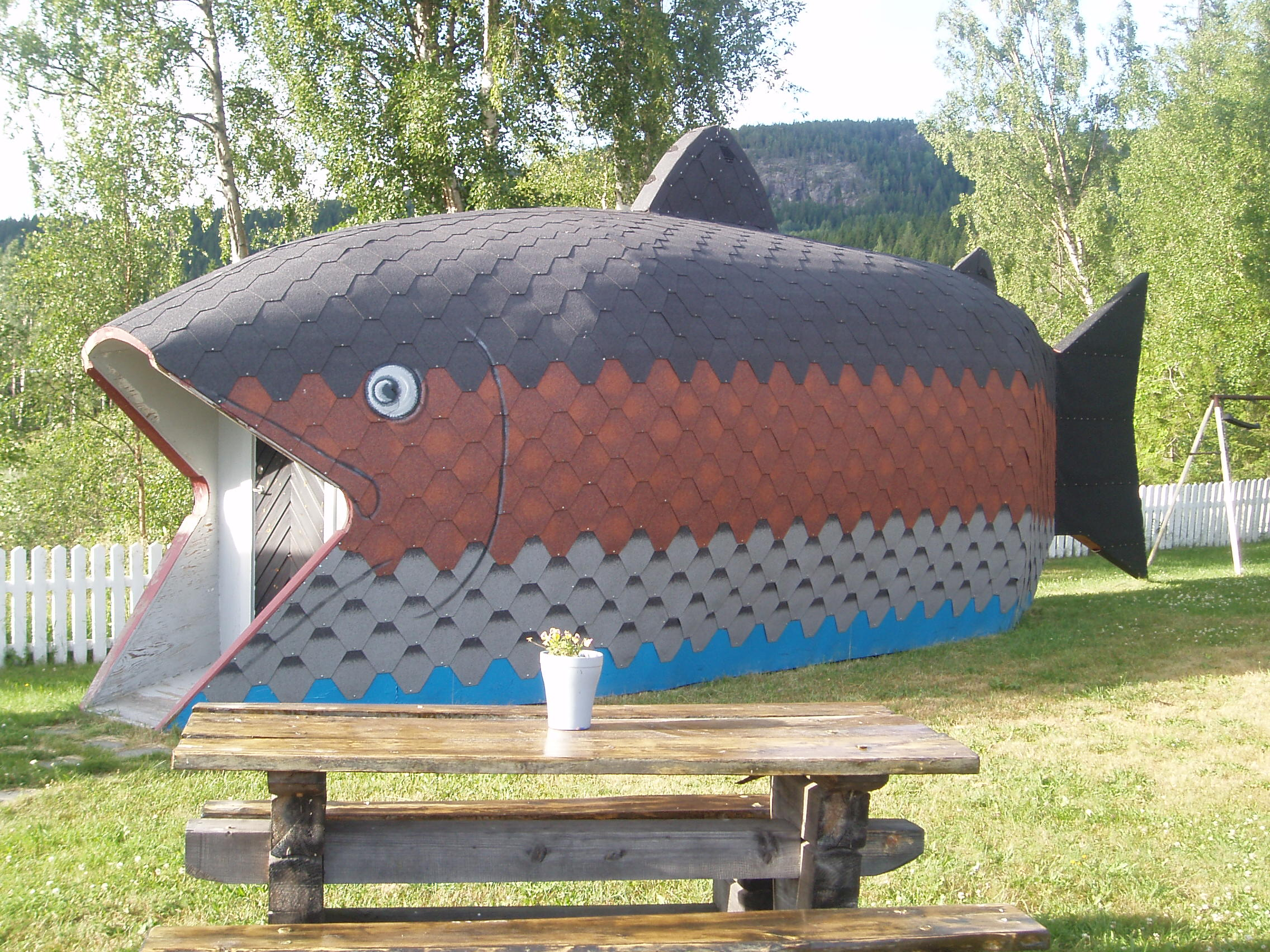
- Tourist information fish at Björkängen, Ljustorp

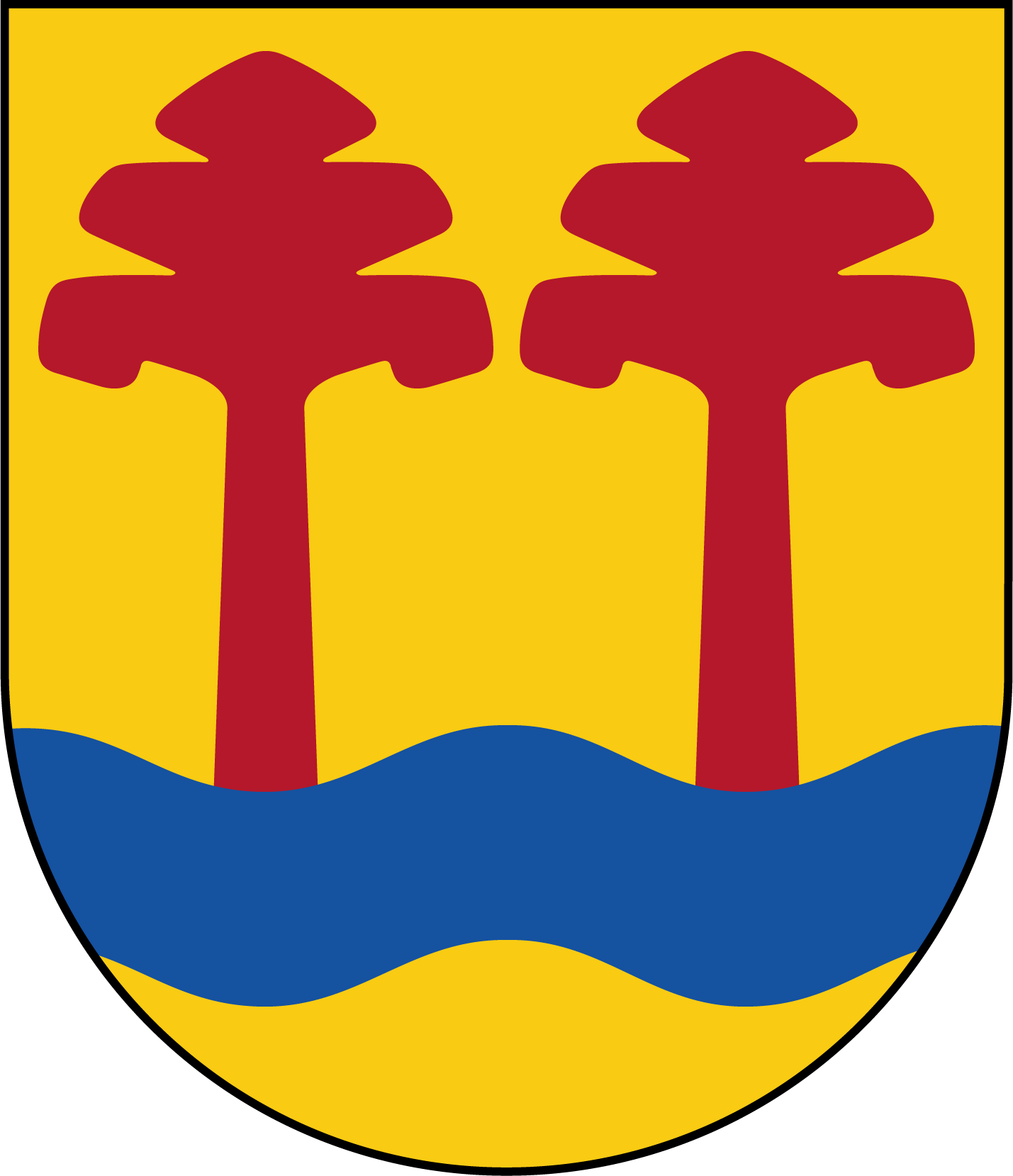
- Flag Coat of arms

- Coordinates: 62°30′N 17°20′E
- Country: Sweden
- County: Västernorrland County
- Seat: Timrå

Area
  - Total: 1,234.17 km^{2} (476.52 sq mi)
  - Land: 783.3 km^{2} (302.4 sq mi)
  - Water: 450.87 km^{2} (174.08 sq mi)
- Area as of 1 January 2014.

Population (30 June 2025)
  - Total: 17,548
  - Density: 22.40/km^{2} (58.02/sq mi)
- Time zone: UTC+1 (CET)
  - Summer (DST): UTC+2 (CEST)
- ISO 3166 code: SE
- Province: Medelpad
- Municipal code: 2262

Timrå Municipality (Swedish: Timrå kommun) is a municipality in Västernorrland County, Sweden. The town of Timrå is the municipal seat.

The rural municipality Timrå was made a market town (köping) in 1947. The present municipality was created in 1971 when Timrå was amalgamated with Hässjö.

== Geography ==
Timrå is located in a terrain of forest and hills. Traditionally the industry has been dominated by forestry. The timber was transported through the rivers and streams to their destination, most often to sawmills. In tribute to this, the city arms depicts trees and water.

=== Localities ===
- Bergeforsen
- Stavreviken
- Söråker
- Sörberge
- Timrå (seat)

== Demographics ==
This is a demographic table based on Timrå Municipality's electoral districts in the 2022 Swedish general election sourced from SVT's election platform, in turn taken from SCB official statistics.

In total there were 17,904 residents, including 13,943 Swedish citizens of voting age. 53.2% voted for the left coalition and 45.9% for the right coalition. Indicators are in percentage points except population totals and income.

Location	Residents	Citizen adults	Left vote	Right vote	Employed	Swedish parents	Foreign heritage	Income SEK	Degree
Location			%	%					
Ala	1,125	887	46.5	52.1	84	94	6	27,082	31
Bergeforsen	1,891	1,435	47.4	52.2	86	94	6	28,674	33
Böle	1,973	1,499	58.1	41.0	88	91	9	29,248	38
Centrum	1,859	1,638	64.3	34.8	71	77	23	19,989	24
Ljustorp	970	760	50.3	48.8	84	93	7	24,703	27
Nyvista	1,669	1,145	57.1	41.6	67	69	31	20,904	22
Sörberge	1,879	1,469	52.1	47.1	85	90	10	26,951	35
Söråker	2,108	1,598	52.0	47.1	81	92	8	24,727	36
Timrådalen	1,949	1,489	48.5	50.8	86	89	11	27,873	52
Tynderö	756	653	49.7	49.4	83	95	5	26,494	36
Vivsta	1,725	1,370	56.4	42.8	78	82	18	23,133	27
Source: SVT

== Notable citizens ==
- Lennart Svedberg (1944-1972), ice hockey player
- Magdalena Forsberg (1967), cross country skier, biathlete
- Henrik Flyman, guitarist, composer, producer
- Henrik Forsberg (1967), cross country skier
