= Öjebyn =

Neighborhood of Piteå, Sweden

Coordinates: 65°20′45″N 21°24′19″E

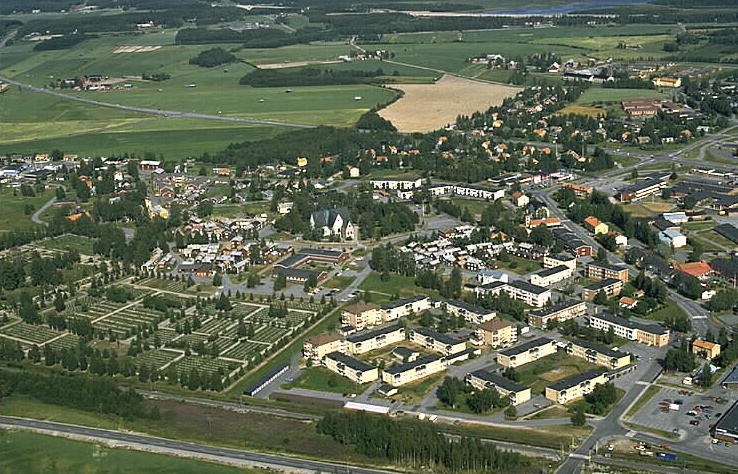
1994 aerial photograph

Öjebyn is a residential area and a neighborhood in the town of Piteå, Sweden, and was the town center of Piteå from the 15th century to the 17th century. Öjebyn is also the church town in the Piteå parish.

== History ==
Piteå has had three town centers in its history. A settlement, Gamla Kyrkbyn ("old church village"), with a church and market, was established about 12 kilometers (7.5 mi) up the Pite River in 1320s. The church burned in the early 15th century; rather than rebuild at the same site, the new church was built on an island further downstream. A settlement developed around this second church as well, and became Öjebyn. Trade was carried out from Öjebyn to the Sami people in Pite Lapland. In 1620, Olof Bure made the city plan for Piteå at Öjebyn. The first cityscape was triangular with the church in the center. Piteå was granted the rights of a city in 1621, and the main town moved to Öjebyn. In July 1666, however, most of Öjebyn was itself destroyed by a fire. Over the next 10 years, a new main city was built on the island of Häggholmen, just off the mouth of the Pite River, and this, rather than Öjebyn, has remained the Piteå city center into modern times.

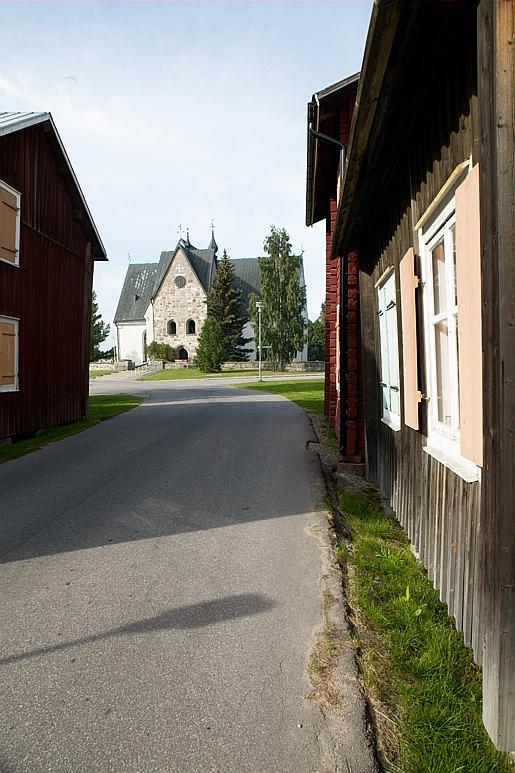
Kyrkstaden cottages and Öjeby Church

== Kyrkstaden ==
Öjebyn has a church town (Swedish: kyrkstaden), an area originally reserved for cottages owned communally by people whose main homes were distant from the parish church. The cottages were also for markets and church meetings, and are now legally protected as a cultural site. Using dendrochronology, at least three of the cottages were surveyed to determine their age: one is after 1781, with an upper floor after 1878; two others are after 1818 and after 1835.

The Öjeby Church, in the church town, was originally built sometime around 1500. The church burned in the 1666 city fire and again in 1721 during the Great Northern War; however, a certain part of the church survived both fires, and the church was converted to a cross shape in the 1750s to accommodate a higher population. A restoration was done in the 1960s.

There are municipal services and commercial activity in the church town.

== Other features ==
In addition to primary schools, there are the Öjebyn Gran's Natural Sciences Gymnasium and Framnäs Folk High School.

Öjebyn has the world's only Paltzeria, which serves different varieties of pitepalt, the culinary specialty of the village. In Öjebyn is also SLU's northernmost test yard.

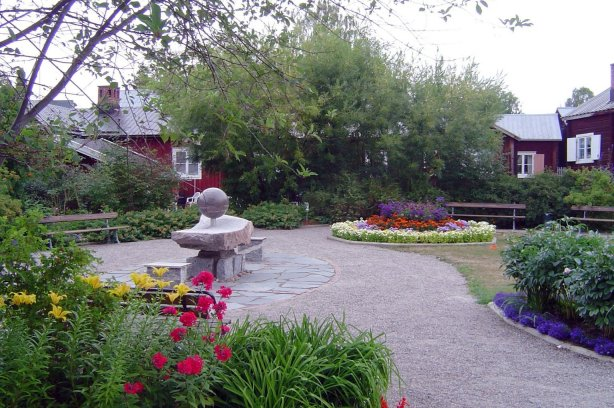
Solander Park

The Solander Park is located in Öjebyn and was opened on 1 July 2000 by the governor Kari Marklund. The park has been landed and funded by the Solander Association to commemorate the city's son Daniel Solander, who was born in Kaplansgården, which was located close to the place where the park is placed. The park is located in the church district in central Öjebyn. The approximately 2,000 square meter park is designed by the landscape architect Irma Johansson-Öberg. In the park there is the monument "Solanders Rocks" built. The monument consists of a wave-shaped stone block (taken from the local bedrock) with a globe and symbolizing Solander's voyages on the world's ocean. The monument was designed by artist Sture Berglund in collaboration with the stone sculptor Sven-Erik Bryggman.

== Sports ==
In Öjebyn there is a sports club, ÖIF (Öjeby Idrottsförening). ÖIF's football team plays in Division 4 Southern Norrbotten. The team ended in third place in the series in 2013. Norrbotten's largest floorball association, Öjebyn IBF, is located in Öjebyn with over 500 players.

== Sources ==
- http://www.piteamuseum.nu/?s=%C3%B6jebyn
- https://www.pitea.se/
- https://www.laget.se/ojebyif
