= Mechtat Mehedia =

Village in Djidioua, Relizane, Algeria

Coordinates: 35°52′52″N 000°46′35″E

Mechtat el Mehedia (Mechtat Méhédia) is a village in Djidioua commune, Relizane Province, Algeria. the village is located on the Plaine du Cheliff on the left (west) bank of the Oued Ang el Djemel, an intermittent tributary of the Chelif River (Wadi Sheliff).
