= Stavreviken =

- Location within Västernorrland Location within Sweden
- Coordinates: 62°33′N 17°25′E
- Country: Sweden
- Province: Medelpad
- County: Västernorrland County
- Municipality: Timrå Municipality

Area
  - Total: 0.30 km^{2} (0.12 sq mi)

Population (31 December 2010)
  - Total: 216
  - Density: 719/km^{2} (1,860/sq mi)
- Time zone: UTC+1 (CET)
  - Summer (DST): UTC+2 (CEST)

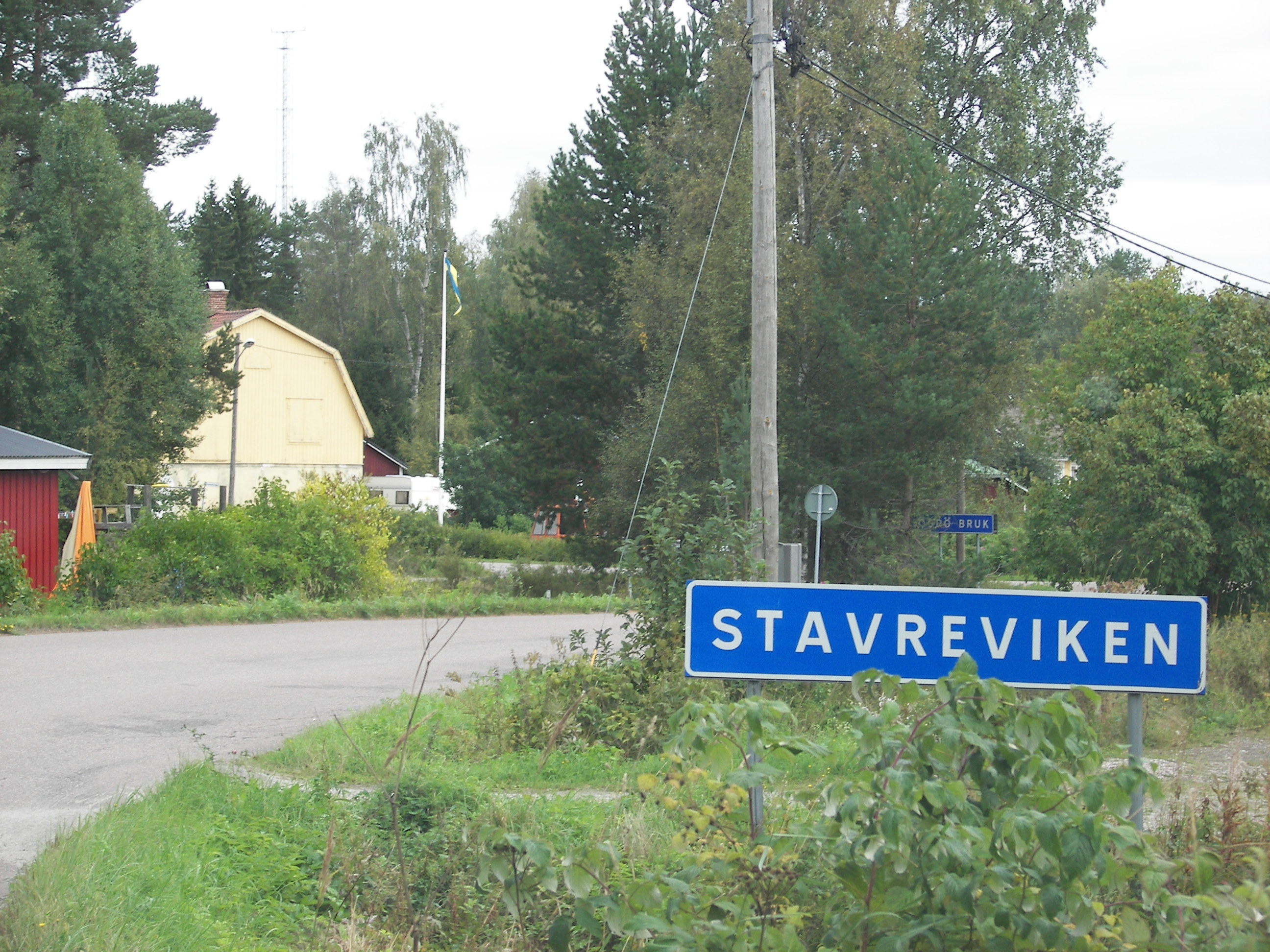

Stavreviken is a locality situated in Timrå Municipality, Västernorrland County, Sweden with 216 inhabitants in 2010.
