= Östra Ljungby =

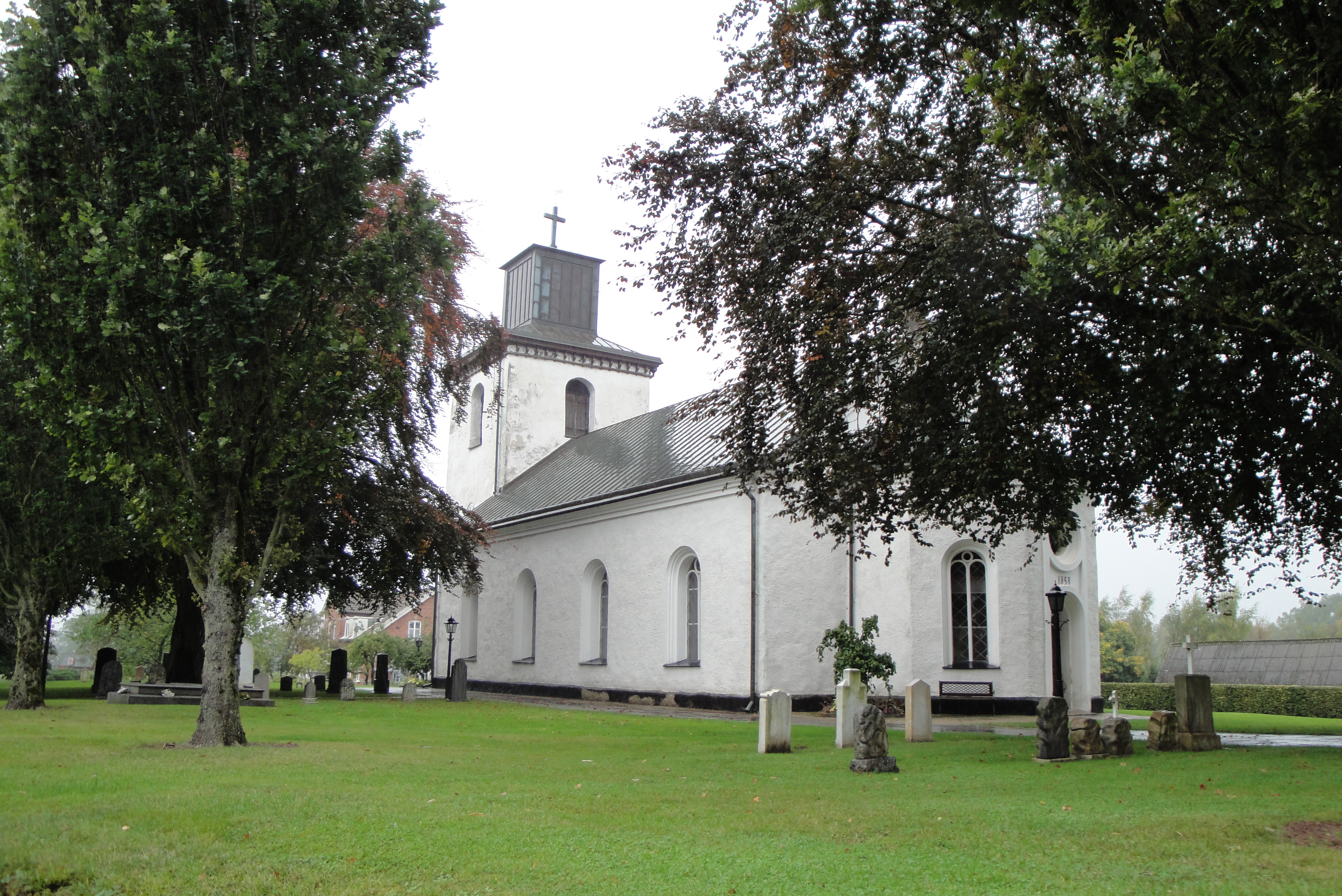
- Östra Ljungby Church

- Location within Skåne Location within Sweden
- Coordinates: 56°11′N 13°04′E
- Country: Sweden
- Province: Skåne
- County: Skåne County
- Municipality: Klippan Municipality

Area
  - Total: 1.0 km^{2} (0.39 sq mi)

Population (31 December 2010)
  - Total: 935
  - Density: 935/km^{2} (2,420/sq mi)
- Time zone: UTC+1 (CET)
  - Summer (DST): UTC+2 (CEST)

Östra Ljungby is a locality situated in Klippan Municipality, Skåne County, Sweden with 935 inhabitants in 2010.

Östra Ljungby was the village where Marie Fredriksson, singer in Roxette, grew up and did sing in the church choir.
