= Mehedeby =

Mehedeby Mehede
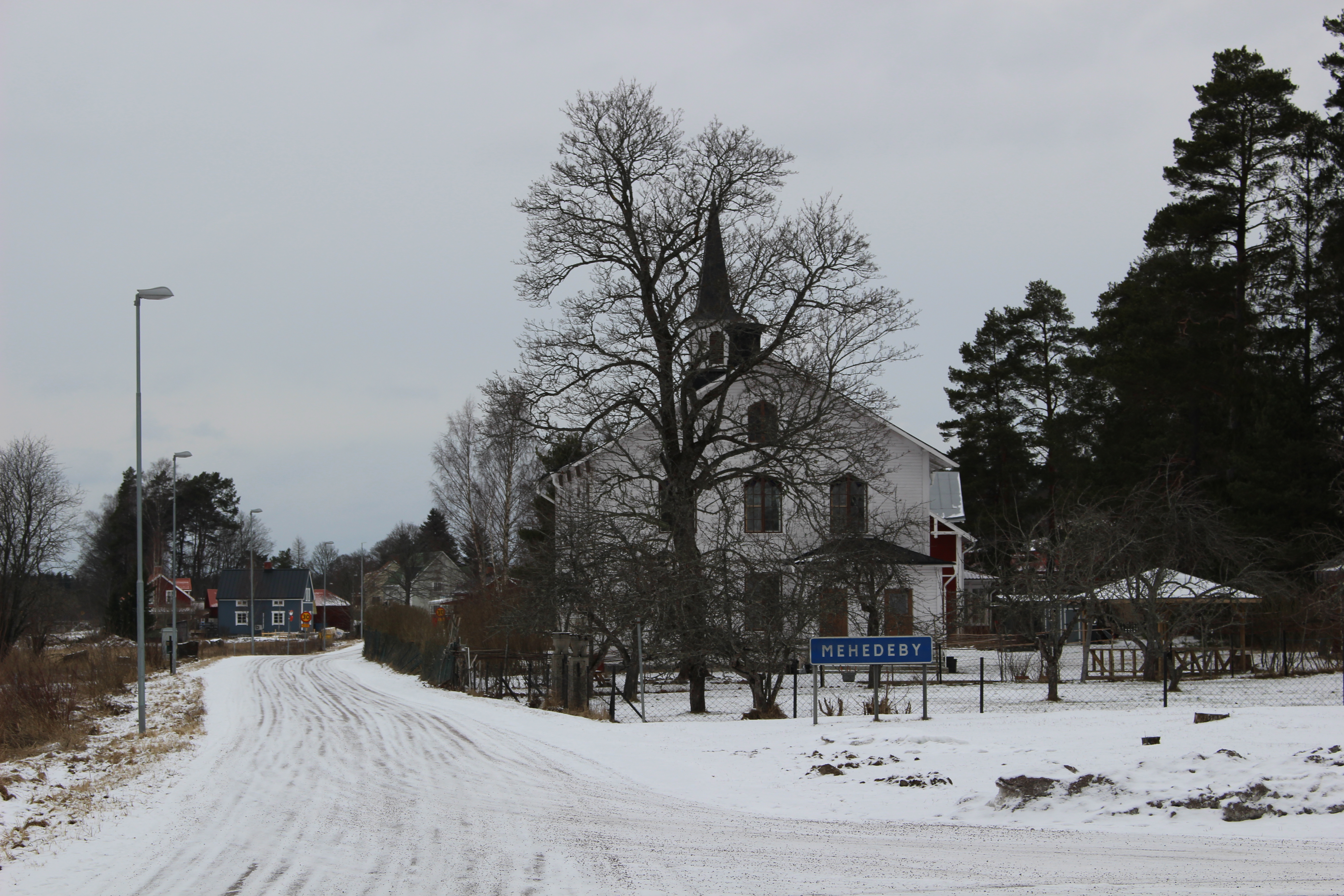

- Location within Uppsala Location within Sweden
- Coordinates: 60°27′N 17°24′E
- Country: Sweden
- Province: Uppland
- County: Uppsala County
- Municipality: Tierp Municipality

Area
  - Total: 0.72 km^{2} (0.28 sq mi)

Population (31 December 2020)
  - Total: 407
  - Density: 570/km^{2} (1,500/sq mi)
- Time zone: UTC+1 (CET)
  - Summer (DST): UTC+2 (CEST)

Mehedeby is a locality situated in Tierp Municipality, Uppsala County, Sweden with 463 inhabitants in 2010.
