= Söråker =

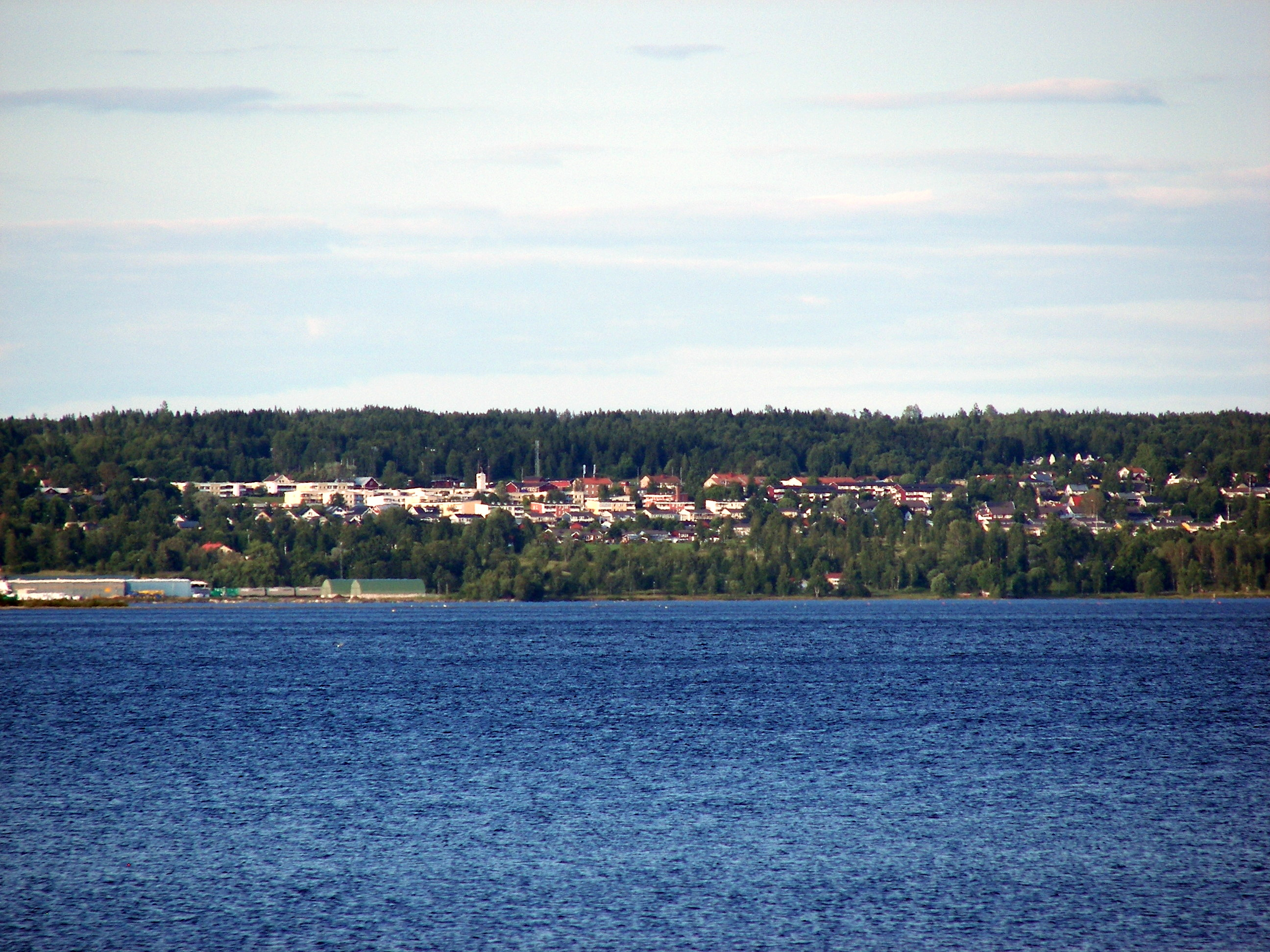
- Söråker as viewed from Vivstavarv in July 2013

- Location within Västernorrland Location within Sweden
- Coordinates: 62°30′N 17°31′E
- Country: Sweden
- Province: Medelpad
- County: Västernorrland County
- Municipality: Timrå Municipality

Area
  - Total: 5.08 km^{2} (1.96 sq mi)

Population (31 December 2010)
  - Total: 2,312
  - Density: 455/km^{2} (1,180/sq mi)
- Time zone: UTC+1 (CET)
  - Summer (DST): UTC+2 (CEST)

Söråker is a locality situated in Timrå Municipality, Västernorrland County, Sweden with 2,312 inhabitants in 2010.

== Sports ==
The following sports clubs are located in Söråker:

- Söråkers FF
