= Rundvik =

- Location within Västerbotten Location within Sweden
- Coordinates: 63°32′N 19°26′E
- Country: Sweden
- Province: Ångermanland
- County: Västerbotten County
- Municipality: Nordmaling Municipality

Area
  - Total: 1.83 km^{2} (0.71 sq mi)

Population (31 December 2010)
  - Total: 817
  - Density: 446/km^{2} (1,160/sq mi)
- Time zone: UTC+1 (CET)
  - Summer (DST): UTC+2 (CEST)

Rundvik is a locality situated in Nordmaling Municipality, Västerbotten County, Sweden with 817 inhabitants in 2010.
