= Nordmaling Municipality =

Nordmaling Municipality Nordmalings kommun
- Municipality
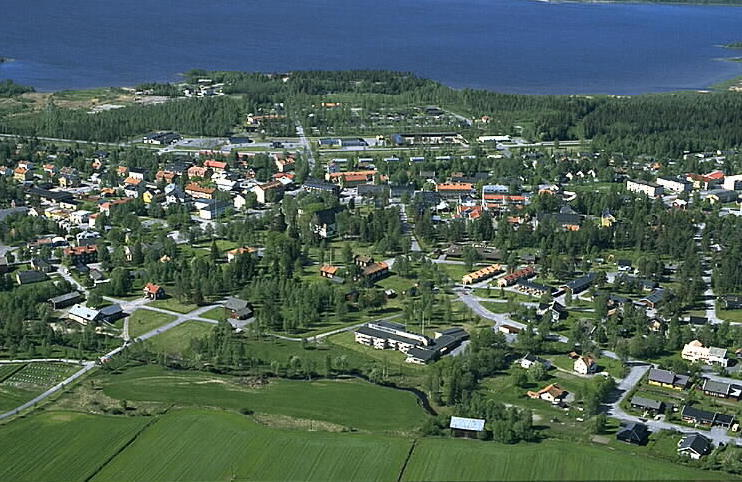

- Coat of arms

- Coordinates: 63°34′N 19°30′E
- Country: Sweden
- County: Västerbotten County
- Seat: Nordmaling

Area
  - Total: 2,472.26 km^{2} (954.54 sq mi)
  - Land: 1,229.42 km^{2} (474.68 sq mi)
  - Water: 1,242.84 km^{2} (479.86 sq mi)
- Area as of 1 January 2014.

Population (30 June 2025)
  - Total: 6,897
  - Density: 5.610/km^{2} (14.53/sq mi)
- Time zone: UTC+1 (CET)
  - Summer (DST): UTC+2 (CEST)
- ISO 3166 code: SE
- Province: Ångermanland
- Municipal code: 2401
- Website: www.nordmaling.se

Nordmaling Municipality (Swedish: Nordmalings kommun) is a municipality in Västerbotten County in northern Sweden. Its seat is located in Nordmaling.

== History ==
The municipal system in Sweden was introduced in 1863 and Nordmaling Municipality was one of the entities created out of a parish. In 1914 a part of the municipality was detached. The subdivision reforms of 1952 and 1971 did not affect the municipality.

== Localities ==
There are three localities (or urban areas) in Nordmaling Municipality:

#	Locality	Population
1	**Nordmaling**	2,619
2	Rundvik	911
3	Lögdeå	414

The municipal seat in bold

== Demographics ==
This is a demographic table based on Nordmaling Municipality's electoral districts in the 2022 Swedish general election sourced from SVT's election platform, in turn taken from SCB official statistics.

In total there were 7,100 residents, including 5,523 Swedish citizens of voting age. 55.0% voted for the left coalition and 44.0% for the right coalition.Indicators are in percentage points except population totals and income.

Location	Residents	Citizen adults	Left vote	Right vote	Employed	Swedish parents	Foreign heritage	Income SEK	Degree
Location			%	%					
Gräsmyr	942	736	47.7	51.4	88	94	6	26,970	30
Håknäs	600	468	55.8	43.0	84	95	5	26,354	27
Levar	1,031	837	58.6	40.4	87	91	9	25,035	25
Lögdeå-Rundvik	1,954	1,526	53.8	45.3	80	89	11	23,691	25
Norrfors	485	404	48.4	51.0	79	92	8	20,348	22
Vallen	2,088	1,552	60.5	38.5	77	82	18	21,882	28
Source: SVT
