= Solberg (Sweden) =

Village in Sweden

Coordinates: 63°47′22″N 17°38′17″E

Solberg is a village in Anundsjö parish in Örnsköldsvik Municipality, about 90 km from Örnsköldsvik. It is known for its skiing facility with slalom slope, cottage village and caravan camping.

Solberg is located in the northern part of Anundsjö parish, five miles from the church village of Bredbyn. The community has its own church building, Solberg's church. The nearby mountain Solbergsliden reaches 594 meters above sea level and is the highest point of Västernorrland County.

== History ==
- In 1983, an earthquake with a magnitude between 4 and 4.5 on the Richter scale occurred in Solberg.
- In 2004, there was a fire in a large number of the cottages as well as in a service building and in a barn. Nowadays, most of it has been rebuilt.
- In 2010, a gold nugget of three grams was found in a stream in Solberg, which by Swedish standards is a large piece. Already historically, there were suspicions that there could be gold in Solberg In the 18th and 19th centuries, gold was searched for in Solberg. It was test mined in Gruvberget about 100 years ago and the rumor spread about a vein under the village church. The last big gold hunt was in the 40s when they even drilled for gold but without much success.
