= Örnsköldsvik Municipality =

Örnsköldsvik Municipality Örnsköldsviks kommun
- Municipality
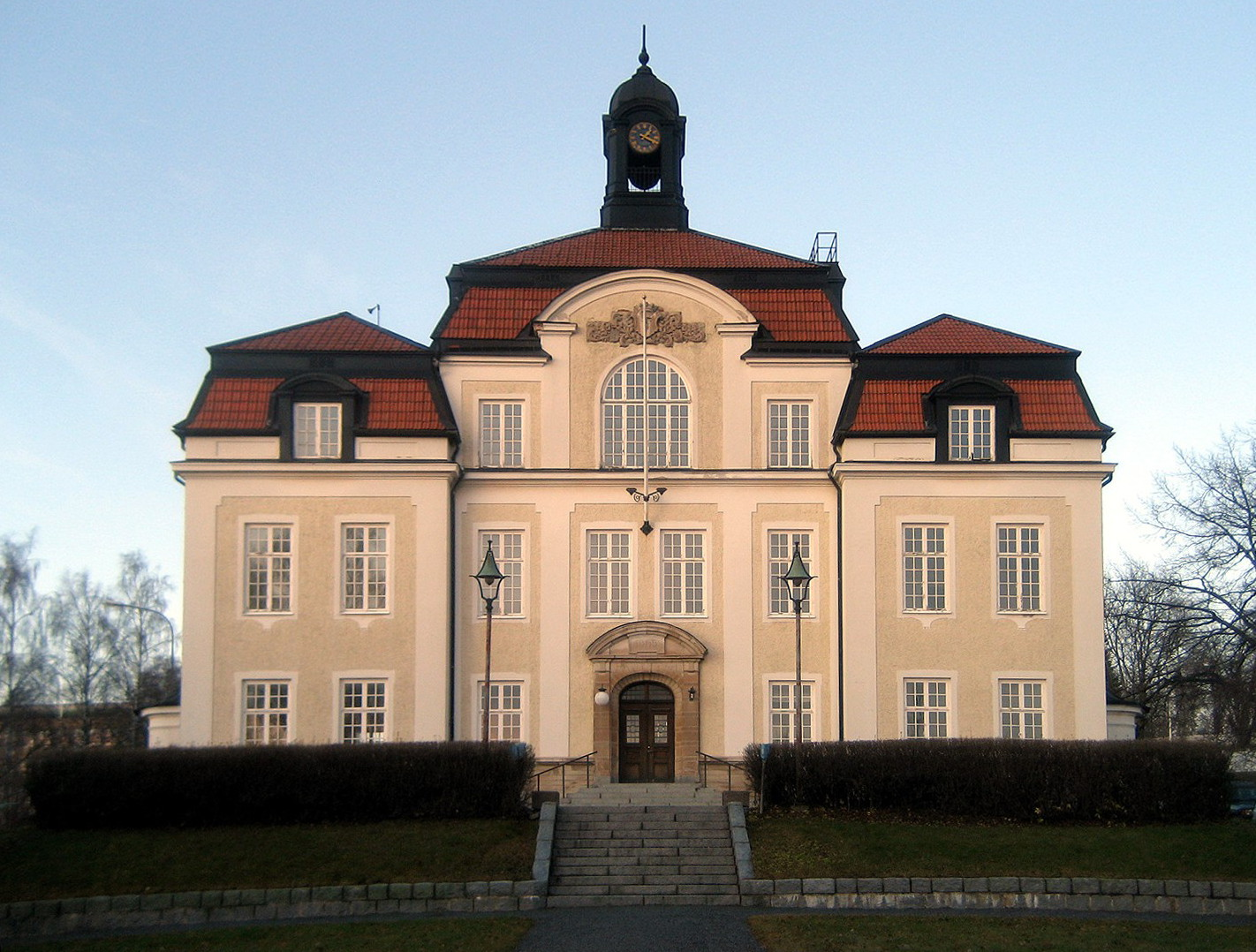
- Örnsköldsvik former city hall, now a school.

- Coat of arms

- Coordinates: 63°17′N 18°44′E
- Country: Sweden
- County: Västernorrland County
- Seat: Örnsköldsvik

Area
  - Total: 8,428.78 km^{2} (3,254.37 sq mi)
  - Land: 6,376.46 km^{2} (2,461.96 sq mi)
  - Water: 2,052.32 km^{2} (792.41 sq mi)
- Area as of 1 January 2014.

Population (30 June 2025)
  - Total: 55,468
  - Density: 8.8/km^{2} (23/sq mi)
- Time zone: UTC+1 (CET)
  - Summer (DST): UTC+2 (CEST)
- ISO 3166 code: SE
- Province: Ångermanland
- Municipal code: 2284
- Density is calculated using land area only.

Örnsköldsvik Municipality (Swedish: Örnsköldsviks kommun; Southern Sami: Orrestaaren tjïelte) is one of Sweden's 290 municipalities, in Västernorrland County in northern Sweden. Its seat is in the town Örnsköldsvik. The present municipality was created in 1971 by the amalgamation of the City of Örnsköldsvik with seven formerly rural municipalities.

== Geography ==
Örnsköldsvik is situated near the northern end of the "High Coast", which is a UNESCO World Heritage Site and has the third longest suspension bridge in Europe, the Höga Kusten Bridge. The city is located around 100km south of Umeå and 550km north of Stockholm. The area is dominated by forest, but it also contains minor areas of agriculture.

=== Localities ===
The municipality of Örnsköldsvik consists of a number of parishes, within which are towns and villages. The population is distributed as follows:

Parish (town) number of citizens (31 December 2005):

- Örnsköldsvik: 9,123
- Arnäs: 7,653
- Anundsjö: 4,100
  - Bredbyn: 1,216
  - Mellansel: 821
  - Solberg
- Skorped: 667
- Sidensjö: 1,192
- Nätra: 5,402
  - Bjästa: 1,777
  - Köpmanholmen: 1,263
- Själevad: 18,960
  - Domsjö
  - Gullänget
  - Sund
  - Gene
- Mo: 1,309
- Grundsunda: 3,214
- Gideå: 1,215
- Björna: 1,586
- Trehörningsjö: 522
- Gottne: 250

Total: 54,943

== Demographics ==
This is a demographic table based on Örnsköldsvik Municipality's electoral districts in the 2022 Swedish general election sourced from SVT's election platform, in turn taken from SCB official statistics.

In total there were 55,778 residents, including 43,029 Swedish citizens of voting age. 58.5% voted for the left coalition and 40.3% for the right coalition. Indicators are in percentage points except population totals and income.

Location	Residents	Citizen adults	Left vote	Right vote	Employed	Swedish parents	Foreign heritage	Income SEK	Degree
Location			%	%					
Arnäsvall	1,258	962	54.0	45.8	87	95	5	27,692	37
Billsta	706	542	52.8	45.9	87	96	4	27,645	42
Bjästa	1,820	1,444	61.4	37.6	79	86	14	21,783	32
Björna N	1,115	868	52.5	44.7	79	88	12	21,955	28
Björna S	679	545	61.4	37.7	87	97	3	26,574	29
Bonäset	1,944	1,449	56.0	43.5	89	96	4	31,980	60
Bredbyn-Sörflärke	1,890	1,535	60.1	38.6	85	94	6	23,055	28
Centrum	1,999	1,876	53.2	45.6	78	90	10	25,093	41
Domsjö S	1,216	902	61.9	37.2	85	93	7	27,360	42
Domsjö V	1,786	1,352	56.7	42.6	86	91	9	29,578	43
Gene	1,694	1,154	56.5	41.6	72	81	19	22,749	35
Gideå	1,084	855	56.0	43.1	87	94	6	24,361	28
Gimåt-Högland	1,445	1,055	57.5	42.0	89	94	6	30,119	54
Grundsunda N	1,273	1,011	53.2	45.3	82	92	8	26,144	28
Grundsunda S	640	559	51.9	47.3	88	94	6	28,704	42
Gullänget	1,929	1,351	58.5	40.6	84	87	13	26,159	40
Haffsta	958	698	53.4	46.1	87	93	7	27,552	39
Husum	1,021	783	62.7	36.3	71	80	20	21,559	22
Hörnett	1,980	1,478	59.7	39.2	86	93	7	29,957	46
Järved	1,278	956	59.7	38.9	86	94	6	27,826	52
Kroksta	1,539	1,161	61.3	37.5	89	95	5	29,220	46
Köpmanholmen	1,603	1,231	59.0	39.7	80	92	8	24,642	34
Mellansel	1,002	756	66.7	32.4	82	85	15	22,375	29
Mo	1,218	930	54.9	43.5	87	97	3	26,874	35
Norrflärke-Solberg	645	522	64.6	35.4	83	95	5	23,559	32
Norrlungånger	1,207	919	62.7	34.6	73	76	24	21,586	34
Nätra-Landsbygd	1,864	1,454	58.5	40.3	86	94	6	26,913	32
Ovansjö	1,156	876	53.5	44.2	89	96	4	28,064	42
Prästbordet	1,848	1,402	52.4	45.7	86	91	9	27,451	41
Sidensjö Skorped	1,704	1,325	59.6	39.3	86	94	6	24,362	32
Sjukhuset	1,181	1,015	57.9	39.6	81	86	14	22,623	41
Skyttis	1,753	1,412	64.2	34.5	69	70	30	21,423	34
Sund	2,313	1,778	59.4	39.8	84	91	9	26,601	41
Svartby-Brösta	1,028	780	58.8	40.8	90	92	8	28,503	46
Valhalla	1,644	1,139	69.5	29.4	59	55	45	18,031	27
Åsdalen	1,363	1,192	61.2	38.0	79	83	17	22,850	42
Östra	1,647	1,176	64.8	34.3	67	68	32	20,332	39
Översjäla	2,093	1,521	59.4	39.4	87	93	7	29,042	53
Övre	1,255	1,065	62.2	36.0	78	81	19	22,461	35
Source: SVT

== Transportation ==
Main road transportations are provided by the European route E4. The Örnsköldsvik Airport provides daily flights to and from the Stockholm-Arlanda Airport courtesy of Höga Kusten Flyg, and also charter flights to Turkey courtesy of Pegasus Airlines. Railway transportation will in the future be provided by high-speed railway Botniabanan, which is currently under construction. There is also a harbour, where cargo ships load and unload timber and other merchandise. In North America, the town is known for its hockey players, a number of whom play with the NHL.

== Recreation and sports ==
Due to the hilly surroundings, hiking and exploring the scenery of the High Coast is popular in the area. In the wintertime, skiing is popular. Both cross-country skiing, alpine skiing and even ski jumping is practiced almost in the downtown area. Since Örnsköldsvik is a coastal town, there are beaches near the town, as well as campsites. There's also an indoor water park called Paradisbadet, with one of the longest water slides in Europe.

The main spectator sport in town is ice hockey, with the local team being Modo Hockey in the Swedish Hockey League, the main league for ice hockey in Sweden. The local football teams are not as successful, but still popular. On the men's side especially, the teams Friska Viljor FC from central Örnsköldsvik and Anundsjö IF from Bredbyn outside of town, and women's Själevads IK. A couple floorball teams from town have also had some success.

== Notable people ==
Örnsköldsvik is the birthplace of many world-famous ice hockey players, including Nils Johansson, Per Svartvadet, Peter Forsberg, Markus Näslund, Niklas Sundström, Andreas Salomonsson, Magnus Wernblom, Mattias Timander, Victor Hedman, Tobias Enström, and the twins Daniel and Henrik Sedin. The Sedin twins were top players for the Vancouver Canucks, and Hedman plays for the Tampa Bay Lightning. Many stars from hockey's previous generation, including Anders Hedberg, Thomas Gradin, and Anders Kallur were also either Örnsköldsvik natives (Hedberg) and/or played in the town for the Modo Hockey club.

- Frida Östberg, footballer
- Malin Moström, footballer
- Miah Persson, soprano
- Magdalena Forsberg, cross country skier and biathlete
- Hans Hedberg, sculptor known for his ceramic fruit
- Märta Norberg, cross country skier
- Tomas Haake and Mårten Hagström, musicians, members of Meshuggah
- Thomas Hammarberg, diplomat and human rights activist
- Niklas Edin, curling player
- Fredrik Lindström, biathlete
- Mikael Bohman, ice hockey player
- Maud Olofsson, politician, leader of the Swedish Centre Party in 2001–2011, Minister for Enterprise and Energy and Deputy Prime Minister of Sweden
- Åsa Domeij, politician and agronomist by training, member of the Riksdag in 1988–1991 and 2002–2006
- Solveig Hellquist, politician, member of the Riksdag 2002–2010
- Emma Nordin, ice hockey player.
- Peter Artedi, naturalist, known as the "father of ichthyology"
- Malin Hållberg-Leuf, figure skater, Swedish national champion
- Eilert Pilarm, Elvis impersonator
- Kristina Lundberg, ice hockey player, Olympic medalist

=== Notable residents ===
- Markus Näslund, and twin brothers Daniel and Henrik Sedin, are all from Örnsköldsvik Municipality; Naslund played for the Vancouver Canucks from 1996 to 2008 and his number was retired by the team in honour of his many accomplishments in December 2010, while the Sedins are captain and deputy captain of the team in 2010–11.

== Twin towns – sister cities ==
Örnsköldsvik is twinned with:

- Äänekoski, Finland
- Hveragerði, Iceland
- Ikast-Brande, Denmark
- Sigdal, Norway
- Tarp, Germany

== Etymology ==
- The original town was named after County Governor Per Abraham Örnsköld
- The name Örnsköldsvik is sometimes unofficially translated into English as Eagleshieldsbay.

== See also ==
- 1976 Winter Paralympics
- Modo Hockey
