= Brita-Kajsa Karlsdotter =

Swedish textile artist (1816–1915)

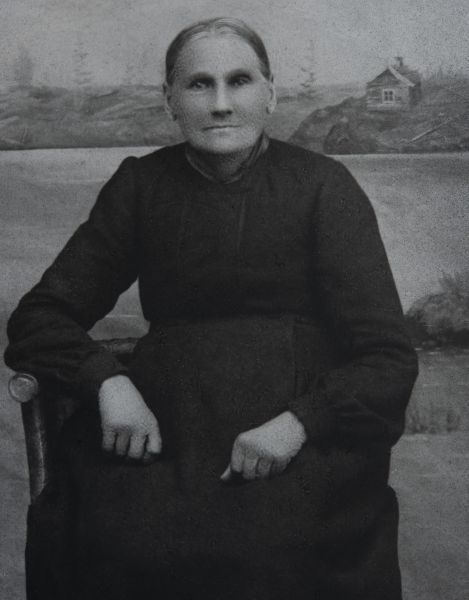
Brita-Kajsa Karlsdotter

Brita-Kajsa Karlsdotter (1816–1915) was a Swedish textile artist who is remembered for creating the Anundsjö stitch (Anundsjösömmen). Consisting of white sheets decorated with flowers, ears of corn and fir needles, her embroidery came to wider attention in 1910 when an exhibition of her work was held by the historical association Ångermanlands hembygdsförbund. Today examples of her works can be seen at the Västernorrlands Museum in Härnösand. Inspired by her work, the four-metre high Anundsjöpigan (Anundsjö Girl) stands in the surrounding area.

== Early life and family ==
Born on 7 November 1816 in Näs, Anundsjö, in central Sweden, Brita Katarina Karlsdotter was the daughter of the crofter Carl Gustav Näsbäch and his wife Brita Danielsdotter, an active sewer. She was the youngest of the family's 11 children Her mother no doubt taught her to embroider when she was still very young.

When she was five, she began to have seizures but thanks to meeting the local priest and the influence of a pious old Sami woman, she was completely cured. As a result, she remained deeply religious for the rest of her life.

In 1849, Karlsdotter married Olof Nilsson, with whom she had 11 children. They moved to a farm in Storsele. She became a widow after 41 years of marriage.

== Embroidery ==
After her husband died, her eldest son took over the farm, leaving her time for her embroidery. Inspired by nature, she decorated sheets, table cloths and towels with flowers, ears of corn and fir needles. She dyed her own threads, often saved from old woven towels. She created new patterns as she worked, never repeating earlier designs.

Of particular interest is the method of stitching she invented when she was almost 70. Known as the Anindsjö stitch, it became popular in handicrafts from Ångermanland throughout the 20th century. She always signed her works with her initials BKKD, 1816 (her year of birth) and the year the item was created. Thereafter she added ÄRTHG for "äran tillhör Gud" or the glory belongs to God.

In 1910, when she was 95, her work was exhibited in Sollefteå by the local history society. Today her works are held in the collection of Västernorrlands Museum.

Brita-Kajsa Karlsdotter died on 24 November 1915, aged 99. She is buried in Anundsjö Churchyard.
