= Husån =

Location
- Country: Sweden

Physical characteristics
- Mouth: Bothnian Sea
  - location: Husum, Örnsköldsvik Municipality
  - coordinates: 63°19′32″N 19°09′15″E
  - elevation: 0 m (0 ft)
- Basin size: 577.5 km^{2} (223.0 sq mi)

Husån is a river in Sweden.
