= Anundsjö Church =

Church in Anundsjö, Sweden

Coordinates: 63°26′43.83″N 18°7′2.96″E

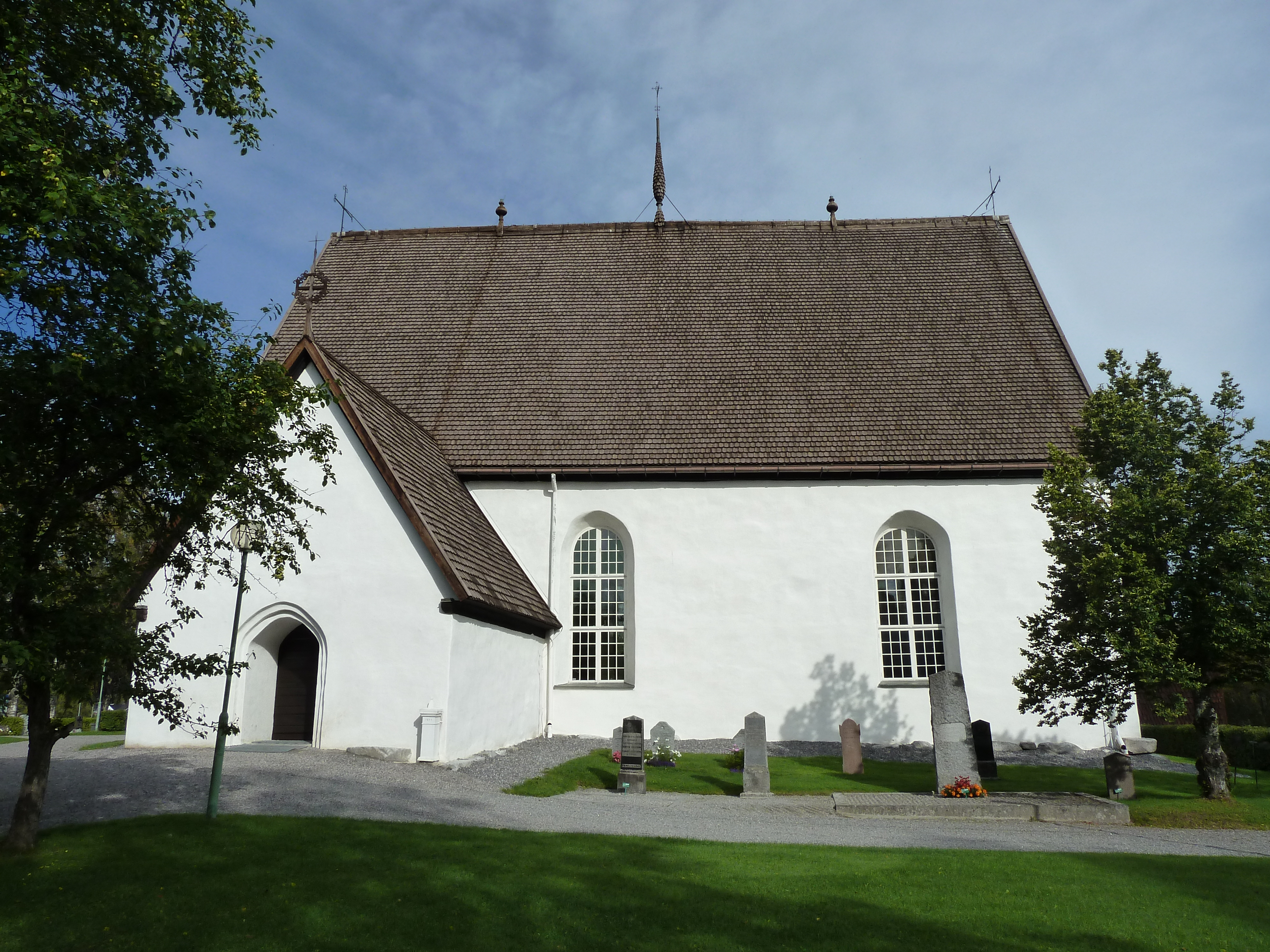
Anundsjö kyrka

Anundsjö Church (Anundsjö kyrka) is a church in the Diocese of Härnösand belonging to Anundsjö parish in the community of Bredbyn in Västernorrland County, Sweden.

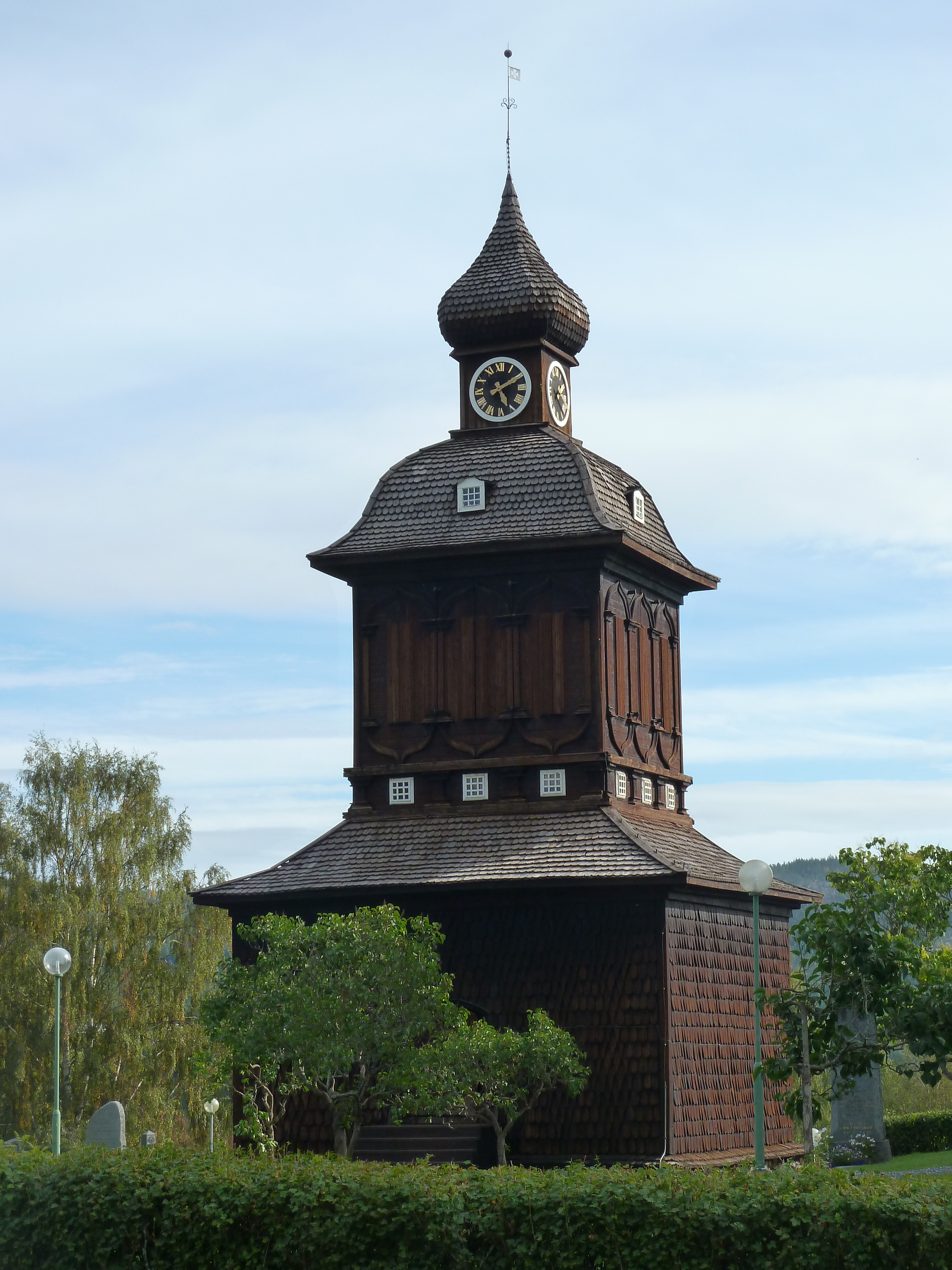
Bell tower at Anundsjö kyrka

== History ==
The first church was built in the 13th century and excavations in the 1950s found the remain. A large cross in the cemetery marks the location of this original church.

The present church was built in 1437 and is a good example of northern late medieval church architecture. It has a simple rectangular floor plan and consists of nave, porch to the south and the vestry in the north. The church is constructed of stone with a roof covered with thick wood paneling. Entrance is through the porch. The church still has its medieval appearance. The church has paintings on the ceiling that were previously painted over with white paint. The original paintings were revealed in a restoration in 1952.

The bell tower was built in 1759 by Per Zakrisson (1723–1780) of Anundsjö. Zakrisson was a craftsman, carpenter, wood carver, blacksmith, and mechanic. He was most noted as a church builder. Above the belfry stands a memorial to him set up in 1959 for the 200th anniversary of the building of the tower. The tower has two bells.

The organ was built in 1925 by Åkerman & Lund Orgelbyggeri of Sundbyberg. The new organ retained the facade of the former organ which dated from 1866.

== Inventory ==
- A six-sided baptismal font carved of wood is dated to 1665. It was a gift of vicar Olof Zachariæ Anzenius in memory of his young son Olaf.
- The pulpit was made in the early 18th century by the wood carver Erik Olofsson Bring.
- Altarpiece with bezel in rococo style is the work of sculptor Pehr Westman and gilded by Jonas Wagenius. The altar glass painting was made in 1913 by Gustaf Mauritz Kjellström
- The crucifix on the southern long wall comes around 1500.
- Some medieval wooden sculptures from the 13th through 15th centuries are now deposited in the county museum.
- Two chasuble are preserved. One is in brown velvet from 1665 and one black from 1772.
- A communion vessel is from 1771. The church silver was stolen in a burglary in 1786 but was later recovered.

== Burials ==
- Anton Julius Winblad (1828–1901), schoolteacher, choir leader, and church organist at Ytterlännäs from 1851 to 1866.
- Frideborg Winblad (1869–1964), schoolteacher at Härnösand, who went on to become Sweden's first female educational administrator
