= Västerhus =

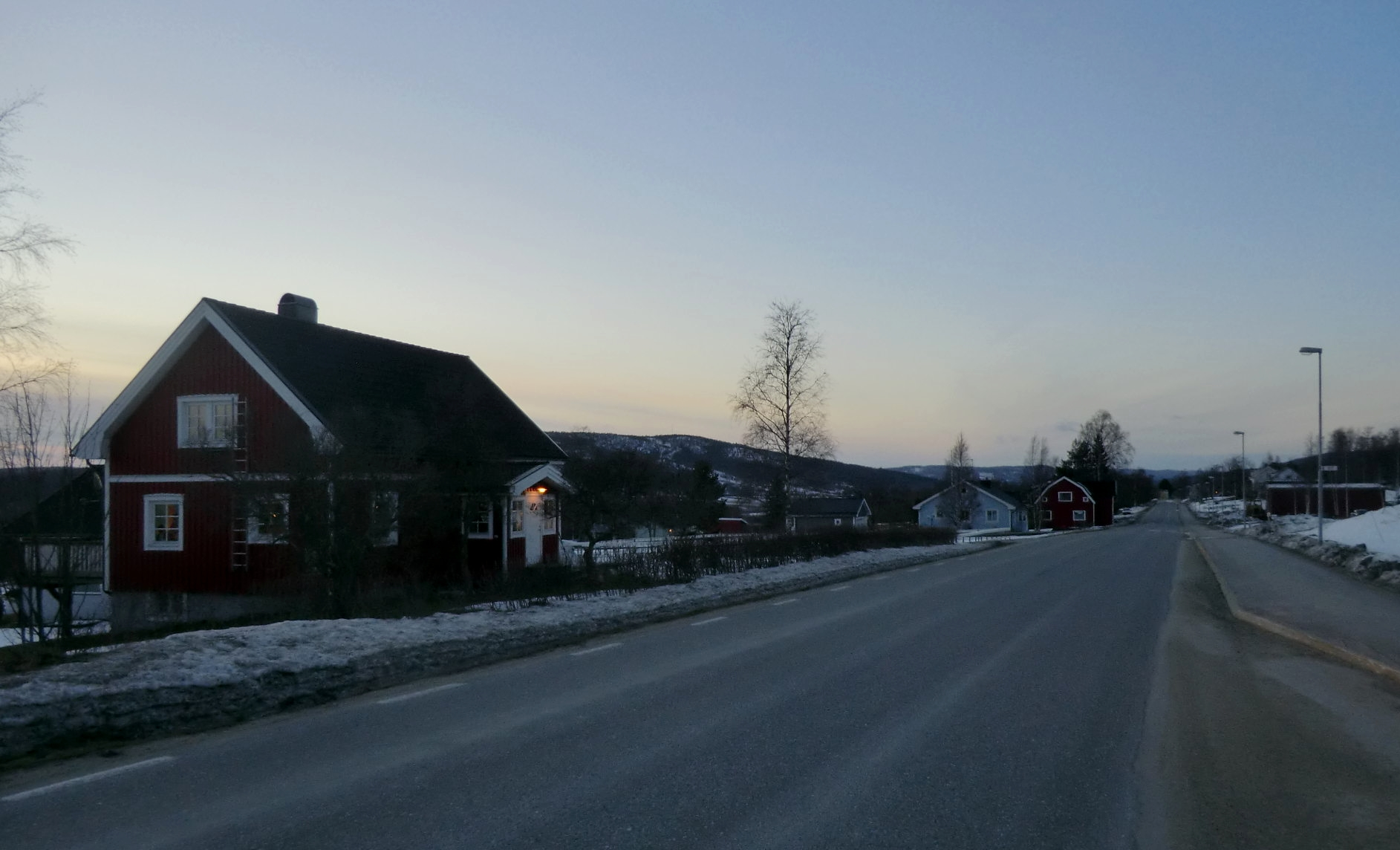
- ästerhus 2014

- Location within Västernorrland Location within Sweden
- Coordinates: 63°20′N 18°33′E
- Country: Sweden
- Province: Ångermanland
- County: Västernorrland County
- Municipality: Örnsköldsvik Municipality

Area
  - Total: 1.01 km^{2} (0.39 sq mi)

Population (31 December 2010)
  - Total: 326
  - Density: 322/km^{2} (830/sq mi)
- Time zone: UTC+1 (CET)
  - Summer (DST): UTC+2 (CEST)

Västerhus is a locality situated in Örnsköldsvik Municipality, Västernorrland County, Sweden with 326 inhabitants in 2010.
