= Örnsköldsvik =

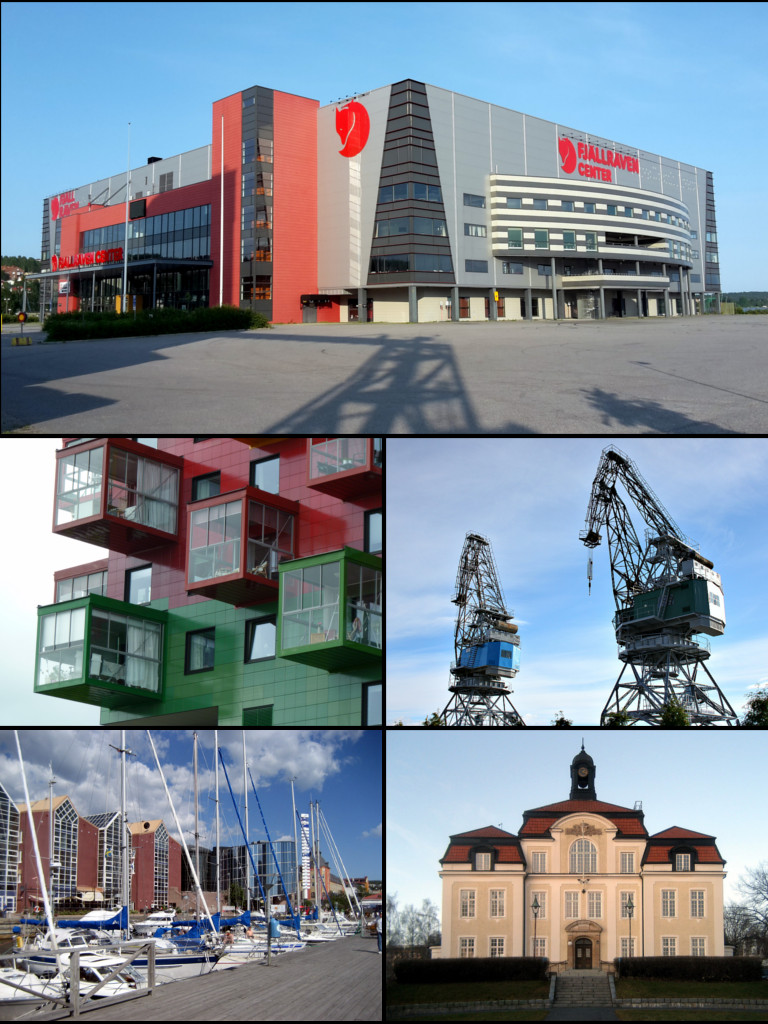
- Clockwise from top: Hägglunds Arena, the port gantries, the old city hall, the guest harbor, and the Ting1 apartments
- Nickname: Ö-vik
- Location within Västernorrland Location within Sweden
- Coordinates: 63°17′27″N 18°42′56″E
- Country: Sweden
- Province: Ångermanland
- County: Västernorrland County
- Municipality: Örnsköldsvik Municipality

Area
  - City: 33.09 km^{2} (12.78 sq mi)
  - Metro: 6,420.97 km^{2} (2,479.15 sq mi)
- Elevation: 18 m (59 ft)

Population (31 December 2017)
  - City: 32,953
  - Density: 8.8/km^{2} (23/sq mi)
  - Metro: 56,139
- Time zone: UTC+1 (CET)
  - Summer (DST): UTC+2 (CEST)
- Postal code: 89x xx
- Area code: (+46) 660
- Climate: Dfc
- Website: www.ornskoldsvik.se

Örnsköldsvik (Swedish: [œɳɧœldsˈviːk]; Southern Sami: Orrestaare), often shortened to just Ö-vik, is a locality and the seat of Örnsköldsvik Municipality in Västernorrland County, Sweden, with 32,953 inhabitants in 2017.

Its natural harbour and archipelago is in the Gulf of Bothnia and the northern boundaries of the High Coast area. It is well known as an exporter of pulp and paper products and heavy machinery goods. It has a strong environmental record and is the "testbed" for ethanol-powered cars.

== History ==
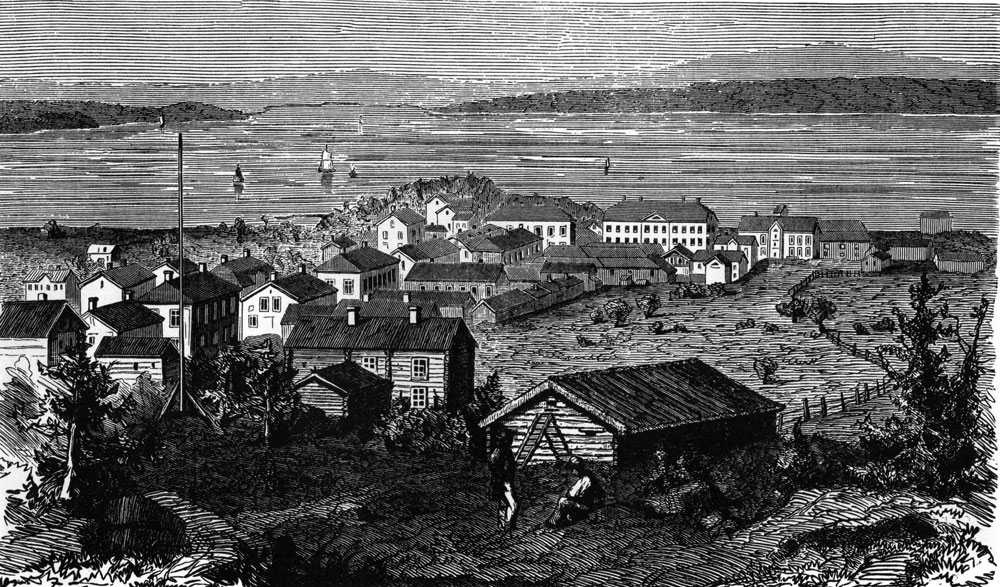
Illustration of Örnsköldsvik in 1861

Traces of human activity in the Örnsköldvik area date back to the Nordic Bronze Age and there is a reconstructed Roman Iron Age village called Gene fornby that is a popular tourist attraction just outside the town.

However, Örnsköldsvik itself is a relatively young city; it was founded as a köping (a Swedish market town) in 1842 and became a city in 1894. Its name originates with the surname of governor of Västernorrland County from 1762 to 1769, Per Abraham Örnsköld, and means "Örnsköld's Bay". The surname Örnsköld literally means "Eagle Shield".

The town hosted the 1976 Winter Paralympics, the first Winter Paralympics.

== Örnsköldsvik Municipality ==
The town of Örnsköldsvik is the centre of Örnsköldsviks Kommun or Örnsköldsvik Municipality. The Municipality has a much larger population than the town itself, at over 56,000 inhabitants, as the municipality is vast with very large forest areas, and consists of several rural communities.

== Economy ==
Historically, the most important economic activity was trade and heavy industry. In the surrounding villages (now incorporated into the city itself) two major industrial ventures arose: the pulp, paper, and logging company Mo och Domsjö (MoDo), now known as Holmen, and Hägglund & Söner (Hägglunds), a heavy industrial company.

Even today, successors to these two companies are of great importance for the city. The Finnish-owned Metsä Board runs a former MoDo locale, one of Europe's largest pulp mills, in the village of Husum 30 kilometres (19 mi) north of Örnsköldsvik, Domsjö Fabriker, another ex-MoDo mill), runs a specialty cellulose mill in Örnsköldsvik, while Hägglunds has been split into several companies, including BAE Systems Hägglunds, a subsidiary of BAE Systems. Other notable companies based in Örnsköldsvik include Svensk Etanolkemi, a producer of ethanol products, and Fjällräven, a manufacturer of wilderness equipment and clothing.

== Education ==
Umeå University has a campus in Örnsköldsvik.

The asteroid 6795 Örnsköldsvik, found in 1993 by Swedish astronomers at the European Southern Observatory, was named after the city.

== Transportation ==
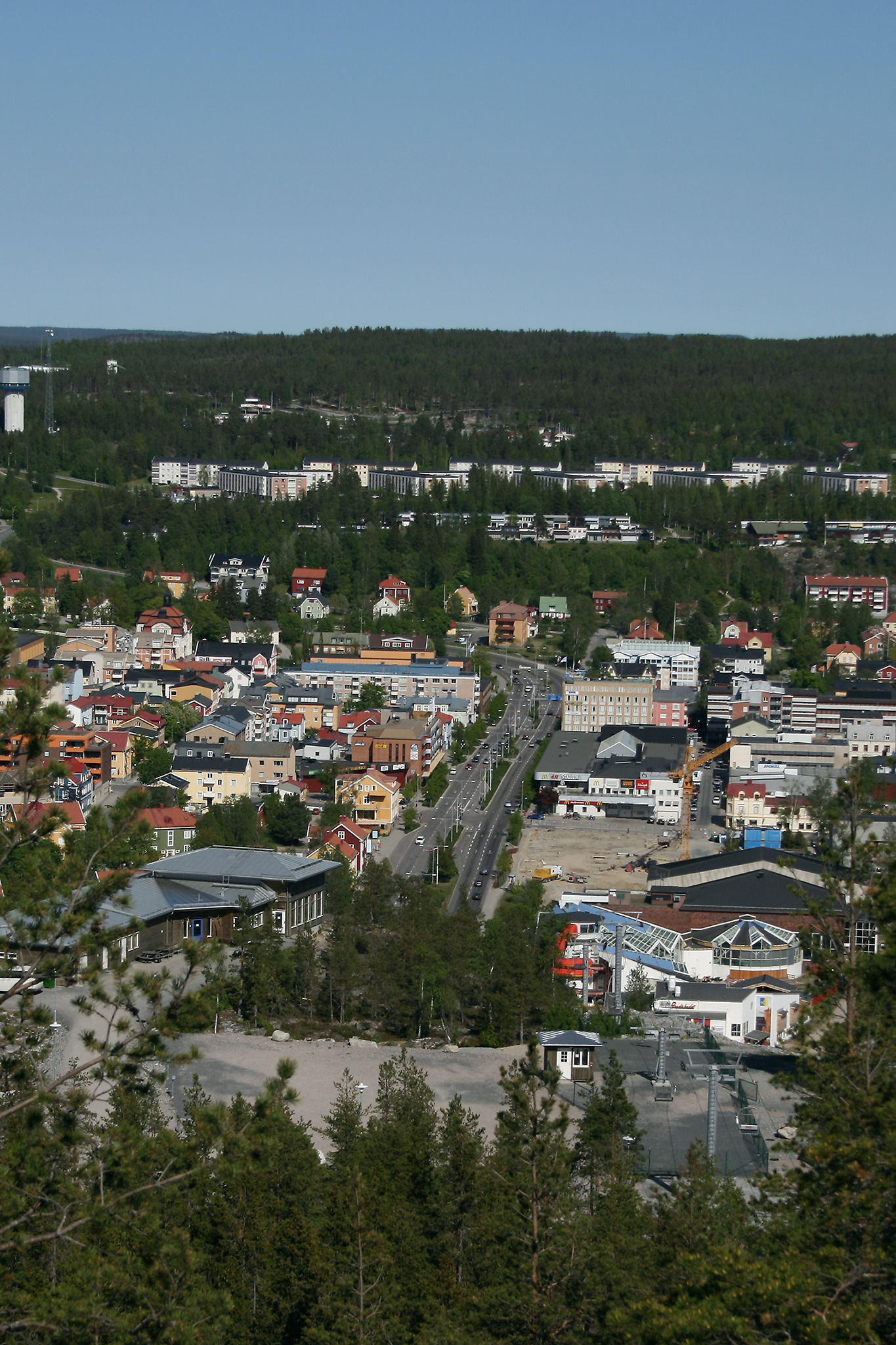
The European route E4 runs through downtown Örnsköldsvik.

Main road transportation is provided by the European route E4.

Örnsköldsvik Airport provides daily flights to and from Stockholm Arlanda Airport operated by Sveaflyg. The terminal building was recently upgraded to allow for some international services. The runway was extended to allow service for larger aircraft.

Railway transportation is provided by the recently opened Bothnia Line. Completed in August 2010, the Bothnia Line adds 190 kilometres (120 mi) of high-speed railway to the Swedish railway network. At up to 250 km/h (155 mph) this is also the highest-speed track in the country. The route branches off from the Ådalen Line at Höga Kusten Airport just north of Kramfors and goes via Örnsköldsvik to Umeå where it connects to the Umeå-Vännäs line and the Main Line Through Upper Norrland. The railway line has 140 bridges and 25 km of tunnels.

Passenger traffic between Umeå and Örnsköldsvik began in August 2010. The delayed upgrade of the ERTMS signal system on the Ådalen Line meant that traffic south of Örnsköldsvik did not begin until 2012.

There is also a harbor where cargo ships load and unload lumber and other merchandise. Prior to Sweden's joining the European Union, Örnsköldsvik had a direct ferry connection to Vaasa, Finland. This ceased operation after entry into the European Union along with the abolition of tax-exempt trade between the member states. The harbor now rarely sees passenger traffic on any large scale.

Being situated on the European route E4, the city is well connected with bus lines. A coastal line from Haparanda in the north to Stockholm makes regular stops at the bus depot in Örnsköldsvik. A cross-country route to Östersund starts and terminates at Örnsköldsvik bus depot.

== Recreation and sports ==
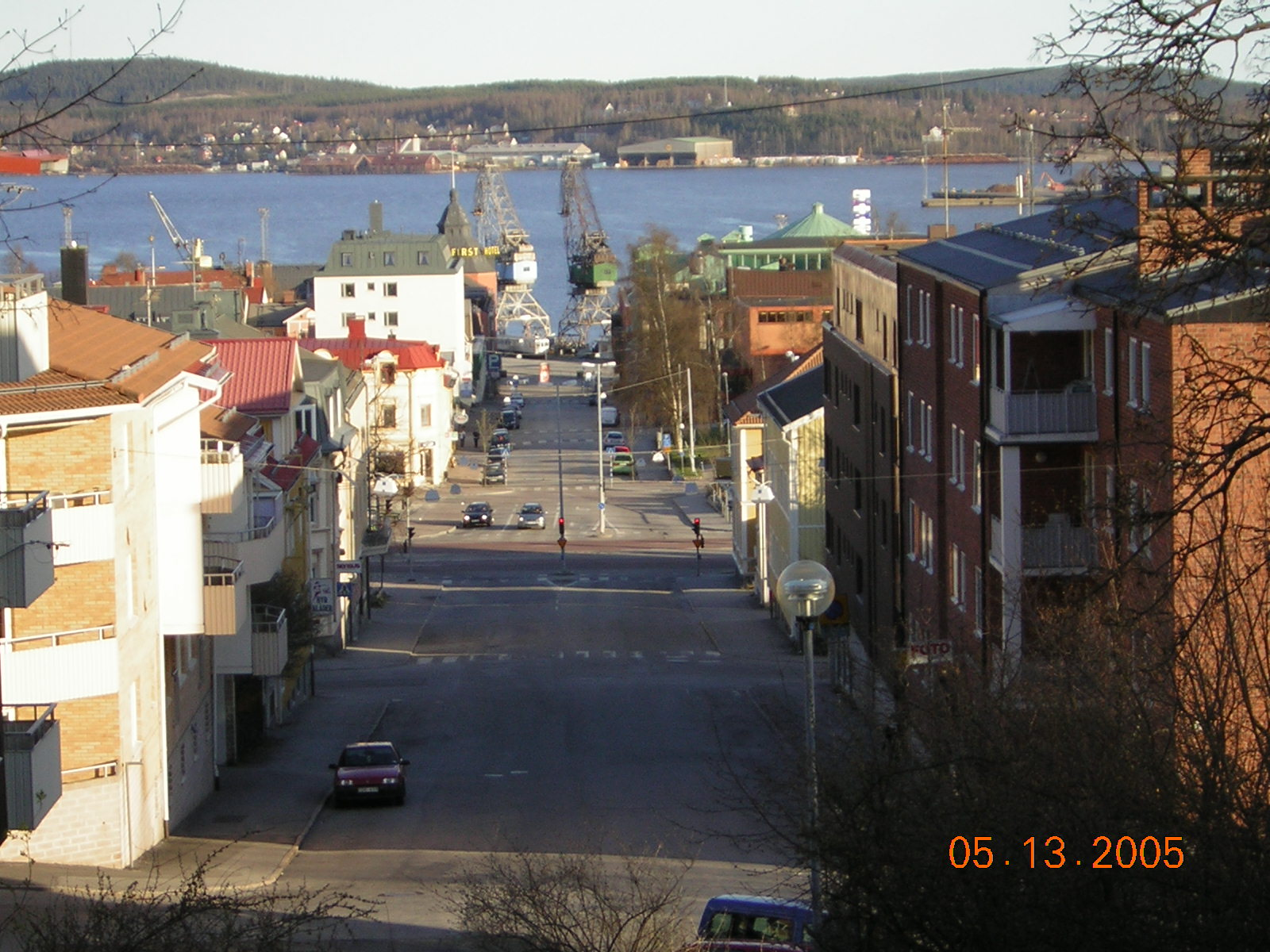
View towards the seaside

Due to the hilly surroundings, hiking and exploring the scenery of the High Coast is popular in the area. In the wintertime skiing and ice hockey are both popular. Cross-country skiing, alpine skiing, and ski jumping are practiced in the downtown area. In international sports, the town is also known for having hosted the inaugural Winter Paralympic Games, in 1976. The 2008 European Curling Championships also took place there.

Since Örnsköldsvik is a coastal town, there are also beaches near town, as well as campsites. There is also an indoor water park called Paradisbadet, with one of the longest water slides in Europe.

The main spectator sport in the town is ice hockey, with the local team Modo Hockey currently playing in the HockeyAllsvenskan, the second tier of Swedish ice hockey. IF Friska Viljor has been successful in ski jumping and the ski jumping hill Paradiskullen is a local landmark visible from downtown.

The local football teams are not quite as successful, but still popular. On the men's side especially the teams Friska Viljor FC from central Örnsköldsvik and Anundsjö IF from Bredbyn outside of town, and women's Själevads IK. A couple of floorball teams from town have also had some success.

A new golf course, Veckefjärdens Golf Club, to the south of the centre is owned by local celebrity ice hockey player Peter Forsberg.

The islands surrounding the coastal area of Örnsköldsvik are big tourist attractions which can be reached by ferry.

== Notable natives ==
Örnsköldsvik is the birthplace of many world-famous ice hockey players, including Stefan Öhman, Nils Johansson, Per Svartvadet, Peter Forsberg, Markus Näslund, Niklas Sundström, Andreas Salomonsson, Magnus Wernblom, Mattias Timander, Victor Hedman, Tobias Enström, Victor Olofsson and the twins Henrik and Daniel Sedin. The Sedin twins were top players for the Vancouver Canucks along with Markus Näslund. Victor Hedman plays for the Tampa Bay Lightning. Many stars from hockey's previous generation, including Anders Hedberg, Thomas Gradin, and Anders Kallur were also either Örnsköldsvik natives (Hedberg) or played in the town for the Modo Hockey club.

- Peter Artedi, naturalist and the "father of ichthyology".
- Mikael Bohman, professional ice hockey goaltender
- Åsa Domeij, politician and an agronomist by training. She was a member of the Riksdag from 1988 until 1991 and then again from 2002 until 2006.
- Niklas Edin, skip of the Swedish curling team at the 2010, 2014, 2018, and 2022 Winter Olympics winning gold, silver and bronze medals, and a seven-time world curling champion.
- Magdalena Forsberg, cross-country skier and biathlete.
- Staffan Götestam, actor and musician
- Tomas Haake and Mårten Hagström, members (drummer and rhythm guitarist) of the technical metal band Meshuggah.
- Thomas Hammarberg, diplomat and human rights activist.
- Hans Hedberg, sculptor known for his ceramic fruit.
- Solveig Hellquist, politician and member of the Swedish Liberal People's Party, member of the Riksdag 2002–2010.
- Malin Hållberg-Leuf, former competitive figure skater. She is the 2006 Swedish national champion.
- Sofia Jakobsson, professional football player.
- Fredrik Lindström, Swedish biathlete.
- Kristina Lundberg, ice hockey player. She won a silver medal at the 2006 Winter Olympics.
- Malin Moström, former captain of the Swedish women's national football team.
- Märta Norberg, cross-country skier at the end of the 1940s and beginning of the 1950s.
- Åke Nordin, inventor, entrepreneur and founder of Fjällräven.
- Emma Nordin, ice hockey player.
- Maud Olofsson, former politician who was leader of the Swedish Centre Party from 2001 to 2011, Minister for Enterprise and Energy from 2006 to 2011 and Deputy Prime Minister of Sweden from 2006 to 2010. She was a member of the Riksdag from 2002 to 2011.
- Miah Persson, soprano, active internationally and in recordings.
- Eilert Pilarm, Elvis impersonator. He gained fame when he performed on Morgonpasset in 1992.
- Frida Östberg, retired football midfielder who played for Umeå IK, Linköpings FC, Chicago Red Stars of the Women's Professional Soccer league, and the Swedish women's national football team.
- Linus Ullmark, ice hockey player.

== International relations ==
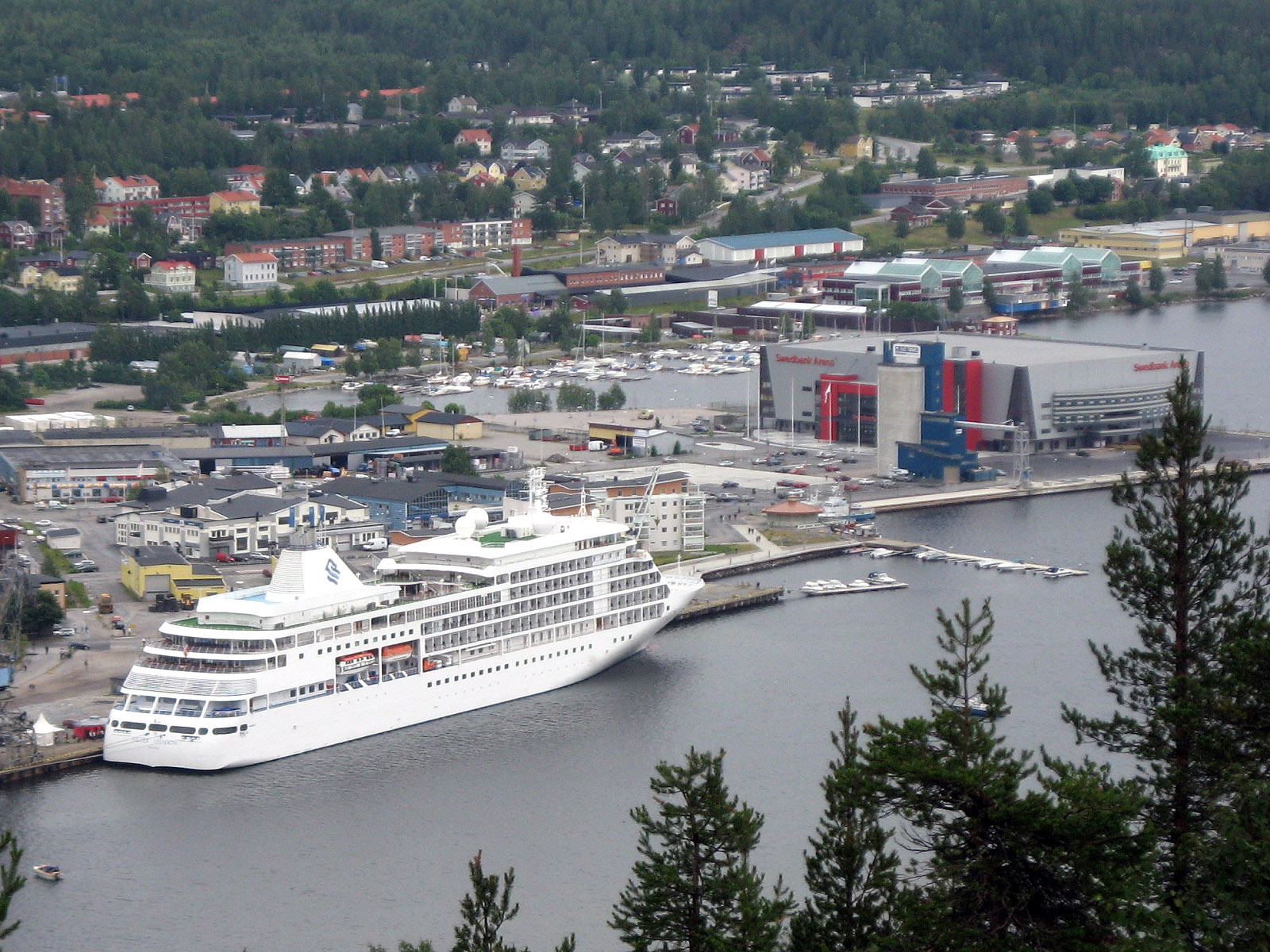
M/S Silver Shadow visiting Örnsköldsvik, with Swedbank Arena (now Hägglunds Arena) in the background.

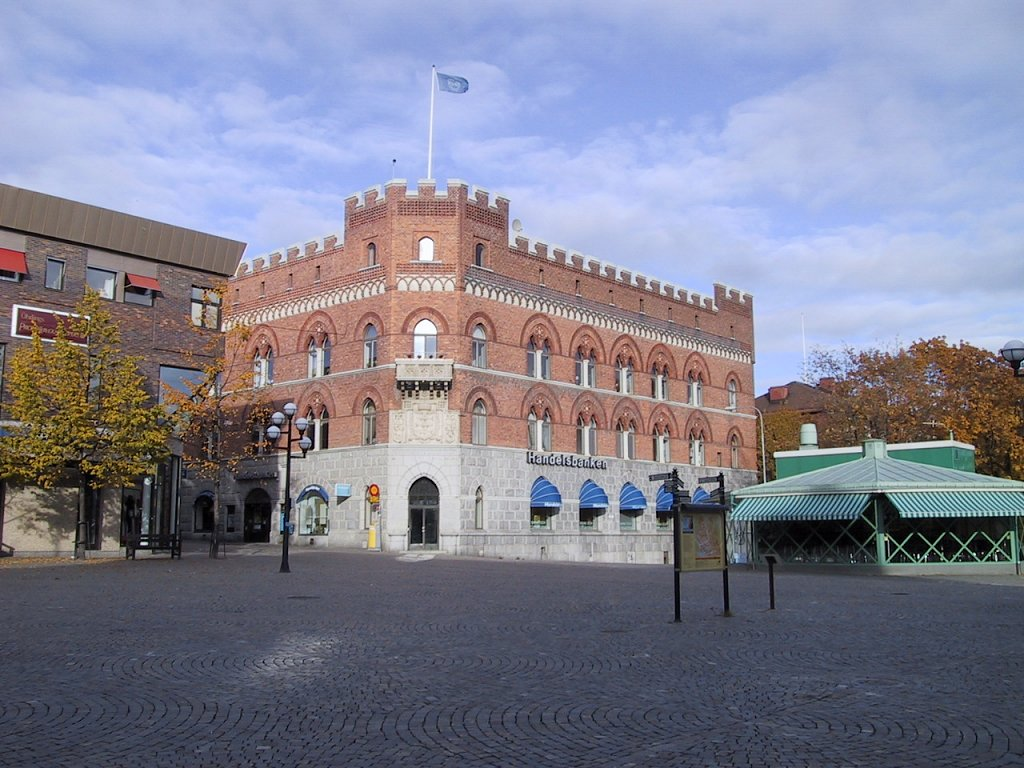
The town square Stora Torget in central Örnsköldsvik.

Örnsköldsvik is twinned with:

- Äänekoski, Finland
- Sigdal, Norway
- Hveragerði, Iceland
- Brande, Denmark
- Tarp, Germany
