= Långviksmon =

- Location within Västernorrland Location within Sweden
- Coordinates: 63°38′N 18°41′E
- Country: Sweden
- Province: Ångermanland
- County: Västernorrland County
- Municipality: Örnsköldsvik Municipality

Area
  - Total: 0.64 km^{2} (0.25 sq mi)

Population (31 December 2010)
  - Total: 221
  - Density: 346/km^{2} (900/sq mi)
- Time zone: UTC+1 (CET)
  - Summer (DST): UTC+2 (CEST)

Långviksmon is a locality situated in Örnsköldsvik Municipality, Västernorrland County, Sweden with 221 inhabitants in 2010.
