= Åmynnet =

- Location within Västernorrland Location within Sweden
- Coordinates: 63°11′N 18°31′E
- Country: Sweden
- Province: Ångermanland
- County: Västernorrland County
- Municipality: Örnsköldsvik Municipality

Area
  - Total: 0.34 km^{2} (0.13 sq mi)

Population (31 December 2010)
  - Total: 340
  - Density: 990/km^{2} (2,600/sq mi)
- Time zone: UTC+1 (CET)
  - Summer (DST): UTC+2 (CEST)

Åmynnet is a locality situated in Örnsköldsvik Municipality, Västernorrland County, Sweden with 340 inhabitants in 2010.
