= Höga Kusten Flyg =

Swedish virtual airline

IATA	ICAO	Call sign
2N	NTJ	NEXTJET
- Founded: 2007
- Ceased operations: 2017
- Hubs: Örnsköldsvik Airport
- Fleet size: 1
- Destinations: 2
- Headquarters: Örnsköldsvik, Sweden
- Key people: Jimmy Nilsson (CEO), Peter Forsberg (Investor)
- Website: http://www.hogakustenflyg.se

Höga Kusten Flyg was a virtual airline based in Örnsköldsvik, Sweden. It operated scheduled services within Sweden using aircraft and flight codes of its subsidiary, Nextjet, or other operators.

== History ==
The airline was established in 2007 to operate domestic flights between Stockholm and Örnsköldsvik. In December 2012, it acquired the larger Swedish airline Nextjet and merged its operations with it. In 2016, the sale of Nextjet was announced and in 2018, Nextjet filed for bankruptcy.

== Destinations ==
As of December 2015, Höga Kusten Flyg operated the following services:

Sweden

- Stockholm - Stockholm-Arlanda Airport
- Örnsköldsvik - Örnsköldsvik Airport

== Fleet ==
As of December 2015, the Höga Kusten Flyg fleet included the following aircraft:

Höga Kusten Flyg
Aircraft	In fleet	Passengers	Notes
ATR 72-202	1	68	Operated by Danish Air Transport under Nextjet flight codes
Total	1		

== See also ==
- Airlines
- Transport in Sweden
