= Märta Norberg =

Swedish cross-country skier (1922–2020)

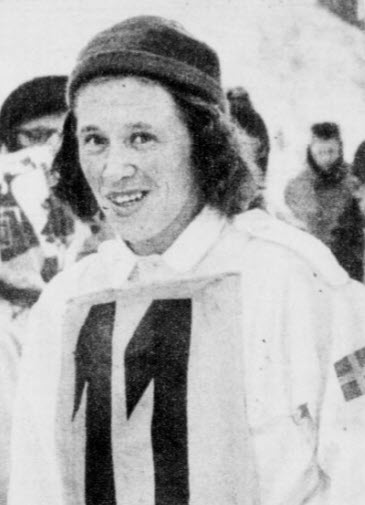

Personal information
- Nationality: Sweden
- Born: 19 September 1922 Sidensjö, Sweden
- Died: 19 December 2020 (aged 98)

Sport
- Sport: Skiing
- Club: Vårby IK
Medal record
Women's cross-country skiing
Representing Sweden
World Championships
Bronze medal – third place	1954 Falun	3 × 5 km relay
Bronze medal – third place	1958 Lahti	3 × 5 km relay

Märta Norberg (19 September 1922 – 19 December 2020) was a Swedish cross-country skier who competed in the 1950s. She won two bronze medals in the 3 × 5 km relay at the FIS Nordic World Ski Championships (1954, 1958). She was born in Örnsköldsvik, Ångermanland. Norberg finished fourth in the 10 km event at the 1952 Winter Olympics in Oslo.

== Cross-country skiing results ==
=== Olympic Games ===
Year	Age	10 km
1952	29	4

=== World Championships ===
- 2 medals – (2 bronze)

Year	Age	10 km	3 × 5 km relay
1954	31	—	Bronze
1958	35	10	Bronze
