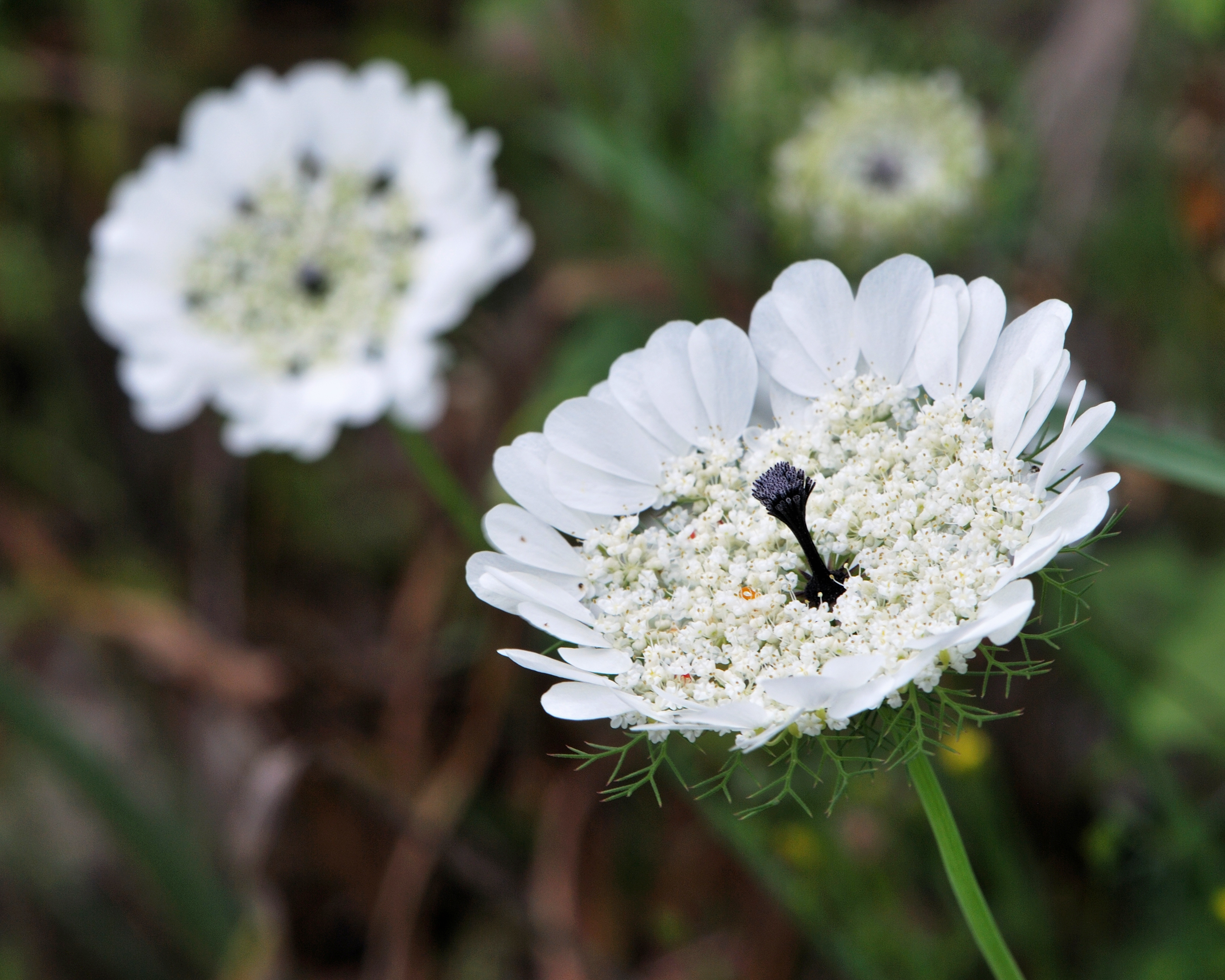

Scientific classification
- Kingdom: Plantae
- Clade: Tracheophytes
- Clade: Angiosperms
- Clade: Eudicots
- Clade: Asterids
- Order: Apiales
- Family: Apiaceae
- Subfamily: Apioideae
- Tribe: Scandiceae
- Genus: Artedia; L.
- Species: A. squamata

Binomial name
- Artedia squamata L.

= Artedia =

Genus of flowering plants

Artedia is a genus of flowering plant in the Apiaceae. Its only species is Artedia squamata, native to Cyprus, Western Asia and the Transcaucasus.

Carl Linnaeus named the species after his friend, the naturalist Peter Artedi.
