= Sidensjö Church =

Coordinates: 63°17′28″N 18°17′42″E

Sidensjö kyrka (Sidensjö Church)
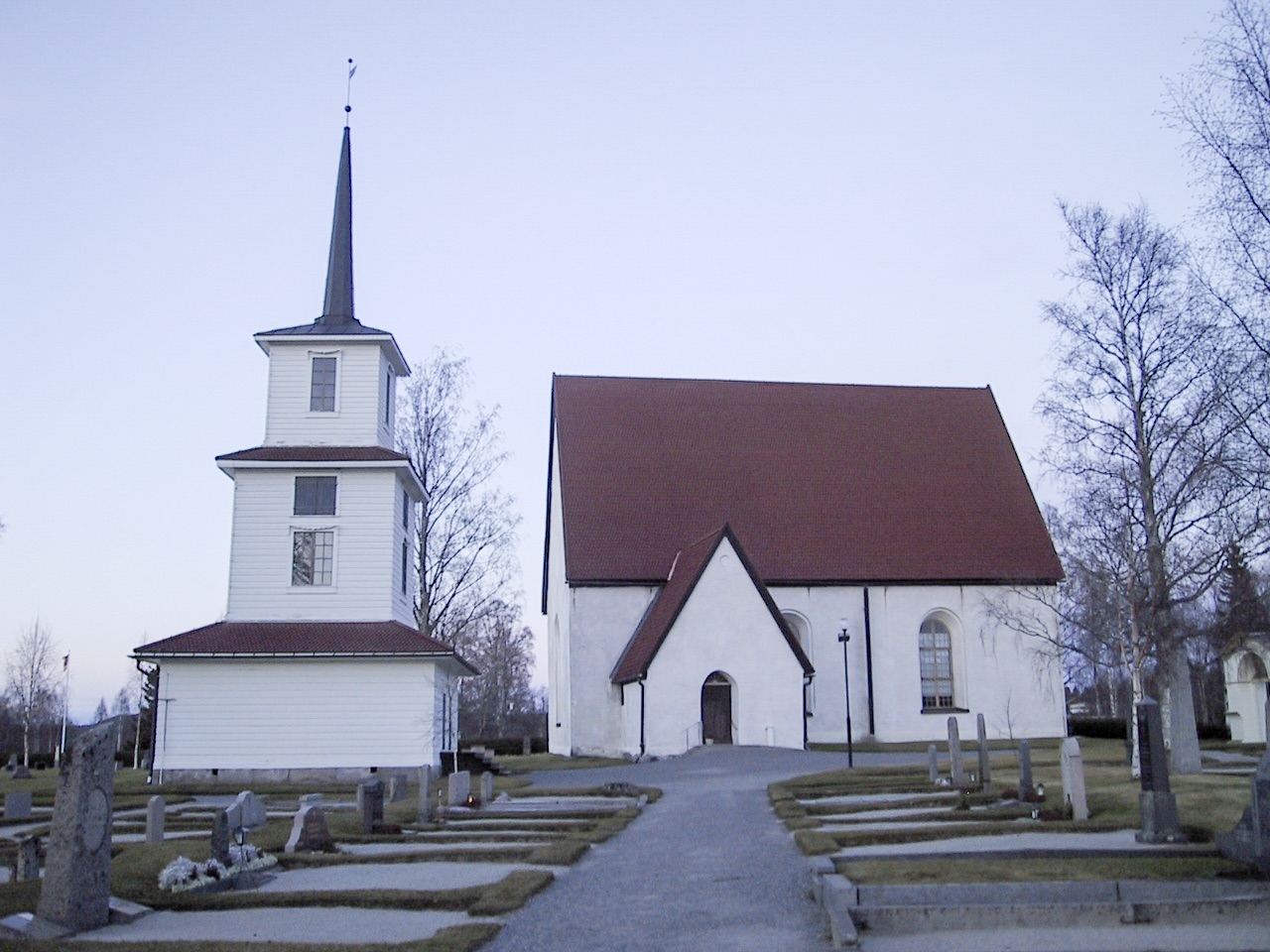
- Sidensjö church in November 2005
- Location: Sidensjö
- Country: Sweden
- Denomination: Church of Sweden
- Website: Nätra-Sidensjö pastorat

Administration
- Diocese: Diocese of Härnösand
- Parish: Sidensjö parish

Sidensjö Church (Sidensjö kyrka) is a medieval church in the Diocese of Härnösand belonging to Sidensjö parish in the community of Sidensjö in Västernorrland County, Sweden.

== Architecture and history ==
The church is a stone building in Romanesque style with a detached belfry in wood. The main part of the church was built during the 14th century, while the first sacristy on the northern side was built during the 15th century. After the Reformation, paintings were added to roofs and arches. The current sacristy is of wood and was built sometime in the middle of the 18th century and replaced an older sacristy of stone.
