= Själevads IK =

Sports club in Själevad, Sweden

- Full name: Själevads idrottsklubb
- Sport: Soccer; Bandy, Ice Hockey, Orienteering, Skiing (earlier)
- Founded: May 1923
- League: Division 1 Norra
- Based in: Själevad, Sweden
- Ballpark: Själevads IP

Själevads IK is a sports club from Själevad, 5 kilometres west of Örnsköldsvik, Sweden. The women's soccer season of 2004 was the first in the Swedish top division, Damallsvenskan, for the club, which qualified for yet another season. before being relegated in 2005.

Själevads IK play their home games at Själevads IP Stadium in Själevad. The team colours are green and white.

The club has previously been active in other sports too, such as bandy, ice hockey, and orienteering.

== Current squad ==
As of 12 May 2024

Note: Flags indicate national team as defined under FIFA eligibility rules; some limited exceptions apply. Players may hold more than one non-FIFA nationality.

No.	Pos.	Nation	Player
1	GK	SWE	Saga Olovsson Hagström
5	DF	SWE	Angelika Östberg (captain)
6	DF	SWE	Adine Lindahl
7	MF	SWE	Elsa Jonsson
8	DF	SWE	Tilde Cederblad
9	MF	SWE	Elin Eriksson
10	MF	SWE	Meya Magnussen
12	DF	SWE	Agnes Jonsson
15	MF	SWE	Maja Persson

No.	Pos.	Nation	Player
16	MF	SWE	Irma Lindberg
17	MF	SWE	Stina Blomquist
18	FW	SWE	Ida Zakrisson
19	DF	SWE	Matilda Melin
21	MF	SWE	Alice Fridlund
22	FW	SWE	Lova Larsson
23	DF	SWE	Nellie Henriksson
24	MF	SWE	Nellie Moström
25	DF	SWE	Emma Östlund
26	FW	SWE	Marie Dahlberg
27	MF	SWE	Maja Bostedt
28	DF	SWE	Molly Englund
30	GK	SWE	Beata Forsberg
