= Skorped, Sweden =

Skorped
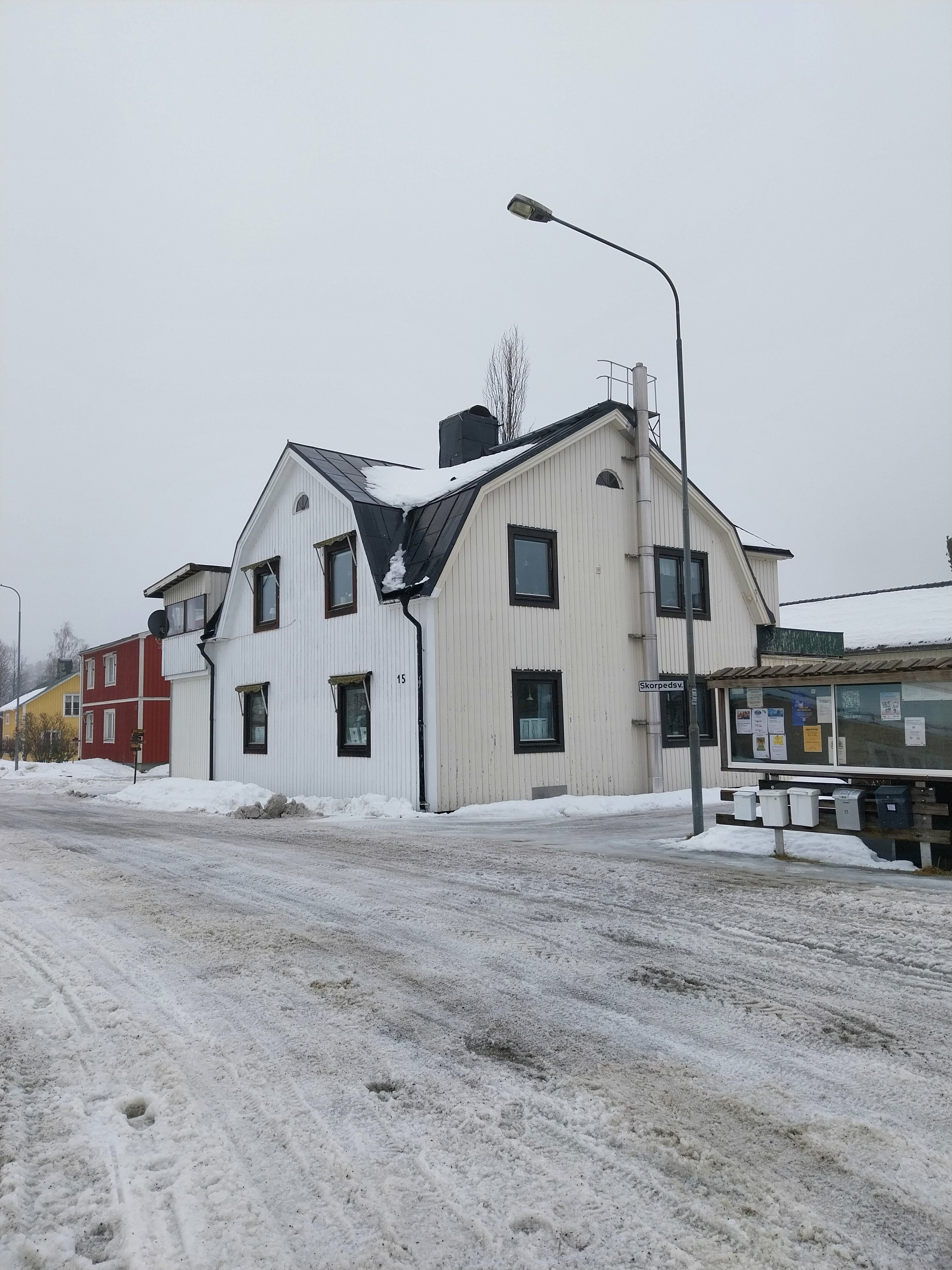
- Image of the old Posthouse.

- Location within Västernorrland Location within Sweden Location within European Union
- Coordinates: 63.384055°N 17.852200°E
- Country: Sweden
- Province: Ångermanland
- County: Västernorrland County
- Municipality: Örnsköldsvik Municipality

Area
  - Total: 0.24 km^{2} (0.093 sq mi)

Population (31 December 2022)
  - Total: 554
  - Density: 115/km^{2} (300/sq mi)
- Time zone: UTC+1 (CET)
  - Summer (DST): UTC+2 (CEST)
- Website: https://skorped.se/startsida/om-skorped/

Skorped is a locality situated in Örnsköldsvik Municipality, Västernorrland County, Sweden with 554 inhabitants as of the year 2022. The Northern Main Line railway runs through the town.
