= Frideborg Winblad =

- Winblad circa 1950
- Born: January 18, 1869; Bredbyn, Sweden
- Died: November 30, 1964 (aged 95); Härnösand
- Education: Umeå University
- Known for: Sweden's first female educational administrator
- Parent(s): Anton Julius Winblad I (1828–1901); Elsa Maria Elisabeth Näslund (1829–1907)
- Relatives: David Emanuel Wahlberg, nephew

Frideborg Winblad (January 18, 1869 – November 30, 1964) was an elementary school teacher in Härnösand, Sweden, who went on to become Sweden's first female educational administrator.

== Early life ==
Frideborg was the daughter of Anton Julius Winblad I (1828–1901), the church organist and the first schoolteacher of Ytterlännäs, Sweden; and Elsa Maria Elisabeth Näslund (1829–1907). Elsa's father was the vicar of Ytterlännäs. Frideborg was born in Anundsjö, Västernorrland, Sweden.

== Teacher ==
Frideborg graduated from the Teacher's School in Umeå in 1896 at age 27. By 1890, she was living in the "prestbolet" with her parents, and working alongside her father. She moved to Härnösand on October 5, 1896, and lived at #137, 8th quarter in the city. In 1900, she was still living in Härnösand by herself and was working as a "lärarinna". She never married or had children. Her father died in 1901 and her mother in 1907, after which she became the director of a seminary training college in Härnösand. She retired in 1929. In 1939, a scholarship was created in her name.

== Death ==
Frideborg died on November 30, 1964, at the Fristad Nursing Home, Härnösand, Sweden. She was buried in Anundsjö, Västernorrland län, with her parents.
