= Hans Hedberg =

French sculptor

- Born: May 25, 1917; Köpmanholmen, Västernorrland County, Sweden
- Died: March 27, 2007 (aged 89); Cannes, France
- Occupation: Ceramicist
- Spouse(s): Mouchka; Charlotte
- Children: 1
- Parent(s): Ingeborg Belfrage; Theodor Hedberg

Hans Hedberg (May 25, 1917 – March 27, 2007) was a French sculptor who resided in Biot in southern France until his death. Hedberg was born in Köpmanholmen, Västernorrland County, Sweden. He was mostly known for his gigantic ceramic sculptures of fruit and eggs, and has installations in several countries, especially in his native Sweden and in France.

He attended a boarding school in Stockholm, which he graduated from in 1938. During World War II, in which Sweden was neutral, Hedberg entered the military and served with a platoon of Sámi.

He briefly attended the Royal Danish Academy of Fine Arts, to study painting, and the Académie Colarossi. In 1947, he went to Capri, where he grew interested in pottery. He then spent two years at the Instituto d’Art della Ceramica.

In 1949, Hedberg moved to Biot, Castelnau-de-Brassac, and established a studio. Marc Chagall apprenticed under Hedberg for three months, and Pablo Picasso also exchanged pottery advice with Hedberg. Comparing the two, Hedberg said "[Chagall] was as insecure as Picasso was quick and confident when it came to learning new techniques". Other notable artists collaborated with or learned from Hedberg, including Fernand Léger, and Henri Matisse.

Hedberg's work grew less traditional, and he began using plaster moulds instead of traditional modeling methods, as well as new glazes and enamels.

While creating free-standing sculptures, he also created reliefs for a multitude of buildings, including the parish church in Köpmanholmen, and the Faculty of Science at Marseille University.

The Hans Hedberg Museum opened in 1998, dedicated to displaying Hedberg's work, and was located in Örnsköldsvik, Sweden.

In 2007, Hedberg died.
