= Mellansel =

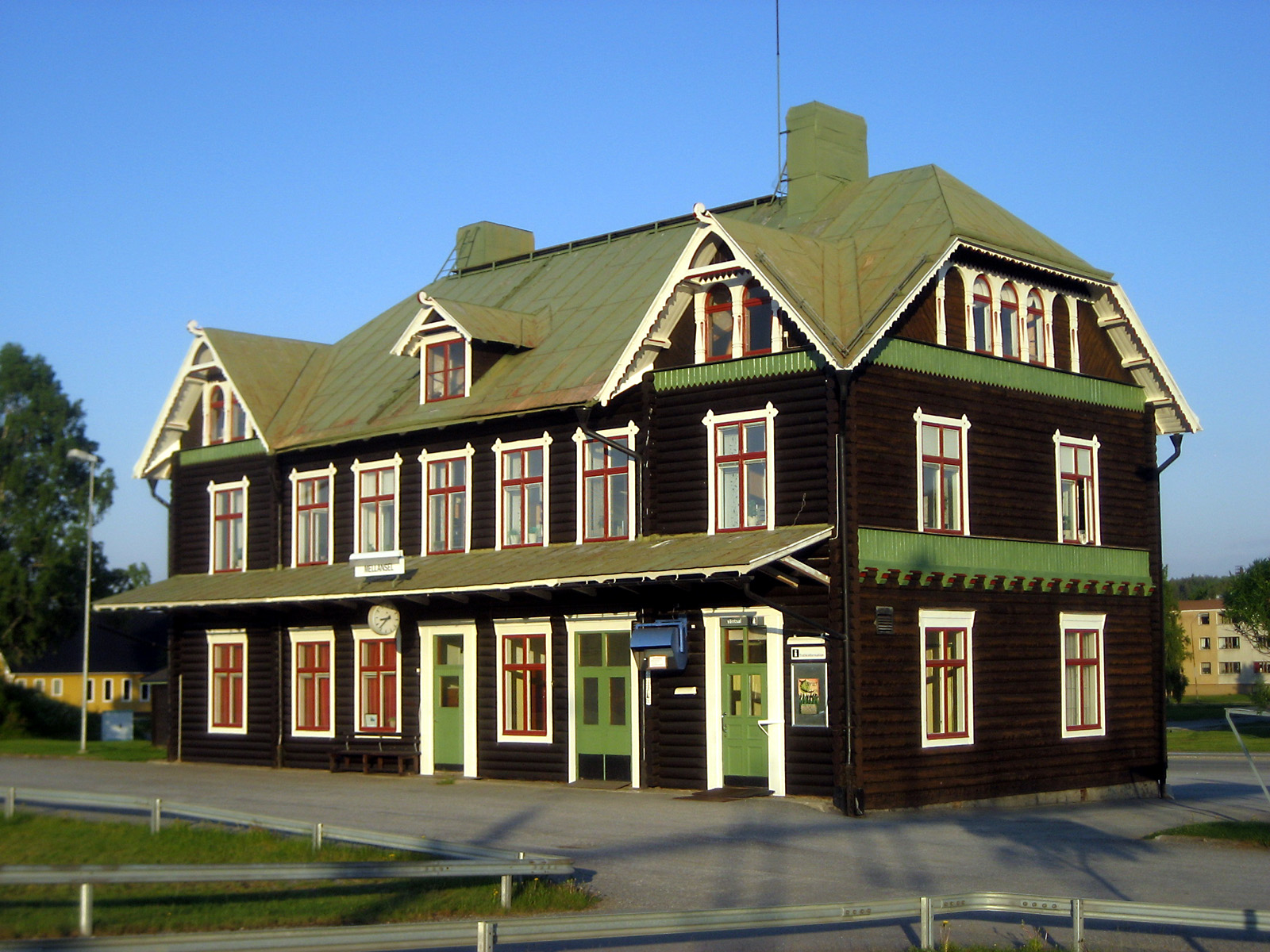
- Mellansel Railway Station

- Location within Västernorrland Location within Sweden Location within European Union
- Coordinates: 63°26′N 18°19′E
- Country: Sweden
- County: Västernorrland County
- Municipality: Örnsköldsvik Municipality

Area
  - Total: 2.33 km^{2} (0.90 sq mi)

Population (31 December 2018)
  - Total: 782
  - Density: 335/km^{2} (870/sq mi)
- Time zone: UTC+1 (CET)
  - Summer (DST): UTC+2 (CEST)

Mellansel ([ˈmɛ̂lːanˌseːl]) is a locality situated in Örnsköldsvik Municipality, Västernorrland County, Sweden with 827 inhabitants in 2010.

== History ==
Mellansel was first discovered by humans in 300 BC however Mellansel did not become a permanent settlement until the middle ages. Mellansel was first mentioned in books in the year 1523.

== Transportation ==
Mellansel became a railway junction when the railway line from Mellansel to Örnsköldsvik was opened to traffic on 1 November 1892. Since the night train traffic has been transferred to the Bothnia Line, no passenger trains have been running through Mellansel station since 2012.

Mellansel Airport (ICAO-code ESUI) is located 4 kilometers south of Mellansel. It opened on 1 July 1973 and no commercial flights operate of it as of 2020.

== Industry ==
The largest industry in Mellansel is Bosch Rexroth AB, which manufactures hydraulic drive systems.

== Society ==
There is a college and an outdoor swimming pool in the area. Some of the buildings on the college campus were named after Mellansel's cultural history.

== Population ==
In recent years, Mellansel has become a Population declining area (Swedish: Avfolkningsbygd).

Historical population in 5-year intervals, 1960–Present
Year	Pop.	±%
1960	745	—
1965	716	−3.9%
1970	1,323	+84.8%
1975	1,328	+0.4%
1980	1,353	+1.9%
1990	1,178	−12.9%
1995	1,038	−11.9%
2000	900	−13.3%
2005	823	−8.6%
2010	827	+0.5%
2015	825	−0.2%
2018	782	−5.2%
source		—

== Gallery ==
Town And Train Station

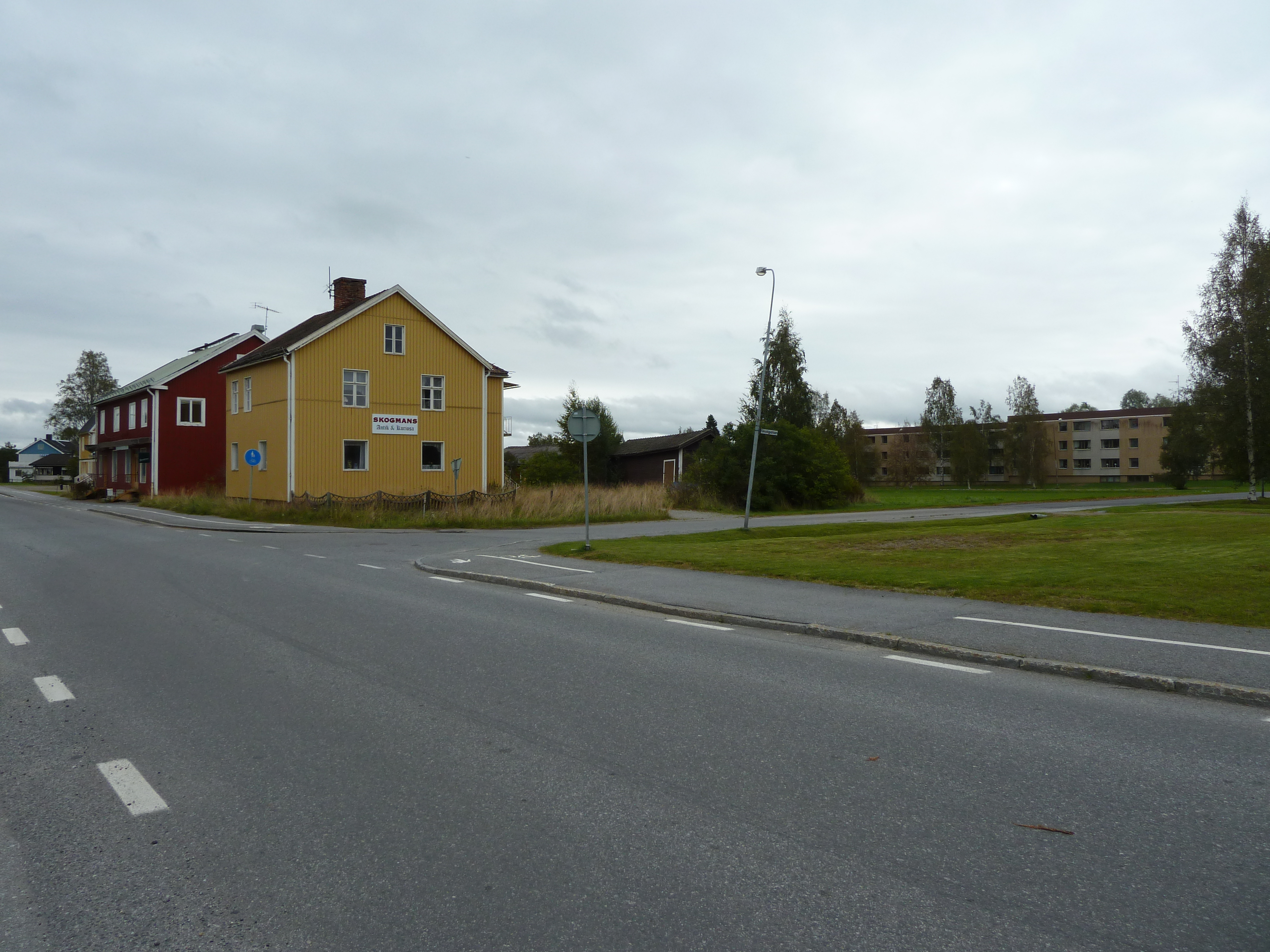

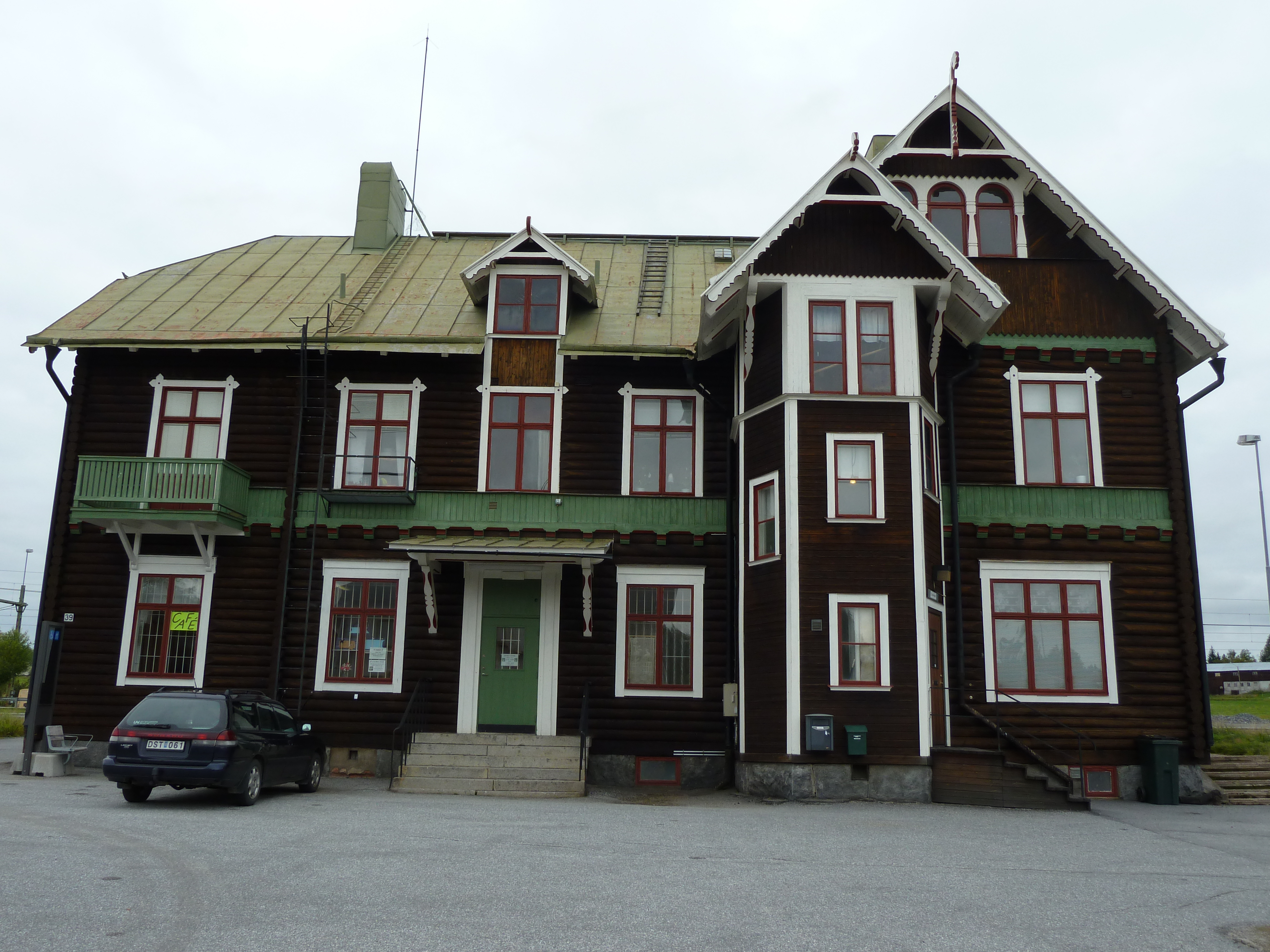

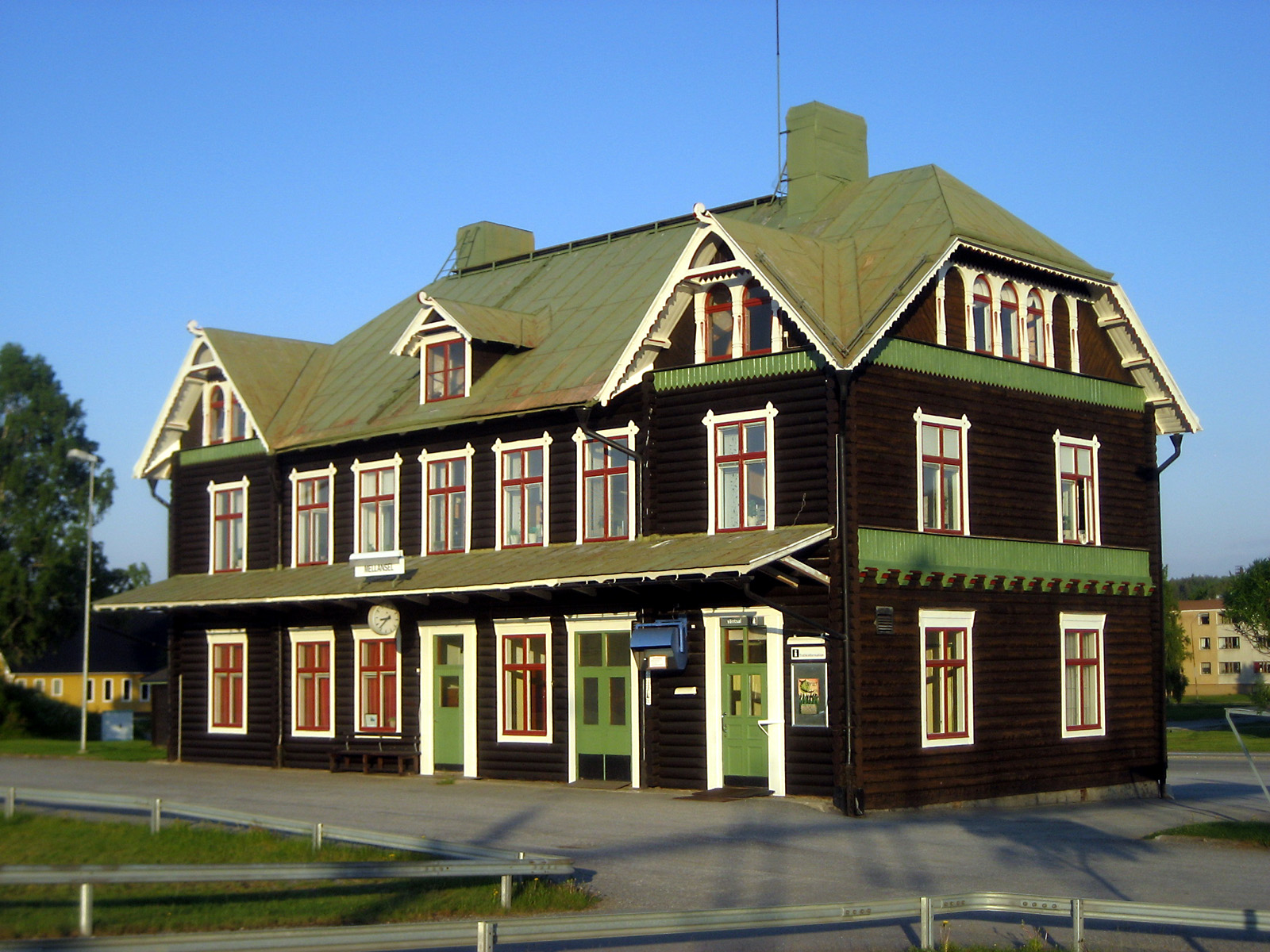
Bosch Rexroth Factory

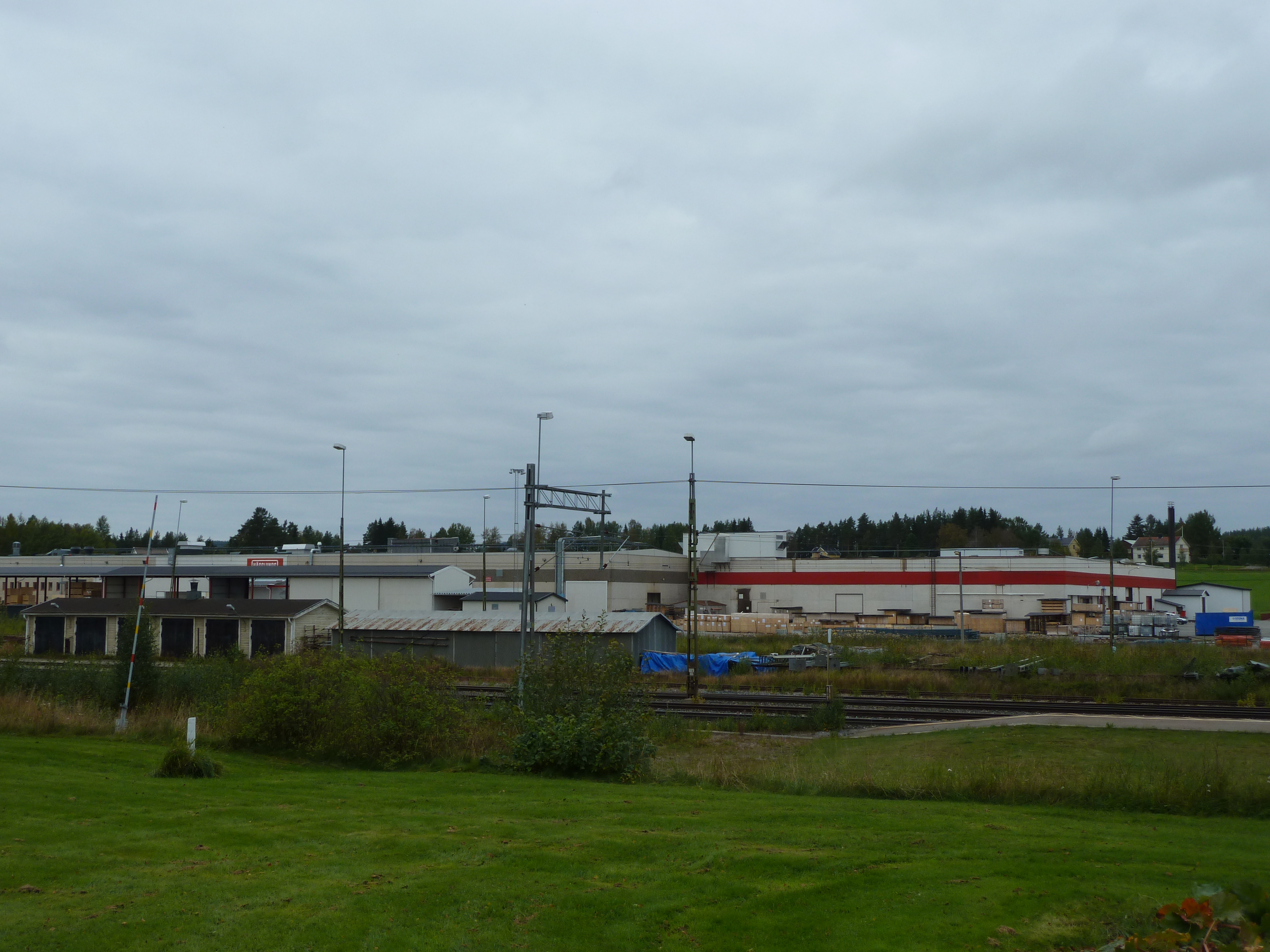

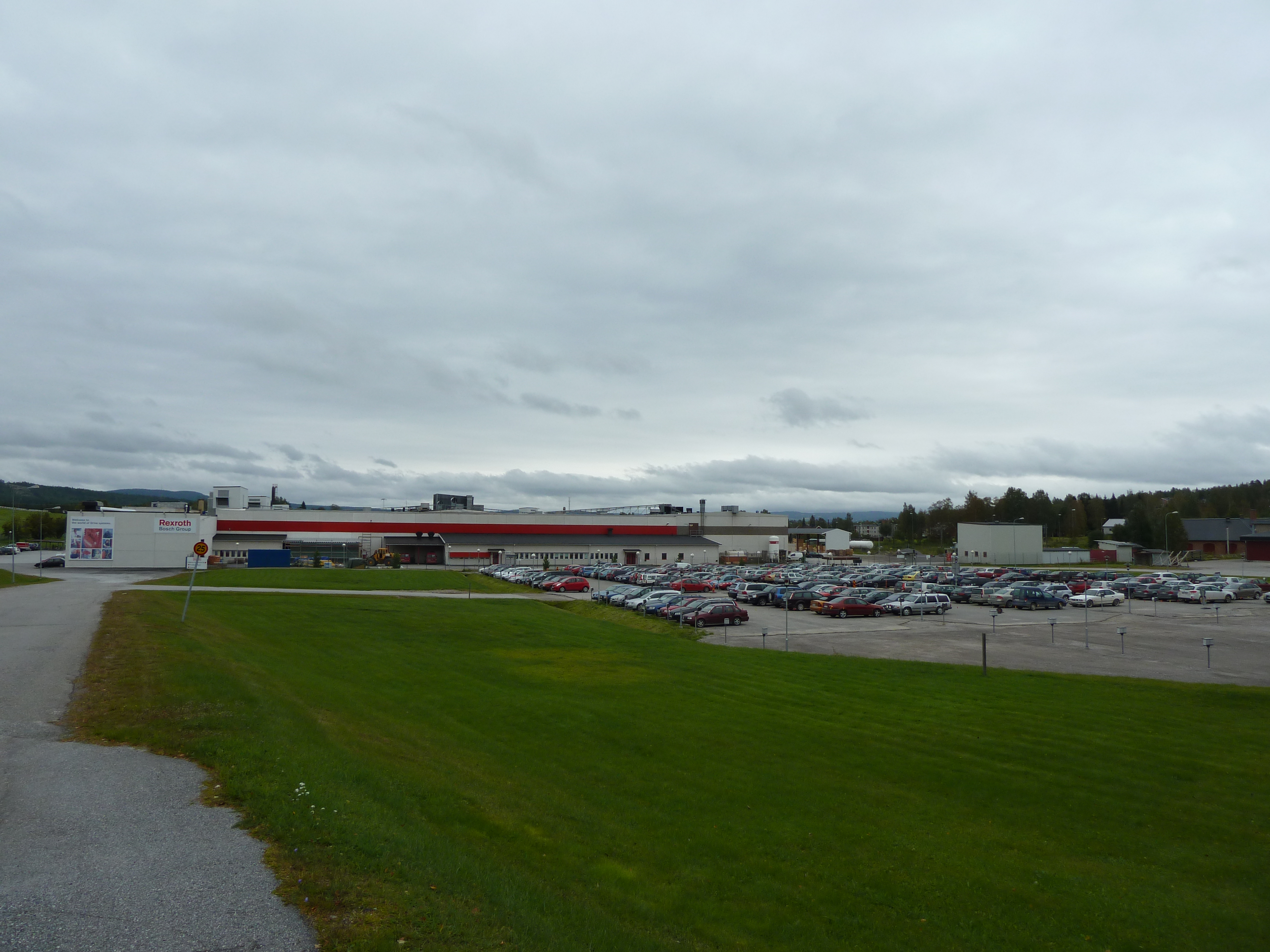

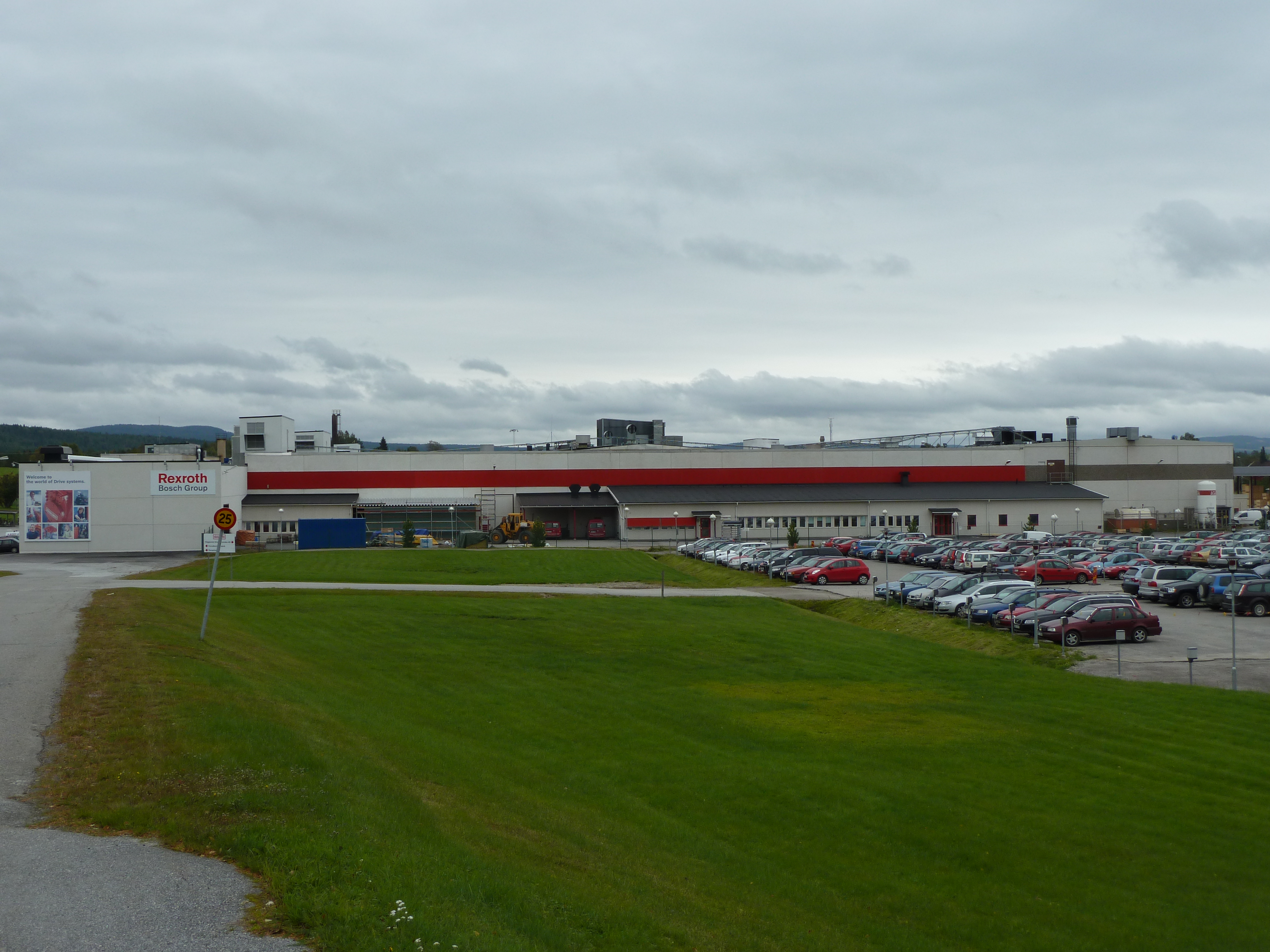
