= David Emanuel Wahlberg =

- Born: September 9, 1882; Ytterlännäs, Sweden
- Died: March 7, 1949 (aged 66); Fagersta, Sweden
- Education: University of Chicago (1904)
- Occupation: Sports writer
- Spouses: Jenny Katarina Wågberg (m. 1909–1927) Bertha Debora Engström (m. 1929–1949)
- Parent(s): Johanna Winblad (1859–1916); Per Olof Bernhard Wahlberg (1852–1927)
- Relatives: Frideborg Winblad, aunt

David Emanuel Wahlberg (September 9, 1882 – March 7, 1949) was a Swedish sports writer and editor who covered the 1912 Summer Olympics. He became president of the sports organization LAIF from 1937 to 1939. Later in life he was the Lutheran minister in Långsele, Sweden.

== Biography ==
He was born on September 9, 1882, in Ytterlännäs, Sweden to Johanna Winblad (1859–1916) and Per Olof Bernhard Wahlberg (1852–1927). He attended college in Sweden and graduated in 1901 then studied at the University of Chicago and received his Master of Arts in Romance 1904. He then attended Augustana College in 1905. He returned to Sweden and worked as a language teacher and journalist until 1916. He was ordained and then worked as a minister in Sundsvall. In 1923 or 1924 he became the pastor in Buenos Aires, Argentina. On September 15, 1927, his wife Jenny Katarina Wågberg died and on February 28, 1929, he left Argentina with his four children and returned to Sweden where he married his housekeeper, Bertha Debora Engström. He worked for a few different congregations until 1936 when he moved to Långsele. In 1942 he wrote A history of the Långsele parish school system: 1842-1942 with Torsten Sundvall and Urban Öland. Wahlberg died on March 7, 1949, in Fagersta, Sweden.

== Writings ==
- En krönika över Långsele sockens skolväsende (1942)
