= Örnsköldsvik Airport =

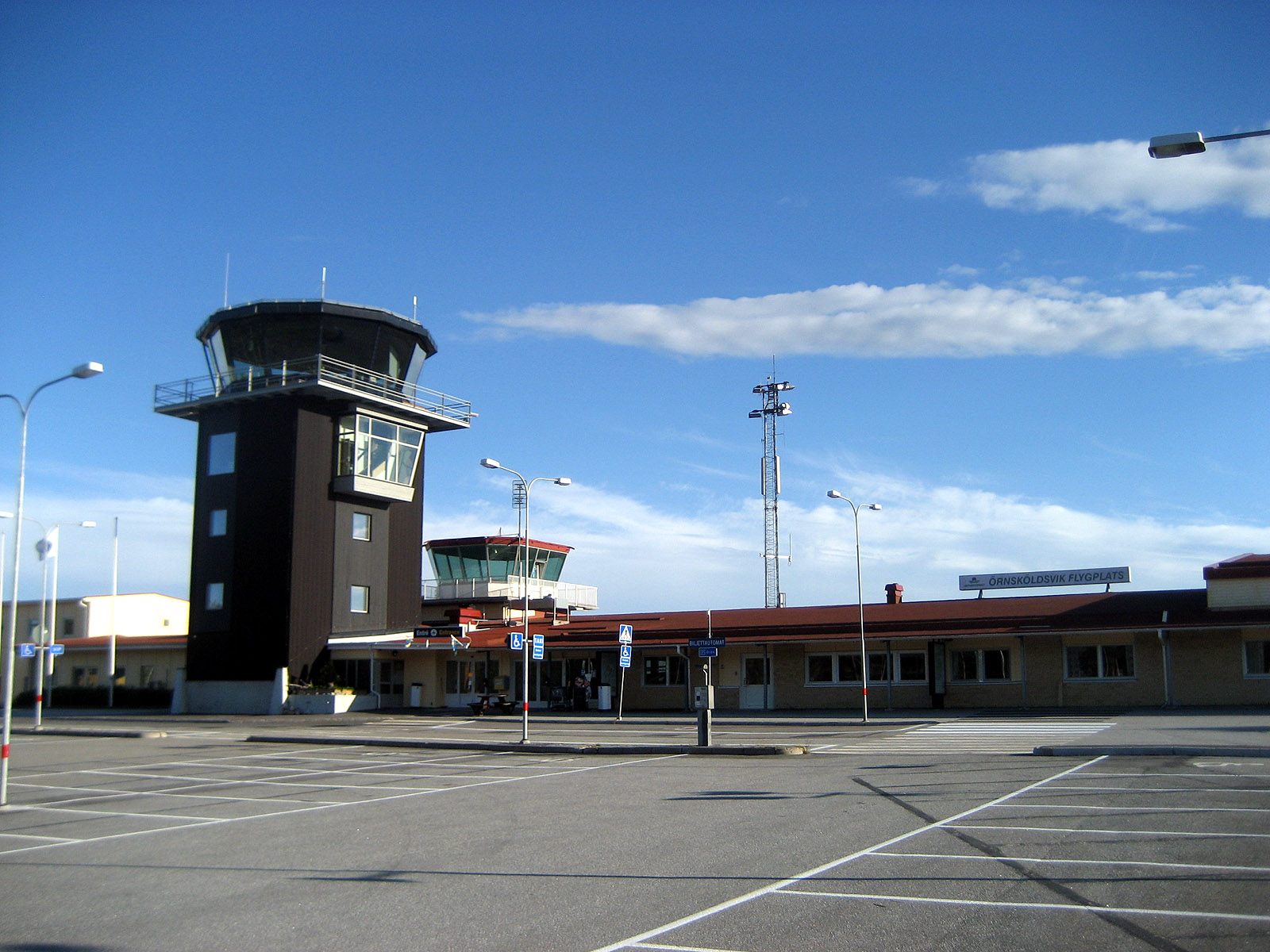
- IATA: OER; ICAO: ESNO

Summary
- Airport type: Public
- Operator: Municipality of Örnsköldsvik (since April 1, 2011)
- Location: Örnsköldsvik
- Elevation AMSL: 354 ft (108 m)
- Coordinates: 63°24′30″N 018°59′24″E

Map
- Location of airport in Sweden

Runways
Direction	Length		Surface
Direction	ft	m	Surface
12/30	6,607	2,014	Asphalt

Statistics (2016)
- Passengers total: 76,178
- International passengers: 3,230
- Domestic passengers: 72,948
- Landings total (2010): 1,416
- Statistics: Swedavia

Örnsköldsvik Airport (IATA: OER, ICAO: ESNO), is a regional airport located 24 km (15 mi) northeast of Örnsköldsvik, Sweden, at Husum, built in 1961.

== History ==
The airport had 80,123 passengers in 2013 and a record of 165,712 in 2000. On 31 October 2014, Örnsköldsvik airport received permission to have the first remote controlled air control tower in the world. The tower is controlled from Sundsvall-Timrå Airport.

== Airlines and destinations ==
The following airlines operate regular scheduled and charter flights at Örnsköldsvik Airport:

Airlines	Destinations
Enter Air	Seasonal charter: Chania, Rhodes

== Statistics ==
Annual passenger traffic
Year	Passengers	Annual change
2015	81,182	—
2016	76,178	▼6.16%
2017	71,535	▼6.09%
2018	89,562	▲25.20%
2019	85,541	▼4.49%
2020	14,976	▼82.50%
2021	5,792	▼61.33%
2022	10,419	▲79.89%
2023	28,003	▲168.77%
2024	30,690	▲9,60%
2025	26,809	▼12,65%
