= Köpmanholmen =

- Location within Västernorrland Location within Sweden
- Coordinates: 63°10′N 18°34′E
- Country: Sweden
- Province: Ångermanland
- County: Västernorrland County
- Municipality: Örnsköldsvik Municipality

Area
  - Total: 2.51 km^{2} (0.97 sq mi)

Population (31 December 2010)
  - Total: 1,237
  - Density: 492/km^{2} (1,270/sq mi)
- Time zone: UTC+1 (CET)
  - Summer (DST): UTC+2 (CEST)

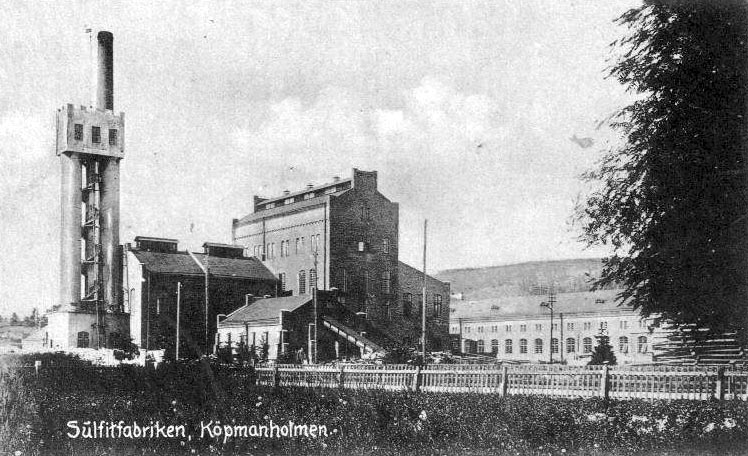
Sulfite factory in Köpmanholmen (~1920)

Köpmanholmen is a locality situated in Örnsköldsvik Municipality, Västernorrland County, Sweden with 1,237 inhabitants in 2010. The village is located about 25 kilometers southwest of Örnsköldsvik bordering the High Coast Archipelago World Heritage Site. In Köpmanholmen there is a grocery store, pre- and primary school year 1-6, swimming hall and sports hall. Formerly an industrial center with saw and pulp mills, the locality today only hosts a few small industries and many local residents commute to Örnsköldsvik. Köpmanholmen also has a ferry connection with Ulvön islands and Trysunda.
