= Solveig Hellquist =

Swedish politician (born 1949)

Solveig Hellquist (born January 31, 1949, in Björna, Örnsköldsvik, Västernorrland County), is a Swedish Liberal People's Party politician, who served as a member of the Riksdag from 2002 to 2010. She was the Chair of the Liberal women from 2006 to 2007.
