= Sidensjö =

- Sidensjö Church

- Location within Västernorrland Location within Sweden
- Coordinates: 63°18′N 18°18′E
- Country: Sweden
- Province: Ångermanland
- County: Västernorrland County
- Municipality: Örnsköldsvik Municipality

Area
  - Total: 1.05 km^{2} (0.41 sq mi)

Population (31 December 2010)
  - Total: 399
  - Density: 378/km^{2} (980/sq mi)
- Time zone: UTC+1 (CET)
  - Summer (DST): UTC+2 (CEST)

Sidensjö is a locality situated in Örnsköldsvik Municipality, Västernorrland County, Sweden with 399 inhabitants in 2010. It is also a parish in the Nätra Court District.

== History ==
Sidensjö Church

In 1915 the parish comprised 39,416 hectares. By that time Sidensjö was a church district in the Diocese of Härnösand and the northwest deanery of Ångermanland. The parish of Sidensjö today includes 33 smaller villages and covers an area of 389 square kilometres.

On January 1, 1952 a joint municipality was formed from the parishes of Sidensjö and Nätra. It was called Nätra municipality and was included into the Örnsköldsvik municipality in 1971.

Sidensjö is situated by Lake Bysjön, 23 kilometres west of Örnsköldsvik in Ångermanland. Sidensjö houses 1,191 inhabitants (2004). At the beginning of the 1900s the number of inhabitants was as high as 2500. In the centre of Sidensjö are Sidensjöskolan (grades 1-6 and preschool), Sidensjö Sparbank (a free-standing Swedbank bank), a grocery store, an outdoor ice hockey rink, the Sidensjö IK football pitches and the service house Fyrklövern with an old people’s home and nursery school.

Among the things worth seeing is the Sidensjö church, which was built in the 14th century and with that is one of the oldest in the Örnsköldsvik municipality. The church foundation was renovated in the early 1900s and many skeletons were uncovered below the church floor. Among the people buried was an embalmed 19th century priest and in the sacristy a young woman was found.

Just southeast of the church along road 908 towards Bjästa is the Sidensjö Village Hall where a café is open during summer. Next to the church is a hydroelectric power station that extracts energy from the Nätraån, a river with countless bends and sandbanks that is a popular place for canoe paddling. A popular tourist attraction is the “Bywatch” beach on the eastern shore of lake Bysjön along road 935 towards Örnsköldsvik, where there is a bridge, volleyball net and during summer a swim school.

Sidensjö has many active organizations and the biggest ones are IOGT-NTO (Swedish temperance organisation) and Sidensjö IK. Sidensjö IK is divided into several sections where the biggest ones are orienteering, cross-country skiing and football. In 1994 Sidensjö IK was responsible for organizing the first leg of the great orienteering competition called 'O-ringen 5-dagars'. The club was also the organizer of ‘Natt-SM in orienteering’ in 2004. During the 1980s Sidensjö had a women's football team participating in the Damallsvenskan national football league. The men’s team is, as of season 2007/2008, residing in Division 5. Youth activity has always been an important and major part in the club and this work has produced a number of players who now play in Division 2 Norrland.

In November 2003 Skanova installed ADSL in the Sidensjö telephone switch and is now available to most inhabitants through various ISPs.

== Notable people ==
- Niklas Edin, olympic gold medal winner, curling.
