= Åsa Domeij =

Swedish politician (born 1962)

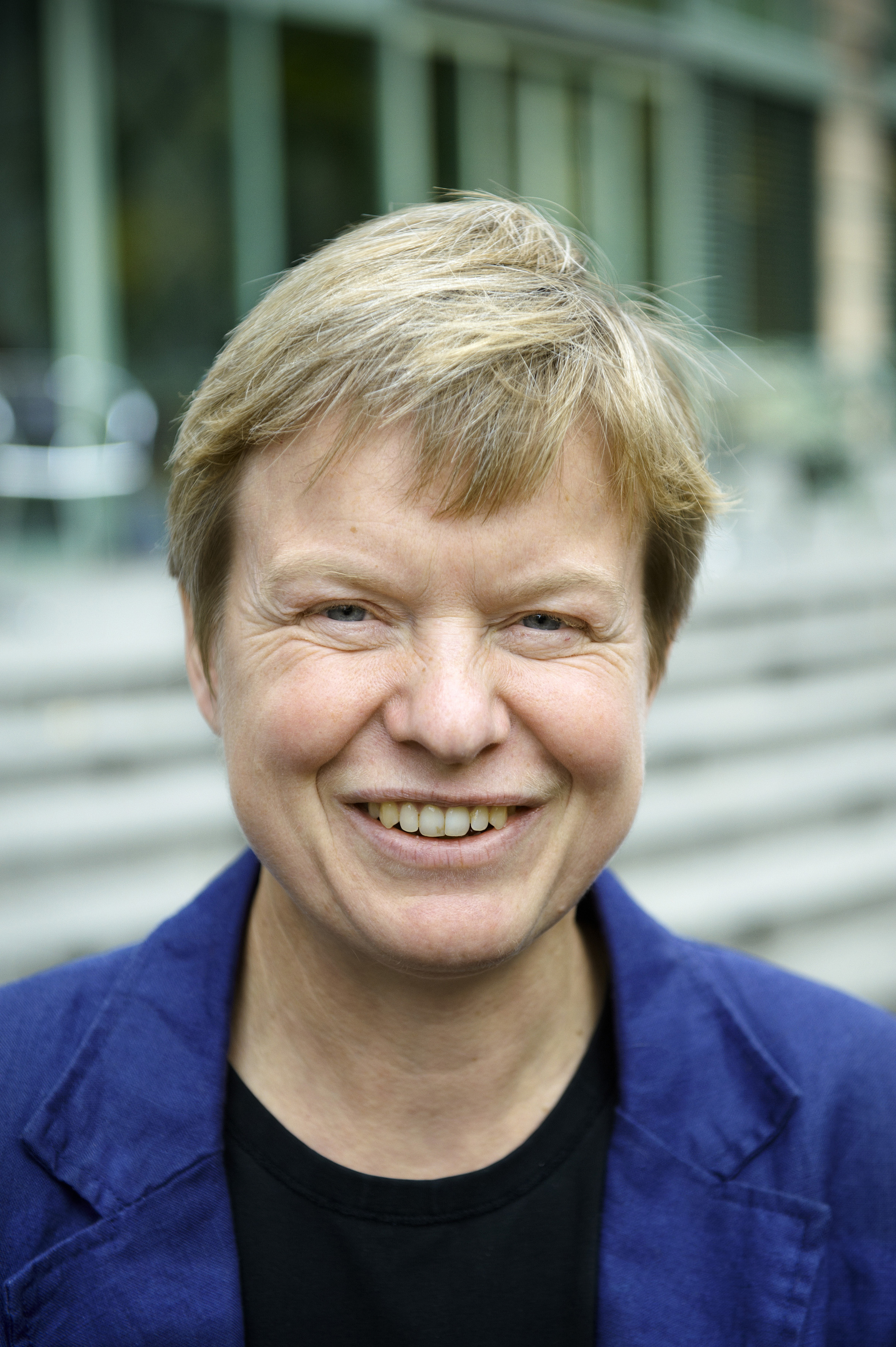
Portrait of Åsa Domeij

Åsa Domeij (born 29 April 1962, in Örnsköldsvik), is a Swedish Green Party politician and an agronomist by training. She was a member of the Riksdag from 1988 until 1991 and then again from 2002 until 2006.
