= Per Abraham Örnsköld =

Swedish aristocrat

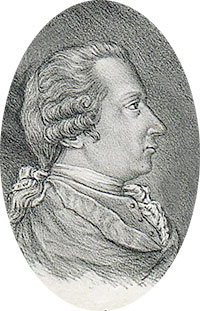
Per Abraham Örnsköld

Per Abraham Örnsköld (18 November 1720 – 16 April 1791) was a Swedish nobleman, with the title of friherre, whose notability in his country's history stems from his dedication to the able management of Sweden's regional subdivisions which he administered in his capacity as governor.

In 1762, the year of his forty-second birthday, he was appointed county governor of the vast Västernorrland County, which at that time consisted of the Medelpad, Ångermanland and Jämtland provinces.

Örnsköld realized the possibilities of the area and often travelled through it, by foot or using a carriage. He put to good advantage his knowledge about agriculture and city planning to found new settlements, thus relieving the old, overcrowded ones and, with the main goal of improving agriculture, provided aid for the farmers in trenching dikes, a procedure which they had previously found difficult to utilize. Among his other innovations was the introduction of new plants, including potato and flax, which quickly became popular; organizing the removal of stones from fields; commissioning maps of various parts of the region; opening pharmacies and myriad other improvements designed to help the inhabitants.

During the 1769 session of the Riksdag, opponents attacked his self-decided reforms, claiming he made them to glorify himself. They also made accusations that he enriched himself through embezzlement. Although Örnsköld instituted several drastic reforms, some of which were arbitrary, his accusers were known to have acted with political motives as well as envy. Ultimately, Örnsköld was not punished, but rather transferred to govern Nyköping County, a part of the larger Södermanland County, where he continued his pattern of vigorously instituting reforms. In 1771 he was again accused of unlawful actions, but historical records do not indicate that he suffered any adverse consequences.

Per Abraham Örnsköld died in Nyköping at the age of 70. His previous county of administration, Västernorrland, has kept his memory and honoured it with various publications. The town of Örnsköldsvik, founded in 1842, fifty-one years after his death, was named after him.

== See also ==
- List of Västernorrland Governors
