= Mikael Bohman =

Swedish ice hockey player

- Born: January 23, 1979 (age 47) Örnsköldsvik Sweden
- Height: 5 ft 10 in (178 cm)
- Weight: 174 lb (79 kg; 12 st 6 lb)
- Position: Goaltender
- Shoots: Left
- SEL team: Färjestads BK
- Playing career: 1997–present

Mikael Bohman (born January 23, 1979) is a professional ice hockey goaltender. He is currently a back-up goaltender for Färjestads BK in the Swedish Elite League behind Daniel Henriksson and Christopher Heino-Lindberg. Bohman signed with Färjestad on January 31, 2007. Before signing with Färjestad has he played in the Swedish second league Allsvenskan mostly for IFK Arboga and some games for Skellefteå AIK. He spent the 1999/00 season in Norway playing for the Storhamar Dragons.
