= Anundsjö IF =

Swedish football club

- Full name: Anundsjö Idrottsförening
- Founded: 1921; 104 years ago
- Ground: Olympia; Bredbyn; Sweden
- Capacity: 2,000
- Coach: Robert Bergström; Johnny Dahlbäck
- League: Division 3 Mellersta Norrland
- 2019: Division 2 Norrland, 14th (Relegated)
- Website: http://www.anundsjoif.se
| Home colours | Away colours |

Anundsjö IF is a Swedish football club located in Bredbyn outside Örnsköldsvik. The club, formed in 1921, is currently playing in the fourth highest Swedish league, Division 2. The club is affiliated to the Ångermanlands Fotbollförbund.

== Season to season ==
| Season | Level | Division | Section | Position | Movements |
|---|---|---|---|---|---|
| 1993 | Tier 4 | Division 3 | Mellersta Norrland | 9th | |
| 1994 | Tier 4 | Division 3 | Mellersta Norrland | 5th | |
| 1995 | Tier 4 | Division 3 | Norra Norrland | 5th | |
| 1996 | Tier 4 | Division 3 | Mellersta Norrland | 8th | |
| 1997 | Tier 4 | Division 3 | Mellersta Norrland | 3rd | |
| 1998 | Tier 4 | Division 3 | Mellersta Norrland | 9th | |
| 1999 | Tier 4 | Division 3 | Mellersta Norrland | 8th | |
| 2000 | Tier 4 | Division 3 | Mellersta Norrland | 12th | Relegated |
| 2001 | Tier 5 | Division 4 | Ångermanland | 1st | Promoted |
| 2002 | Tier 4 | Division 3 | Mellersta Norrland | 6th | |
| 2003 | Tier 4 | Division 3 | Mellersta Norrland | 1st | Promoted |
| 2004 | Tier 3 | Division 2 | Norrland | 9th | |
| 2005 | Tier 3 | Division 2 | Norrland | 5th | Promotion play-off – Promoted |
| 2006* | Tier 3 | Division 1 | Norra | 13th | Relegated |
| 2007 | Tier 4 | Division 2 | Norrland | 5th | |
| 2008 | Tier 4 | Division 2 | Norrland | 4th | |
| 2009 | Tier 4 | Division 2 | Norrland | 9th | |
| 2010 | Tier 4 | Division 2 | Norrland | 5th | |
| 2011 | Tier 4 | Division 2 | Norrland | 4th | |
| 2012 | Tier 4 | Division 2 | Norrland | 2nd | |
| 2013 | Tier 4 | Division 2 | Norrland | 2nd | |
| 2014 | Tier 4 | Division 2 | Norrland | 3rd | |
| 2015 | Tier 4 | Division 2 | Norrland | 8th | |
| 2016 | Tier 4 | Division 2 | Norrland | 12th | Relegation Playoffs |

* League restructuring in 2006 resulted in a new division being created at Tier 3 and subsequent divisions dropping a level.

== Attendances ==
In recent seasons Anundsjö IF have had the following average attendances:

| Season | Average attendance | Division/section | Level |
|---|---|---|---|
| 2005 | 444 | Div 2 Norrland | Tier 3 |
| 2006 | 515 | Div 1 Norra | Tier 3 |
| 2007 | 412 | Div 2 Norrland | Tier 4 |
| 2008 | 376 | Div 2 Norrland | Tier 4 |
| 2009 | 362 | Div 2 Norrland | Tier 4 |
| 2010 | 343 | Div 2 Norrland | Tier 4 |
| 2011 | 347 | Div 2 Norrland | Tier 4 |
| 2012 | 340 | Div 2 Norrland | Tier 4 |
| 2013 | 501 | Div 2 Norrland | Tier 4 |

* Attendances are provided in the Publikliga sections of the Svenska Fotbollförbundet website.
