= Anundsjö parish =

Parish in Västernorrland, Sweden

Coordinates: 63°26′43″N 18°7′3″E

Anundsjö parish is a parish in the Diocese of Härnösand in Sweden.

== History ==
The Anundsjö church is located in the community of Bredbyn in Örnsköldsvik Municipality and has a detached belltower.

== Notable inhabitants ==
- Eilert Pilarm, Elvis impersonator
- Peter Artedi or Petrus Arctaedius (1705–1735), naturalist
- Frideborg Winblad, educator and administrator
