= Husum, Sweden =

Husum
- Location within Västernorrland Location within Sweden
- Coordinates: 63°20′N 19°10′E
- Country: Sweden
- Province: Ångermanland
- County: Västernorrland County
- Municipality: Örnsköldsvik Municipality

Area
  - Total: 3.99 km^{2} (1.54 sq mi)

Population (31 December 2010)
  - Total: 1,647
  - Density: 413/km^{2} (1,070/sq mi)
- Time zone: UTC+1 (CET)
  - Summer (DST): UTC+2 (CEST)

Husum is a locality situated in Örnsköldsvik Municipality, Västernorrland County, Sweden with 1,647 inhabitants in 2010.

It is located close to the northern entrance to the High Coast. It has an active sports club in Husums IF (ice hockey, soccer, wrestling, ski jumping, cross-country skiing, orienteering, etc.), and a very active entrepreneurial spirit with many small local businesses, including a famous bakery. The Husum Big Band, a wind instrument orchestra that dates back to the early 1900s, is still active - playing in concerts both locally and regionally. The Grundsunda Framtidsgrupp is an association formed in 1995 to promote the interests of the local inhabitants.

The Husum Paper mill and Sulphate pulp mill is the main employer in the area, and has been a significant influence on the municipality since it was founded in 1919 by Mo och Domsjö AB ("Modo" for short, see also Modo Hockey). Metsä Board of Finland (previously known as M-Real and Metsä-Serla) acquired the mill in 2000.

Situated close to both the sea and the mountains, Husum has two rivers (Husån and Gideälven) flowing into the municipality. It was a perfect location for a sawmill, bringing timber to the mill by floating them downstream. This sawmill was the origin of the current paper and pulp mill. Husum is very close to the regional airport at Gideå, and a station for the new rail line Botniabanan has just been built close to the center of municipality.
