= Peter Artedi =

Swedish zoologist (1705–1735)

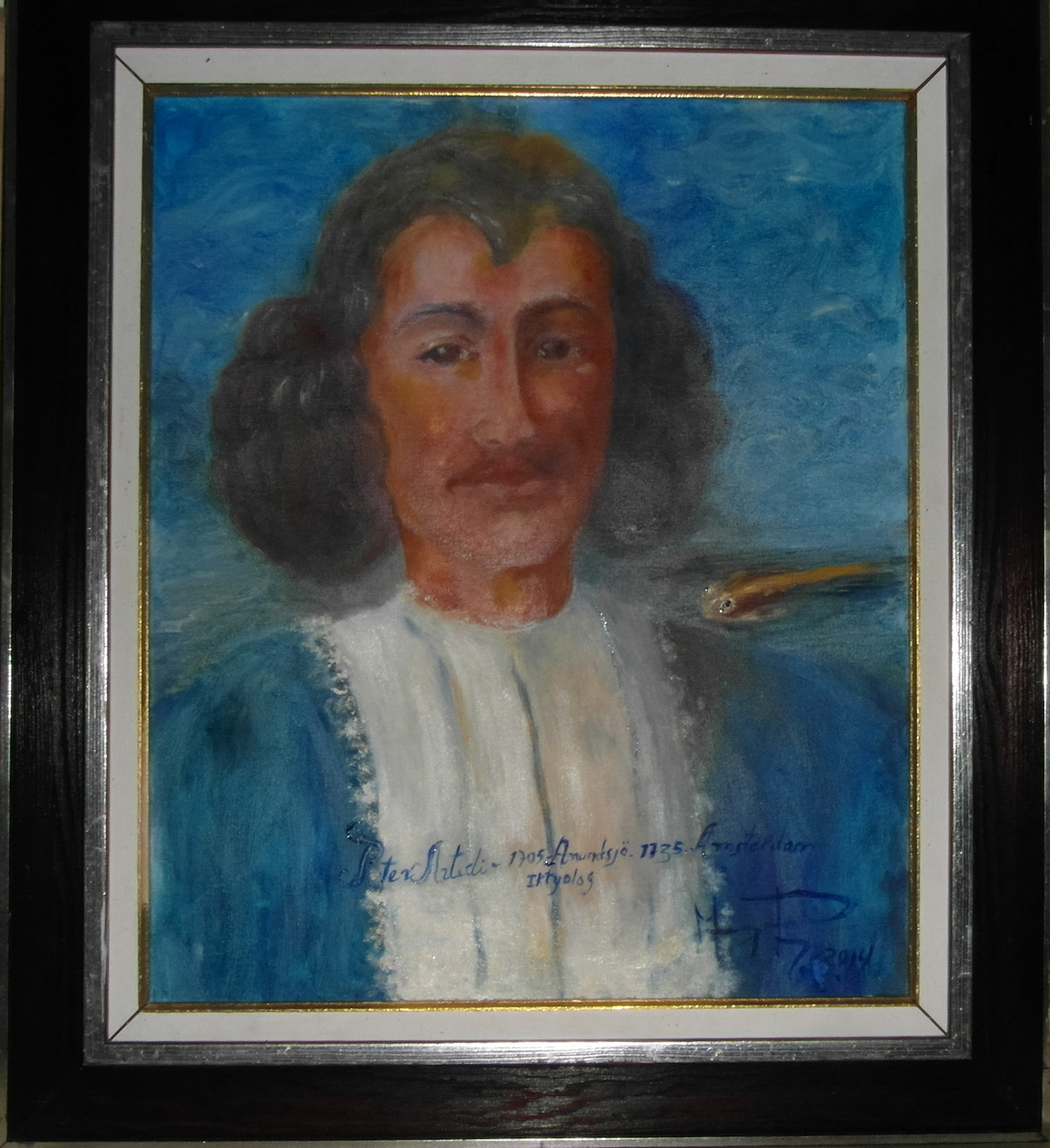
- Peter Artedi, a painting by the artist Mary Pinzón, how he might have looked
- Born: Peter Artedi; 27 February 1705; Anundsjö, Ångermanland, Sweden
- Died: 28 September 1735 (aged 30); Amsterdam
- Education: Uppsala University
- Known for: Pioneer ichthyologist
- Scientific career
- Patrons: Albertus Seba
- Author abbrev. (zoology): Artedi, Arctaedius, Art.

Peter Artedi or Petrus Arctaedius (27 February 1705 – 28 September 1735) was a Swedish naturalist and collaborator of Carolus Linnaeus. He is sometimes known as the "father of ichthyology" for his pioneering work in classifying the fishes into groups.

== Life and work ==
Artedi was born in Anundsjö in the province of Ångermanland. His paternal grandfather Petrus Martini was the son of a farmer and lived in Hiske (now Umeå). Petrus Martini went to the Royal Academy of Åbo and became a minister in the Church of Sweden. He adopted the Latin surname Archtaedius, becoming vicar in Nordmaling. Artedi's father Olaus Petri also went to Åbo but spelt his surname as Arctaedius. He eventually succeeded the position of his father at Nordmaling. He was married to Helena Sidenia and they had five children of whom only three survived. Petrus Artedi, the second of these three, followed the family tradition and intending to become a clergyman, he went after schooling in Härnösand, in 1724, to study theology at Uppsala University, but he turned his attention to medicine and natural history, especially ichthyology, a science that he influenced greatly. In 1728 his countryman Carl Linnaeus arrived in Uppsala, and a lasting friendship was formed between the two from 1729 (as Artedi was away in 1728 due to the death of his father). In 1732, Professor Lars Roberg published a thesis that contained a section which was declared as alchemical and it was disapproved of by the theology faculty. The professor was censured and it would appear that Artedi may have also been affected as Linnaeus had noted Artedi's interest in alchemy. Artedi lost his Stipendium Regium at any rate and in 1732 he left Uppsala, as did Linnaeus. Artedi left for England, and Linnaeus for Lapland; and before parting they reciprocally bequeathed to each other their manuscripts and books, agreeing to finish each other's work in the event of one predeceasing the other.

In 1734 Artedi visited England, mentioning a whale in London in November downstream of the London Bridge, and a meeting with Hans Sloane. Artedi left London in summer 1735 and met Linnaeus in Leiden. Artedi was short of money and Linnaeus introduced him to Albertus Seba, a wealthy Dutchman, who had formed what was perhaps the richest museum of his time in Amsterdam. Seba employed Artedi to write descriptions of fishes for his Thesaurus. On the night of 27 September, while returning from Seba's home to his lodgings, he accidentally fell and drowned in a canal. His body was found the next day. Linnaeus heard of the death through Claudius Sohlberg two days later and rushed to Amsterdam. According to their agreement, his manuscripts came into the hands of Linnaeus, and his Bibliotheca Ichthyologica and Philosophia Ichthyologica, together with a life of the author, were finished and published by Linnaeus at Leiden in 1738 under the title Ichthyologia sive opera omnia de piscibus.

Artedi was buried in a grave in St Anthony's churchyard in Amsterdam on October 1735. His grave was never marked and the churchyard site has since been appropriated for other purposes. An epitaph, written in Latin by Anders Celsius, and translated into English by George Shaw, is known because it was inscribed on the back flyleaf of Linnaeus's own copy of Ichthyologia:

Here lies poor Artedi, in foreign land pyx'd
Not a man nor a fish, but something betwixt,
Not a man, for his life among fishes he past,
Not a fish, for he perished by water at last.

A memorial stone to Peter Artedi was erected in Amsterdam Zoological Gardens and unveiled on 28 June 1905; it is inscribed in Latin. Other stone memorials are in Anundsjö and Nordmaling in Sweden.

Linnaeus named Artedia (Apiaceae), a monotypic genus from the eastern Mediterranean, after his friend.
