= Bredbyn =

- Location within Västernorrland Location within Sweden
- Coordinates: 63°27′N 18°06′E
- Country: Sweden
- Province: Ångermanland
- County: Västernorrland County
- Municipality: Örnsköldsvik Municipality

Area
  - Total: 2.34 km^{2} (0.90 sq mi)

Population (31 December 2010)
  - Total: 1,186
  - Density: 506/km^{2} (1,310/sq mi)
- Time zone: UTC+1 (CET)
  - Summer (DST): UTC+2 (CEST)

Bredbyn is a locality situated in Örnsköldsvik Municipality, Västernorrland County, Sweden. It had 1,186 inhabitants in 2010.

== Sports ==
The following sports clubs are located in Bredbyn:

- Anundsjö IF
