= Romelsön =

Island in the country of Sweden

- Location within Sweden

Geography
- Coordinates: 64.877776°N 21.277758°E
- Adjacent to: Bay of Bothnia
- Area: 10 km^{2} (3.9 sq mi)

Administration
- Sweden
- County: Västerbotten
- Municipality: Skellefteå Municipality

Demographics
- Population: Uninhabited

Romelsön, is an island in the north of the Swedish sector of the Bay of Bothnia, in the Skellefteå archipelago.

== Location ==
Romelsön is the second largest island in the Skellefteå Municipality. Despite its location, the island is owned by Piteå Municipality. It is about 10 kilometres (6.2 mi) south of Byske on the mainland, just east of the smaller island of Halsön. The island is separated from the mainland by a narrow channel. Because the land is rising due to post-glacial rebound the island is slowly growing and the channel becoming narrower. Romelsön is 4.5 kilometres (2.8 mi) long and 1.9 kilometres (1.2 mi) wide. The highest elevation is about 30 metres (98 ft) above sea level. The island is used as an outdoor recreation destination, accessible by boat. There are about ten cottages on the north side.

== History ==
There is archaeological evidence that the island was an important fishing center in Viking times. In 1890 a bronze object shaped like the head of an animal was found in a rubble field. The find was not reported until 1952, and the exact site of the find was unknown, but it was thought to be a burial mound. The object was the end of a strap fitting. Based on similar objects found elsewhere that can be dated, the object is from the first half of the 11th century. There is a maze from the same period. The foundation of a house has been found that may have been used by fishermen, seal hunters and merchants around that time.

The island is mentioned in 1543 in the Jordabok (Land book) of King Gustav Vasa as "Rumholsöijarne", owned by the farmers of Ostvik. Queen Christina (1626–1689) gave the island and fishing grounds to the burghers of Piteå in 1652. In the 18th and 19th century the largest fishing village on the coast developed, but there were no more than 20 fishing cottages. There were also boathouses and drying racks for fishing nets.

== Environment ==
The environment is diverse. There are sparse pine forests, coastal spruce forest and small regions of spruce-dominated swamp forest, lakes and wetlands, meadows and sedge marshes. The island is fringed by sand beaches with dunes, shingle beaches and rocks. Some of the shallow bays are flads evolving into gloe lakes. The island is rich in bird species, including rare and endangered species.

Most of the island is used for commercial forestry, but there is a small strip of virgin forest along the south and southeast, mostly on rocky ground. These are the oldest undisturbed forests in the Skellefteå archipelago and in Västerbotten County. The old forest is sparse, made up of pines around 200–300 years old, with much dead wood. The eastern part includes huge pines four hundred year old or more. The old forest supports an impressive number of rare or regionally endangered species of fungi. It is recognized as of high conservation value for the fungi, and to some extent for its vascular plants and birds. As of 2003 there was no formal protection.

== See Also ==
- List of islands of Sweden
