= Gerhard Gerhardsson =

Swedish religious leader (1792–1878)

- Born: July 1792; Fällfors, Byske parish, Sweden
- Died: March 1878 (aged 85–86); Burträsk parish, Sweden
- Occupations: Preacher, craftsman
- Movement: Läsare (Reader) movement, Schartauism
- Spouse: Magdalena Larsdotter (m. 1824)
- Children: 6

Gerhard Gerhardsson (2 or 14 July 1792 – 3 or 9 March 1878) was a Swedish craftsman and religious leader.

== Biography ==
=== Upbringing and spiritual awakening ===
Gerhard Gerhardsson was born in Fällfors, Byske parish, Västerbotten, Sweden, to farmer Gerdt Nilsson and Cathrina Andersdotter. He was raised in a Pietist Old Reader (läsare) religious environment. Gerhardsson never attended school but learned to read and write on his own.

His confirmation left him feeling a spiritual calling and in late 1814, in his early 20s, he experienced a religious crisis. A booklet made him concerned, which had recently been published and was circulating in the area, entitled Allvarlig förmaning till alla rättsinniga kristna att vakta sig för falsk lärdom men i synnerhet för Per Tollessons skrifter ('Serious admonition to all right-minded Christians to beware of false doctrine, but especially of the writings of Per Tollesson'). On New Year's Eve, he underwent a dramatic spiritual experience lasting nine days in which he read the Bible and believed he was alternately in heaven and hell. He later described himself during this time as "not crazy like other madmen."

=== Leader of the New Readers ===
Along with farmer and religious leader Anders Larsson in Norrlångträsk, he became a leader of the New Reader (nyläsare) movement in the Skellefteå area. He was known to be zealous and argumentative, forcefully speaking out against what he considered false.

At a time when religious gatherings other than those of the Church of Sweden were unlawful, the Moravian Church (Herrnhuters) had begun to have a substantial influence on the growing religious revivals, particularly in the Norrland region. Through their influence, Gerhardsson started to focus on faith as the basis for justification, and salvation being entirely dependent on God's grace. He disagreed in part with Lutheran theologian Johann Arndt's True Christianity, ending in a dispute with two local priests.

=== Conflict, reaction by officials ===
The New Reader movement continued to grow as he traveled through much of Västerbotten preaching. In 1818, the Readers filed complaints to the diocese about the clergy in Skellefteå. Priest Olof Hambræus was instructed by Bishop Erik Abraham Almqvist to meet with them, allowing them to ask questions. Despite his lack of official schooling, Gerhardsson brought a statement of faith he had written expounding on the New Readers' beliefs, consisting of 22 articles on 24 pages, based on the format of the Augsburg Confession. Hambræus in the end sided with his colleagues. Almqvist, while politically supporting fines for the Readers, maintained a conciliatory tone and opposed stronger measures against them.

The year after, 1819, Larsson and Gerhardsson stood trial in the Skellefteå Church (Skellefteå landsförsamlings kyrka) for rebellious activity and disobedience to priests, bishops and the service order, and for violating the Conventicle Act. Gerhardsson was said to have called for a "new reformation" and the abolition of the current form of church as well as stating regarding priest Pehr (Per) Tollesson, "as surely as God is God, Per Tollesson is in hell." The controversy only led to additional growth of the movement. The movement was investigated at the king's request by Josua Sylvander, Supreme Court justice and Moravian. Like Bishop Almqvist, he took a conciliatory tone, speaking with the movement's leaders. Due to Sylvander's efforts, starting in 1820 they were again allowed to assemble for devotions on Sundays and holidays; however, their own interpretation of the biblical text was not allowed. Gerhardsson's efforts eventually led to the abolition of the provisions of the Conventicle Act for Västerbotten. On 9 January 1822, King Charles XIV John decreed that the provisions of the Conventicle Act were no longer to apply to the Readers there. As long as they did not gather during public worship services, they were allowed to hold their own devotions and individual meetings.

=== Family ===
In 1824 he married Magdalena Larsdotter; the couple had six children.

=== Shift towards Schartauism, later life ===
In the early 1820s, the Readers began to use the Moravian Brethren hymnals Sions sånger and Sions nya sånger. These hymnals, written partly in protest of the Church of Sweden's hymnal, were initially smuggled into the country in the late 1700s. The Moravians at the time had a strong emotional emphasis and focus on the wounds and blood of Jesus. The two hymnals contained songs of this nature and the latter a number of songs by radical Moravian preacher Anders Carl Rutström. Gerhardsson became critical of the sentimental aspect of the New Reader movement. He believed it led to a false Christianity due to a lack of focus on the struggle against sin. He struggled with the New Readers' "hyperevangelism" and instead placed a strong emphasis on repentance and sanctification. He eventually distanced himself significantly from the New Readers.

In 1828 Gerhardsson moved to Bygdsiljum in Burträsk. Pietist preacher Anders Rosenius worked in Burträsk as assistant vicar starting in 1834. His son, the later influential preacher Carl Olof Rosenius, met Gerhardsson at some point and spoke to him about spiritual matters. Gerhardsson began to study Pietist priest Henric Schartau's writings, becoming a follower by the 1840s. Schartau too had been a strong proponent of Moravian beliefs but later broke with the group and their focus on sentimentality as he found a more intellectual version of faith. Like Schartau, Gerhardsson also became strongly opposed to ecclesiastical separatism, which found some support among the New Readers. He believed the church's order, given by God, must be upheld despite any issues with church leadership.

Around this time, in opposition to the state church separatist New Reader Johan Riström had amassed followers and founded his own congregation in which he held mass, heard confessions, and confirmed and baptized children. Gerhardsson thus denounced Riström and referred to his followers as an "entourage of Satan".

He became a strong promoter in the region of Schartau's work and gained a number of new followers after having lost some of his previous followers. Carl Olof Rosenius would later lament Gerhardsson's turn towards Schartauism in a letter to Finnish priest Fredrik Gabriel Hedberg. Likewise, Gerhardsson felt Rosenius had gone in the wrong direction to some extent. However, the two remained on good terms personally.

Gerhardsson's "edifying or polemical" work Samlade skrifter, a collection of nine writings, was published in 1877. He died the following year in Burträsk parish, Västerbotten. His influence remained in the area for some time as well as in other parts of Sweden.
