= Halsön =

Halsön may refer to:

- Halsön, Kalix, an island in the Kalix archipelago of the Bothnian bay
- Halsön, Skellefteå, an island in the Skellefteå archipelago the Bothnian bay
- Halsön, Korsnäs, an island in the Kvarken (Quark) archipelago in the Bothnian Sea
- Hälsö, an island in Västra Götaland County, Sweden
