= Henric Schartau =

Swedish priest (1757–1825)

- Priest
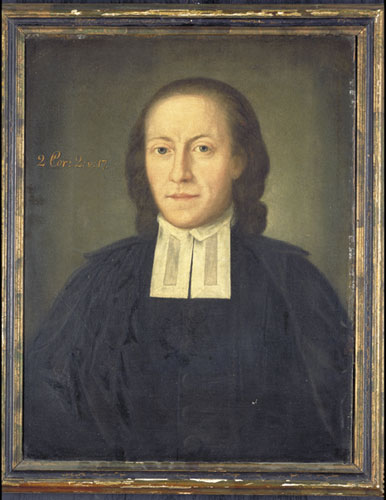
- Portrait of Henric Schartau by Martin David Roth, 1797.
- Church: Church of Sweden

Orders
- Ordination: 1780

Personal details
- Born: 27 September 1757 Malmö, Sweden
- Died: 3 February 1825 (aged 67) Lund, Sweden
- Buried: Norra kyrkogården, Lund
- Spouse: Catharina (Cajsa) Elisabeth Sommelius (m. 1786)
- Education: Lund University

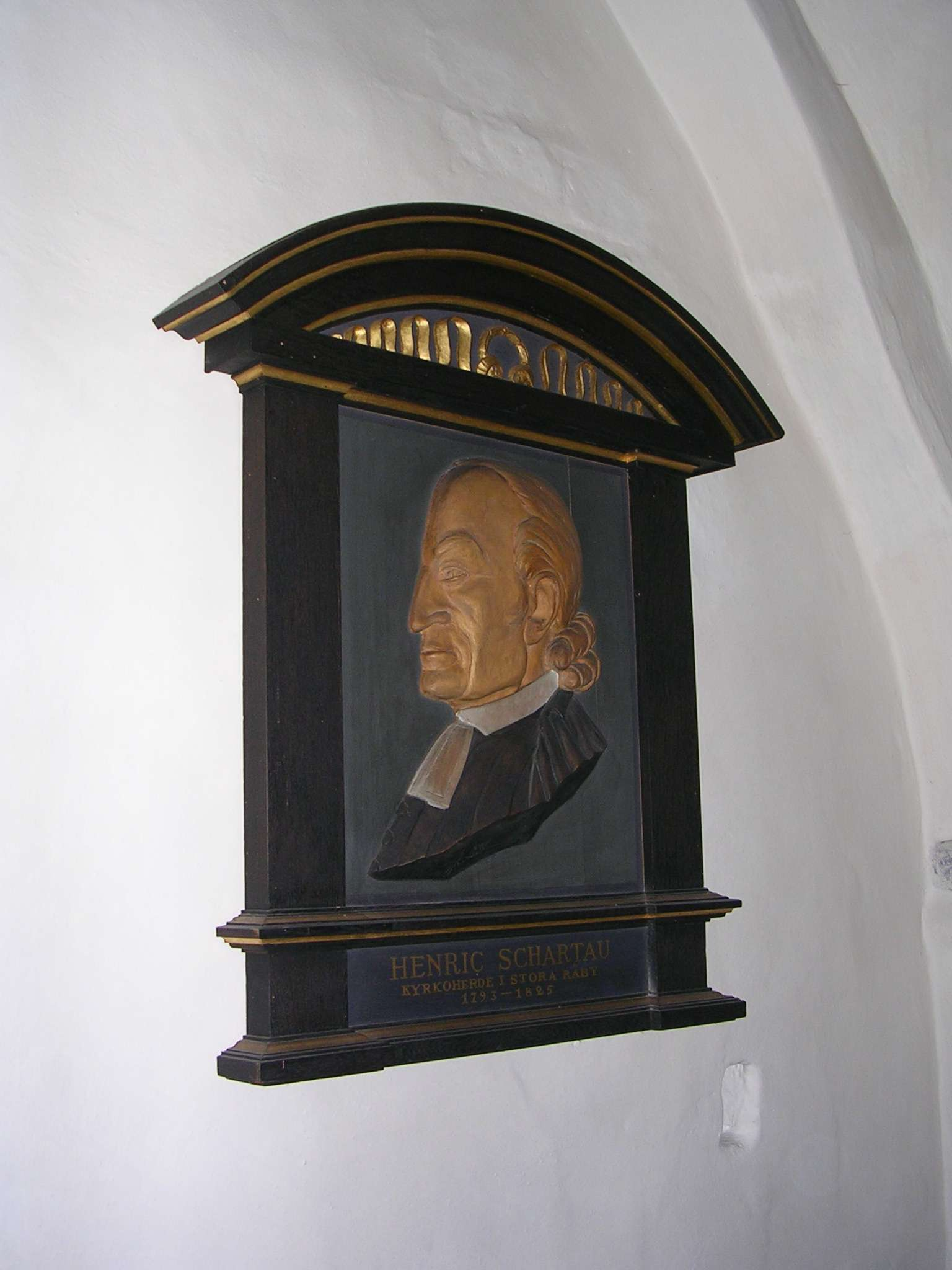
Portrait of Henric Schartau in Stora Råby Church outside Lund.

Henric Schartau (27 September 1757 – 3 February 1825) was a Swedish Lutheran pietistic priest. His theology, including his characteristic teachings on the "order of grace", influenced a revivalist movement known as Schartauanism.

== Biography ==
Schartau was born in Malmö in 1757. His father was a member of Riksdag (Parliament); his mother died from black fever when he was thirteen. Schartau's father then pushed for him to be allowed to graduate at the age of 14 so he could attend university. His father later died after difficult political and financial circumstances. Schartau's paternal grandfather was the vicar of Sörby, Jöns Schartau (1684–1754), who took his surname from Skartofta, the village where he was born. His maternal grandfather was Henric Falkman (1701–1767), mayor of Malmö. He remembered his maternal grandfather as being a positive religious influence on him, later writing: "In my associations with him I soon experienced the sweetness of being in the house of my heavenly Father. This experience helped to bring me back, after I had for some time during my youth drifted away."

Schartau studied at Lund University and graduated with a bachelor's degree in philosophy in 1774. At the age of twenty, he went through a religious crisis. Christian Scriver's Seelen-Schatz ('The Soul's Treasure') played a role in helping him through it, which led him to a focus on the Bible; he then went through a period in which he was influenced by Moravian teachings.

In 1778 he received his master's degree. In 1780 he was ordained a priest in Kalmar, where he served as house preacher to Privy Councillor Christopher Falkengréen and as a private instructor at Danerum in Ryssby. After serving as a military chaplain, he became second assistant vicar (komminister) at Lund Cathedral in 1785. On 22 November 1786 he married Catharina (Cajsa) Elisabeth Sommelius.

Schartau's beliefs were pietistic along the lines of August Hermann Francke and Philipp Spener. By 1787, however, Schartau found himself a harsh critic of Moravianism and its emotionalism as well as its separatism. He believed in staying within the bounds of the existing state church and in a more intellectual form of faith. His faith was influenced by Martin Luther, Johann Arndt, Magnus Friedrich Roos, Johann Albrecht Bengel, and Anders Nohrborg.

In 1793 he became assistant vicar at the cathedral and vicar of Bjällerup and Stora Råby parishes in Scania, southern Sweden, a post he held until his death. He also served as rural dean.

Schartau became renowned for his harsh and strict sermons, which came to influence several young priests, many of them in the Diocese of Gothenburg. His teachings spread especially in southern and southwestern Sweden, known as the Schartauan revival. In the United States they were influential in western Maine.

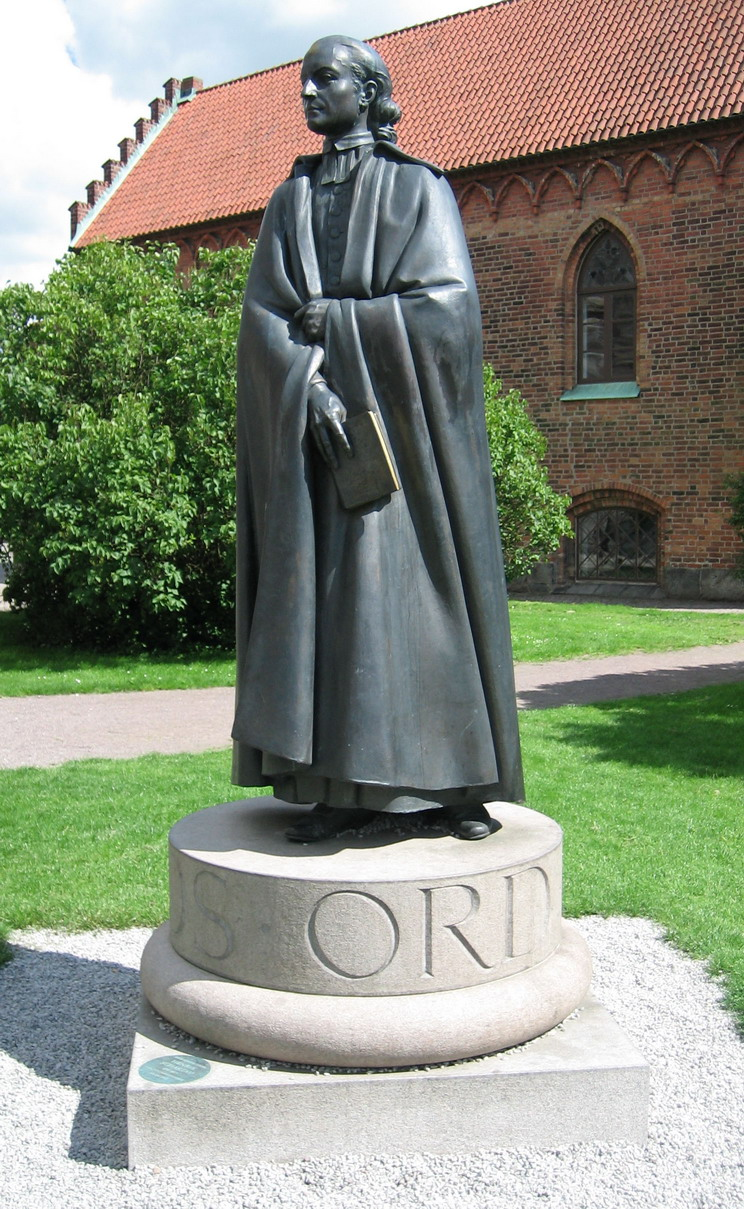
Henric Schartau beside Lund Cathedral.

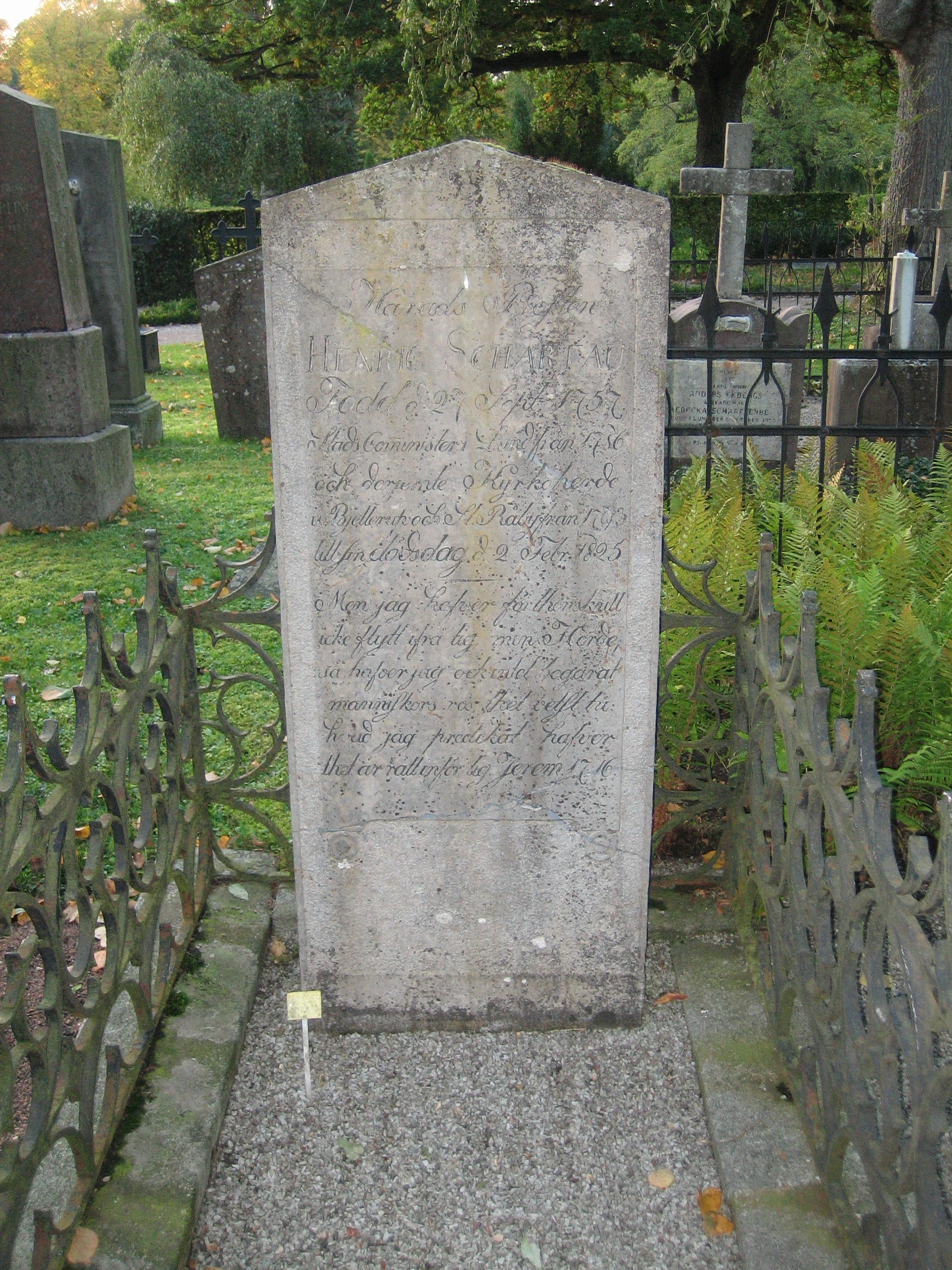
Henric Schartau's grave in Lund.

He gathered audiences from all walks of life, although professors were initially largely absent from his services and hearings. In time, however, several of them came to be counted among his disciples, including Mattias Fremling, Arvid Florman, Johan Holmbergson, Carl Johan Schlyter, Johan Henrik Holmqwist and Gustav Leonard Dahl.

His influence extended to preachers such as Gerhard Gerhardsson, Peter Fjellstedt, and those in the free church movement such as Lars Vilhelm Henschen. Some well-known Swedish bishops like Bo Giertz have also been influenced by Schartauan teachings.

Schartau died in 1825 in Lund.

Due to his work in Stora Råby, a relief carved by Henning Åkerman was erected in Stora Råby Church in 1937. However, he is buried at Norra kyrkogården in Lund. Schartau also has a statue located at Lund Cathedral. The statue, made by sculptor Peter Linde, was a gift to the Cathedral Council received by Christina Odenberg and unveiled on 31 October 2003 by Archbishop K. G. Hammar. However, plans for a statue had existed for most of the 20th century.

== Selected works ==
- Utkast till predikningar af Henric Schartau ... Utgifna efter hans död. 1-2. Stockholm. 1827–1828.
- Bref i andeliga ämnen af Henrick Schartau utgifna efter hans död. Stockholm. 1828–1830.
- Undervisning i christendomskunskapen : twänne utförligare äldre arbeten. Stockholm: Bredberg. 1835.
- Predikningar: till större delen i utförligare utkast. Vol. 1–4. Stockholm: Huldberg. 1843–1861.
- Utkast till offentliga förhör, tillika med afhandlingar i frågor och swar öfwer några stycken af christendomskunskapen. Lund: Gleerup. 1850.
- Femton predikningar och ett skriftermålstal (4th ed.). Lund. 1859.
- Postilla öfwer kyrkoårets gamla högmessotexter samt passionspredikningar. Örebro. 1865.
- Predikningar, skriftermål och confirmationstal : utgifna efter hans död. Sista samlingen (2nd ed.). Lund: Gleerup. 1878.
- Evangeliepredikningar. Stockholm: Svenska kyrkans diakonistyrelses bokförlag. 1930.
- Evangeliepostilla. Lund: Gleerup. 1937.
- Johannesson, Lechard, ed. (1955). Henric Schartaus biblisk cateches. Stockholm: Studiebokförlag.
- Johnson, Knut; Wikman, Nils, eds. (1963–1974). Hittills otryckta predikningar och tal: jämte en översikt över tidigare tryckta predikningar och tal. Vol. 1–4. Lund: Gleerup.
- Den allvarliga salighetssaken: utkast och predikningar. Language modernized by Henrik Nelson. Gothenburg: Lutherstiftelsen. 1997.
