= Halsön (Skellefteå) =

Island in Sweden

- Location within Sweden

Geography
- Coordinates: 64.882232°N 21.244699°E
- Adjacent to: Bay of Bothnia
- Area: 10 km^{2} (3.9 sq mi)

Administration
- Sweden
- Province: Västerbotten
- Municipality: Skellefteå Municipality

Demographics
- Population: Uninhabited

Halsön, or Halsögrund, is an island in the north of the Swedish sector of the Bay of Bothnia, in the Skellefteå archipelago. It includes the formerly separate island of Granön, so is sometimes called Halsön-Granön.

== Location ==
Halsön is about 10 kilometres (6.2 mi) south of Byske on the mainland, just west of the larger island of Romelsön. Between 1870 and 1903 there was a steam sawmill on the island. The Byske boat club has their clubhouse on the island. There is a marina with 30 berths, a sauna, and the clubhouse with a kitchen.

== Environment ==
Halsön is covered by forest plantations, but has three bays of environmental interest. Kvällsmålsviken is in the shoal area between Romelsön and Halsön, surrounded by fine meadows and coastal hardwood. Granöviken also has coastal hardwood that has rich bird life. The bay at Furuskogen has valuable stonewort. These flads are very productive due to naturally high levels of nutrients, ample light and relatively warm water, supporting rich fauna and flora. They are important reproduction and nursery areas for fry and small fish, and provide nesting and rest areas for many bird species. Some of the species in this environment, such as stoneworts, are also rare and in some cases threatened.
