= Gerhardsson =

Gerhardsson is a patronymic surname, literally meaning "son of Gerhard". Notable people with the surname include:

- Birger Gerhardsson (1926–2013), Swedish Biblical scholar
- Gerhard Gerhardsson (1792–1878), Swedish preacher
- Peter Gerhardsson (born 1959), Swedish footballer and manager
