= Bygdeträsk =

- Location within Västerbotten Location within Sweden
- Coordinates: 64°25′26″N 20°33′3″E
- Country: Sweden
- Province: Västerbotten
- County: Västerbotten County
- Municipality: Skellefteå Municipality

Population (2004)
  - Total: 84
- Time zone: UTC+1 (CET)
  - Summer (DST): UTC+2 (CEST)

Bygdeträsk is a small village in Skellefteå Municipality, Västerbotten County, Sweden with 84 inhabitants in 2004.

Here lies the largest lake in Västerbotten County called Great Bygdeträsket. Great Bygdeträsket has an area of 29.2 square kilometers and a watervolume of 399.7 cubic metres. The maximum depth, of Great Bygdeträsket, is 50.0 meters and an average depth of 13.7 meters.
