= Flad =

Flad may refer to:

- Flad Architects, American architectural firm
- Egon Flad, German soccer player and sports agent
- Henry Flad, German civil engineer
- Flad (lagoon), A stage in the formation of a Gloe lake
