= Kusmark =

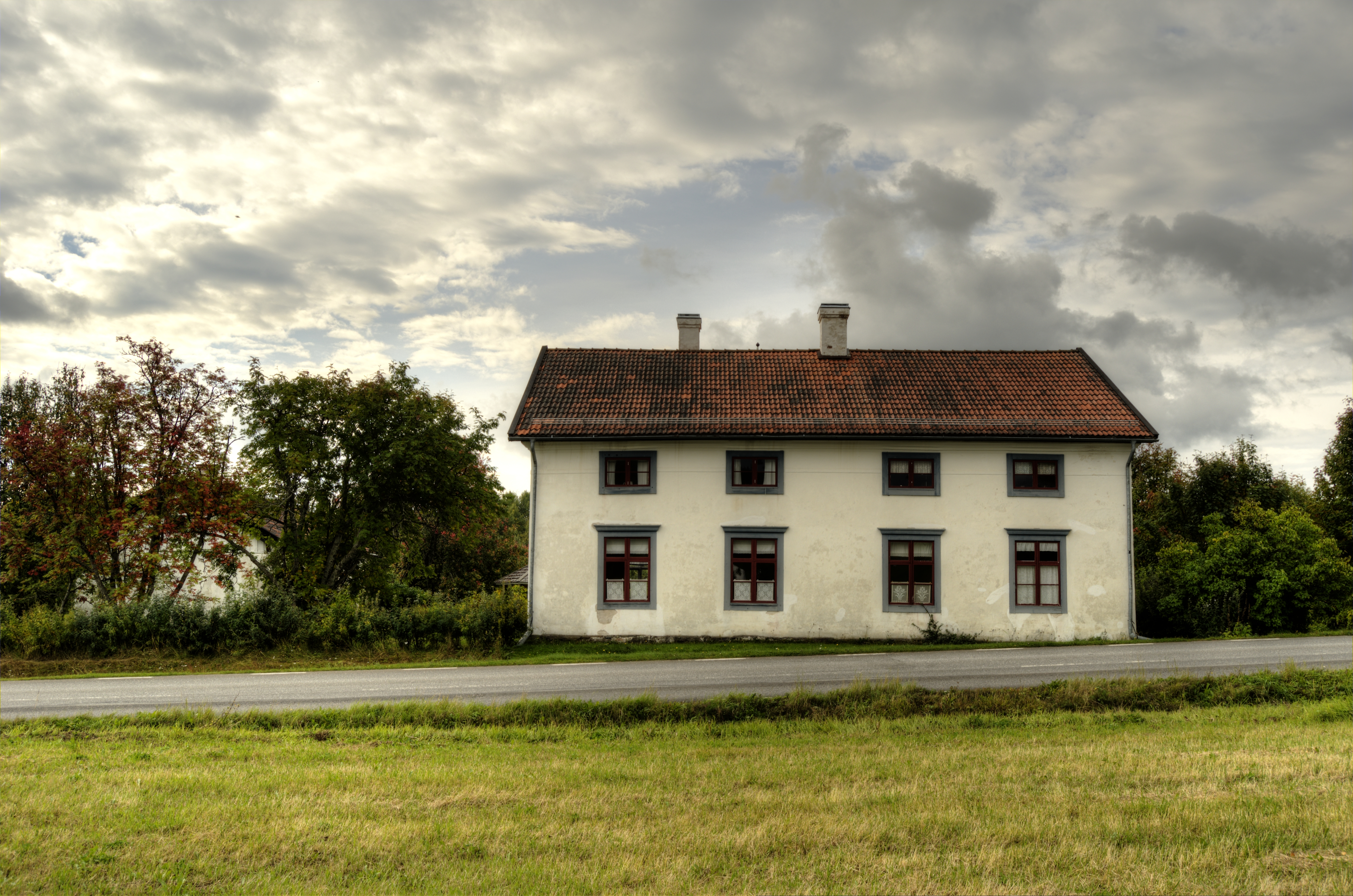

- Location within Västerbotten Location within Sweden
- Coordinates: 64°53′N 20°48′E
- Country: Sweden
- Province: Västerbotten
- County: Västerbotten County
- Municipality: Skellefteå Municipality

Area
  - Total: 1.15 km^{2} (0.44 sq mi)

Population (31 December 2010)
  - Total: 441
  - Density: 384/km^{2} (990/sq mi)
- Time zone: UTC+1 (CET)
  - Summer (DST): UTC+2 (CEST)

Kusmark is a locality situated in Skellefteå Municipality, Västerbotten County, Sweden with 441 inhabitants in 2010.

== Notable natives ==
- Viktor Arvidsson, ice hockey player for the Boston Bruins
- Pär Lindholm, ice hockey player for Skellefteå AIK. Former player for the Boston Bruins
