= Örviken =

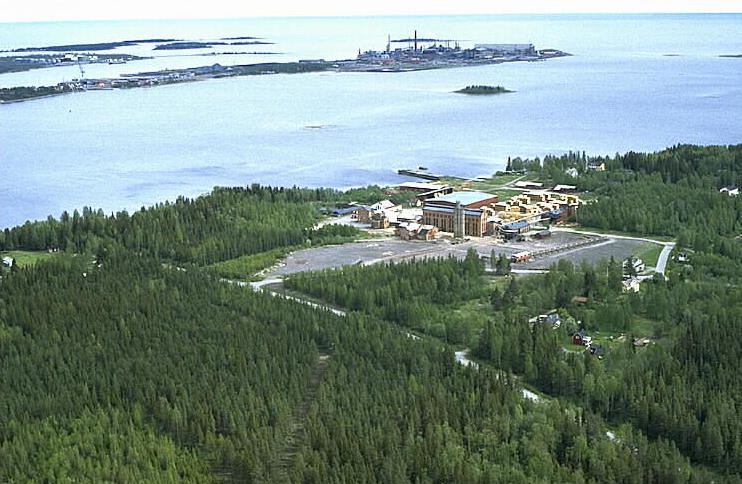

- Location within Västerbotten Location within Sweden
- Coordinates: 64°41′N 21°12′E
- Country: Sweden
- Province: Västerbotten
- County: Västerbotten County
- Municipality: Skellefteå Municipality

Area
  - Total: 0.99 km^{2} (0.38 sq mi)

Population (31 December 2010)
  - Total: 395
  - Density: 400/km^{2} (1,000/sq mi)
- Time zone: UTC+1 (CET)
  - Summer (DST): UTC+2 (CEST)

Örviken is a locality situated in Skellefteå Municipality, Västerbotten County, Sweden with 395 inhabitants as of the 2010 census.
