= Burträsk =

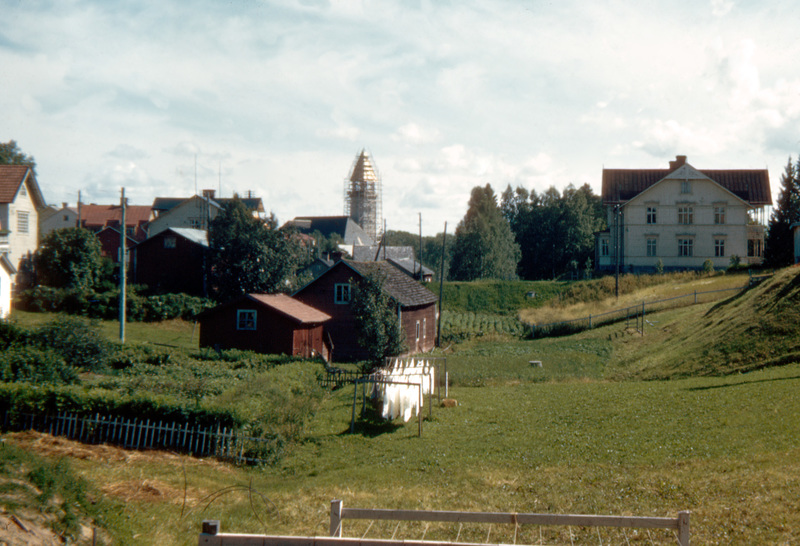
- Burträsk in 1949

- Location within Västerbotten Location within Sweden
- Coordinates: 64°31′N 20°39′E
- Country: Sweden
- Province: Västerbotten
- County: Västerbotten County
- Municipality: Skellefteå Municipality

Area
  - Total: 1.84 km^{2} (0.71 sq mi)

Population (31 December 2019)
  - Total: 1,606
  - Density: 854/km^{2} (2,210/sq mi)
- Time zone: UTC+1 (CET)
  - Summer (DST): UTC+2 (CEST)

Burträsk is a locality situated in Skellefteå Municipality, Västerbotten County, Sweden with 1,575 inhabitants in 2010. It is notable as the only place where Västerbotten cheese is made.

Burträsk Court District, or Burträsks tingslag, was a district of Västerbotten in Sweden. The provinces in Norrland were never divided into hundreds and instead the court district (tingslag) served as the basic division of rural areas.

Burträsk Fault is named after the village.

== People ==
- Edvin Larsson (1925–2009), theologian.
