= Bergsbyn =

- Location within Västerbotten Location within Sweden
- Coordinates: 64°44′N 21°04′E
- Country: Sweden
- Province: Västerbotten
- County: Västerbotten County
- Municipality: Skellefteå Municipality

Area
  - Total: 1.38 km^{2} (0.53 sq mi)

Population (31 December 2010)
  - Total: 1,780
  - Density: 1,292/km^{2} (3,350/sq mi)
- Time zone: UTC+1 (CET)
  - Summer (DST): UTC+2 (CEST)

Bergsbyn is a locality situated in Skellefteå Municipality, Västerbotten County, Sweden with 1,780 inhabitants in 2010.
