= Medle =

- Location within Västerbotten Location within Sweden
- Coordinates: 64°45′N 20°44′E
- Country: Sweden
- Province: Västerbotten
- County: Västerbotten County
- Municipality: Skellefteå Municipality

Area
  - Total: 1.44 km^{2} (0.56 sq mi)

Population (31 December 2010)
  - Total: 552
  - Density: 383/km^{2} (990/sq mi)
- Time zone: UTC+1 (CET)
  - Summer (DST): UTC+2 (CEST)

Medle is a locality situated in Skellefteå Municipality, Västerbotten County, Sweden with 552 inhabitants in 2010.
