= Södra Bergsbyn och Stackgrönnan =

- Location within Västerbotten Location within Sweden
- Coordinates: 64°43′N 21°05′E
- Country: Sweden
- Province: Västerbotten
- County: Västerbotten County
- Municipality: Skellefteå Municipality

Area
  - Total: 0.80 km^{2} (0.31 sq mi)

Population (31 December 2010)
  - Total: 393
  - Density: 493/km^{2} (1,280/sq mi)
- Time zone: UTC+1 (CET)
  - Summer (DST): UTC+2 (CEST)

Södra Bergsbyn och Stackgrönnan is a locality situated in Skellefteå Municipality, Västerbotten County, Sweden, with 393 inhabitants in 2010.
