= Korsnäs =

- Municipality
- Korsnäs kommun Korsnäsin kunta
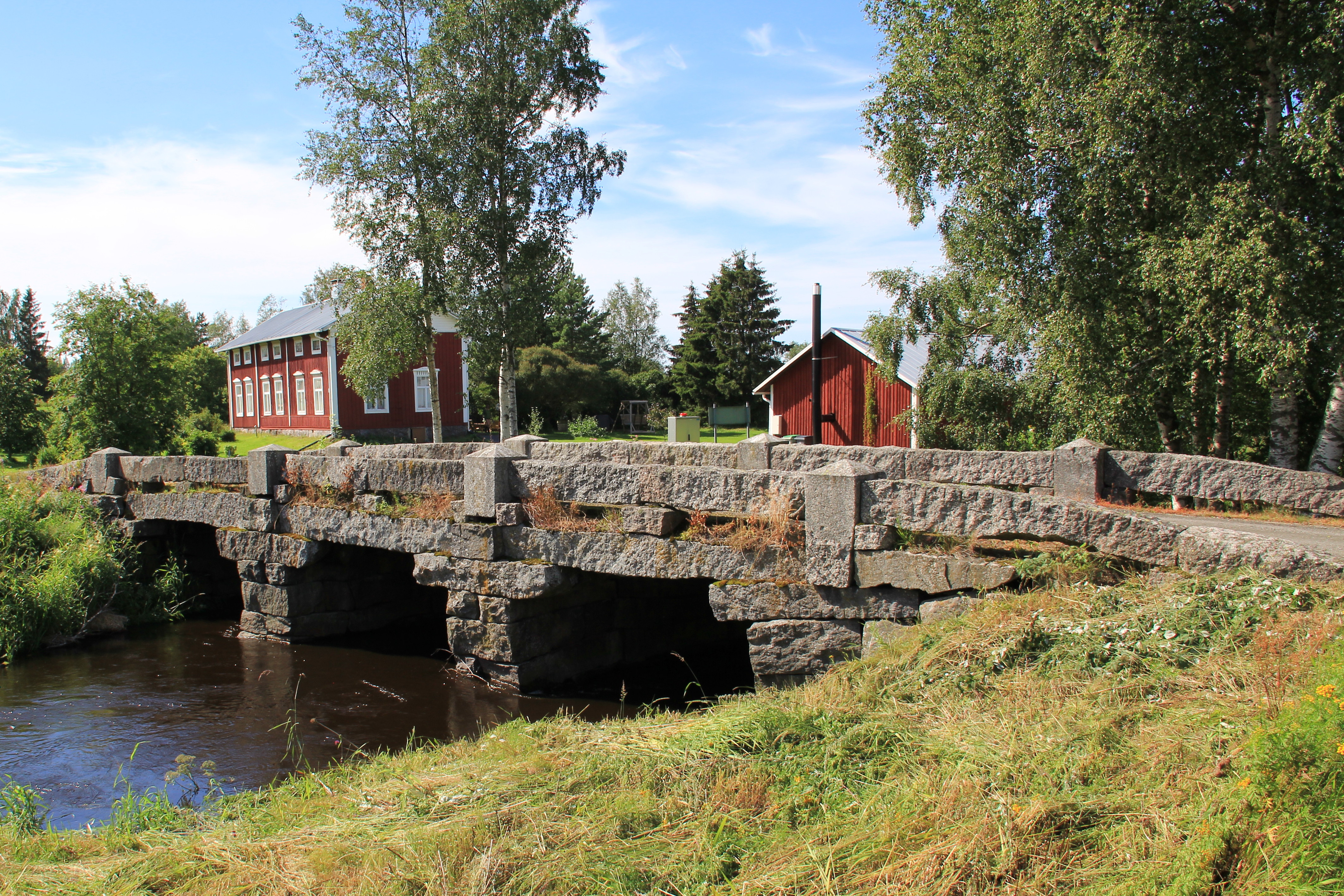

- Coat of arms

- Location of Korsnäs in Finland
- Interactive map of Korsnäs
- Coordinates: 62°47′N 021°11′E
- Country: Finland
- Region: Ostrobothnia
- Sub-region: Vaasa
- Charter: 1887

Government
  - Municipal manager: Christina Båssar

Area (2018-01-01)
  - Total: 1,424.71 km^{2} (550.08 sq mi)
  - Land: 236.27 km^{2} (91.22 sq mi)
  - Water: 1,189.06 km^{2} (459.10 sq mi)
  - Rank: 252nd largest in Finland

Population (2025-12-31)
  - Total: 1,984
  - Rank: 257th largest in Finland
  - Density: 8.4/km^{2} (22/sq mi)

Population by native language
  - Swedish: 83% (official)
  - Finnish: 3.7% (official)
  - Others: 13.4%

Population by age
  - 0 to 14: 14.5%
  - 15 to 64: 56.3%
  - 65 or older: 29.2%
- Time zone: UTC+02:00 (EET)
  - Summer (DST): UTC+03:00 (EEST)
- Website: www.korsnas.fi

Korsnäs is a municipality in Finland, located on the west coast of the country. Korsnäs is situated in Ostrobothnia, along the Gulf of Bothnia. The population of Korsnäs is approximately 2,000, while the sub-region has a population of approximately 112,000. It is the 257th most populous municipality in Finland.

Korsnäs is a bilingual municipality with Finnish and Swedish as its official languages. The population consists of 4% Finnish speakers, 83% Swedish speakers, and 13% speakers of other languages.

== Geography ==
Korsnäs is the most western mainland municipality in Finland. It covers an area of 1,424.71 square kilometres (550.08 sq mi) of which 1,189.06 km^{2} (459.10 sq mi) is water.

It has a long, rocky coastline along the Gulf of Bothnia. The three largest islands are Halsön, Bredskäret and Södra Björkön, all used as important recreation areas for urban dwellers.

=== Climate ===
Korsnäs has a subarctic climate (Dfc) with oceanic influences.

Climate data for Korsnäs Bredskäret (1991–2020 normals, extremes 1993– present)
Month	Jan	Feb	Mar	Apr	May	Jun	Jul	Aug	Sep	Oct	Nov	Dec	Year
Record high °C (°F)	7.1 (44.8)	6.2 (43.2)	12.0 (53.6)	18.3 (64.9)	25.6 (78.1)	29.4 (84.9)	29.1 (84.4)	29.1 (84.4)	25.0 (77.0)	16.2 (61.2)	11.7 (53.1)	7.4 (45.3)	29.4 (84.9)
Daily mean °C (°F)	−3.9 (25.0)	−5.0 (23.0)	−2.5 (27.5)	1.9 (35.4)	7.8 (46.0)	13.0 (55.4)	16.4 (61.5)	15.9 (60.6)	11.6 (52.9)	6.1 (43.0)	1.7 (35.1)	−1.5 (29.3)	5.1 (41.2)
Record low °C (°F)	−38.1 (−36.6)	−27.8 (−18.0)	−24.7 (−12.5)	−16.7 (1.9)	−1.8 (28.8)	3.8 (38.8)	7.8 (46.0)	7.4 (45.3)	0.8 (33.4)	−6.2 (20.8)	−19.3 (−2.7)	−28.7 (−19.7)	−38.1 (−36.6)
Source 1: FMI normals 1991-2020
Source 2: Record highs and lows

== History ==
Due to the post-glacial rebound, most of the area that today forms the municipality of Korsnäs stood under water until around 1000 A.D. The first settlement in Korsnäs is assumed to stem from the 13th century. Some place names of Finnish origin (such as Molpe (Moikipää) and Taklax (Takalaksi)) indicate a Finnish-speaking presence in the 13th century, although it is disputed if these people (probably from Häme) only used the area for fishing on a seasonly basis or if they established a proper, but sparse, settlement. Swedish-speaking settlers came to the area in the 13th or 14th century.

== Population ==
The municipality has a population of 1,984 (31 December 2025), which make it the smallest municipality in Ostrobothnia in terms of population. The population density is 8.4 inhabitants per square kilometre (22/sq mi).

Korsnäs is a bilingual municipality with Finnish and Swedish as its official languages. The population consists of 4% Finnish speakers, 83% Swedish speakers, and 13% speakers of other languages. Prior to 2014, Swedish was the only official language.

== Politics ==
In the 2017 Municipal elections Swedish People's Party got 95 percent of the vote, which obtained it each of the 21 seats of the municipality council.

== Name ==
Korsnäs is the municipality's official name in both Swedish and Finnish. The Finnish names Korsnääsi or Ristitaipale are known to have been used historically in some contexts.

Korsnäs was first mentioned in historical documents is 1442, and some individual villages, like Molpe (then called Moikipä) was first mentioned in 1490, and Harrström (then called Harffuaström) in 1494. Korsnäs became an independent municipality in 1887. Prior to that, the area belonged to Närpes.

== Famous people hailing from Korsnäs ==
- Geri Halliwell, whose grandfather was born and raised there
