= Edvin Larsson =

Swedish theologian

Gustav Edvin Larsson (24 January 1925 – 4 April 2009) was a Swedish theologian.

After publishing Christus als Vorbild in 1962, he earned his Doctor of Theology degree. He was a docent at Uppsala University from 1962 and then a professor at the MF Norwegian School of Theology from 1966 to 1992. He was a member of the Norwegian Academy of Science and Letters from 1986. Larsson was born in Burträsk and died in April 2009 in Uppsala.
