= Viktor Arvidsson =

Swedish ice hockey player (born 1993)

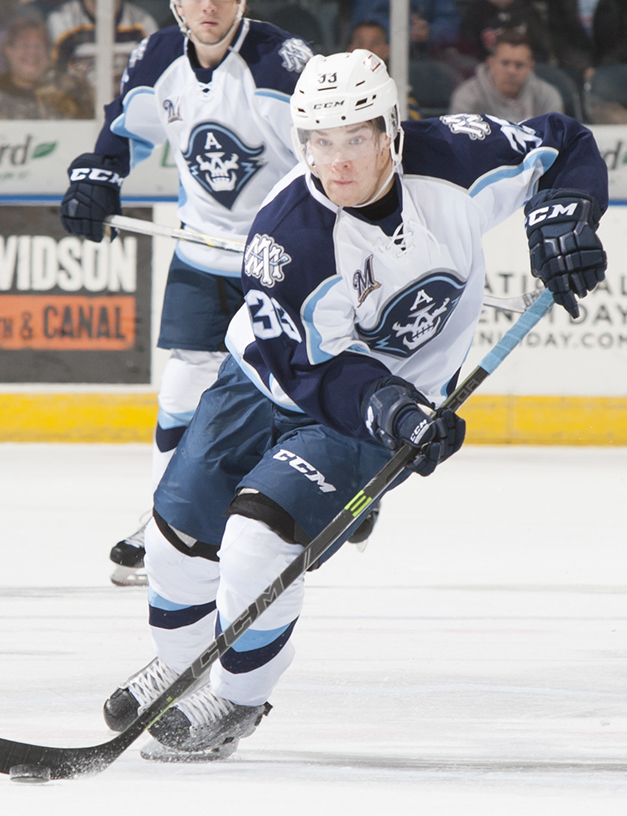
- Arvidsson with the Milwaukee Admirals in 2015
- Born: 8 April 1993 (age 33) Kusmark, Sweden
- Height: 5 ft 10 in (178 cm)
- Weight: 185 lb (84 kg; 13 st 3 lb)
- Position: Right wing
- Shoots: Right
- NHL team Former teams: Detroit Red Wings; Skellefteå AIK; Nashville Predators; Los Angeles Kings; Edmonton Oilers; Boston Bruins
- National team: Sweden
- NHL draft: 112th overall, 2014; Nashville Predators
- Playing career: 2011–present

Johan Viktor Arvidsson (born 8 April 1993) is a Swedish professional ice hockey player who is a right winger for the Detroit Red Wings of the National Hockey League (NHL). He was selected by the Nashville Predators in the fourth round, 112th overall, at the 2014 NHL entry draft.

== Playing career ==
Arvidsson previously played in his native Sweden, winning the Swedish Championship twice with Skellefteå AIK in the Swedish Hockey League (SHL). On 15 July 2014, Arvidsson signed a three-year, entry-level contract with the Predators.

On 20 March 2015, the Predators recalled Arvidsson from the Milwaukee Admirals of the American Hockey League (AHL) under emergency conditions, after Colin Wilson suffered a lower-body injury in practice on 19 March 2015. Arvidsson made his NHL debut on 21 March 2015, playing 12 minutes and 52 seconds and recording three shots on goal, one hit and one takeaway in a 3–0 win over the Buffalo Sabres.

On 8 October 2015, Arvidsson scored his first NHL goal, against Cam Ward of the Carolina Hurricanes, a goal that eventually proved to be the game-winner. Arvidsson scored his first career Stanley Cup playoff goal on 9 May 2016 in overtime of Game 6 of the Western Conference Semi-finals against the San Jose Sharks to force the series to a deciding Game 7, which the Predators ultimately lost.

During his breakout 2016–17 season, Arvidsson scored his first career hat-trick, including a short-handed marker, in a 7–4 loss to the Florida Panthers on 11 February 2017. He finished the season with 31 goals and 30 assists for a total of 61 points, which tied him with Ryan Johansen as the Predators' leading scorers.

On 22 July 2017, the Predators re-signed Arvidsson to a seven-year, $29.75 million contract with an annual average of $4.25 million, avoiding arbitration. He also switched his jersey number from #38 to #33. On 16 January 2018, Arvidsson was placed on injured reserve to recover from a lower-body injury, but was activated from it after only missing two games. He ended the regular season tying his career high in points with 61 to help the Predators qualify for the 2018 Stanley Cup playoffs.

Although Arvidsson was named to the Predators opening night roster prior to the beginning of the 2018–19 NHL season, he only played in 58 of 82 regular season games due to injuries. On 12 November 2018, Arvidsson was placed on injured reserve to recover from a broken thumb suffered during a game against the Dallas Stars. He returned to the Predators lineup on 21 December after missing 12 games. He later recorded his second career hat trick in a 7–2 win over the Washington Capitals on 15 January 2019. On 6 April 2019, Arvidsson set the single-season scoring record for the Nashville Predators when he scored his 34th goal of the season against the Chicago Blackhawks in a 5–2 victory in Nashville.

During the 2019–20 season, Arvidsson was injured during a game against the St. Louis Blues due to Robert Bortuzzo repeatedly cross-checking him. He was expected to miss four to six weeks in order to recover from the lower-body injury. When the Predators met the Blues again on 15 February, Bortuzzo fought twice during the game, with Arvidsson and Jarred Tinordi, as the team won 4–3.

In the 2020–21 season, on 8 April 2021, on his 28th birthday, Arvidsson scored his third career hat trick during a 7–1 win against the Detroit Red Wings, with his third goal of the game coming on a penalty shot.

Following his seventh season with the Predators, on 1 July 2021, Arvidsson was traded to the Los Angeles Kings in exchange for a 2021 second-round pick and a 2022 third-round pick. In his first season with the Kings, Arvidsson became the fastest player in his first season with the team to score 20 points since Mike Richards did so in 2011.

On 1 July 2024, Arvidsson signed as a free agent to a two-year, $8 million contract with the Edmonton Oilers. In the 2024–25 season, Arvidsson failed to replicate his past offensive outputs, notching 15 goals and 12 assists for 27 points in 67 regular-season games for the Oilers. He helped the Oilers reach the Stanley Cup Final, with 7 points through 15 playoff games.

Following just one season with the Oilers, Arvidsson was traded by the Oilers to Boston Bruins in exchange for fifth-round pick in 2027 on 1 July 2025.

On 1 July 2026, Arvidsson signed a two-year, $10 million contract with the Detroit Red Wings.

== Career statistics ==
=== Regular season and playoffs ===
			Regular season					Playoffs
Season	Team	League	GP	G	A	Pts	PIM	GP	G	A	Pts	PIM
2009–10	Skellefteå AIK	J18	22	32	30	62	34	—	—	—	—	—
2009–10	Skellefteå AIK	J18 Allsv	18	20	18	38	26	3	1	1	2	0
2009–10	Skellefteå AIK	J20	2	0	1	1	2	2	1	0	1	0
2010–11	Skellefteå AIK	J18	1	1	1	2	12	—	—	—	—	—
2010–11	Skellefteå AIK	J18 Allsv	3	6	6	12	6	7	4	6	10	4
2010–11	Skellefteå AIK	J20	40	15	19	34	51	5	3	3	6	4
2010–11	Skellefteå AIK	SEL	3	0	0	0	0	—	—	—	—	—
2011–12	Skellefteå AIK	J20	43	25	17	42	18	3	0	0	0	0
2011–12	Skellefteå AIK	SEL	4	0	0	0	0	—	—	—	—	—
2012–13	Skellefteå AIK	J20	4	3	1	4	0	—	—	—	—	—
2012–13	Skellefteå AIK	SEL	49	7	5	12	12	13	6	2	8	2
2013–14	Skellefteå AIK	SHL	50	16	24	40	59	14	4	12	16	4
2014–15	Milwaukee Admirals	AHL	70	22	33	55	43	—	—	—	—	—
2014–15	Nashville Predators	NHL	6	0	0	0	0	—	—	—	—	—
2015–16	Nashville Predators	NHL	56	8	8	16	35	14	1	1	2	8
2015–16	Milwaukee Admirals	AHL	17	8	10	18	6	—	—	—	—	—
2016–17	Nashville Predators	NHL	80	31	30	61	28	22	3	10	13	19
2017–18	Nashville Predators	NHL	78	29	32	61	36	13	5	4	9	6
2018–19	Nashville Predators	NHL	58	34	14	48	26	6	0	0	0	2
2019–20	Nashville Predators	NHL	57	15	13	28	26	4	3	0	3	2
2020–21	Nashville Predators	NHL	50	10	15	25	21	2	0	0	0	2
2021–22	Los Angeles Kings	NHL	66	20	29	49	22	—	—	—	—	—
2022–23	Los Angeles Kings	NHL	77	26	33	59	24	6	1	6	7	2
2023–24	Los Angeles Kings	NHL	18	6	9	15	14	5	0	3	3	0
2024–25	Edmonton Oilers	NHL	67	15	12	27	24	15	2	5	7	6
2025–26	Boston Bruins	NHL	69	25	29	54	24	4	2	0	2	0
SHL totals			106	23	29	52	71	27	10	14	24	6
NHL totals			682	219	224	443	280	91	17	29	46	47

Medal record

Ice hockey

Representing Sweden

World Championships
Gold medal – first place	2018 Denmark	

World Junior Championships
Silver medal – second place	2013 Ufa	

World U18 Championships
Silver medal – second place	2011 Germany	

=== International ===
Year	Team	Event	Result	GP	G	A	Pts	PIM
2010	Sweden	U17	3rd place, bronze medalist(s)	6	2	2	4	2
2010	Sweden	IH18	3rd place, bronze medalist(s)	5	5	1	6	2
2011	Sweden	WJC18	2nd place, silver medalist(s)	5	0	1	1	8
2013	Sweden	WJC	2nd place, silver medalist(s)	6	4	1	5	6
2018	Sweden	WC	1st place, gold medalist(s)	5	3	0	3	6
2025	Sweden	4NF	3rd	3	0	1	1	0
Junior totals				22	11	5	16	18
Senior totals				8	3	1	4	6
