= Lövånger =

Lövånger Levanger
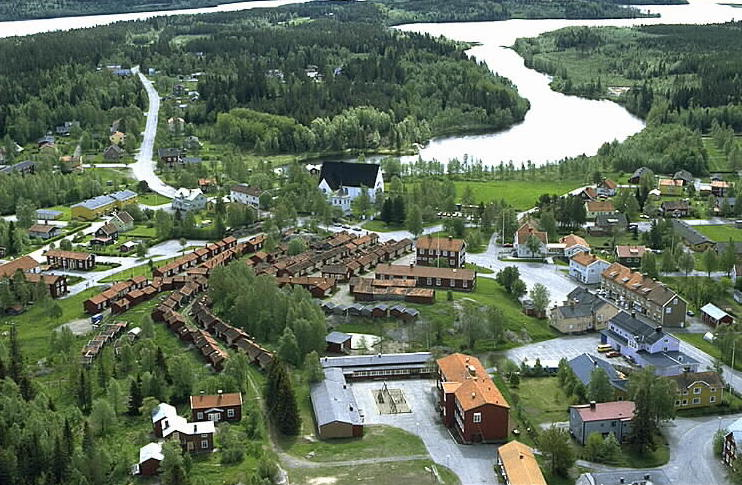

- Location within Västerbotten Location within Sweden
- Coordinates: 64°22′N 21°18′E
- Country: Sweden
- Province: Västerbotten
- County: Västerbotten County
- Municipality: Skellefteå Municipality

Area
  - Total: 1.32 km^{2} (0.51 sq mi)

Population (31 December 2010)
  - Total: 761
  - Density: 578/km^{2} (1,500/sq mi)
- Time zone: UTC+1 (CET)
  - Summer (DST): UTC+2 (CEST)

Lövånger (Lövånger dialect Levanger, Ume Sami Liävåŋkkere) is a locality situated in Skellefteå Municipality, Västerbotten County, Sweden with 761 inhabitants in 2010.
