= Skelleftehamn =

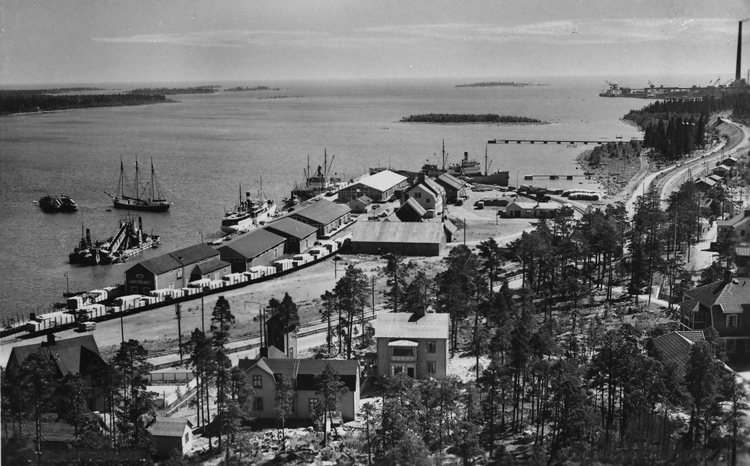
- Skelleftehamn in 1935

- Location within Västerbotten Location within Sweden
- Coordinates: 64°41′N 21°14′E
- Country: Sweden
- Province: Västerbotten
- County: Västerbotten County
- Municipality: Skellefteå Municipality

Area
  - Total: 4.01 km^{2} (1.55 sq mi)

Population (31 December 2010)
  - Total: 3,184
  - Density: 794/km^{2} (2,060/sq mi)
- Time zone: UTC+1 (CET)
  - Summer (DST): UTC+2 (CEST)

Skelleftehamn (Swedish pronunciation: [ɧɛlɛftɛˈhamn]) is a locality situated in Skellefteå Municipality, Västerbotten County, Sweden with 3,184 inhabitants in 2010.

== Notable people ==
- Stieg Larsson, journalist, writer and author of crime fiction/thriller Millennium trilogy.
- Victoria Silvstedt, model, actress, singer and television personality.
