= Ersmark, Skellefteå =

Ersmark
- Location within Västerbotten Location within Sweden
- Coordinates: 64°51′N 20°54′E
- Country: Sweden
- Province: Västerbotten
- County: Västerbotten County
- Municipality: Skellefteå Municipality

Area
  - Total: 1.48 km^{2} (0.57 sq mi)

Population (31 December 2010)
  - Total: 892
  - Density: 603/km^{2} (1,560/sq mi)
- Time zone: UTC+1 (CET)
  - Summer (DST): UTC+2 (CEST)

Ersmark is a locality situated in Skellefteå Municipality, Västerbotten County, Sweden with 892 inhabitants in 2010.
