= Fällfors =

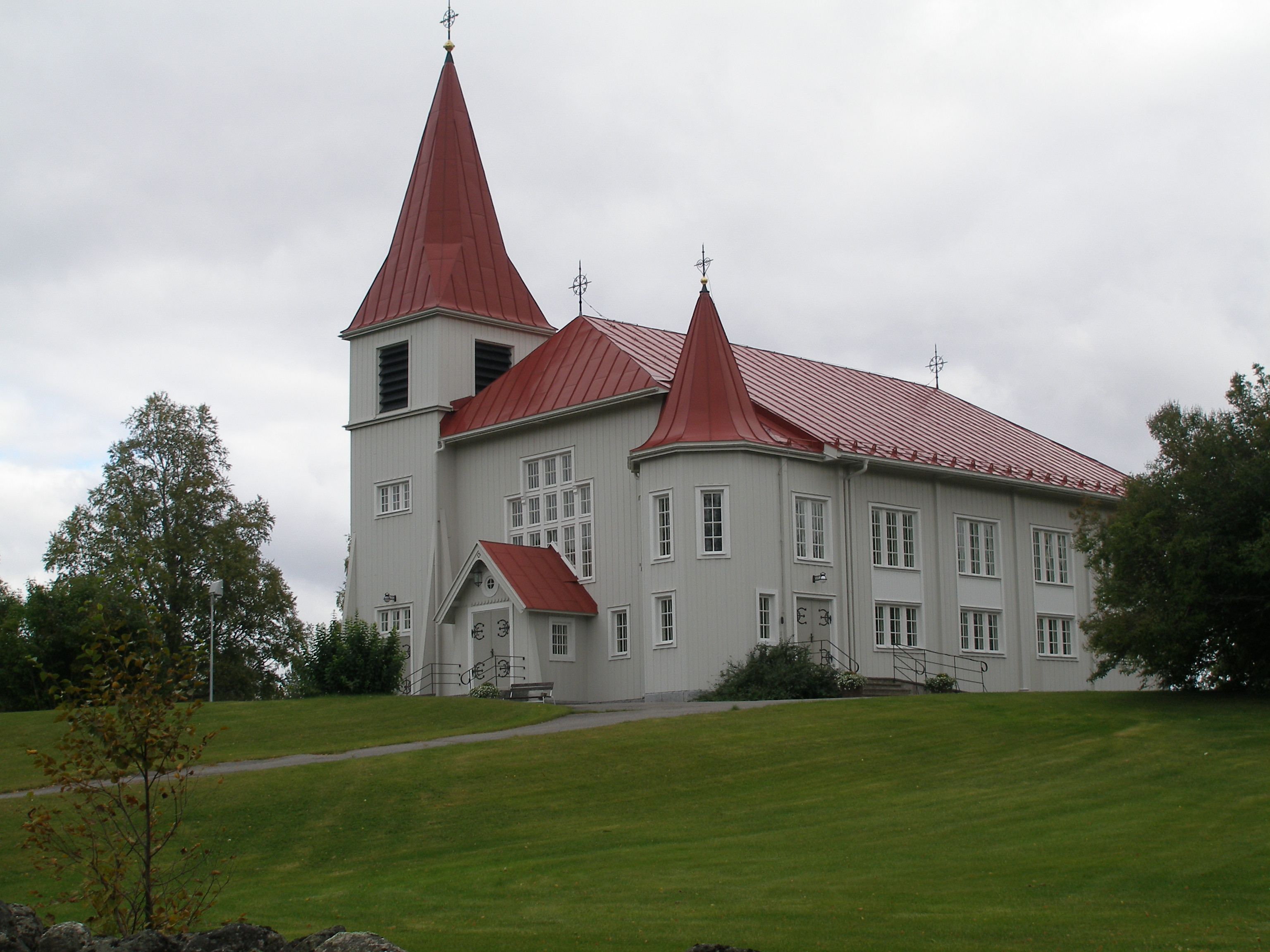
- Fällfors church (2008)

- Location within Västerbotten Location within Sweden
- Coordinates: 65°07′27″N 20°47′15″E
- Country: Sweden
- Province: Västerbotten
- County: Västerbotten County
- Municipality: Skellefteå Municipality

Area
  - Total: 0.33 km^{2} (0.13 sq mi)

Population (31 December 2005)
  - Total: 158
  - Density: 482/km^{2} (1,250/sq mi)
- Time zone: UTC+1 (CET)
  - Summer (DST): UTC+2 (CEST)

Fällfors is a town located in Västerbotten, Sweden. The nearby town to Fällfors is Jörn.
