= Drängsmark =

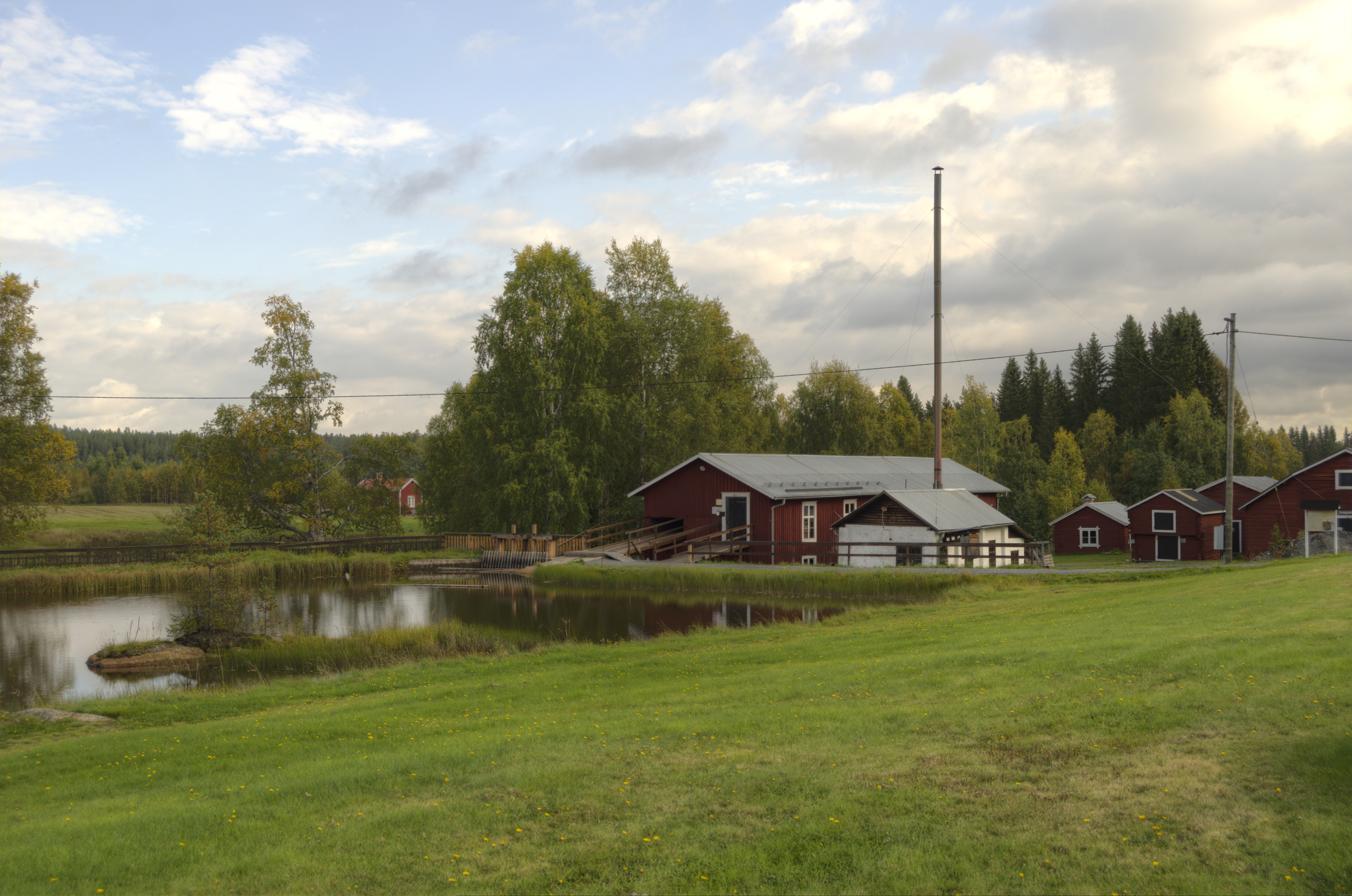

- Location within Västerbotten Location within Sweden
- Coordinates: 64°55′N 20°58′E
- Country: Sweden
- Province: Västerbotten
- County: Västerbotten County
- Municipality: Skellefteå Municipality

Area
  - Total: 0.54 km^{2} (0.21 sq mi)

Population (31 December 2010)
  - Total: 333
  - Density: 617/km^{2} (1,600/sq mi)
- Time zone: UTC+1 (CET)
  - Summer (DST): UTC+2 (CEST)

Drängsmark is a locality situated in Skellefteå Municipality, Västerbotten County, Sweden with 333 inhabitants in 2010.
