= Bjällerup Church =

- Bjällerups kyrka
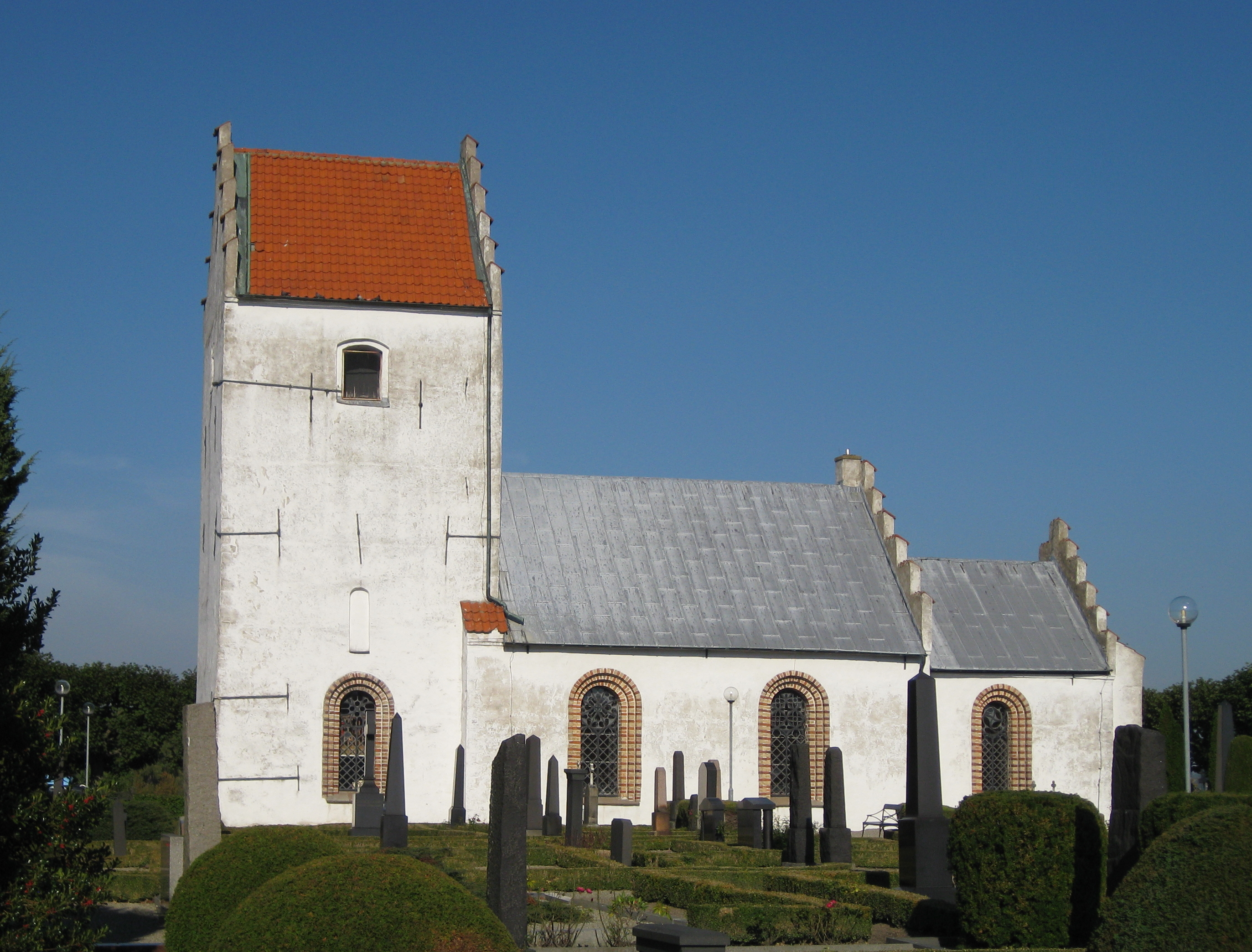
- Bjällerup Church

- Location within Skåne Location within Sweden Location within Europe
- 55°39′40″N 13°15′37″E
- Country: Sweden
- Denomination: Church of Sweden

Bjällerup Church (Swedish: Bjällerups kyrka) is a medieval church in Stora Bjällerup, a village in Staffanstorp Municipality, Scania, Sweden. It belongs to the Church of Sweden. It is one of the oldest churches in the province, and contains medieval furnishings and murals from the 14th century.

== History ==
The church was built during the late 11th or 12th century, in a Romanesque style with influences from nearby Dalby Church. It is one of the oldest churches in Scania. The tower was built later, probably during the 13th century and may have been built to be able to serve as a fortification in times of unrest. In the 14th century, the interior was altered and the present vaults constructed and decorated with murals. The main entrance door of the church is also from the 14th century and preserved in situ. In 1759 the windows were enlarged, and the church was renovated between 1850 and 1853 to designs by Carl Georg Brunius. Works to restore the murals of the church was carried out in 1959 and again 1976–77.

== Murals and furnishings ==
The oldest item in the church is the baptismal font, dated to the 12th century. The rood is from the late 15th century and probably made in the Low Countries. From the same century is a wooden Madonna. The biggest of the church bells is from 1567. The pulpit is from the 1890s, decorated by artist Fredrik Krebs. The altarpiece is from the 1920s.

The vaults of the nave and chancel are decorated with murals from the 14th century. The ones in the chancel depict the Annunciation and the birth of Christ, with Mary and Elizabeth. The murals in the nave depict several saints with their attributes.
