= Burträsk Fault =

Geological fault in Sweden

Coordinates: 64.428764°N 20.527395°E

Burträsk Fault (Swedish: Burträskförkastningen) is a large geological fault located in Northern Sweden. The fault had a major period of seismic activity following the deglaciation of Fennoscandia about 10,000 years ago. On surface the fault can be observed in the form of a fault scarp, but the fault is longer than the scarp implies. Likely extends northeast below sea level into the Bothnian Bay. The Burträsk fault is one of several postglacial faults in northern Sweden that remain seismically active. Currently, it is the most seismically active area in the whole of Sweden.
