= Bygdsiljum =

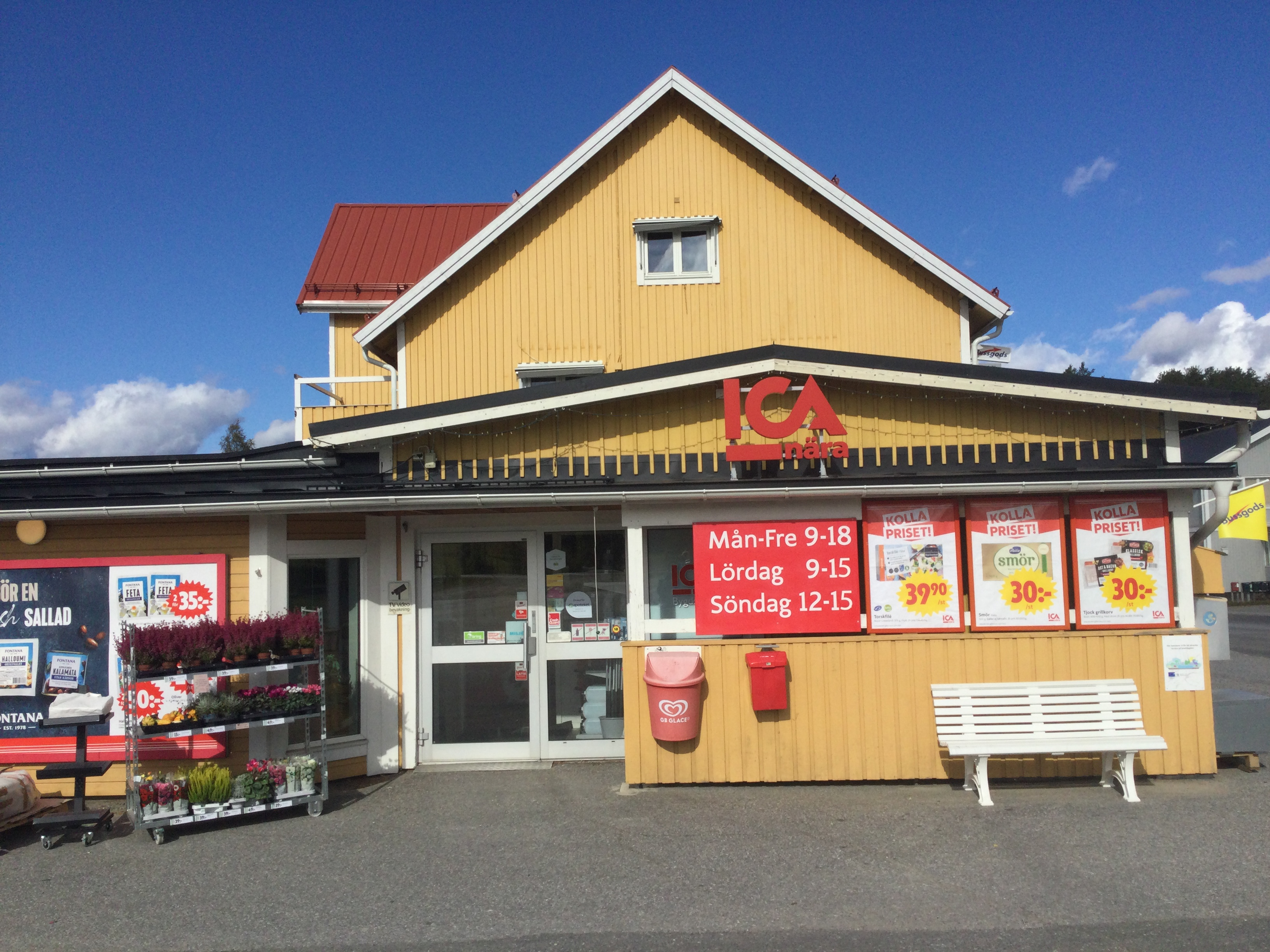

- Location within Västerbotten Location within Sweden
- Coordinates: 64°22′N 20°29′E
- Country: Sweden
- Province: Västerbotten
- County: Västerbotten County
- Municipality: Skellefteå Municipality

Area
  - Total: 1.04 km^{2} (0.40 sq mi)

Population (31 December 2010)
  - Total: 333
  - Density: 345/km^{2} (890/sq mi)
- Time zone: UTC+1 (CET)
  - Summer (DST): UTC+2 (CEST)

Bygdsiljum is a locality situated in Skellefteå Municipality, Västerbotten County, Sweden with 333 inhabitants in 2015.

It is situated at the outlet of Västerbotten's biggest lake, Bygdeträsket, 20 km from the coast and 1 hour by car from the cities of Skellefteå and Umeå.

The town's economy is mostly built on farming, light industry and lumber.
