= Stora Råby Church =

Church in Lund, Sweden

Coordinates: 55°41′09″N 13°13′30″E

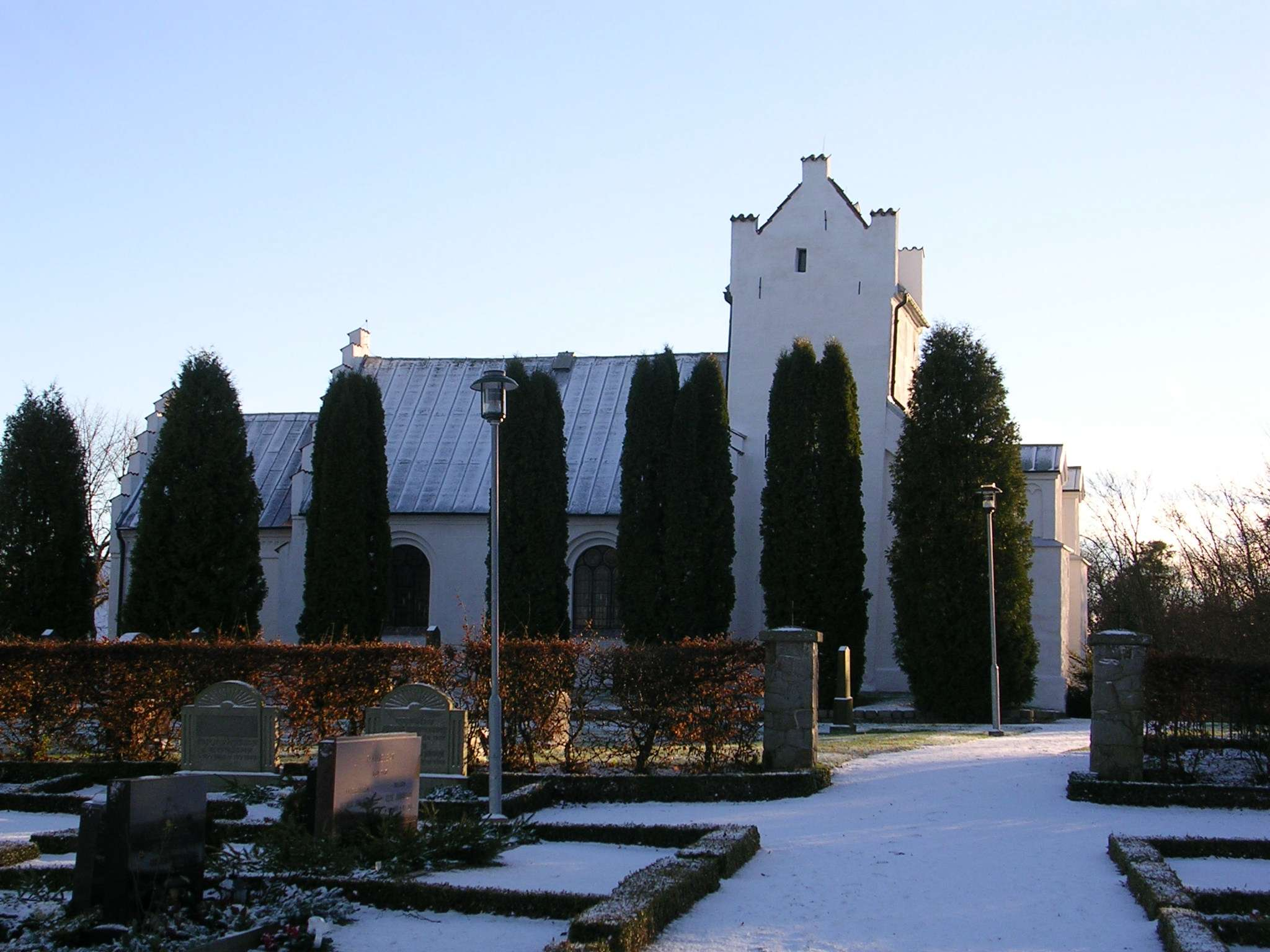
Stora Råby Church

Stora Råby Church (Swedish: Stora Råby kyrka) is a medieval Lutheran church in the outskirts of Lund in the province of Scania, Sweden. It belongs to the Diocese of Lund.

== History and architecture ==
Stora Råby Church was probably built during the 13th century, in an early Gothic style. At the end of the Middle Ages, the interior was remade and the present vaulted ceiling built. The medieval tower was enlarged during the 18th century, and to the western end of this was added two buttresses during the mid-19th century to designs by Carl Georg Brunius. During the 20th century, a church porch was added between these and the former church porch was turned into a sacristy. In 1934 a new window in the apse was added to the church, designed by Hugo Gehlin, an artist from Helsingborg. Among the church fittings, the baptismal font is the oldest, dating from the 13th century.

== Gallery ==
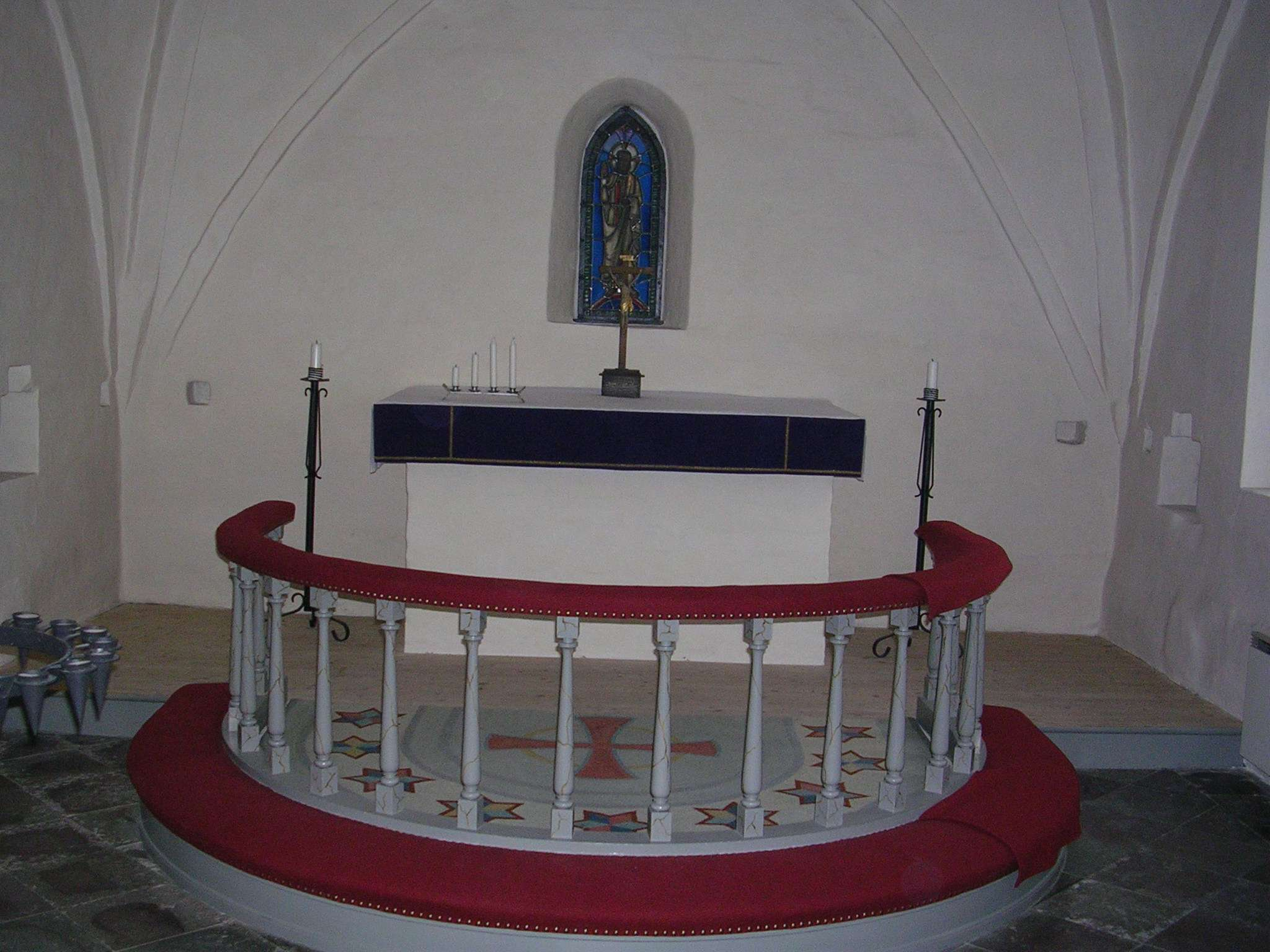
Altar

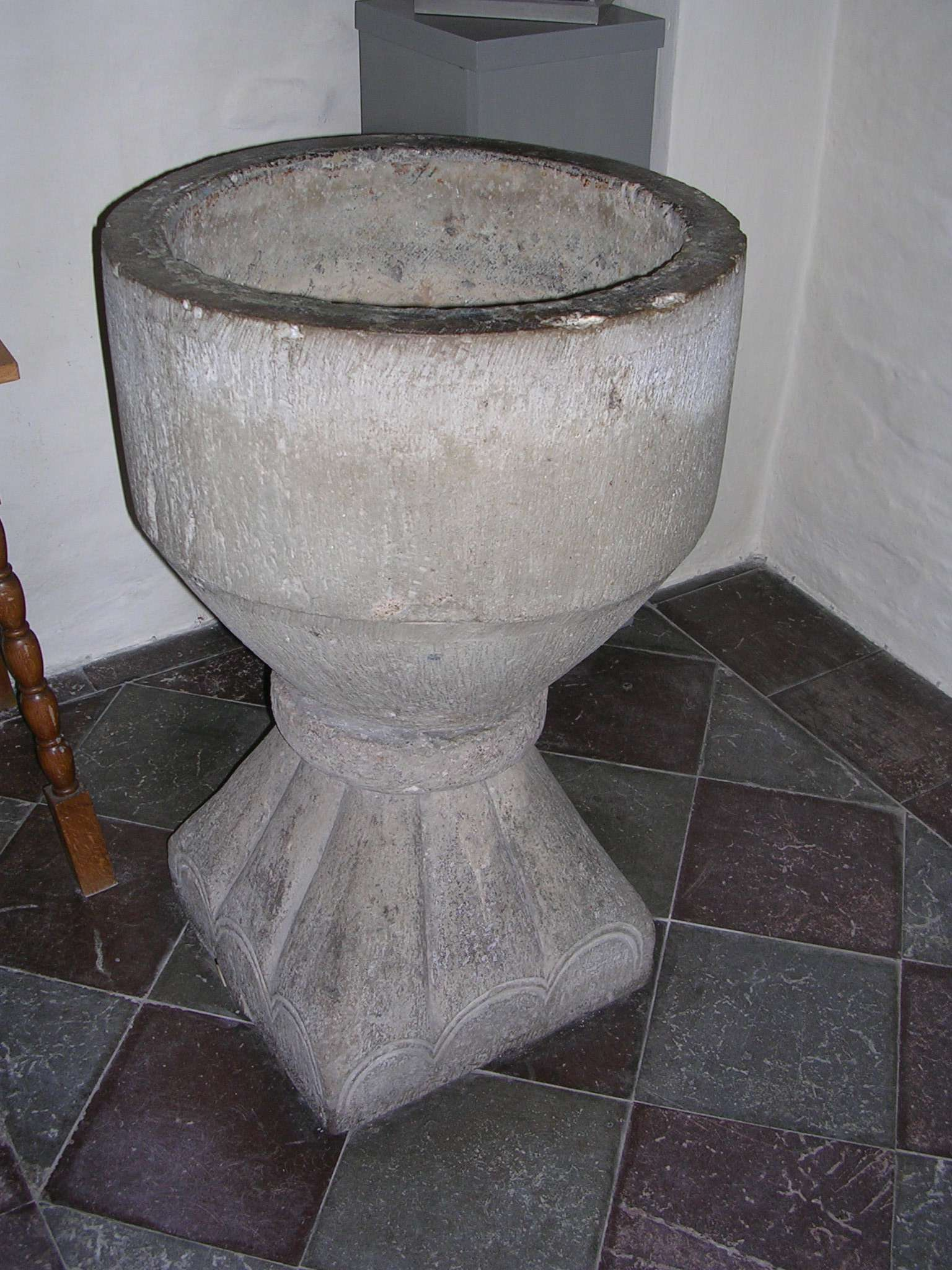
Baptismal

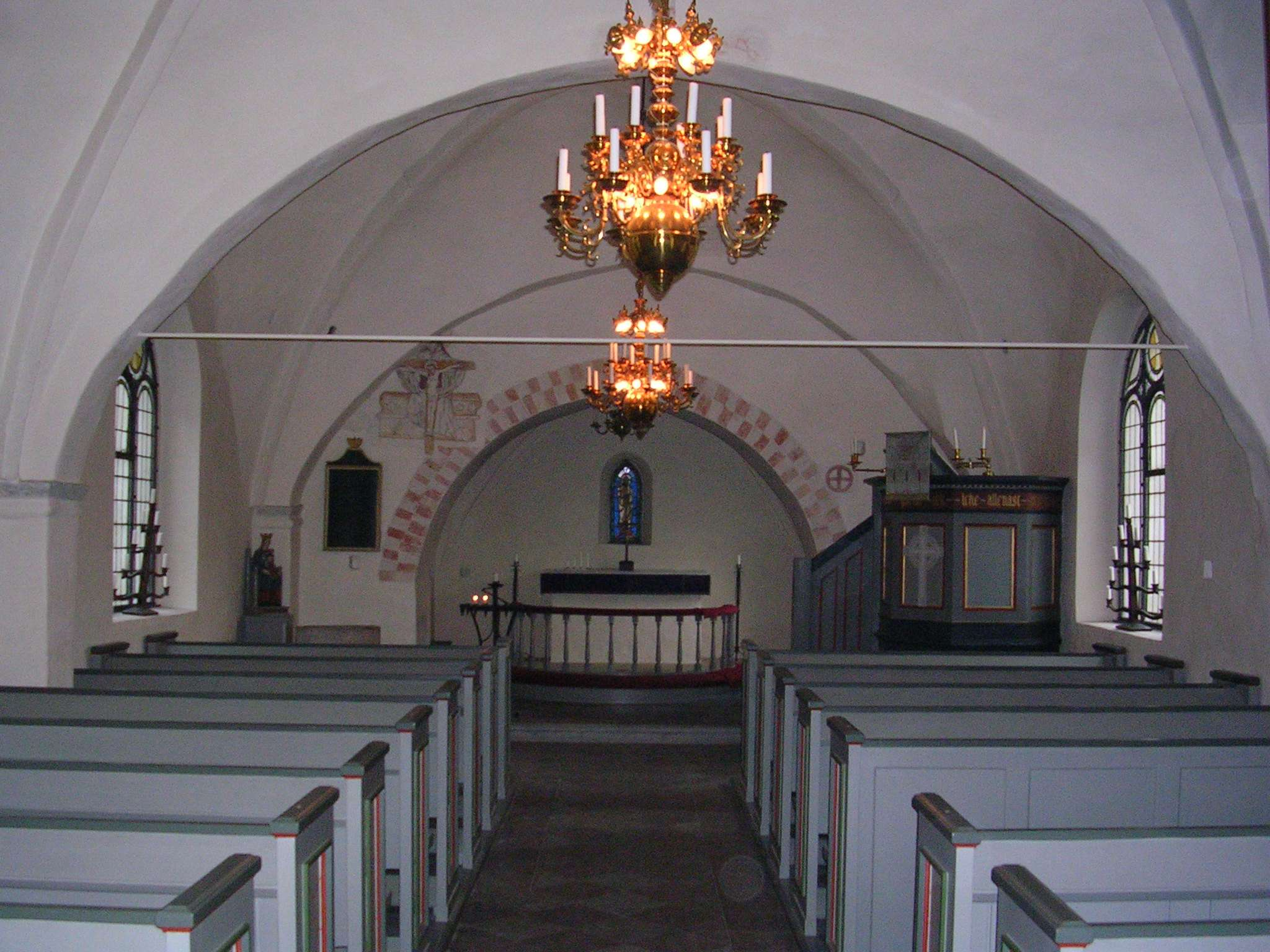
Interior

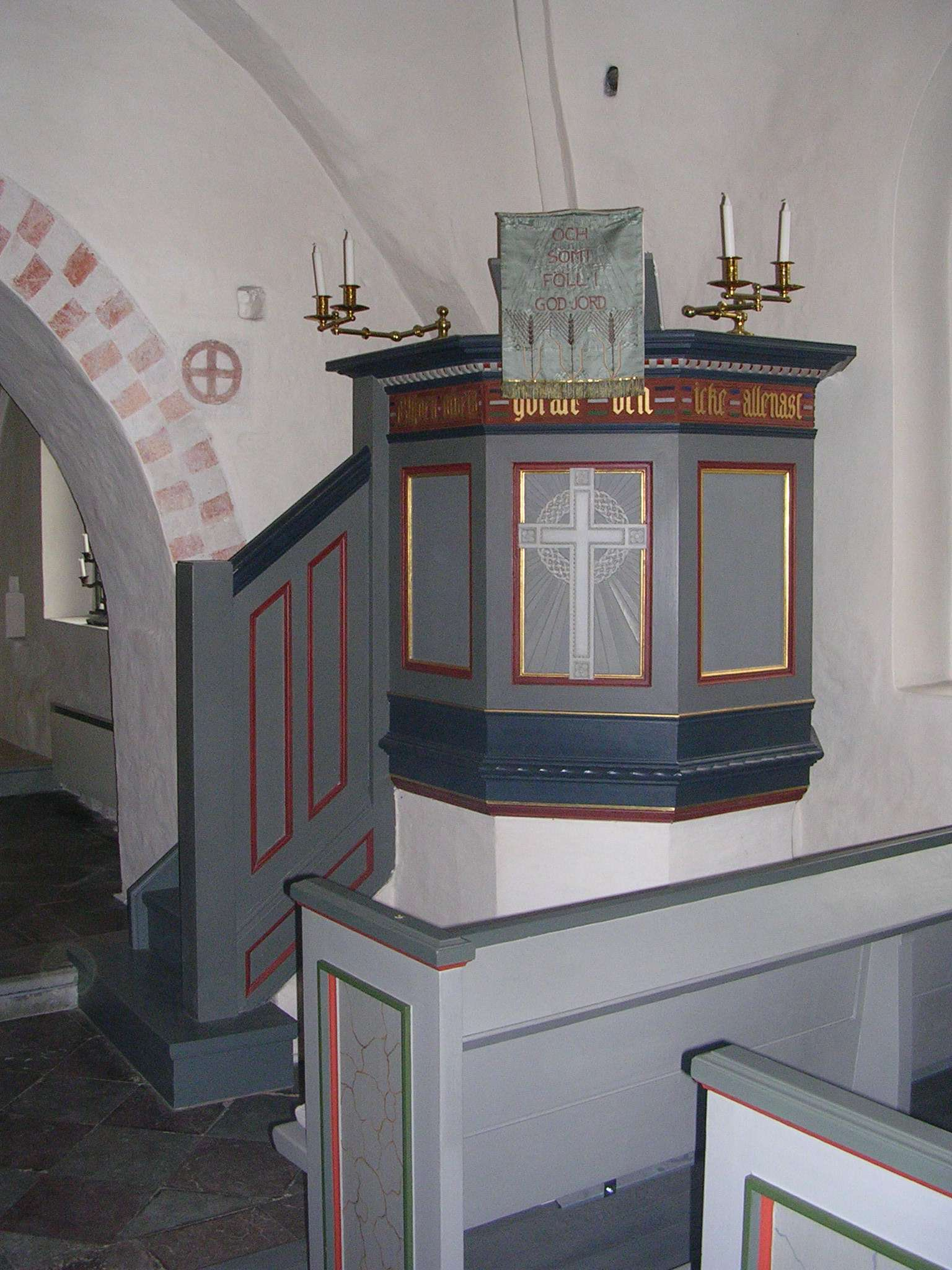
Pulpit

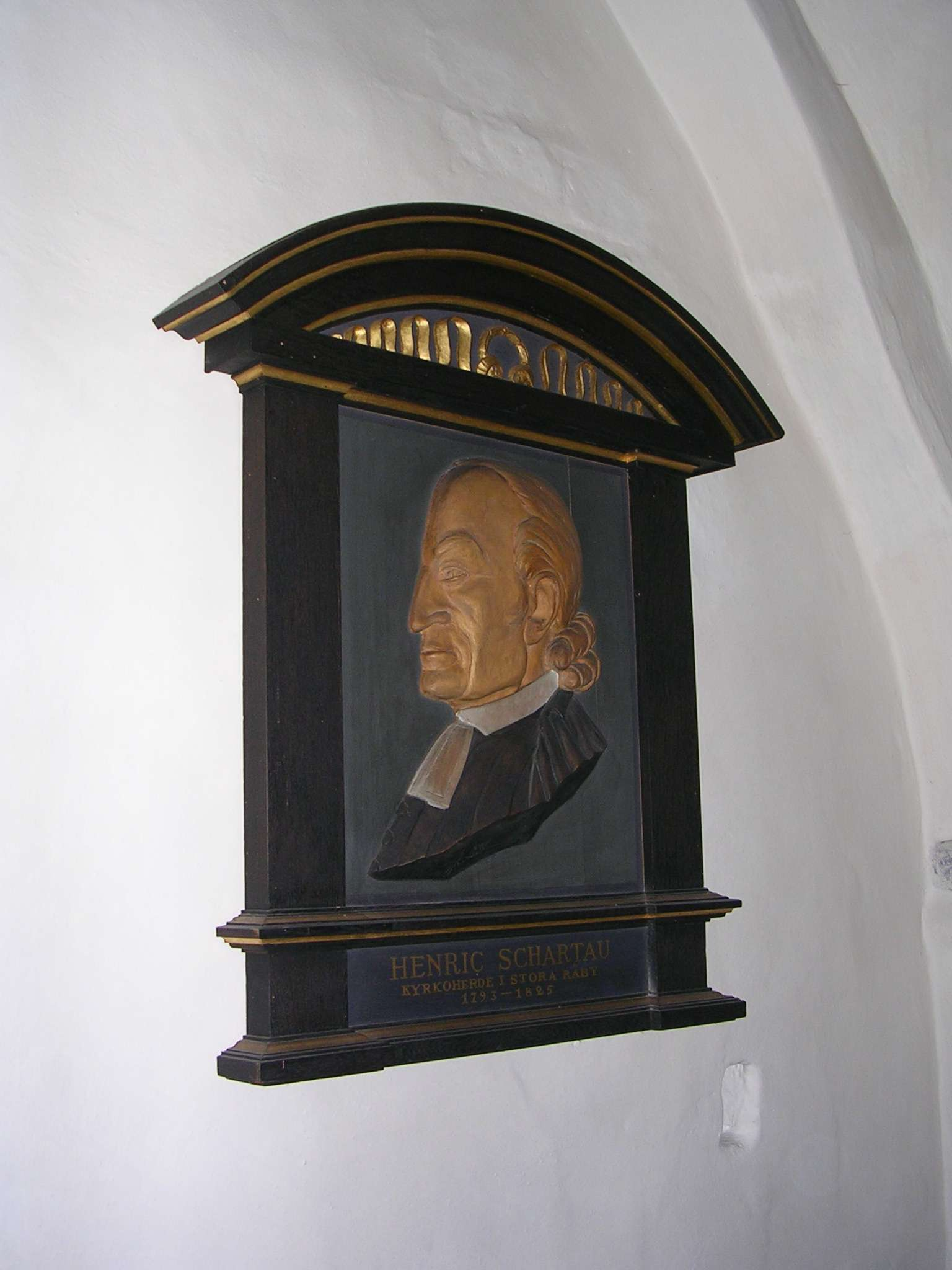
Portrait of Henric Schartau.
