= Halsön (Korsnäs) =

- Location within Finland

Geography
- Coordinates: 62.848566°N 21.165107°E
- Adjacent to: Sea of Bothnia
- Area: 1,800 ha (4,400 acres)
- Length: 7.5 km (4.66 mi)
- Width: 4.5 km (2.8 mi)

Administration
- Finland
- Region: Ostrobothnia
- Municipality: Korsnäs

Halsön, or Halsö, is an island in the Bothnian Sea, in the Kvarken Archipelago of Finland. It is in the Korsnäs municipality. The island is marshy and wooded. It is used in part for forestry, and has some vacation cabins. The west of the island is a protected nature reserve, with an unusual environment of flads and gloe lakes that provide refuges for fish and birds.

== Location ==
Korsnäs is the most western mainland municipality in Finland. It has a long, rocky coastline along the Gulf of Bothnia. The three largest islands are Halsön, Bredskäret and Södra Björkön, all used as important recreation areas for urban dwellers. Halsön lies near the mainland to the south of Molpehällorna.

The archipelago, including Halson Island and the surrounding shallow sea, is characterized by an undulating moraine terrain with till surfaces rich in boulders. This is an effect of glaciation, where the granitic rocks were cracked by the ice and then transported by glaciers. Some very large boulders could have been carried to new locations by flowing glaciers or by floating icebergs.

WPD Finland Oy has stated plans to build a wind farm in public waters of the Korsnäs municipality. The wind farm would be about 6 kilometres (3.7 mi) from a conservation area on Halsön.

== Island ==
Halsön island is 5 kilometres (3.1 mi) north of the municipal center of Korsnäs. It is 7.5 kilometres (4.7 mi) from east to west, and 4.5 kilometres (2.8 mi) from north to south. The area is about 1,800 hectares (4,400 acres). Halsön is low-lying, with only a small part of the western end more than 10 metres (33 ft) above sea level. About half of the island is over 5 metres (16 ft) above sea level. The interior of the island is mostly wet or marshland. The western part of the island is a nature reserve. About 300 hectares (740 acres) in the east is used for forestry.

In the past the island was used for animal grazing. There are still some old barns, but they are badly decayed. There was a fishing village on the island up to the early 1900s, and there are the remains of several fish huts, docks, boat houses and storage pits. There are now a number of cottages on private land along the beach. Until recently the island was extensively forested. The wood was hauled out using ice roads in the winter. Reforestation was started with pine and spruce. Pine is the preferred tree for forestry and also for moose, who destroyed many of the young plants. Spruce has been planted, but costs of forestry are high due to the difficulty of access to the island, and moose and deer continue to cause problems.

== Ecology ==
Halsön is mostly forested. There are some marshy areas where the ground is composed of a layer of peat moss. Pines grow here with marsh ledum (rhododendron tomentosum), crowberry and heather. Halsön also has many valuable flads and gloe lakes. These are types of brackish lagoon typical of the flat land of the Finnish part of the Kvarken Archipelago. A flad is a shallow bay where sea water only enters slowly, often obstructed by weeds and other water plants, and where fresh water dominates. As the land rises due to post-glacial rebound it becomes a gloe lake, receiving sea water only at high tide. Eventually the rising land turns the gloe lake into a freshwater lake.

The fine flads on Halsön are in various stages of development. They have abundant vegetation that gives shelter to fish fry and benthic invertebrates. They are valuable habitats for spawning coastal fish such as northern pike, roach and perch. Birds thrive in the shallow bays where they find plentiful food. Species that have been observed include northern lapwing (Vanellus vanellus), common chaffinch (Fringilla coelebs), snow bunting (Plectrophenax nivalis), greylag goose (Ansar anser), barnacle goose (Branta leucopsis) and greater scaup (Aythya marila).

== Conservation ==
The Kvarken archipelago, which includes Halsön and Molpehällor, has been designated a Unesco World Heritage Site of outstanding natural significance. A conservation area on Halsön is protected by the Nature Conservation Act under the national program for the protection of wetlands (1982). The FENIKS III projects is seeking to develop tourism in the archipelago. It includes maintenance and planning for the archipelago conservation areas to determine how the area can best be used for public recreation and tourism. The project is financed by the European Regional Development Fund and the local municipalities.
