= Gloe lake =

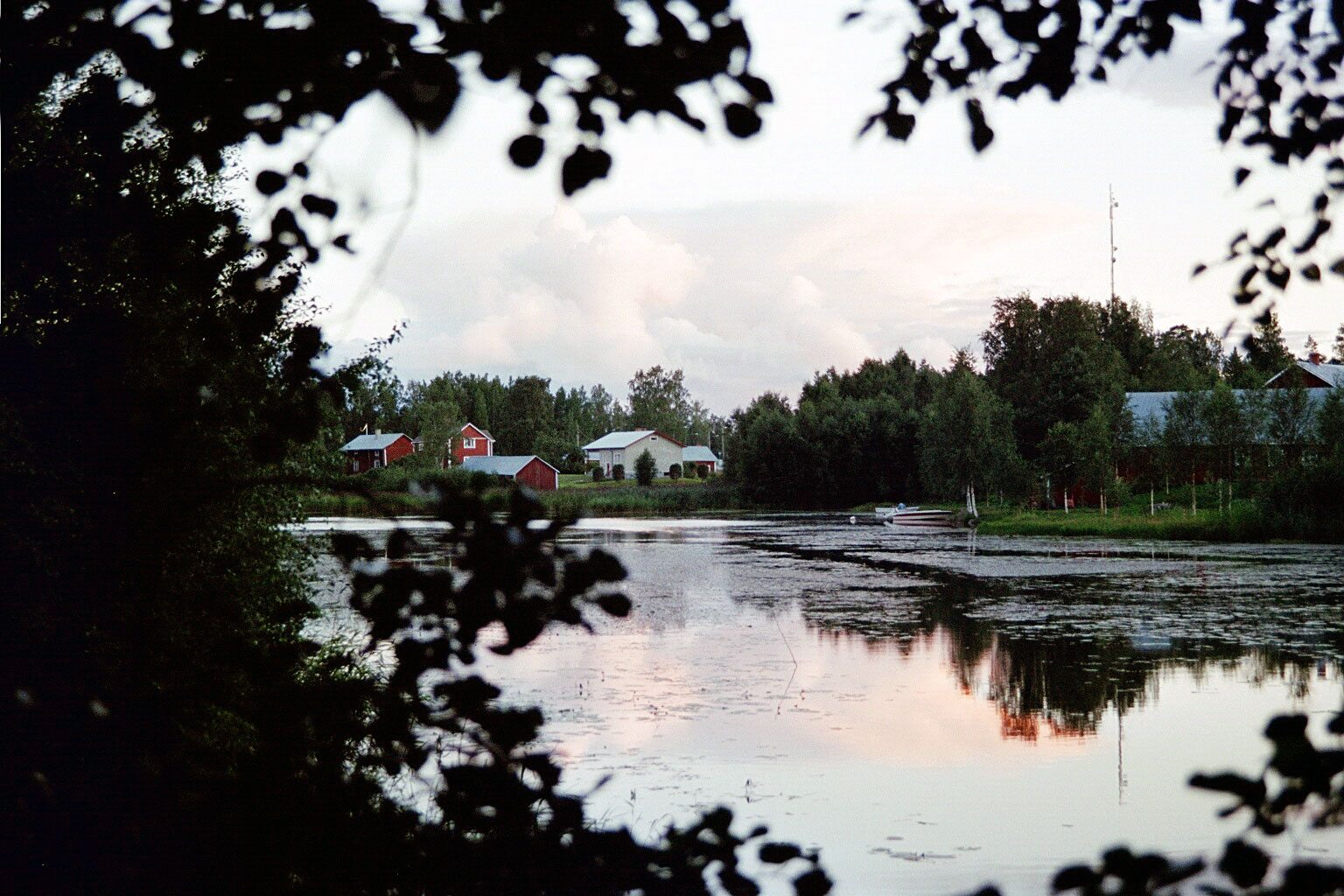
Inre fladan, a flad in Maxmo, Finland.

Flads and gloe lakes are different stages in the process where a bay in the sea turns into a freshwater lake due to post-glacial rebound.

== Location ==
Flads and gloe lakes exist in the Baltic Sea in Finland and Sweden. These types of brackish lagoon are typical of the flat land of the Finnish part of the Kvarken Archipelago. The island of Halsön, Korsnäs, in the Kvarken Archipelago of Finland includes a protected nature reserve covering an important area of flads and gloe lakes.

== Development process ==
The process can be divided into four stages, and starts with a bay with some kind of threshold sill or band of vegetation that slows the influx of water from the sea. As the land rises the threshold becomes shallower and the inflow of sea water slower.

In the stage called a flad, the bay is still in continuous contact with the sea, but the influx of sea water is very slow and the impact of fresh water becomes more important. Often reeds and other water plants make the influx of sea water even slower. In its natural state a flad functions as a refugium for species of the order Charales that are seemingly endangered in more open waters. At this stage human beings often interfere by dredging the threshold or cutting down reeds to prevent the bay from becoming a flad.

When the flad has definitely been cut off from the sea, i.e. the threshold has risen above sea level, a gloe has been formed. Sea water still enters the gloe at high tide or when storms create big enough waves. The vegetation gets scarcer in the gloe at this stage. Finally a gloe lake has been formed when the gloe no longer has any contact with the sea and doesn't get any influx of sea water. The gloe has turned into a freshwater lake.
