= Byske =

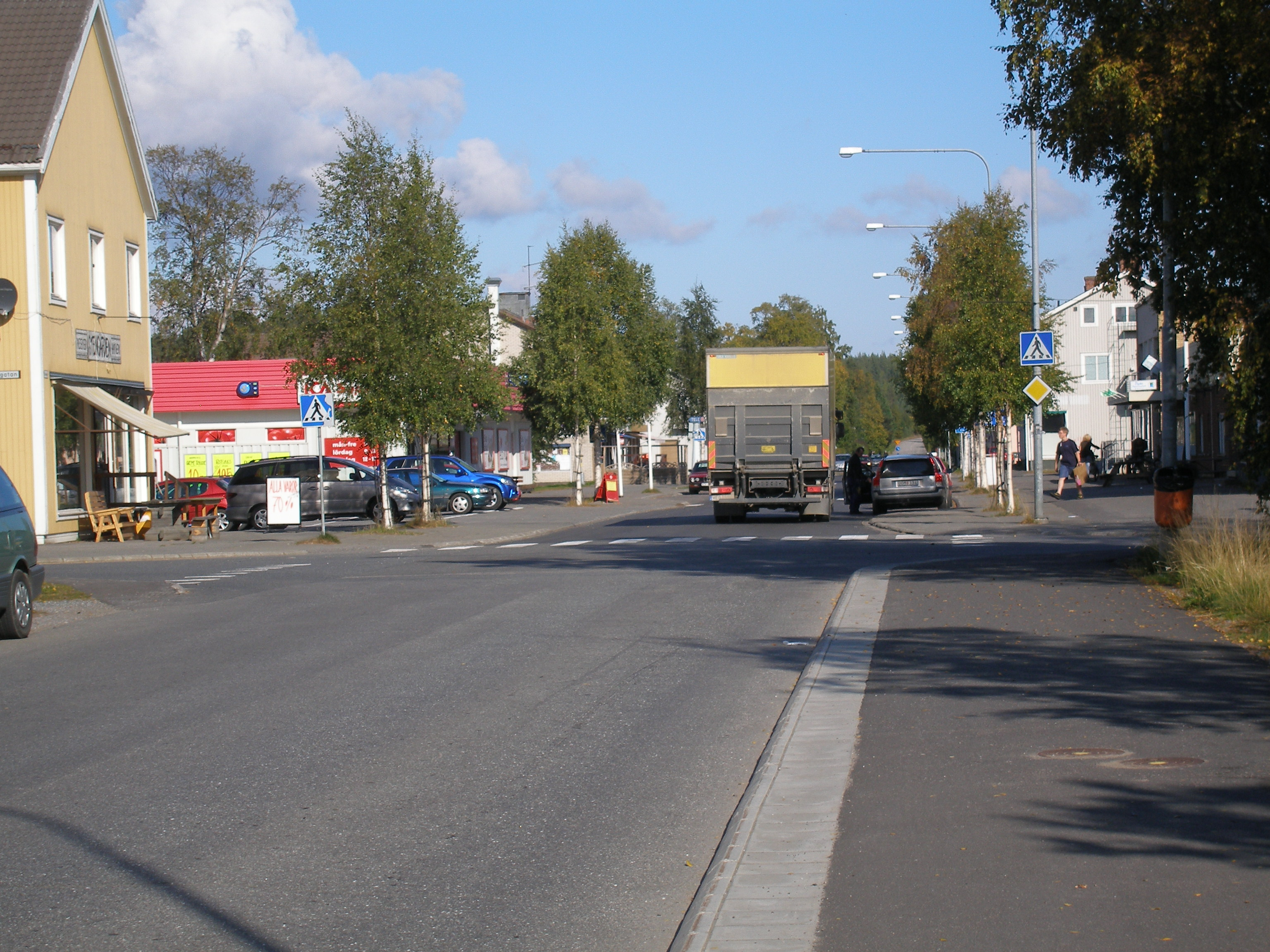
- Byske in September 2008

- Location within Västerbotten Location within Sweden
- Coordinates: 64°57′N 21°12′E
- Country: Sweden
- Province: Västerbotten
- County: Västerbotten County
- Municipality: Skellefteå Municipality

Area
  - Total: 3.21 km^{2} (1.24 sq mi)

Population (31 December 2010)
  - Total: 1,728
  - Density: 539/km^{2} (1,400/sq mi)
- Time zone: UTC+1 (CET)
  - Summer (DST): UTC+2 (CEST)

Byske (Swedish pronunciation: [ˈbʏ̂sːkɛ]) is a locality situated in Skellefteå Municipality, Västerbotten County, Sweden with 1,752 inhabitants in 2013.
