= Skellefteå Municipality =

Skellefteå Municipality Skellefteå kommun
- Municipality
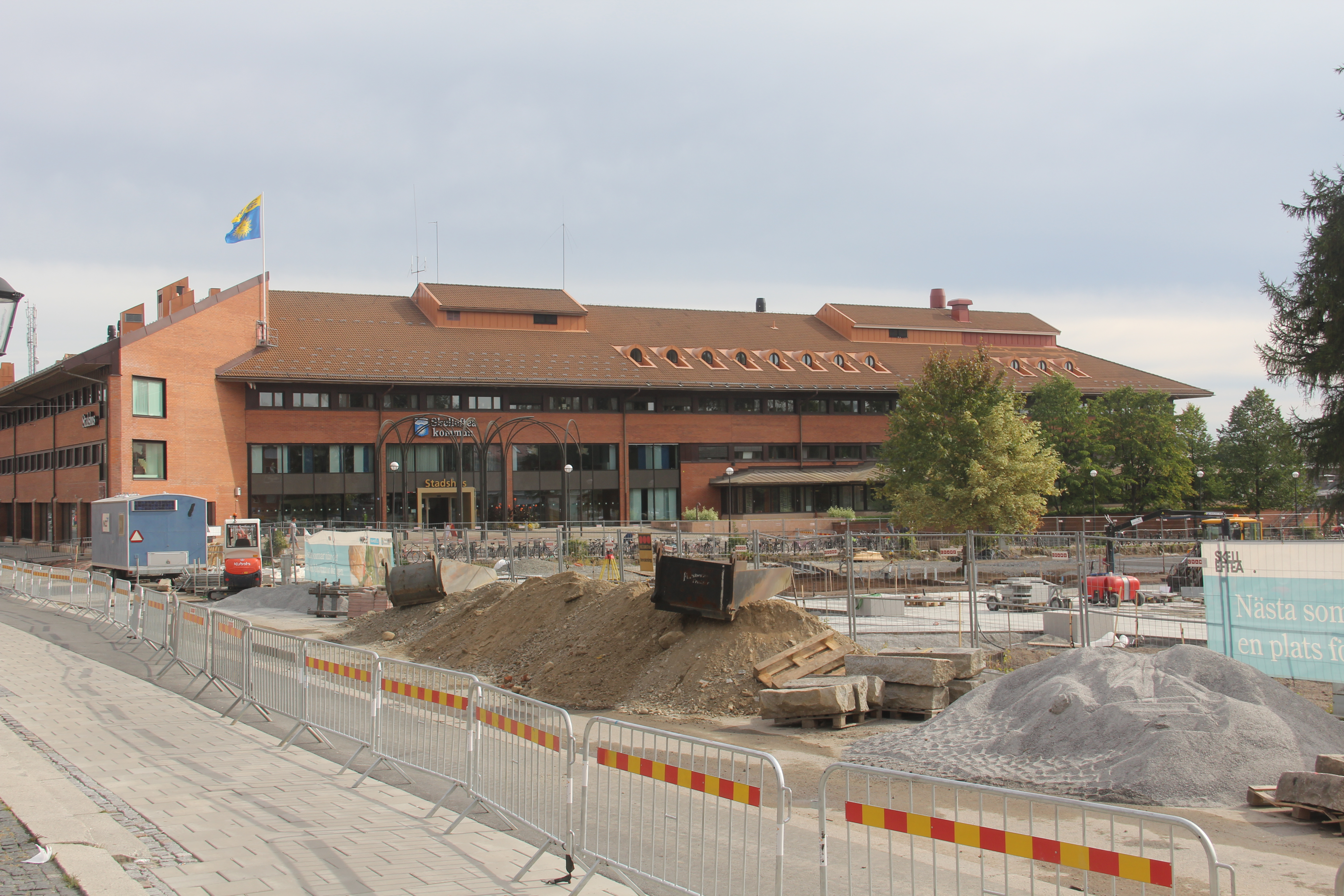
- Skellefteå town hall

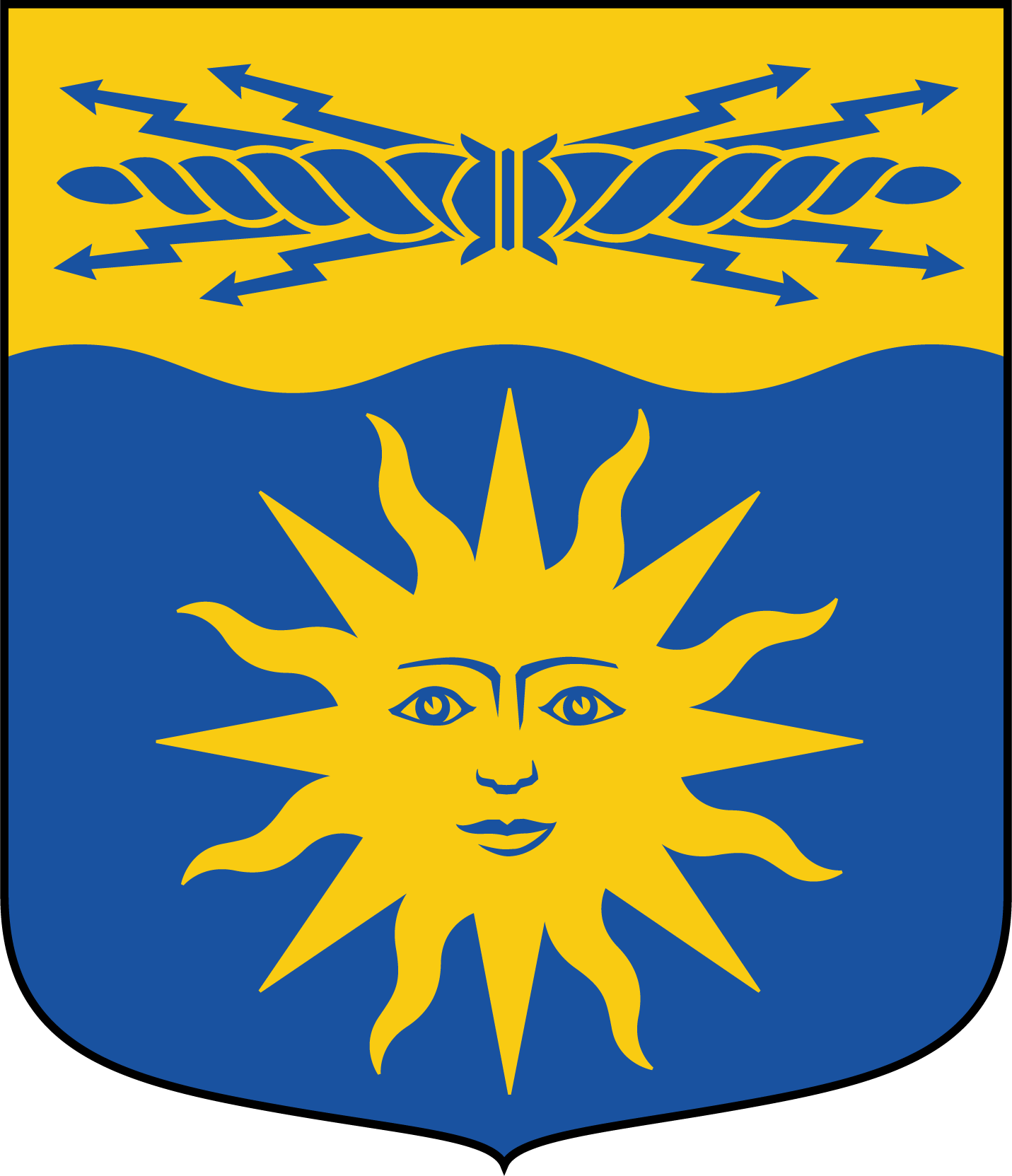
- Coat of arms

- Coordinates: 64°45′N 20°59′E
- Country: Sweden
- County: Västerbotten County
- Seat: Skellefteå

Area
  - Total: 9,955.58 km^{2} (3,843.87 sq mi)
  - Land: 6,802.85 km^{2} (2,626.60 sq mi)
  - Water: 3,152.73 km^{2} (1,217.28 sq mi)
- Area as of 1 January 2014.

Population (30 June 2025)
  - Total: 76,935
  - Density: 11.309/km^{2} (29.291/sq mi)
- Time zone: UTC+1 (CET)
  - Summer (DST): UTC+2 (CEST)
- ISO 3166 code: SE
- Province: Västerbotten
- Municipal code: 2482
- Website: www.skelleftea.se

Skellefteå Municipality (Swedish: Skellefteå kommun) is a municipality in Västerbotten County in northern Sweden. Its seat is located in Skellefteå.

== History ==
Most of the amalgamations leading to the present municipality took place in 1967 when the then "City of Skellefteå" was merged with the rural municipality by the same name and also with the municipalities Jörn, Bureå and Byske. The enlarged city became a municipality of unitary type with the new local government act in 1971, and in 1974 the municipalities Burträsk and Lövånger were added.

== Geography ==
The municipality borders in the south to Robertsfors Municipality, and clockwise to Umeå, Vindeln, Norsjö, Arvidsjaur and Piteå municipalities. Skellefteå is the largest coastline municipality by area, being roughly 15 percent larger than the second largest, Örnsköldsvik Municipality.

Skellefteå is situated around Skellefte River, a river that runs through the city. There is also a very central mountain, Vitberget, which is popular for skiing in the wintertime, and hiking in the summer.

=== Localities ===
There are 20 localities (or urban areas) in Skellefteå Municipality:

#	Locality	Population
1	**Skellefteå**	32,425
2	Ursviken	4,054
3	Skelleftehamn	3,120
4	Bureå	2,345
5	Kåge	2,205
6	Bergsbyn	1,818
7	Byske	1,731
8	Burträsk	1,632
9	Boliden	1,515
10	Jörn	877
11	Ersmark	865
12	Lövånger	779
13	Medle	558
14	Kusmark	437
15	Örviken	411
16	Södra Bergsbyn och Stackgrönnan	406
17	Ostvik	392
18	Bygdsiljum	370
19	Drängsmark	353
20	Myckle	343

The municipal seat in bold

== Economy ==
The largest employer in Skellefteå Municipality is the mining company Boliden AB, with about 1,200 employees, in some mines around Boliden and two metallurgical plants, one in Boliden and the other one, Rönnskärsverken near Skelleftehamn. Alimak produces elevators.

== Elections ==
=== Riksdag ===
These are the results of the elections to the Riksdag for Skellefteå Municipality since the 1972 municipal reform. SCB did not publish the party's results for the Sweden Democrats between 1988 and 1998 because of the party's small size nationally.

Year	Turnout	Votes	V	S	MP	C	L	KD	M	SD	ND
1973	89.9	45,977	3.8	49.4	0.0	24.8	9.1	3.7	8.6	0.0	0.0
1976	90.7	49,133	3.4	49.8	0.0	24.8	9.7	3.1	8.8	0.0	0.0
1979	90.8	49,788	4.1	51.3	0.0	20.6	10.0	3.3	10.1	0.0	0.0
1982	90.9	50,472	4.1	54.5	0.9	18.6	6.8	3.6	11.3	0.0	0.0
1985	89.8	50,354	4.9	53.1	0.8	17.4	13.7	0.0	9.6	0.0	0.0
1988	86.5	48,522	5.4	52.9	3.5	14.3	10.9	5.0	7.2	0.0	0.0
1991	87.2	49,170	4.8	50.6	2.3	13.1	9.0	8.3	8.9	0.0	2.8
1994	88.0	50,073	7.4	57.1	4.7	9.6	6.9	4.6	8.9	0.0	0.3
1998	83.0	46,467	15.5	48.5	4.0	6.2	4.8	10.2	9.1	0.0	0.0
2002	81.4	44,967	11.4	50.6	3.5	10.2	9.4	8.4	5.0	0.4	0.0
2006	83.3	45,981	8.9	50.3	4.3	10.1	6.0	6.3	11.0	1.4	0.0
2010	85.6	48,020	9.5	49.6	5.8	6.0	5.7	5.4	14.3	2.9	0.0
2014	86.7	48,779	9.3	50.2	5.3	5.8	3.8	4.0	10.7	7.8	0.0

Blocs

This lists the relative strength of the socialist and centre-right blocs since 1973, but parties not elected to the Riksdag are inserted as "other", including the Sweden Democrats results from 1988 to 2006, but also the Christian Democrats pre-1991 and the Greens in 1982, 1985 and 1991. The sources are identical to the table above. The coalition or government mandate marked in bold formed the government after the election. New Democracy got elected in 1991 but are still listed as "other" due to the short lifespan of the party.

Year	Turnout	Votes	Left	Right	SD	Other	Elected
1973	89.9	45,977	**53.2**	42.5	0.0	4.3	95.7
1976	90.7	49,133	53.2	**43.3**	0.0	3.5	96.5
1979	90.8	49,788	55.4	**40.7**	0.0	3.9	96.1
1982	90.9	50,472	**58.6**	36.7	0.0	4.7	95.3
1985	89.8	50,354	**58.0**	39.7	0.0	2.1	97.7
1988	86.5	48,522	**61.8**	32.4	0.0	5.8	94.2
1991	87.2	49,170	55.4	**39.3**	0.0	5.3	97.5
1994	88.0	50,073	**69.2**	30.0	0.0	0.8	99.2
1998	83.0	46,467	**68.0**	30.3	0.0	1.7	98.3
2002	81.4	44,967	**65.5**	33.0	0.0	3.5	96.5
2006	83.3	45,981	63.5	**33.4**	0.0	3.1	96.9
2010	85.6	48,020	64.9	**31.4**	2.9	0.8	99.2
2014	86.7	48,779	**64.8**	24.3	7.8	3.1	96.9

== Demographics ==
This is a demographic table based on Skellefteå Municipality's electoral districts in the 2022 Swedish general election sourced from SVT's election platform, in turn taken from SCB official statistics.

There were 73,333 residents, including 56,888 Swedish citizens of voting age. 63.1% voted for the left coalition and 35.7% for the right coalition. Indicators are in percentage points except population totals and income.

Location	Residents	Citizen adults	Left vote	Right vote	Employed	Swedish parents	Foreign heritage	Income SEK	Degree
Location			%	%					
Alhem-Norrbacka	1,386	1,183	62.9	36.4	86	93	7	28,511	48
Anderstorp N	1,334	1,053	66.0	33.0	71	77	23	21,600	33
Anderstorp S	1,680	1,131	69.8	29.2	80	85	15	23,768	33
Anderstorp Ö	1,581	1,437	70.3	27.8	67	73	27	21,206	36
Bergsbyn	1,764	1,290	63.0	36.1	91	95	5	29,755	48
Boliden	2,038	1,400	56.8	41.2	72	73	27	22,211	28
Brännan-Mobacken	1,782	1,350	68.8	30.7	86	93	7	28,970	57
Bureå N	1,484	1,114	69.4	29.3	82	92	8	24,256	34
Bureå S	1,373	1,021	57.8	40.5	81	87	13	25,274	31
Burträsk C	1,822	1,389	63.4	35.9	80	85	15	21,938	25
Burträskbygden	2,327	1,852	59.8	39.3	83	92	8	25,042	32
Byske C	1,792	1,370	60.7	37.5	80	87	13	22,630	28
Byske-Fällfors	1,440	1,239	57.0	42.0	85	94	6	23,842	24
Centrum N	1,411	1,327	59.1	39.8	81	88	12	26,935	44
Centrum S	1,714	1,529	65.1	33.9	76	89	11	24,095	47
Drängsmark-Ostvik	1,761	1,338	60.2	39.3	87	97	3	28,124	31
Erikslid	1,903	1,606	67.6	31.9	79	90	10	25,245	48
Getberget-Norrvalla	1,558	1,310	67.2	32.0	85	90	10	26,782	41
Hjoggböle	1,515	1,154	55.4	43.1	88	96	4	26,466	33
Jörn	1,229	975	63.1	36.3	75	85	15	20,833	24
Kåge N	1,470	1,071	63.7	35.9	89	92	8	27,248	40
Kåge S	1,677	1,318	57.3	42.1	87	95	5	29,053	41
Kågedalen	2,112	1,642	57.5	41.8	90	95	5	26,915	27
Lövånger	2,141	1,613	63.1	36.0	79	84	16	21,900	34
Morö Backe C	1,628	1,161	67.3	31.2	62	68	32	17,689	22
Morö Backe V	1,307	916	61.3	38.3	94	92	8	30,028	53
Morö Backe Ö	1,767	1,247	65.0	34.4	88	91	9	29,119	47
Moröhöjden	1,135	1,028	64.8	35.2	83	90	10	24,480	38
Morön-Hedensbyn	1,520	1,101	70.6	28.7	92	94	6	30,890	49
Myckle-Medle	1,189	893	60.9	38.0	89	95	5	28,826	49
Norrhammar	1,524	1,334	67.2	32.1	84	91	9	26,974	47
Prästbordet	1,803	1,519	65.7	33.3	83	89	11	25,213	43
Sjungande Dalen	1,763	1,368	68.7	30.4	80	83	17	24,444	47
Skelleftehamn V	1,501	1,028	61.3	37.2	78	80	20	24,371	25
Skelleftehamn Ö	1,736	1,224	65.2	32.0	71	74	26	21,528	26
Skråmträsk-Klutmark	1,381	1,066	54.9	44.1	88	95	5	28,028	36
Stackgrännan-Örviken	1,592	1,183	58.3	40.1	91	94	6	30,052	43
Stämningsgården	1,629	1,187	65.2	34.0	83	90	10	28,270	46
Sunnanå C	2,033	1,508	67.3	32.1	88	93	7	28,848	54
Sunnanå S	1,682	1,329	62.9	36.1	88	94	6	30,161	48
Sörböle	1,301	944	64.8	34.3	86	91	9	29,729	47
Ursviken	2,400	1,810	62.9	35.5	85	91	9	26,883	38
Yttre Ursviken	1,586	1,156	66.5	32.3	90	94	6	29,447	44
Älvsbacka V	1,288	1,112	62.4	36.3	80	85	15	25,341	44
Älvsbacka Ö	1,274	1,062	63.3	35.9	86	91	9	29,144	48
Source: SVT

== Twin towns – sister cities ==
Skellefteå is twinned with:

- Pardubice, Czech Republic
- Raahe, Finland
- Rana, Norway
- Tongling, China
- Vesthimmerland, Denmark

== Notable natives ==
- Jan Erixon, ice hockey player
- Andreas Hedlund, musician
- Stieg Larsson, journalist and author of The Girl with the Dragon Tattoo
- Joakim Nyström, tennis player
- Victoria Silvstedt, model
- Margot Wallström, politician
- The Wannadies, pop group

== See also ==
- Norra Västerbotten, local newspaper
- Skellefteå AIK, local sports club, mostly famous for ice hockey
