= Getå railroad disaster =

1918 train derailment in Getå, Sweden

Coordinates: 58°39′55″N 16°15′12″E

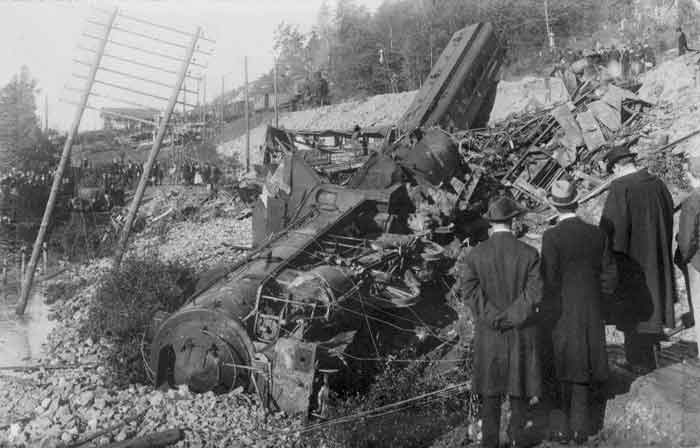
- The F 1200 has jumped the embankment, landing on the road below. The gutted front cars can be seen behind the locomotive while the dining car is resting on the embankment at a 45° angle.

Details
- Date: 1 October 1918
- Location: Getå
- Country: Sweden
- Incident type: Derailment
- Cause: Landslide

Statistics
- Trains: 1
- Passengers: 170
- Deaths: 42
- Injured: 41

The Getå railroad disaster (Swedish: Järnvägsolyckan i Getå) was a train disaster caused by a landslide in Getå, a town that is now part of the municipality of Norrköping, on 1 October 1918. To date, it is the worst rail accident in Swedish history.

The derailment occurred when the layers of colloidal clay and gravel in the embankment that had been cut into the hill gave way. Shortly afterwards, a mixed train consisting of a locomotive and ten cars came down the tracks, falling down the embankment and landing on the road below. Of the passengers and crew on board that night, 41 people were injured and at least 42 were killed or died later from injuries sustained in the crash. It is unclear how many died in the derailment compared to those who died in the blaze that followed it. Many of the passengers were burned alive as the unreinforced wooden cars caught fire, killing those who had survived the crash itself but were still trapped in the wreckage.

== Background ==
The railway line between Åby and Nyköping had been opened exactly five years before, on 1 October 1913. In conjunction with the construction of the stretch between Åby and Krokek, geological surveys had been carried out since an existing geological fault in the area posed a risk of the ground collapsing from underneath it down towards the shore of Bråviken Bay. The spring of 1918 had been dry, causing the mean water level of Bråviken to have dropped and the ground to have dried out, which in turn caused the ground to crack. September was, on the other hand, unusually rainy, enough so that the ground was saturated. The embankment was built on top of layers of clay, whose bearing capacity had been diminished due to the rains as the ground grew heavier. On 1 October 1918, the ground started to collapse when a layer of surge gravel started to slip against a layer of clay. The railway embankment collapsed, taking the road below with it. This caused the underlying layers to be pushed up, raising up the floor of the bay and causing a small peninsula to be formed.

== Events ==
A train passed through Getå at 6:26 p.m. without any problems. The first sign of trouble came when the station guard on duty at Getå Halt heard the telephone wires vibrating between 6:33 and 6:40. At around 6:50 p.m., a milk cart went by the site; no collapse was noticed. Between 6:52 and 6:55 the clay stratum under the embankment gave way and collapsed. At approximately 6:55, the telegraph network that ran along the railway line came down.

Train 422 had left Malmö at 7:00 a.m heading for Stockholm. In Mjölby, its original locomotive, F 1271, was replaced by F 1200. The train arrived in Norrköping twelve minutes late.

In Sweden, the next station down the line was always contacted by telegraph using the signal "tåg ut" once a train had left the previous station. Although Train 422 was supposed to have left Åby at 6:44 p.m., it did not leave until 6:54, since it had been late in arriving. Shortly after this, the station in Krokek tried to contact Åby to see why it had not received any "tåg ut" from it, but it could not reach Åby Station. At 6:57 Åby Station tried to contact Krokek Station to say that the train had left, but it was as unsuccessful in reaching Krokek Station as Krokek had been in reaching it.

The train's speed at the time of derailment was an estimated 65 to 70 kilometres per hour (40 to 43 mph). The F 1200 locomotive was the first to derail, sliding down the embankment until it came to rest on its right side on the road below. The cars between the locomotive and the dining car were completely destroyed while the dining car partially slid down the embankment towards the road, ending up at a 45° angle on the slope between the embankment and the road. The last two cars remained standing on the tracks.

Wahlström, the engineer, hit his head when the train derailed. In spite of the concussion he had sustained, he managed to drag himself out of the locomotive to safety. The train's conductor, Mr. Ström, was in the last passenger car at the time of the accident. He disembarked and headed towards the locomotive. When he got nearby, he found Wahlström, who informed him that the stoker, Carlsson, was buried under the coal.

Ström headed off towards Åby to inform them of the accident and met Mr. Andersson, a track walker. From a nearby house, Andersson called Åby and notified them of the accident. Track walker Eriksson arrived from his house east of the accident site. His wife had lowered the boom barrier at the railway crossing and was standing and waiting for the train when she thought it sounded as if the train had stopped, so Eriksson quickly went to the site of the derailment. Once he saw that the telegraph poles were aslant, he knew that something serious had occurred. Upon seeing that the train had derailed, he hurried to Getå Halt to notify Krokek Station what had occurred.

Meanwhile, embers from the locomotive's boiler had started to ignite the dry wood in the shattered cars closest to the locomotive. Although many of the people in the cars managed to get out, others perished as the fire spread. Of the approximately 170 people on board, 42 perished. In addition, five people were reported missing. The line was closed to traffic because of the derailment from 1 October 1918, until 21 December 1918.

== Investigation ==
The day after the accident, the Royal Railroad Board launched an inquiry into the cause of the accident by interviewing the surviving employees who had been working on the train. A number of passengers also came forward to be interviewed for the inquiry upon seeing the advertisement the board had placed in the newspapers. One of the key aims of the inquiry was to establish whether or not acetylene gas, which had been used in lighting, had caused the fire. The inquiry came to the conclusion, however, that burning coal had been responsible for setting the splintered wood of the train cars on fire.

In addition, the Geotechnical Commission of the Swedish State Railways launched an investigation into the cause of the accident, albeit from a geological perspective. The embankment had been built on top of several layers of clay and gravel deposited there during the Ice Age. The commission drilled holes to the bedrock in a number of places. These revealed the remains of a prehistoric landslide under the place where the train derailed. This prehistoric landslide had increased the flow of water in that spot, which had, in turn, contributed to the landslide that had caused the accident. These exceptional circumstances might have caused the engineers building the line to believe that the bearing capacity of the soil was greater than it actually was. In 1923, another landslide occurred in the same place, this time causing the road running along Bråvik Bay to collapse.

Geotechnically, the accident was investigated by performing both test drilling and strength calculations on site. The investigation into the cause of the accident had a major impact on the development of the field of geotechnics in Sweden. The scene of the accident was cleared in autumn 1918 so that the train line could be reopened by December. This was made possible by shifting the track one metre towards the side of the mountain and by reinforcing the embankment with rocks. At the site of the accident, the speed limit was lowered to 15 km/h, with the speed limit on either side of that stretch of track being 30 km/h. In modern times, the speed limit has been set at a flat 100 km/h.

== The train ==
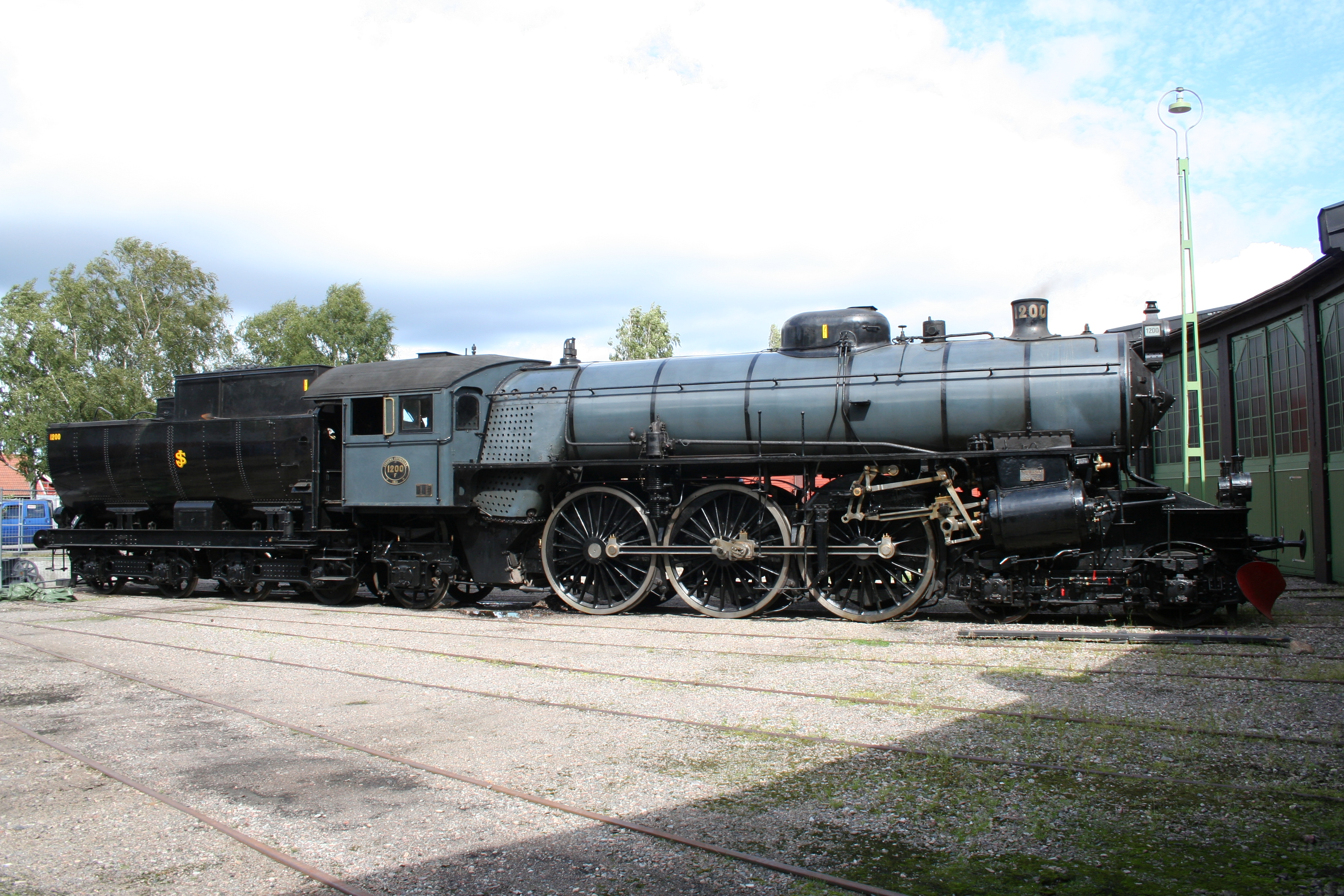
The F 1200 locomotive in 2008

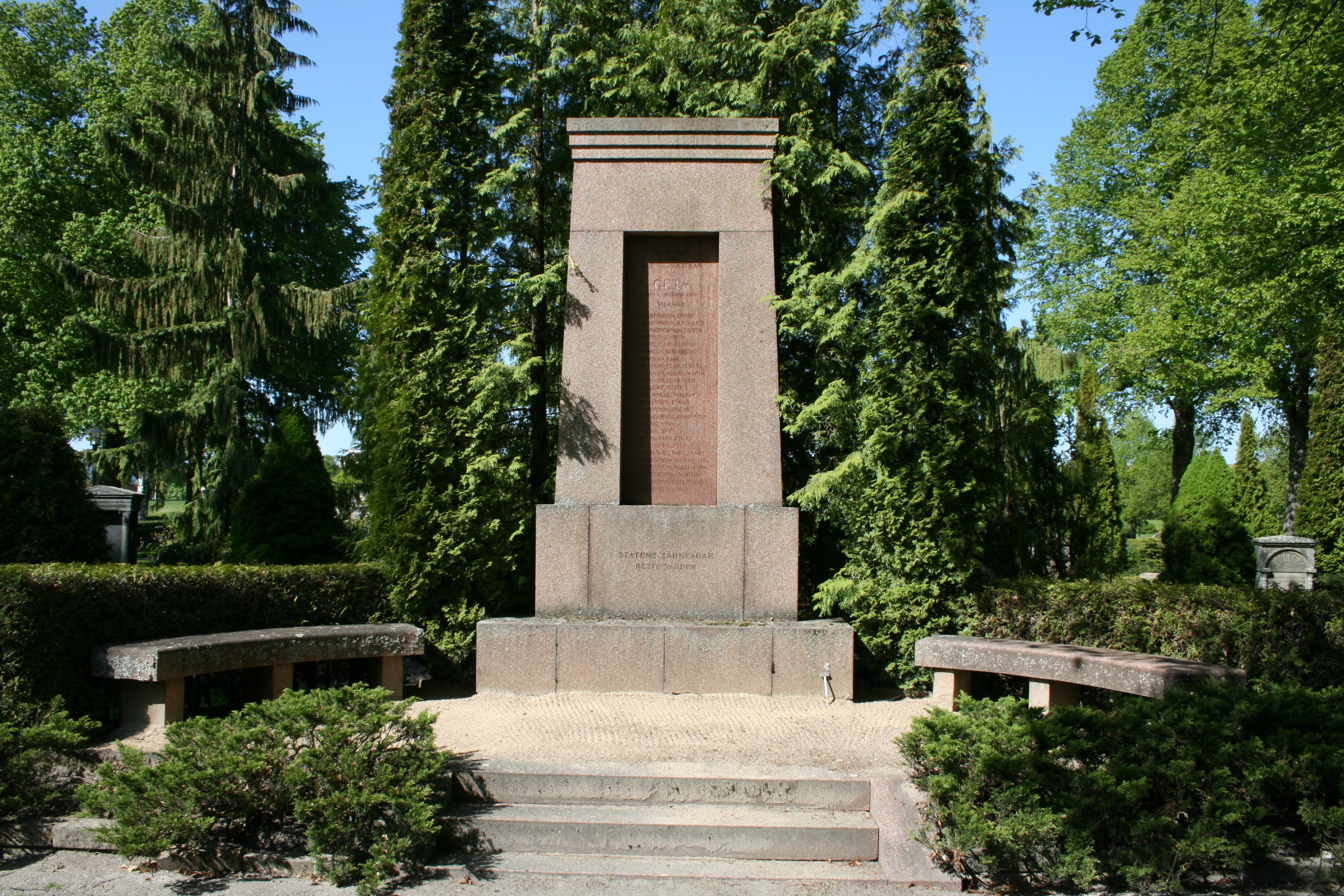
The mass grave at Norra kyrkogården, a cemetery in Norrköping, Sweden

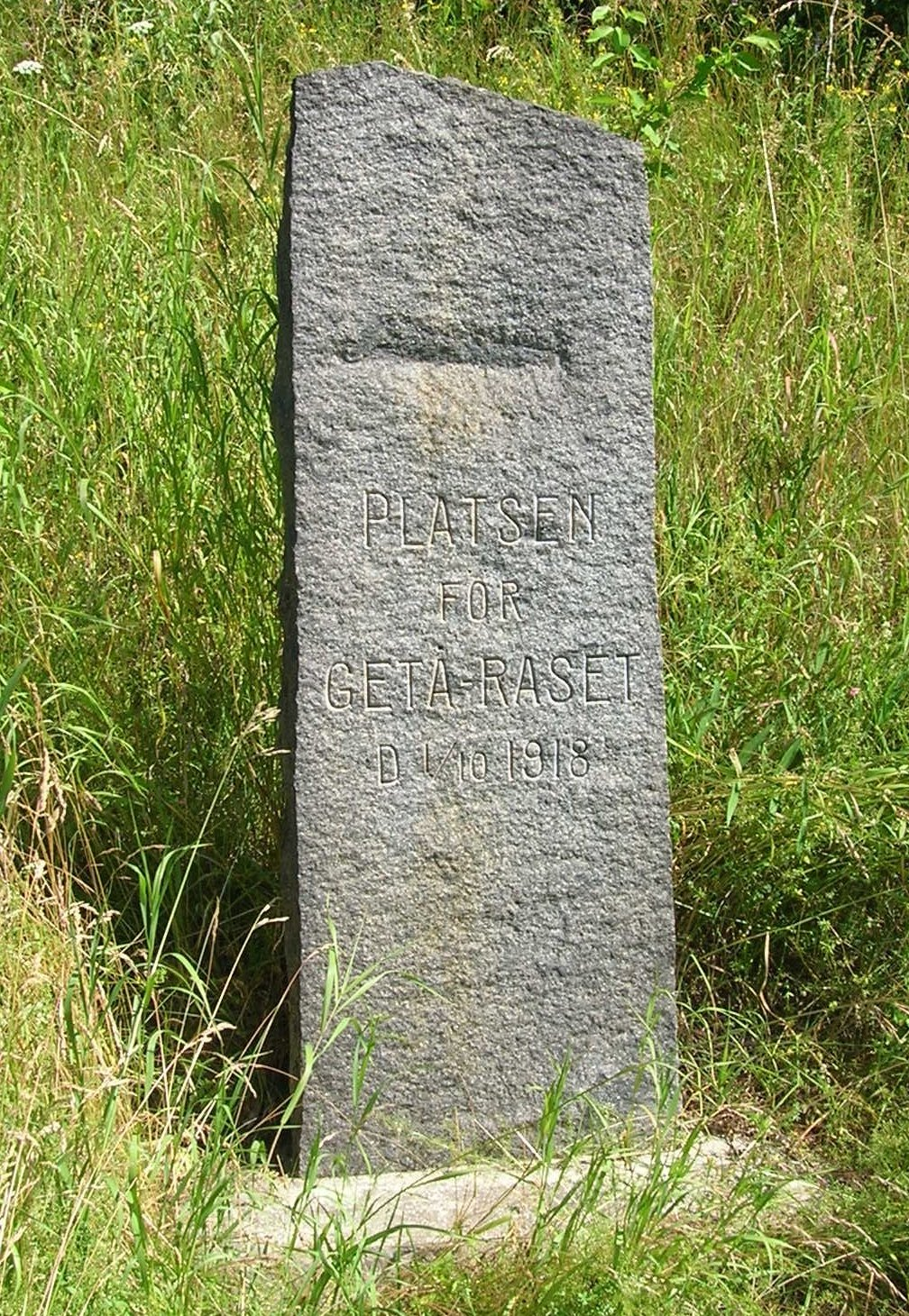
A monument to the accident on site.

The derailed train consisted of the locomotive and 10 cars:

- The steam locomotive F 1200 (currently on display at the Swedish Railway Museum in Gävle).
- RPO DFo 1107 (destroyed)
- Freight car F1 25591 (destroyed)
- Passenger car C3d 2050 (destroyed)
- Passenger car Co5 2039 (destroyed)
- Passenger car Co1 1235 (destroyed)
- Passenger car Co5 2044 (destroyed)
- Dining car ABo3 2466 (repaired after the accident, scrapped in 1960)
- Sleeping car Bo1 1015 (undamaged, scrapped in 1949)
- Passenger car BCo 1429 (undamaged, scrapped in 1963)
- Extra freight car G3 19003 (undamaged, scrapped in 1952)

The majority of those who perished were in cars 2039 and 1235. These had smashed into each other as the train derailed.

=== The locomotive ===
The locomotive remained on site until 15 November. Once it had been overhauled, it was test driven on 21 May 1919, and remained in service with the Swedish State Railways until 1937 when it was sold for 30,876 DKK to the Danish State Railways, which continued to use it for many years to come. On 21 April 1943, it was hit in an air raid near Korsør, Denmark. In 1963, the locomotive was returned to Sweden, where it is currently on display at the Swedish Railway Museum in Gävle.

== Monuments ==
There are two monuments to those who perished in the derailment and the subsequent fire that engulfed the cars. The first is at the site of the accident along the old road between Åby and Sandviken. The second is located at Norra kyrkogården, a cemetery in Norrköping. The mass grave is marked by a 5 m high red granite stone from Graversfors and contains the remains of 15 identified victims as well as those of the unidentified victims.
