= Håkan Ericson =

Swedish footballer and manager

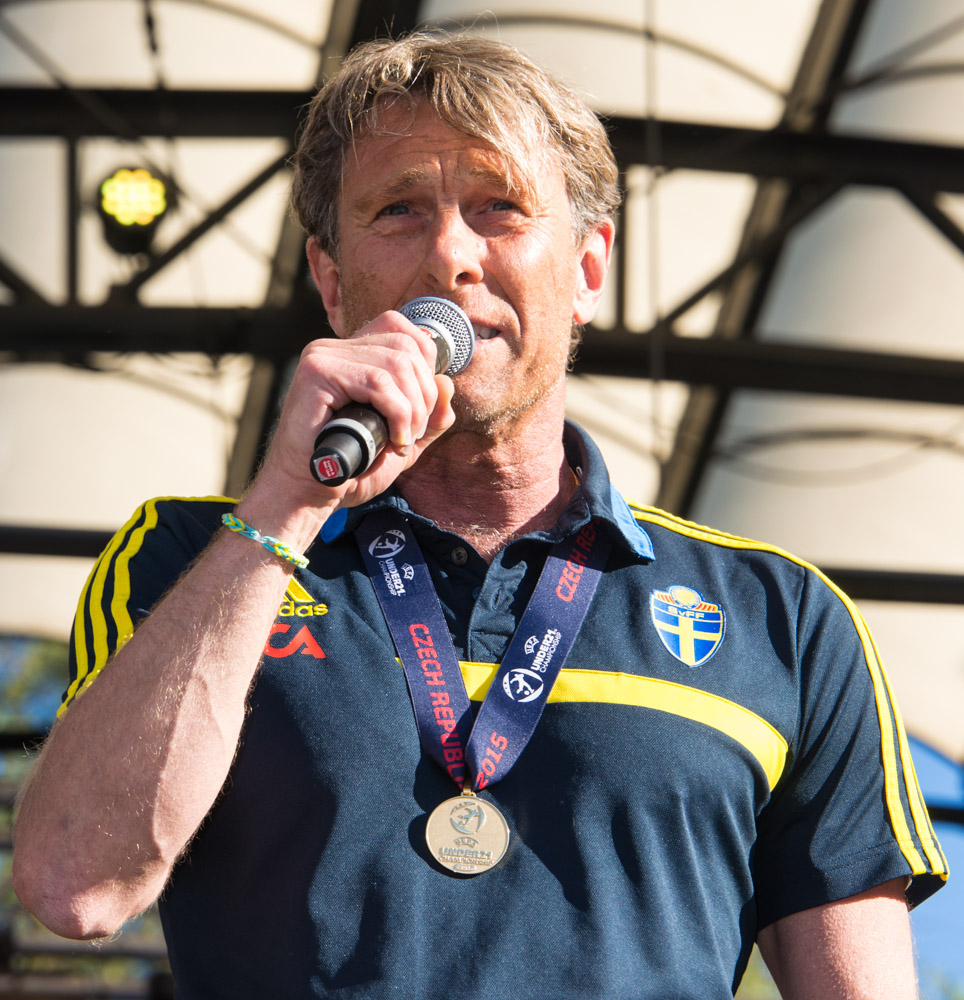
- Ericson with the Sweden U21 in 2015

Personal information
- Full name: Håkan Georg Ericson
- Date of birth: 29 May 1960 (age 66)
- Place of birth: Åby, Norrköping, Sweden

Team information
- Current team: Faroe Islands (manager)

Youth career
- Åby IF

Senior career*
Years	Team	Apps	(Gls)
- Åby IF
- FK Kick
- IK Sleipner

Managerial career
- 1983–1985: FK Kick
- 1986: Täby IS (U18 team)
- 1987: Råsunda IS
- 1988–1989: AIK (assistant manager)
- 1990–1991: Väsby IK
- 1992: Vasalunds IF
- 1993–1995: Väsby IK
- 1997–1998: Motala AIF
- 1999–2000: Nacka FF
- 2001–2003: IFK Norrköping
- 2009: Sweden U21 (Younger)
- 2011–2017: Sweden U21
- 2016: Sweden Olympic
- 2019–2024: Faroe Islands
Medal record
Men's football
Representing Sweden (as manager)
UEFA European Under-21 Championship
Winner	2015
- * Club domestic league appearances and goals

Håkan Georg Ericson (born 29 May 1960) is a Swedish football manager and the former manager of the Faroe Islands national team. During his playing career, he played for Åby IF, FK Kick and IK Sleipner. He is son of former Sweden national team coach Georg Ericson.

== Honours ==
=== Manager ===
Sweden

- UEFA European Under-21 Championship: 2015

== Managerial statistics ==
As of match played 14 November 2024

Team	From	To	Record				
Team	From	To	G	W	D	L	Win %
Faroe Islands	16 December 2019	16 October 2024	49	10	13	26	20.41
