= Strandhugget =

- Location within Östergötland Location within Sweden
- Coordinates: 58°35′30″N 16°05′00″E
- Country: Sweden
- Province: Östergötland
- County: Östergötland County
- Municipality: Norrköping Municipality

Area
  - Total: 0.23 km^{2} (0.089 sq mi)

Population (31 December 2010)
  - Total: 261
  - Density: 1,138/km^{2} (2,950/sq mi)
- Time zone: UTC+1 (CET)
  - Summer (DST): UTC+2 (CEST)

Strandhugget (or Almborga) is a locality situated in Norrköping Municipality, Östergötland County, Sweden with 261 inhabitants in 2010.
