= Krokek =

- Location within Östergötland Location within Sweden
- Coordinates: 58°40′N 16°24′E
- Country: Sweden
- Province: Östergötland
- County: Östergötland County
- Municipality: Norrköping Municipality

Area
  - Total: 4.24 km^{2} (1.64 sq mi)

Population (2023)
  - Total: 5,125
  - Density: 1,210/km^{2} (3,130/sq mi)
- Time zone: UTC+1 (CET)
  - Summer (DST): UTC+2 (CEST)

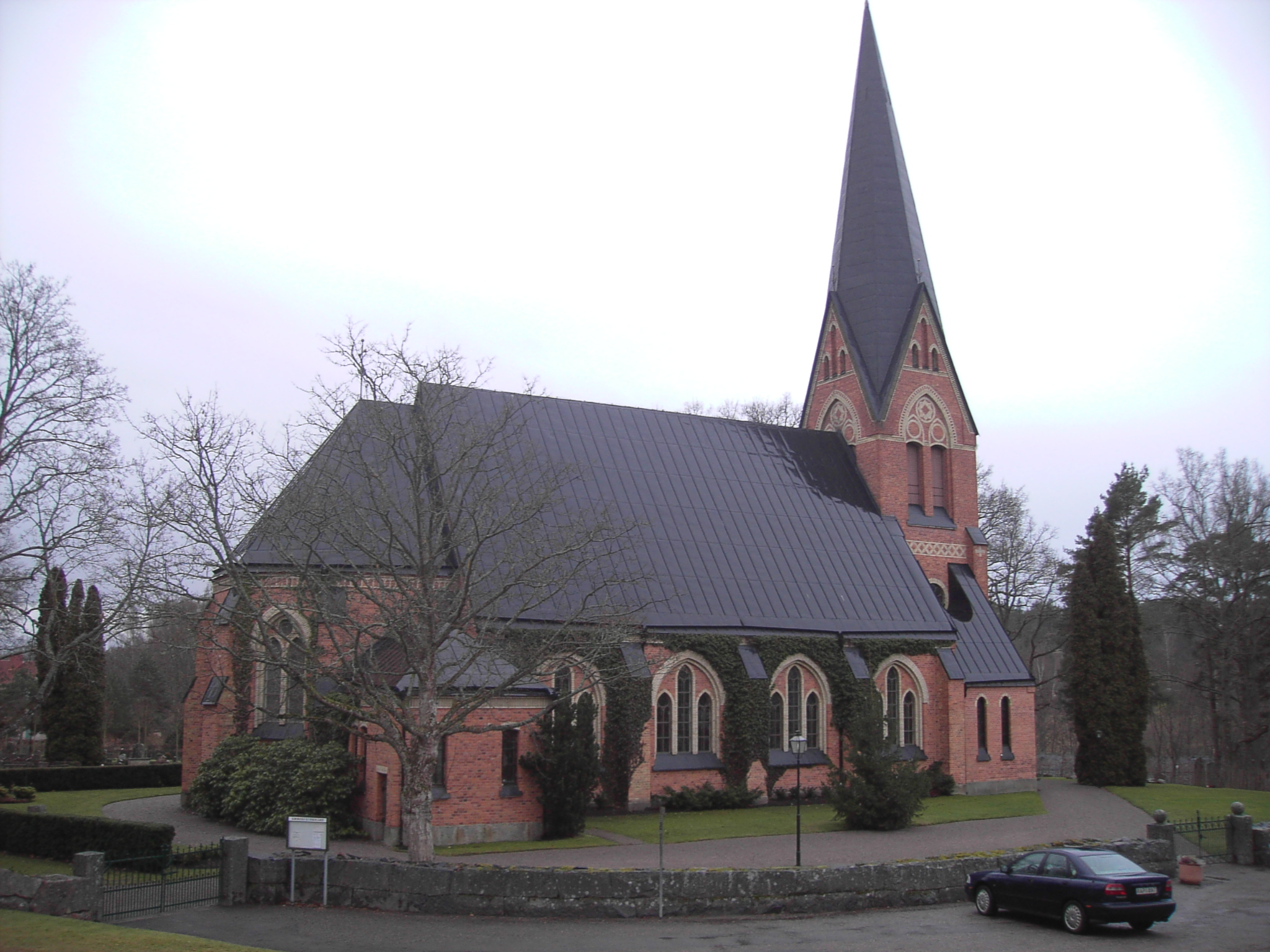
Church of Krokek in Kolmården, diocese of Linköping

Krokek is a locality situated in Norrköping Municipality, Östergötland County, Sweden with 4,285 inhabitants in 2010. It is the main settlement of Kolmården and located a few kilometres away from the Sörmland border. The place's name comes from krokig ek, which refers to a crooked oak at the border between Östergötland and Sörmland.

== History ==
The area has an extensive history, with multiple settlements dating back to the Stone Age. There are also a few gravefields dating back to the Iron Age, which indicates a farm settlement 1,000-2,000 years ago. One of the great battles mentioned from the iron age, battle of Brávellir is said to have occurred outside of Krokek. The name Kolmården, the large forest in which Krokek is situated in is mentioned in writings from the 11th century. It can be roughly translated into modern swedish as "Den mörka skogen" (The dark forest). The names of other parts in Krokek often originates from the late Middle Ages and forward, with some exceptions such as Svintuna.

The name Krokek (literally translated as crooked oak), originates from an oak that was used as a marking on the border of Östergötland and Södermanland. This is noted in several medieval diplomas and in connection with the late monastery of Krokek, which was established in the 1420s-1440s. What is thought to be the oak in question split during a storm in 1902, and a 6 meter tall, hollow trunk stood until it was cut down in 1912. After it was cut, the stump was measured to be 785 centimeter in diameter. The oak was situated east of an old church, Krokeks Ödekyrka, which used to belong to the monastery. The church is also known as Kung Fredriks kyrka (King Fredriks church).

=== Railway ===
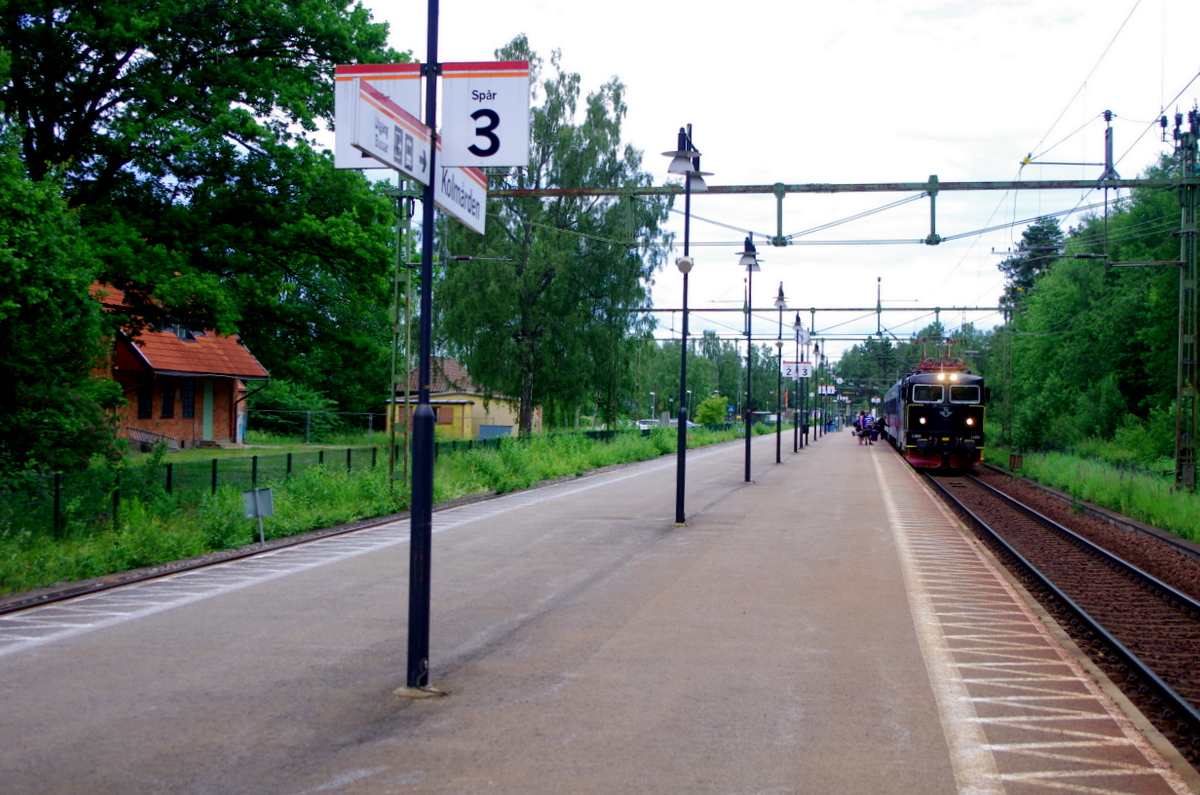
Kolmården station in Krokek. On the left is the old stationhouse.

The railway section between Nyköping and Norrköping runs and stops through Krokek. The name of the station in Krokek has been Kolmården station since 2000. It was along this railway that the Getå railroad disaster occurred, Sweden's worst train accident to date.

== Riksdag elections ==
Year	%	Votes	V	S	MP	C	L	KD	M	SD	NyD	Left	Right
1973	87.5	2,247	4.0	45.9		26.6	6.2	2.9	14.1			49.9	46.8
1976	91.1	2,527	2.5	42.9		27.0	10.2	2.3	15.1			45.4	51.5
1979	91.0	2,742	3.2	43.4		19.5	11.8	1.8	19.1			46.6	50.4
1982	91.7	2,918	3.3	47.3	2.0	15.0	5.5	2.1	24.9			50.6	45.3
1985	90.6	3,089	3.2	46.6	1.9	11.6	13.8		22.9			49.8	48.3
1988	86.1	2,987	4.0	45.5	6.0	9.2	12.4	3.2	19.4			55.4	40.9
1991	87.1	3,354	3.3	36.0	3.6	8.1	7.4	7.7	25.2		7.8	39.3	48.3
1994	88.2	3,538	5.1	45.5	7.2	5.9	4.7	4.0	24.4		1.8	57.3	39.0
1998	82.5	3,379	11.1	36.3	7.8	3.5	2.1	12.7	23.8			54.4	42.1
2002	82.6	3,382	7.4	41.7	6.6	4.3	10.6	10.1	16.6	1.2		55.6	41.6
2006	85.2	3,582	5.3	32.9	6.1	6.6	5.3	7.5	27.7	3.6		44.3	47.1
2010	86.9	3,862	3.7	28.2	8.0	5.3	6.5	7.0	33.1	7.0		39.9	52.0
2014	88.9	4,017	4.0	28.0	6.9	4.8	4.8	4.5	25.0	18.9		38.9	38.9
2018	89.2	4,151	5.8	26.0	4.5	6.6	4.9	6.5	21.9	22.1		42.8	55.4

== See also ==
- Kolmården Wildlife Park
