= Skriketorp =

- Location within Östergötland Location within Sweden
- Coordinates: 58°40′57″N 16°08′46″E
- Country: Sweden
- County: Östergötland County
- Municipality: Norrköping Municipality

Area
  - Total: 0.32 km^{2} (0.12 sq mi)

Population (31 December 2010)
  - Total: 246
  - Density: 772/km^{2} (2,000/sq mi)
- Time zone: UTC+1 (CET)
  - Summer (DST): UTC+2 (CEST)

Skriketorp is a locality situated in Norrköping Municipality, Östergötland County, Sweden with 246 inhabitants in 2010.
