= Gunnar's bridge runestones =

There were probably two Gunnar's bridge runestones at Kullerstad, which is about one kilometre northeast of Skärblacka, Östergötland County, Sweden, which is in the historic province of Östergötland, where a man named Håkon dedicated a bridge to the memory of his son Gunnar. The second stone was discovered in a church only 500 metres away and is raised in the cemetery. The second stone informs that Håkon raised more than one stone in memory of his son and that the son died vestr or "in the West."

== Ög 162 ==
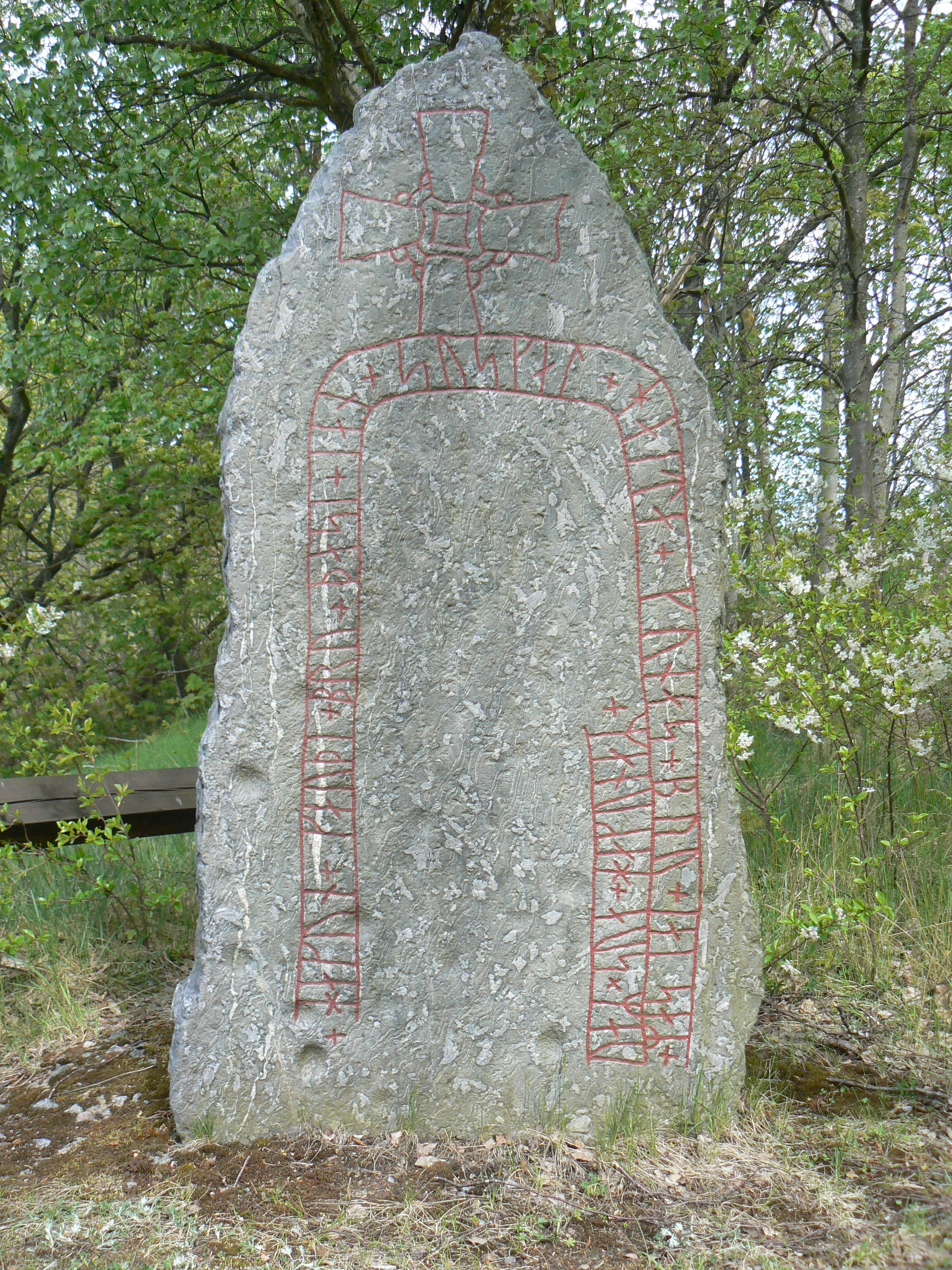
Ög 162.

The inscription on this stone, which is 1.6 metres in height, consists of a Christian cross above an arching runic text band and a second partial interior band. The design of the inscription is similar to that of Ög Fv1970;310, and it is believed that they originally formed a coupled monument and were carved by the same runemaster. The runic text on both stones indicates that Hákon constructed a bridge as a memorial to his son Gunnarr, who died vestr or "in the West." Although the messages of most runestones are formulaic, some of them convey the sadness of those who raised them in memory of lost family members, like this runestone.

+ hakun + karþi + bru + þasi + ian + su skal + haita + kunas + bru + iai saʀ + uaʀ × sua + hakunaʀ +
{} Hakon {} gærði {} bro {} þessi, {} en {} su skal {} hæita {} Gunnars {} bro, {} en saʀ {} vaʀ {} sunn {} Hakonaʀ. {}
Hákon made this bridge and it will be called Gunnarr's bridge. And he was Hákon's son.

== Ög Fv1970;310 ==
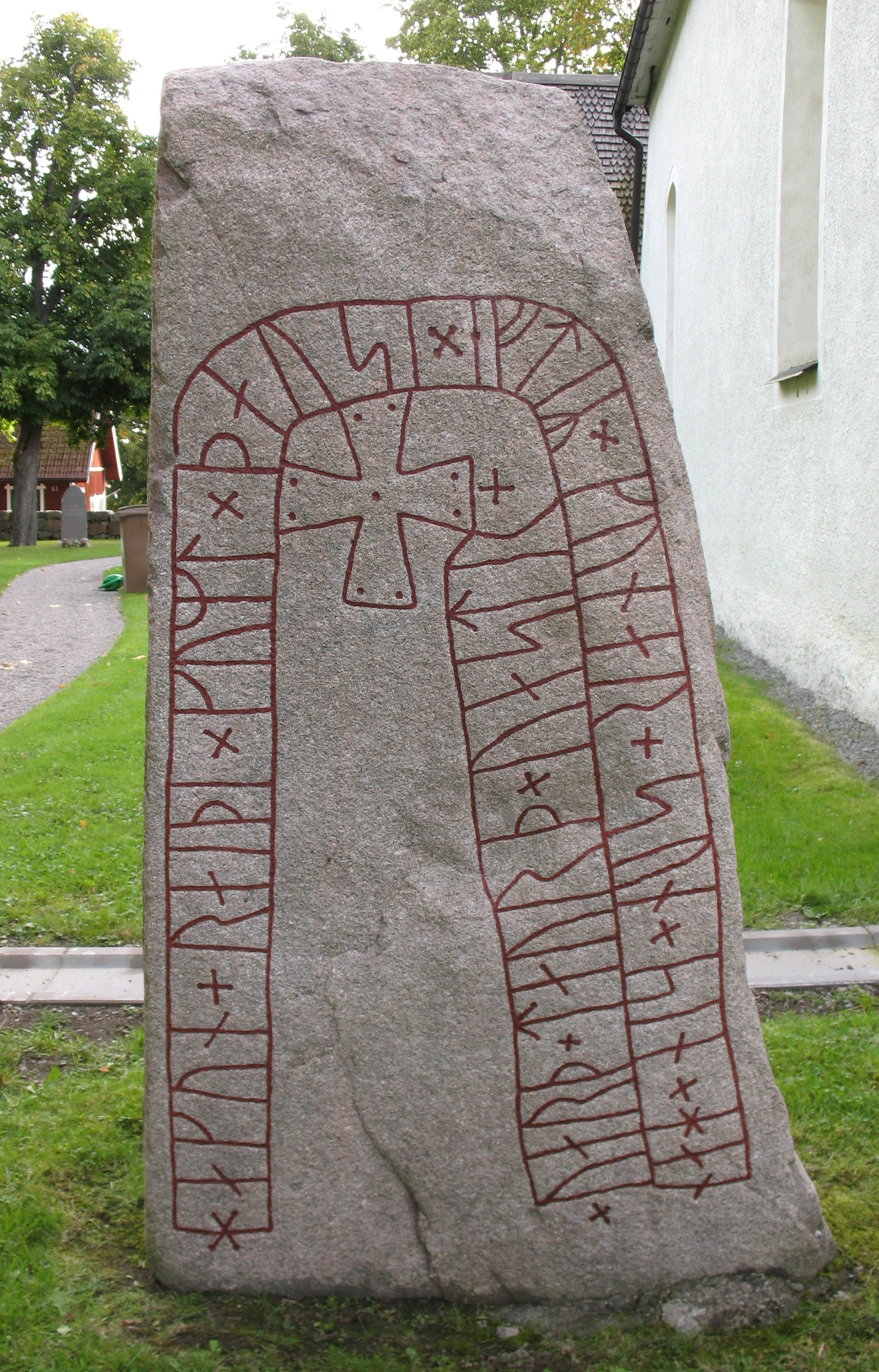
Ög Fv1970;310.

This runestone was found in the exterior wall of the church of Kullerstad in 1969 and is raised in the cemetery. It informs that Håkon raised more than one memorial for his son and that he died in the West. This runestone is discussed in further detail in the article Viking runestones under Ög Fv1970;310.

hakun + raiþi × kuml × þausi × eftiʀ × kunar + sun × sin × han × uarþ × taurþ × uastr +
Hakon {} ræisþi {} kumbl {} þausi {} æftiʀ {} Gunnar, {} sun {} sinn. {} Hann {} varð {} dauðr {} vestr. {}
Hákon raised these monuments in memory of Gunnarr, his son. He died in the west.

== Gallery ==
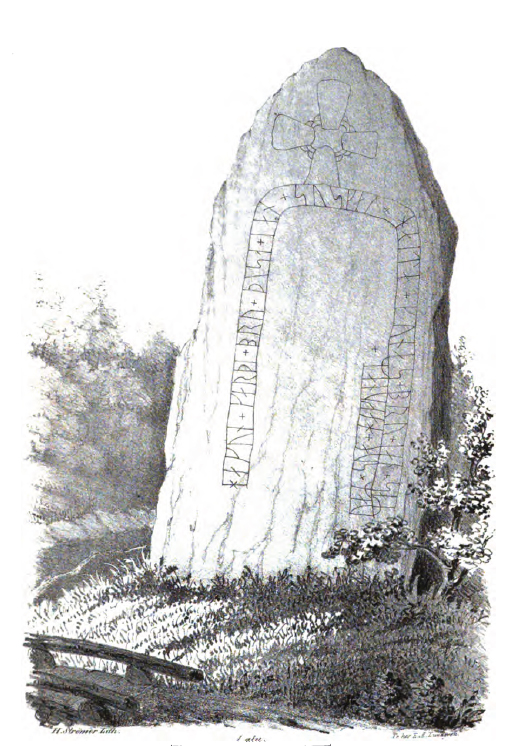
Drawing of Ög 162 published in 1857.

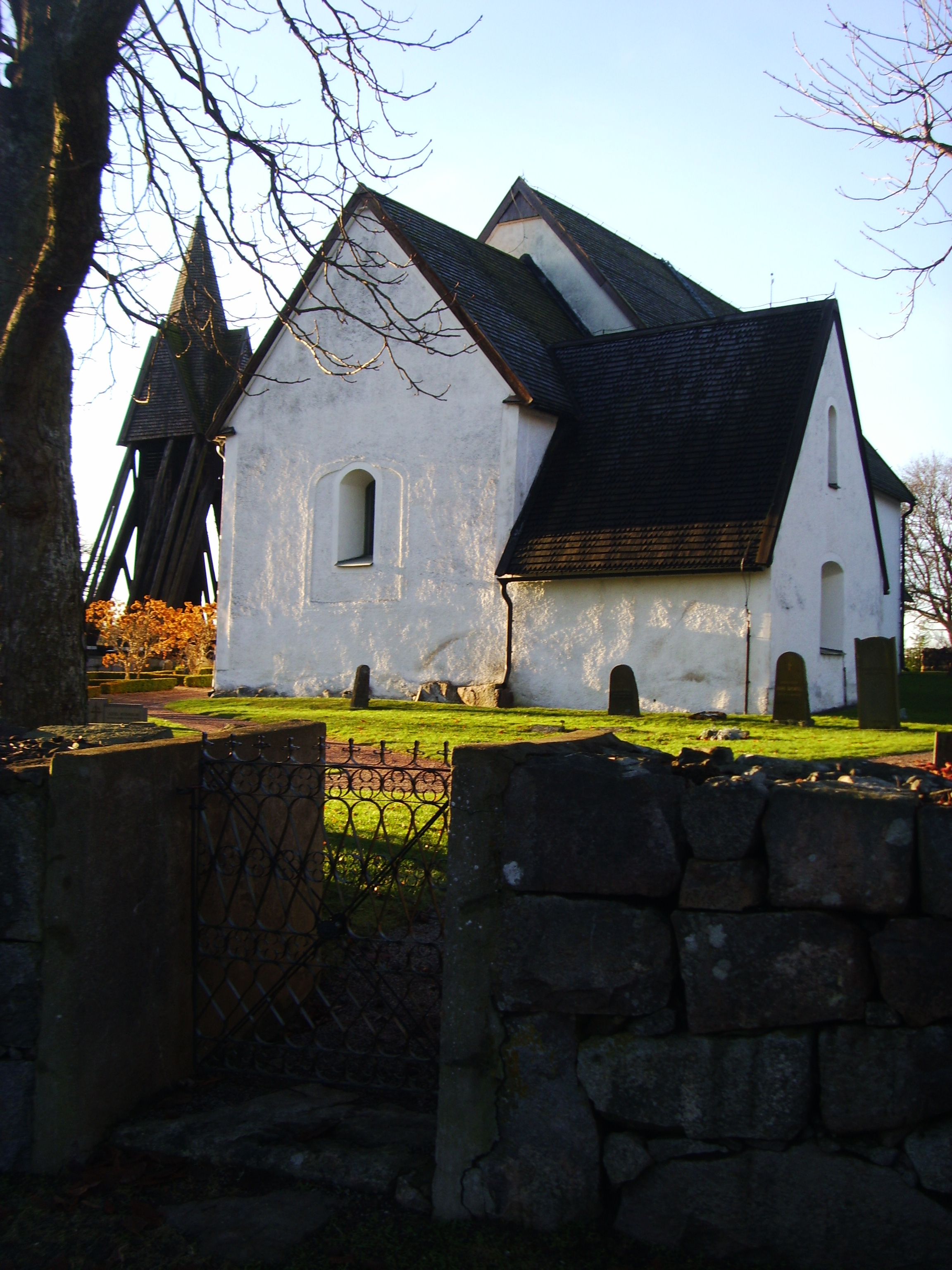
The church at Kullerstad in 2008.

== Sources ==
- Larsson, Mats G. (2002). Götarnas Riken : Upptäcktsfärder Till Sveriges Enande. Bokförlaget Atlantis AB ISBN 978-91-7486-641-4
- Peterson, Lena; Elmevik, Lennart; Williams, Henrik, eds. (2008-12-03). Scandinavian Runic-text Database (2008 ed.). Department of Scandinavian Languages, Uppsala University.
- Svärdström, Elisabeth (1970). "Runfynd 1969" (PDF). Fornvännen. 65. Swedish National Heritage Board: 301–313. ISSN 1404-9430.
- Kulturarv Östergötland, a site maintained by the County Museum of Östergötland.
