= Ensjön =

- Location within Östergötland Location within Sweden
- Coordinates: 58°33′N 16°12′E
- Country: Sweden
- Province: Östergötland
- County: Östergötland County
- Municipality: Norrköping Municipality

Area
  - Total: 0.23 km^{2} (0.089 sq mi)

Population (31 December 2010)
  - Total: 333
  - Density: 1,458/km^{2} (3,780/sq mi)
- Time zone: UTC+1 (CET)
  - Summer (DST): UTC+2 (CEST)

Ensjön is a locality situated in Norrköping Municipality, Östergötland County, Sweden with 333 inhabitants in 2010.
