= SJ F (steam locomotive) =

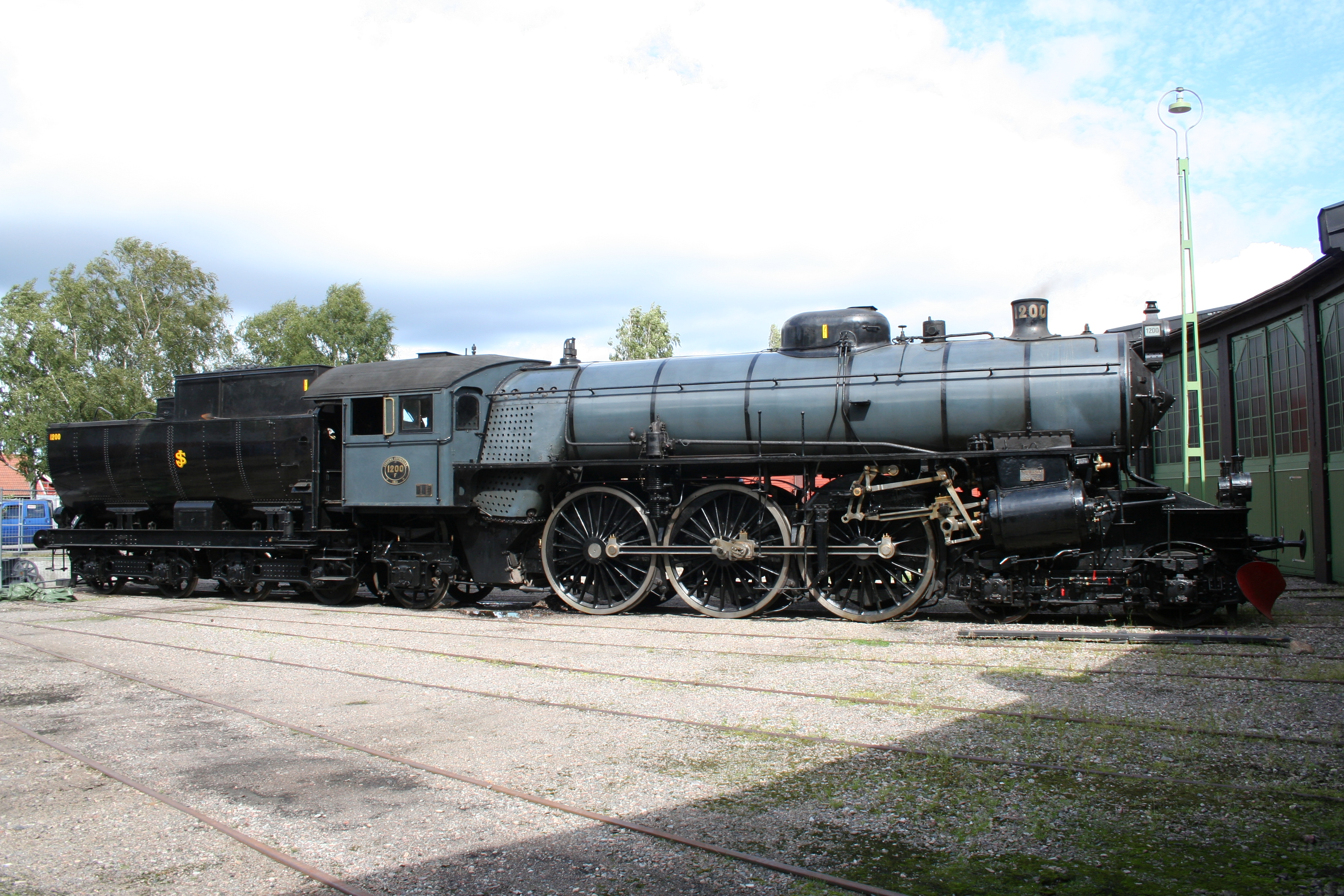
- SJ 1200 at Gävle, August 2008
Type and origin
- Power type: Steam
- Builder: NOHAB
- Serial number: 1020, 1061-1070
- Build date: 1914–1916
Specifications
- Configuration
  - Whyte: 4-6-2
  - UIC: 2′C1′ h4v
- Gauge: 1,435 mm (4 ft 8 1/2 in)
- Driver dia.: 1,880 mm (6 ft 2 in)
- Length: 21,300 mm (69 ft 11 in)
- Loco weight: 142.8 tonnes (140.5 long tons; 157.4 short tons)
- Cylinders: Four, compound
Performance figures
- Maximum speed: 90 km/h (56 mph) (110 km/h or 68 mph in Danish service)
- Power output: 1,140 kW (1,529 hp)
Career
- Operators: Statens Järnvägar, Danske Statsbaner
- Number in class: 11
- Disposition: retired

The F class was a type of steam locomotive used by Swedish State Railways (Swedish: Statens Järnvägar, SJ) and based on the Württemberg C. Eleven locos were built by Nydquist & Holm (NOHAB) between 1914 and 1916. It was primarily used on the main lines between Stockholm-Gothenburg and Stockholm-Malmö. It is one of the largest steam locomotives ever used in Sweden.

The superheated compound locomotive could produce 1,140 kilowatts (1,529 hp).

== Denmark ==
During the 1930s the locomotives became obsolete due to electrification of the main lines, and in 1937 were sold to DSB of Denmark, where they served as DSB Class E DSB was so impressed with the performance of the E class that starting 1942, a further 25 locos were built by Frichs of Aarhus. The E class remained in service into the early 1970s. On the death of king Frederik IX the funeral train from Copenhagen to Roskilde on 14 January 1972 was double-headed by two class Es.

== Preservation ==
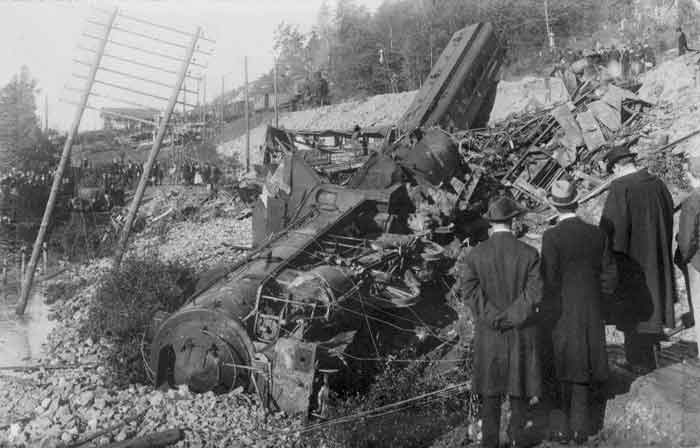
The F 1200 after derailing in 1918.

Two of the Swedish-built locomotives are preserved and F 1200 is in running condition. Both are owned by the Swedish Railway Museum. Several Frichs-built locomotives are preserved in Denmark, and E 996 at Railworld in Peterborough. F 1200 was involved in a serious accident outside Getå in October 1918.
