= Simonstorp =

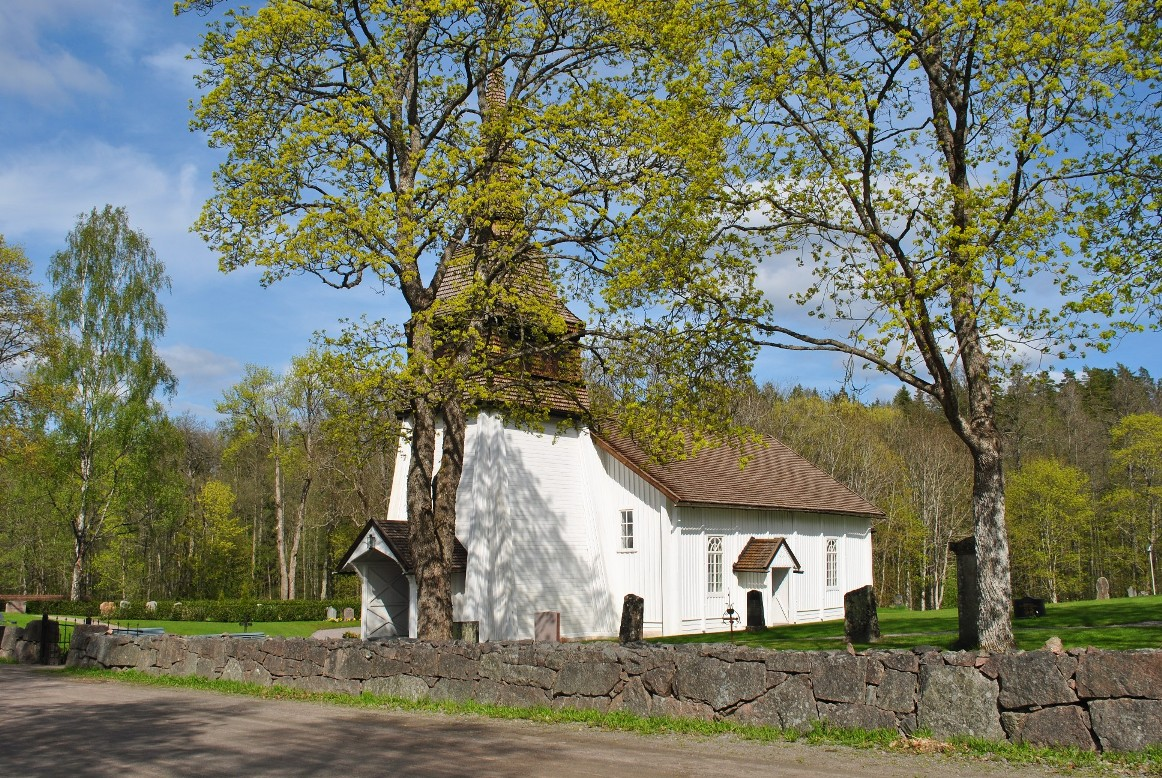

- Location within Östergötland Location within Sweden
- Coordinates: 58°47′N 16°09′E
- Country: Sweden
- Province: Östergötland
- County: Östergötland County
- Municipality: Norrköping Municipality

Area
  - Total: 0.51 km^{2} (0.20 sq mi)

Population (31 December 2010)
  - Total: 258
  - Density: 505/km^{2} (1,310/sq mi)
- Time zone: UTC+1 (CET)
  - Summer (DST): UTC+2 (CEST)

Simonstorp is a locality situated in Norrköping Municipality, Östergötland County, Sweden with 258 inhabitants in 2010.
