= Skärblacka =

- Location within Östergötland Location within Sweden
- Coordinates: 58°34′N 15°54′E
- Country: Sweden
- Province: Östergötland
- County: Östergötland County
- Municipality: Norrköping Municipality

Area
  - Total: 3.89 km^{2} (1.50 sq mi)

Population (31 December 2010)
  - Total: 4,059
  - Density: 1,043/km^{2} (2,700/sq mi)
- Time zone: UTC+1 (CET)
  - Summer (DST): UTC+2 (CEST)

Skärblacka is a locality situated in Norrköping Municipality, Östergötland County, Sweden with 4,059 inhabitants in 2010. In everyday use, the town is known as simply Blacka.

Until 1971, the town was the administrative centre of Skärblacka municipality, and had a relatively well built-up centre, with an ice rink, swimming pool and secondary school.

== Riksdag elections ==
Skärblacka used to be a strongly left-wing area with an industrial heritage. Throughout the early 21st century, however, the vote share for the Social Democrats fell substantially, which saw the right-leaning parties gain more votes than the leftist ones in 2018 after the village had a 40-point left-wing cushion just 16 years prior. Unlike many other industrial villages in the greater region surrounding Skärblacka, the voting population has remained at steady levels ever since it entered Norrköping Municipality in the early 1970s. Between 1973 and 2018 Skärblacka went from being 46 points more left-wing than the national average to leaning slightly right of said average.

Year	%	Votes	V	S	MP	C	L	KD	M	SD	NyD	Left	Right
1973	91.7	2,600	4.0	67.8		16.3	4.2	2.2	5.4			71.8	25.9
1976	93.5	2,852	2.8	66.0		16.2	5.8	1.8	7.4			68.8	29.3
1979	92.1	2,897	3.9	64.7		11.8	7.8	2.3	11.5			68.6	30.1
1982	91.8	2,911	4.2	65.0	1.1	10.1	3.6	2.6	13.3			69.2	27.1
1985	91.2	2,899	3.7	63.6	0.8	9.7	9.5		12.6			67.3	31.8
1988	87.8	2,736	4.5	61.4	4.1	7.8	8.0	3.1	10.8			70.1	26.6
1991	87.1	2,658	4.3	55.1	2.4	5.0	5.0	6.6	13.4		7.0	59.4	30.0
1994	87.7	2,822	6.4	60.9	3.6	4.4	4.2	4.0	13.8		1.2	70.9	26.3
1998	80.8	2,475	11.2	53.4	3.5	2.9	1.9	9.2	15.2			68.2	29.3
2002	80.5	2,429	6.9	58.6	2.9	3.7	8.7	7.5	9.7	1.3		68.5	29.7
2006	83.0	2,461	5.8	52.4	3.1	4.7	4.2	5.9	16.5	3.1		61.3	31.2
2010	87.2	2,534	5.1	43.3	4.4	4.1	5.2	4.4	25.3	6.7		52.7	39.0
2014	87.0	2,589	3.4	40.6	3.6	4.4	2.5	4.1	17.7	21.7		47.6	28.7
2018	87.3	2,589	5.9	35.1	2.5	5.1	3.1	5.6	16.1	25.4		48.7	50.2

== Communication ==
Skärblacka has a train and bus station on the Kimstad – Finspång line, Norrköping, Finspång and Linköping.

== Industry ==
The main employers are the paper factory, part of BillerudKorsnäs. They mostly produce paper for bags, sacks and wallpaper. The factory was opened in 1872, but today's industry was built up in the 1960s. Many of the town's inhabitants commute to Norrköping and Finspång.

== Sports ==
The following sports clubs are located in Skärblacka:

- Skärblacka IF
