= Svärtinge =

- Location within Östergötland Location within Sweden
- Coordinates: 58°39′N 16°00′E
- Country: Sweden
- Province: Östergötland
- County: Östergötland County
- Municipality: Norrköping Municipality

Area
  - Total: 3.86 km^{2} (1.49 sq mi)

Population (31 December 2010)
  - Total: 2,963
  - Density: 768/km^{2} (1,990/sq mi)
- Time zone: UTC+1 (CET)
  - Summer (DST): UTC+2 (CEST)

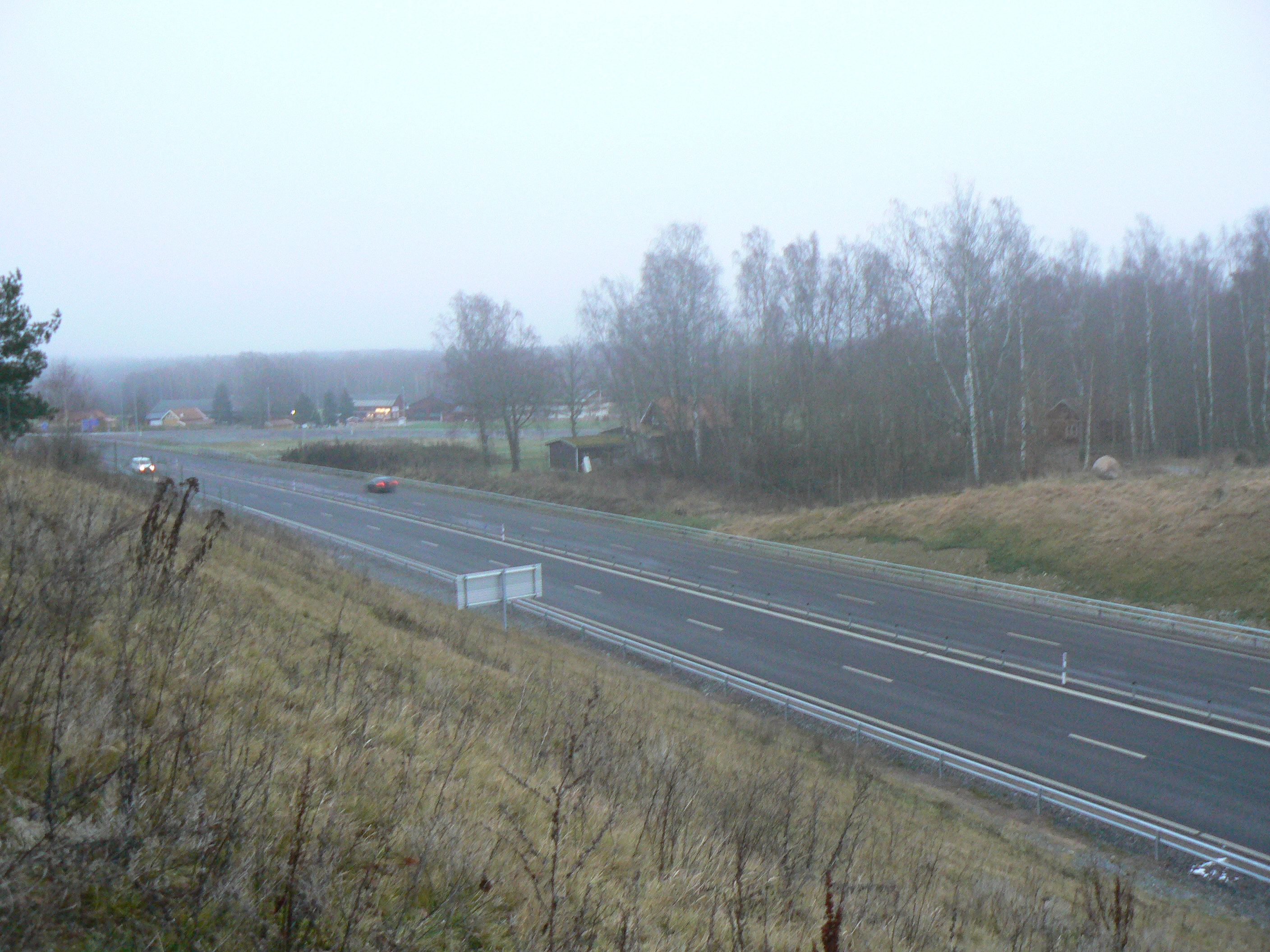
Swedish National road 51 at Svärtinge

Svärtinge is a locality situated in Norrköping Municipality, Östergötland County, Sweden with 2,963 inhabitants in 2010.

== Sports ==
The following sports clubs are located in Svärtinge:

- Svärtinge SK
