= Åselstad =

- Location within Östergötland Location within Sweden
- Coordinates: 58°33′N 16°13′E
- Country: Sweden
- Province: Östergötland
- County: Östergötland County
- Municipality: Norrköping Municipality

Area
  - Total: 0.50 km^{2} (0.19 sq mi)

Population (31 December 2010)
  - Total: 475
  - Density: 946/km^{2} (2,450/sq mi)
- Time zone: UTC+1 (CET)
  - Summer (DST): UTC+2 (CEST)

Åselstad is a locality situated in Norrköping Municipality, Östergötland County, Sweden with 475 inhabitants in 2010.
