= Herstadberg =

- Location within Östergötland Location within Sweden
- Coordinates: 58°38′N 16°10′E
- Country: Sweden
- Province: Östergötland
- County: Östergötland County
- Municipality: Norrköping Municipality

Area
  - Total: 0.36 km^{2} (0.14 sq mi)

Population (31 December 2010)
  - Total: 236
  - Density: 661/km^{2} (1,710/sq mi)
- Time zone: UTC+1 (CET)
  - Summer (DST): UTC+2 (CEST)

Herstadberg is a locality situated in Norrköping Municipality, Östergötland County, Sweden with 236 inhabitants in 2010.
