= Skärblacka IF =

Swedish football club

- Full name: Skärblacka IF Idrottsförening
- Founded: 1910
- Ground: Skärblacka IP; Skärblacka; Sweden
- League: Division 5 Östergötland Mellersta
| Home colours | Away colours |

Skärblacka IF is a Swedish football club located in Skärblacka.

== Background ==
Skärblacka IF is mainly known for playing in the Division 2, at the time the second tier in Swedish football, from 1935 to 1940.

The men's team currently plays in Division 5 Östergötland Mellersta which is the sixth tier of Swedish football. They play their home matches at the Skärblacka IP in Skärblacka.

The club is affiliated to Östergötlands Fotbollförbund. Skärblacka IF played in the 2010 Svenska Cupen but lost 0–3 at home to Nyköpings BIS in the preliminary round.

== Season to season ==
| Season | Level | Division | Section | Position | Movements |
|---|---|---|---|---|---|
| 2006* | Tier 7 | Division 5 | Östergötland Mellersta | 3rd | |
| 2007 | Tier 7 | Division 5 | Östergötland Mellersta | 9th | |
| 2008 | Tier 7 | Division 5 | Östergötland Östra | 11th | Relegated |
| 2009 | Tier 8 | Division 6 | Östergötland Östra | 1st | Promoted |
| 2010 | Tier 7 | Division 5 | Östergötland Mellersta | 7th | |
| 2011 | Tier 7 | Division 5 | Östergötland Mellersta | 6th | |

* League restructuring in 2006 resulted in a new division being created at Tier 3 and subsequent divisions dropping a level.
