= Graversfors =

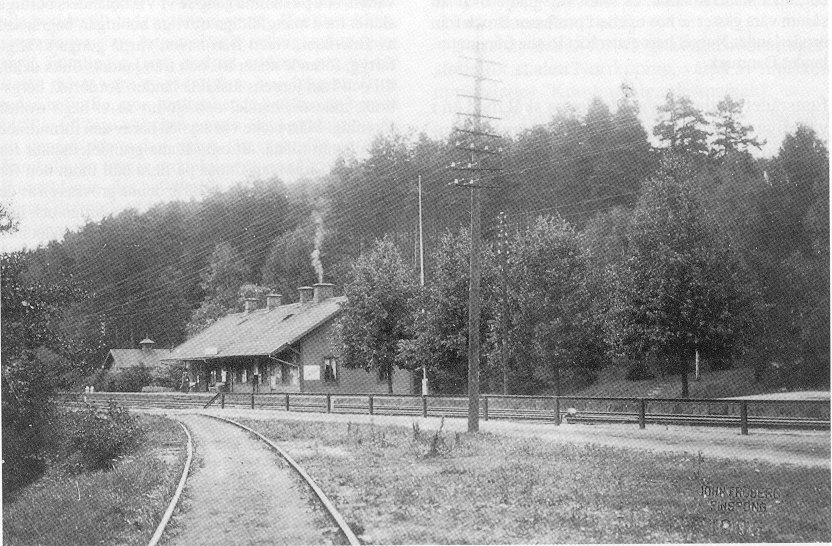
- Graversfors old railway station (removed in 1968)

- Location within Östergötland Location within Sweden
- Coordinates: 58°41′30″N 16°09′00″E
- Country: Sweden
- Province: Östergötland
- County: Östergötland County
- Municipality: Norrköping Municipality

Area
  - Total: 0.64 km^{2} (0.25 sq mi)

Population (31 December 2010)
  - Total: 246
  - Density: 383/km^{2} (990/sq mi)
- Time zone: UTC+1 (CET)
  - Summer (DST): UTC+2 (CEST)

Graversfors is a locality situated in Norrköping Municipality, Östergötland County, Sweden with 246 inhabitants in 2010.
