= Nävsjön =

Lake in Norrköping Municipality, Sweden

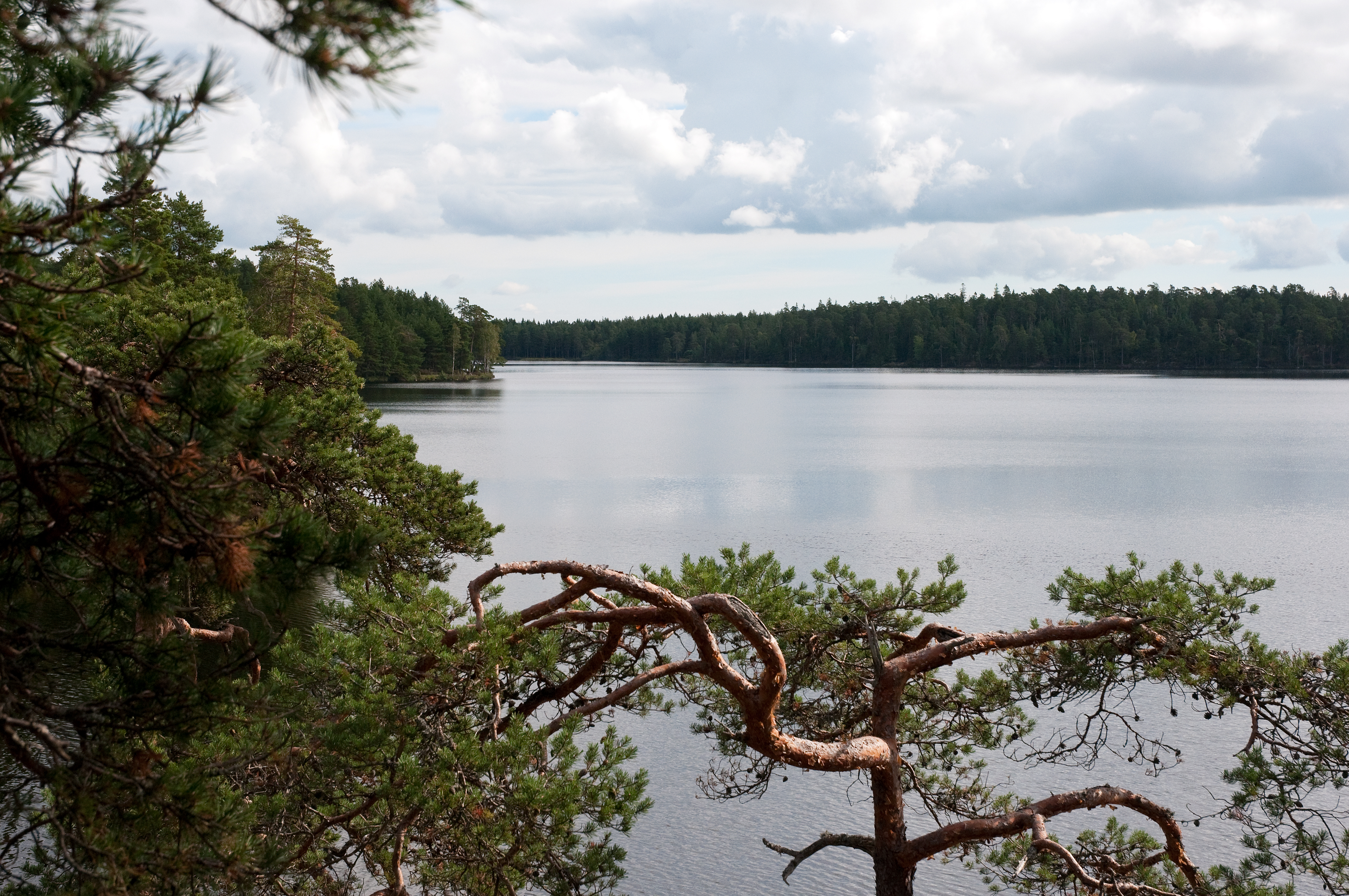
- Nävsjön from a viewpoint in Nyköping municipality

- Location within Södermanland
- Coordinates: 58°39′27″N 16°42′43″E
- Basin countries: Sweden

Nävsjön is a lake in Sweden. It straddles the boundary between Norrköping Municipality in Östergötland County and Nyköping Municipality in Södermanland County.
