= Vånga =

- Location within Östergötland Location within Sweden
- Coordinates: 58°35′N 15°48′E
- Country: Sweden
- Province: Östergötland
- County: Östergötland County
- Municipality: Norrköping Municipality

Area
  - Total: 0.31 km^{2} (0.12 sq mi)

Population (31 December 2010)
  - Total: 220
  - Density: 709/km^{2} (1,840/sq mi)
- Time zone: UTC+1 (CET)
  - Summer (DST): UTC+2 (CEST)

Vånga is a locality situated in Norrköping Municipality, Östergötland County, Sweden with 220 inhabitants in 2010. Vånga lies north of Lake Roxen.
