= Württemberg C =

Württemberg Class C DRG Class 18.1
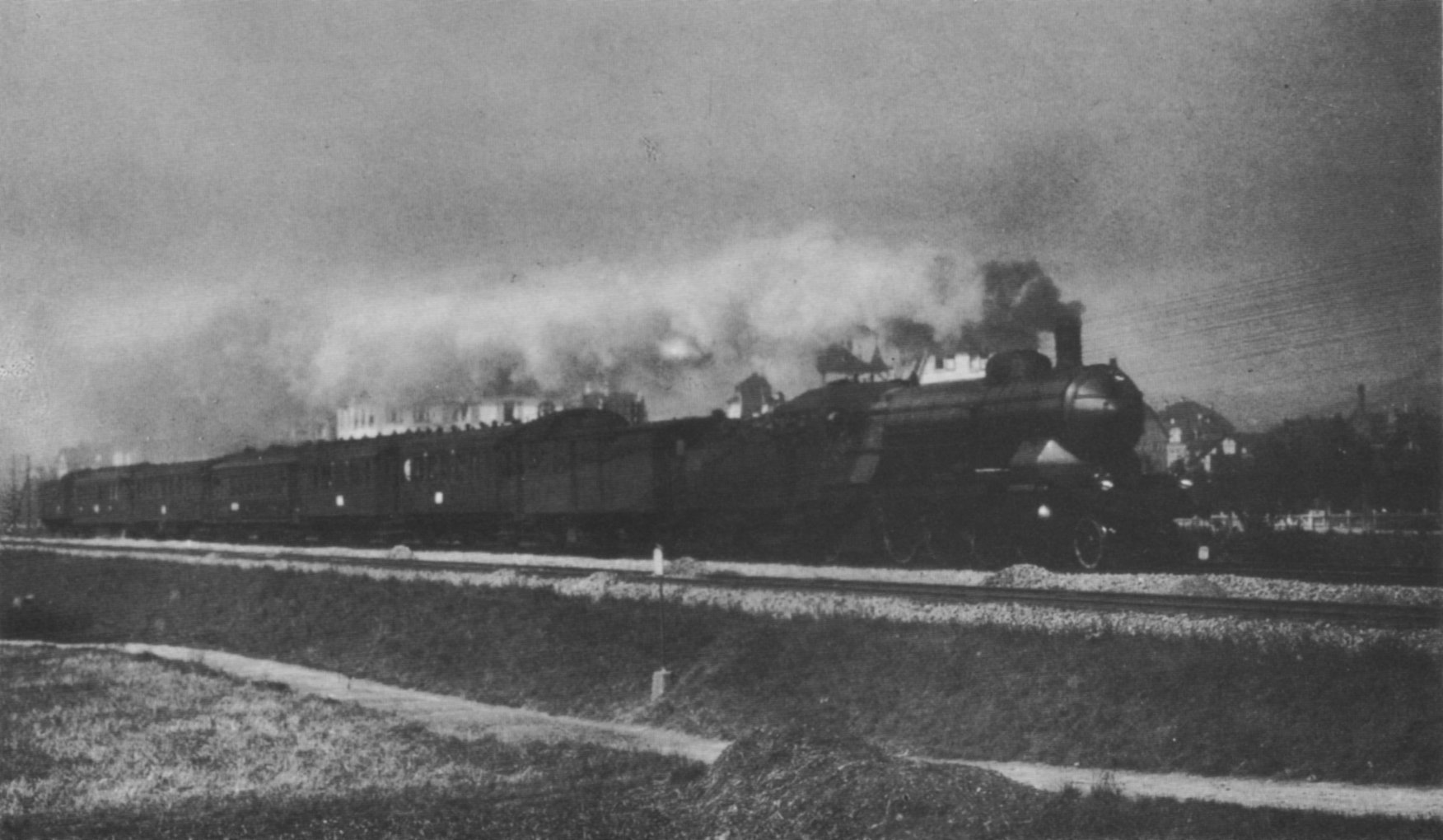
- Hauling the Orient Express
Type and origin
- Builder: Esslingen
- Build date: 1909–1921
- Total produced: 41
Specifications
- Configuration
  - Whyte: 4-6-2
- Gauge: 1,435 mm (4 ft 8 1/2 in)
- Leading dia.: 1,000 mm (3 ft 3 1/4 in)
- Driver dia.: 1,800 mm (5 ft 10 3/4 in)
- Trailing dia.: 1,250 mm (4 ft 1 1/4 in)
- Length
  - Over beams: 21,855 mm (71 ft 8 1/2 in)
- Axle load: 15.9 tonnes (15.6 long tons; 17.5 short tons)
- Adhesive weight: 47.7 tonnes (46.9 long tons; 52.6 short tons)
- Service weight: 85.2 tonnes (83.9 long tons; 93.9 short tons)
- Water cap.: 20.0 or 30.0 m^{3} (4,400 or 6,600 imp gal; 5,300 or 7,900 US gal)
- Boiler pressure: 15 kg/cm^{2} (1.47 MPa; 213 psi)
- Heating surface
  - Firebox: 3.96 m^{2} (42.6 sq ft)
  - Evaporative: 205.14 m^{2} (2,208.1 sq ft)
- Superheater
  - Heating area: 54.43 m^{2} (585.9 sq ft)
- High-pressure cylinder: 420 mm (16 9/16 in)
- Low-pressure cylinder: 620 mm (24 7/16 in)
- Piston stroke: 612 mm (24 1/8 in)
Performance figures
- Maximum speed: 115–120 km/h (71–75 mph)
- Indicated power: 1,840 PS (1,350 kW; 1,810 hp)
Career
- Numbers: K.W.St.E.: 2001–2041; DRG: 18 101–137
- Retired: 1955

The steam locomotives of the Württemberg Class C were built for the Royal Württemberg State Railways in the early 20th century and were Pacifics designed for hauling express trains. They were the smallest state railway Länderbahn locomotives with a 4-6-2 wheel arrangement.

== History ==
The 41 C class locomotives were built between 1909 and 1921 by Maschinenfabrik Esslingen. They were designed from the outset for the steep gradients in Württemberg and therefore had smaller driving wheels with only a 1,800 mm diameter. Despite being the smallest engines with a Pacific configuration, they were economical, yet at the same time very powerful. In all, 41 units of this class were manufactured.

The appearance of the locomotives was relatively unusual at the time. Striking features included the outside subframe and the streamlined shape of the driver's cab and smokebox, resembling that of the Bavarian S 2/6 4-4-4 express locomotive and the later S 3/6 Pacifics. The locomotives were also known as "the beautiful Württemberg lass" (die schöne Württembergerin) due to this unique form.

After the First World War, three engines were given to France where they became the État class 231 and one to Poland where it became the sole example of the Om101 class. The remaining 37 were taken over by the Deutsche Reichsbahn as DRG Class 18.1, where they were given the running numbers 18 101–137. They were even taken over by the Deutsche Bundesbahn, but retired by 1955. The last two examples were numbers 18 133 and 18 136, which were stabled in Ulm during their final years.

The locomotives were equipped with wü 2'2' T 20 and wü 2'2' T30 tenders.

== France ==
The three locomotives surrendered to France, 2001, 2026 and 2027, were allocated to the Chemins de Fer de l'État, where they were numbered 231–997 to 231–999. They were used until 1937, when they were placed into store for use as steam generators. The SNCF allocated them the numbers 3–231.A.997 to 999, but the locomotives never carried these numbers. The three locomotives were destroyed in an air raid on 13 May 1944 and subsequently scrapped.

== Models ==
The German model railway manufacturer Märklin has produced models of the Wuttemburg C class as part of its HO and Z scale range in K.W.St.E green or grey as the C class, and in black as the DRG or DB 18.1 class. Roco has produced a model of the C class in HO scale with part number 43216.

== See also ==
- SJ F
- Royal Württemberg State Railways
- List of Württemberg locomotives and railbuses
