= Kimstad =

- Location within Östergötland Location within Sweden
- Coordinates: 58°32′N 15°58′E
- Country: Sweden
- Province: Östergötland
- County: Östergötland County
- Municipality: Norrköping Municipality

Area
  - Total: 1.44 km^{2} (0.56 sq mi)

Population (31 December 2010)
  - Total: 1,510
  - Density: 1,050/km^{2} (2,700/sq mi)
- Time zone: UTC+1 (CET)
  - Summer (DST): UTC+2 (CEST)

Kimstad is a locality situated in Norrköping Municipality, Östergötland County, Sweden with 1,510 inhabitants in 2010. On 12 September 2010, Kimstad became the scene of a railway accident when an X 2000 high-speed train collided with a crane utility vehicle. Kimstad lies around 20 kilometres southwest of Norrköping.

== Riksdag elections ==
| Year | % | Votes | V | S | MP | C | L | KD | M | SD | NyD | Left | Right |
|---|---|---|---|---|---|---|---|---|---|---|---|---|---|
| 1973 | 92.2 | 1,356 | 2.7 | 48.2 | | 26.5 | 9.1 | 1.3 | 12.0 | | | 50.8 | 47.6 |
| 1976 | 94.2 | 1,484 | 2.6 | 45.4 | | 27.5 | 10.6 | 1.1 | 12.6 | | | 48.0 | 50.7 |
| 1979 | 92.1 | 1,574 | 3.4 | 45.0 | | 21.4 | 11.4 | 1.1 | 17.3 | | | 48.4 | 50.1 |
| 1982 | 94.0 | 1,570 | 3.4 | 48.2 | 1.3 | 18.3 | 6.0 | 1.4 | 21.4 | | | 51.6 | 45.7 |
| 1985 | 94.5 | 1,673 | 3.8 | 47.1 | 1.3 | 14.0 | 11.9 | | 21.5 | | | 50.9 | 47.4 |
| 1988 | 89.7 | 1,589 | 5.2 | 46.9 | 4.2 | 12.0 | 11.5 | 1.7 | 18.4 | | | 56.2 | 41.9 |
| 1991 | 89.6 | 1,567 | 4.5 | 37.8 | 2.9 | 8.5 | 7.5 | 7.2 | 21.1 | | 8.0 | 42.3 | 44.3 |
| 1994 | 89.6 | 1,630 | 6.5 | 46.4 | 5.2 | 8.1 | 5.5 | 3.1 | 20.5 | | 2.3 | 58.1 | 37.1 |
| 1998 | 84.7 | 1,474 | 12.6 | 37.4 | 5.4 | 6.8 | 3.0 | 9.4 | 21.8 | | | 55.4 | 40.9 |
| 2002 | 84.7 | 1,450 | 7.1 | 44.3 | 3.3 | 7.2 | 9.4 | 9.4 | 15.8 | 2.1 | | 54.7 | 41.9 |
| 2006 | 86.3 | 1,549 | 4.8 | 37.2 | 4.3 | 9.0 | 6.3 | 5.1 | 25.3 | 3.9 | | 46.4 | 45.7 |
| 2010 | 88.8 | 1,181 | 4.2 | 36.9 | 4.2 | 5.8 | 5.6 | 4.3 | 28.8 | 9.1 | | 45.4 | 44.5 |
| 2014 | 90.6 | 1,219 | 4.0 | 33.6 | 4.2 | 5.6 | 4.3 | 3.4 | 21.0 | 21.2 | | 41.8 | 34.3 |
| 2018 | 88.8 | 1,206 | 6.4 | 26.5 | 2.8 | 7.3 | 5.1 | 6.7 | 18.9 | 25.3 | | 43.0 | 56.1 |
