= Åby IF =

Swedish football club

- Full name: Åby Idrottsförening
- Ground: Åby IP; Åby; Sweden
- Chairman: Peter Ekvall
- League: Division 4 Östergötland Östra
Home colours	Away colours

Åby IF is a Swedish football club located in Åby.

== Background ==
Åby IF currently plays in Division 4 Östergötland Östra which is the sixth tier of Swedish football. They play their home matches at the Åby IP in Åby.

The club is affiliated to Östergötlands Fotbollförbund.

== Season to season ==
In their most successful period Åby IF competed in the following divisions:

Season	Level	Division	Section	Position	Movements
1953–54	Tier 4	Division 4	Östergötland Östra		Promoted
1954–55	Tier 3	Division 3	Östra Götaland	8th	
1955–56	Tier 3	Division 3	Nordöstra Götaland	10th	
1956–57	Tier 4	Division 4	Östergötland Östra	4th	
1957–58	Tier 4	Division 4	Östergötland Östra	7th	
1959	Tier 4	Division 4	Östergötland Östra	9th	Relegated

In recent seasons Åby IF have competed in the following divisions:

Season	Level	Division	Section	Position	Movements
1999	Tier 5	Division 4	Östergötland Östra	9th	
2000	Tier 5	Division 4	Östergötland Östra	11th	Relegated
2001	Tier 6	Division 5	Östergötland Östra	4th	
2002	Tier 6	Division 5	Östergötland Östra	2nd	Promoted
2003	Tier 5	Division 4	Östergötland Östra	1th	
2004	Tier 5	Division 4	Östergötland Östra	9th	
2005	Tier 5	Division 4	Östergötland Östra	10th	
2006*	Tier 6	Division 4	Östergötland Östra	5th	
2007	Tier 6	Division 4	Östergötland Östra	9th	
2008	Tier 6	Division 4	Östergötland Östra	5th	
2009	Tier 6	Division 4	Östergötland Östra	10th	
2010	Tier 6	Division 4	Östergötland Östra	4th	
2011	Tier 6	Division 4	Östergötland Östra		

* League restructuring in 2006 resulted in a new division being created at Tier 3 and subsequent divisions dropping a level.
