= Åby, Norrköping Municipality =

Åby
- Location within Östergötland Location within Sweden
- Coordinates: 58°40′N 16°11′E
- Country: Sweden
- Province: Östergötland
- County: Östergötland County
- Municipality: Norrköping Municipality

Area
  - Total: 3.32 km^{2} (1.28 sq mi)

Population (31 December 2010)
  - Total: 4,980
  - Density: 1,502/km^{2} (3,890/sq mi)
- Time zone: UTC+1 (CET)
  - Summer (DST): UTC+2 (CEST)

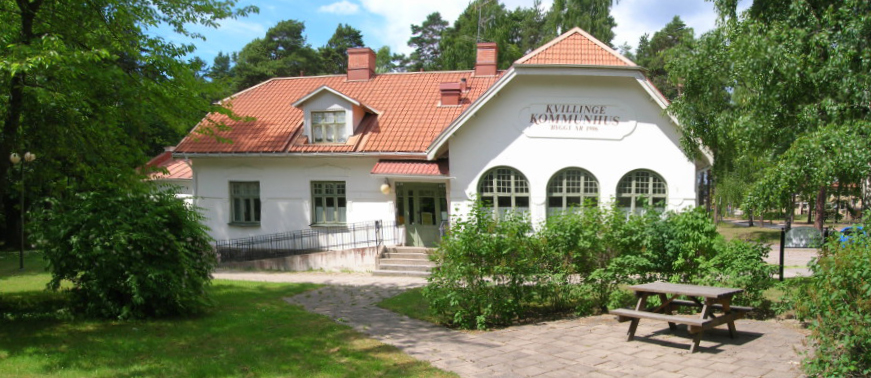
Kvillinge former municipal hall, built in 1906, Åby, Norrköping municipality, Sweden.

Åby is a locality situated in Norrköping Municipality, Östergötland County, Sweden with 4,980 inhabitants in 2010.

The locality's name means "village on a river" (Old Norse á, river, and býr, village) and is identical in meaning with Aby in Lincolnshire, England.

== Sports ==
The following sports clubs are located in Åby:

- Åby IF
- Åby Oilers
- Hultic BK
