= History of rail transport in Sweden =

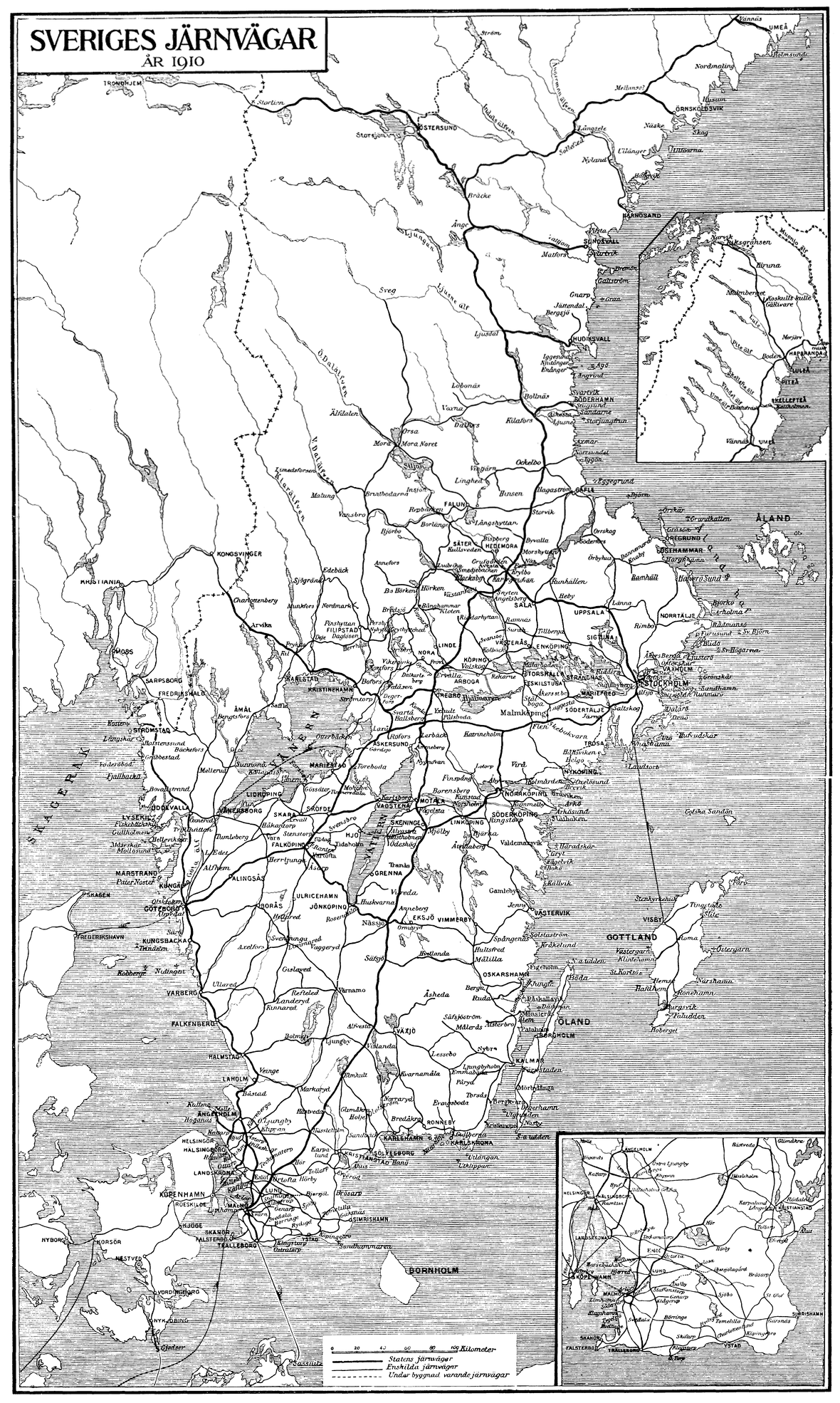
Railways in Sweden, 1910

The history of Sweden's railways has included both state-owned and private railways.

== Private railways ==
=== The early years 1845–1914 ===
In 1845 the Swedish count Adolf Eugene von Rosen received permission to build railways in Sweden. He started building a railway between the town of Köping and Hult (a small port at Lake Vänern). Köping–Hult railway was intended to connect to steamboats on the lakes Mälaren and Vänern, giving a motorised connection between Gothenburg and Stockholm. Von Rosen's money came from British investors. His money ran out in the 1850s and in 1854 the parliament of Sweden decided that the Swedish trunk lines (stambanorna) should be built and operated by the state.

The first completed public railway in Sweden was the Frykstadbanan, between Frykstad and Klara Älvs, in the province of Värmland. It had a track gauge of 1,188 mm and used horses for haulage. It was converted to steam operation in 1855.

The first railway in Sweden to use steam locomotives from the outset was Nora–Ervalla–Örebro railway in Närke, part of Köping–Hult railway, which opened 5 March 1856, built on standard gauge.

The railway "Bergslagsbanan" Gothenburg–Falun–Gävle, was the longest privately built railway, 478 km (297 mi), opened 1879. Many private railway companies built narrow-gauge railways, like the network of Stockholm–Roslagens Järnvägar between Stockholm and Uppsala and Falkenberg railway in Halland, which both used the Swedish three-foot–gauge common to Sweden but not used in the rest of the world. Many private railways were primarily owned by cities, making the rail only semi-private, and semi-municipal.

== State owned railways ==
=== The building of the main lines 1855–1891 ===
Sweden started building railways later than many other European countries. Sweden hesitated under heavy debate for several years because of the costs and other issues. Following the parliament's decision in 1854 a colonel of the Navy Mechanical Corps, Nils Ericson, was chosen as the leader for the project of building the main lines (stambanorna). His proposal was that the line between Gothenburg and Stockholm (Västra Stambanan) should run south of Lake Mälaren to avoid competition with shipping. This was completed in 1862. He also proposed that the line between Malmö and Stockholm (Södra stamabanan) should go to Nässjö and then on to Falköping, where it would meet up with Västra stambanan. There was a decision that, for military reasons, the railways should avoid the coasts as much as possible.

The railway to Falköping was a temporary solution until Östra stambanan between Nässjö and Katrineholm, which lay further up along Västra stambanan, could be built. Nils Ericson's proposal also included the railway between Stockholm and Ånge (Norra stambanan) and Stambanan genom övre Norrland ("the main line through Upper Norrland") which runs between Bräcke and Boden. A railway between Oslo and Laxå (Nordvästra stambanan) was also planned. Laxå lies on Västra stambanan.

The first parts of Västra and Södra stambanan were opened in 1856. In 1862 the whole of Västra stambanan was opened and in 1864 Södra stambanan was opened in its entirety. Nordvästra stambanan was opened in 1871 and Östra stambanan in 1874.

The Norra stambanan opened in 1881 and Stambanan genom övre Norrland opened in 1894. A railway called Norrländska tvärbanan between Trondheim and Ånge opened in 1885.

When Ericson resigned in 1862 his authority was divided between two agencies – Byggnadsbyrån (The Building Bureau) and Trafikbyrån (The Traffic Bureau). In 1888 the agencies were combined again as Kungliga Järnvägsstyrelsen (The Royal Railway Committee).

=== Further expansion 1891–1937 ===
The railway building continued in 1891 when the construction of Malmbanan, an iron ore railway between Luleå and Narvik in Norway, was begun. It was finished in 1902.

In 1896 the state bought all railways on the west coast and began constructing Bohusbanan (the Bohuslän railway, Bohus Line) between Gothenburg and Strömstad. It was intended to continue to Oslo but the dissolution of the Swedish-Norwegian Union stopped the construction of the line and Strömstad became the end of the line.

In 1907 the first part of the Inland Line ("Inlandsbanan") was started. In 1909 the train ferry line between Trelleborg and Sassnitz was opened, making it possible to travel directly between Berlin and Stockholm.

In 1914 the railway between Norrköping (at Östra stambanan) and Järna (at Västra stambanan) opened, making the trip between Malmö and Stockholm shorter.

In 1917 a railway between Boden and Haparanda was finished, and two years later the Tornio–Haparanda railway with a bridge over the river Torne was built to connect Haparanda with the Finnish town of Tornio.

In 1927, the East Coast Line was completed.

In 1937, the Inland Railway was completed.

== Electrification ==
In order to avoid driving steam locomotives on the short stretch between Stockholm Östra station and Engelbrechtsplan in central Stockholm where the train traveled on city streets the line to Djursholm was electrified in 1895. The narrow-gauge 891 mm Roslagbanan suburban railway Engelbrechtsplan – Djursholms Ösby was electrified at 1,500 V d.c. In 1915 the Iron Ore Line (Malmbanan) was electrified between Kiruna–Riksgränsen by Swedish State Railways on the standard-gauge network at 15 kV 15 Hz. with power coming from the new hydroelectric station at Porjus. To enable the railway network to use converters from the national electric grids with its 50 Hz the frequency was changed to 16.7 Hz

Malmbanan's electrification was inaugurated in 1915 between Narvik-Kiruna, and in 1923 on the whole line including Ofotenbanen its natural continuation in Norway between the border and Narvik. Electrification was continued Västra Stambanan (Western Main Line) was electrified all the way in 1926, and Södra Stambanan (Southern Main Line) 1933, and Norra Stambanan all the way to Boden in 1942. This work was accelerated as the war had hampered coal and oil imports. In the 1950s all large railways had been electrified.

== New high speed lines from 1985 ==
Between 1937 and 1985 no new railway was built in Sweden, except for short industry tracks and similar. Instead many lines with little traffic were closed down. Their traffic was decreasing because the car and truck traffic increased.

It was decided to build double track along Västkustbanan, and with high speed standard, and in 1985 a new railway designed for 200 km/h (120 mph) was opened around Halmstad. In the following years several new railways were built, mostly prepared for 250 km/h (160 mph), mostly around Stockholm and along Västkustbanan. The signalling system and the trains do not allow more than 200 km/h (120 mph), and a higher speed will not be introduced before 2020. The old railways Västra Stambanan and Södra Stambanan have also been upgraded to allow 200 km/h (120 mph), where possible without changing the alignment, done mostly during 1985–2005.

== Liberalisation ==
Sweden is the first country in Europe where it was tested strategy of separation of infrastructure and services. The reform was approached in 1988. The reform divided Statens Järnväger State Railways (SJ) and created a new company Banverket (BV), which became the owner of the infrastructure. SJ runs trains and does so on a commercial basis without public subsidies.

A decision was made in March 2009 to cancel the monopoly for SJ. Already in the autumn 2009 free competition will be allowed on Saturdays and Sundays when there is more room on the tracks, and to a full extent all days in the autumn 2010.

While most current railway lines of Sweden were decided and built by the state, and receive their technical upkeep from the public as well, SJ no longer holds a monopoly on operating and owning passenger trains where such can be run profitably on a commercial basis. Large parts of the rail network serve parts of the country which don't generate enough passenger or cargo traffic to make a profit, and on some of these stretches SJ has held a de facto monopoly until very recently (2010, see below in this section) Average speed is an important factor regarding profitability (more distance per hour means more income per hour).

== See also ==
- History of Sweden
- Narrow-gauge railways in Sweden
- Rail transport in Sweden
