= Norrköping Municipality =

Norrköping Municipality Norrköpings kommun
- Municipality
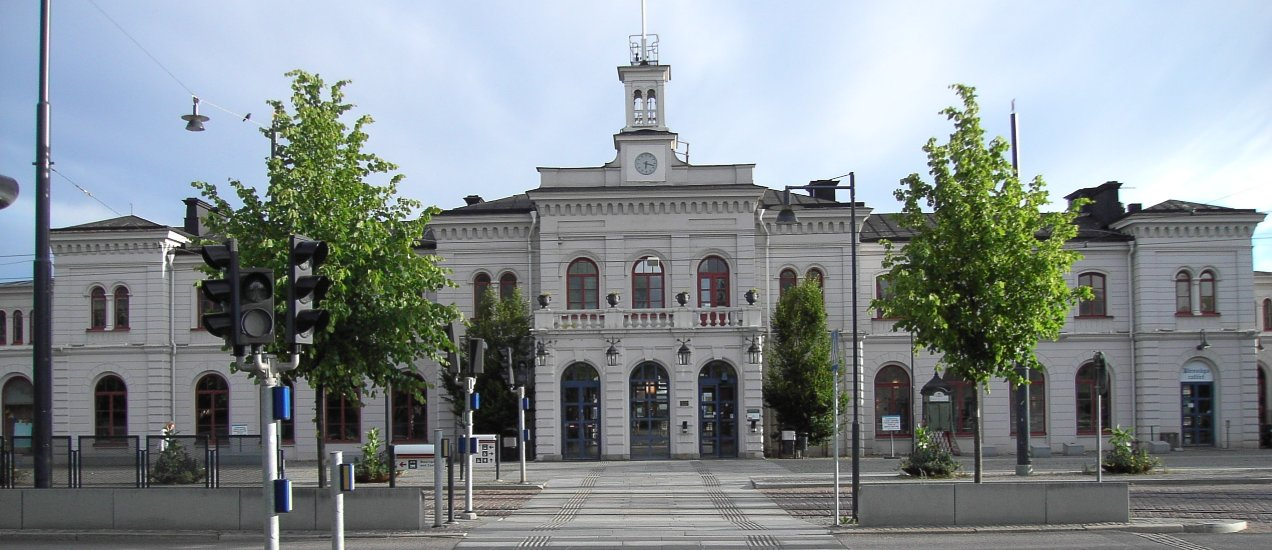
- Norrköping Railway Station

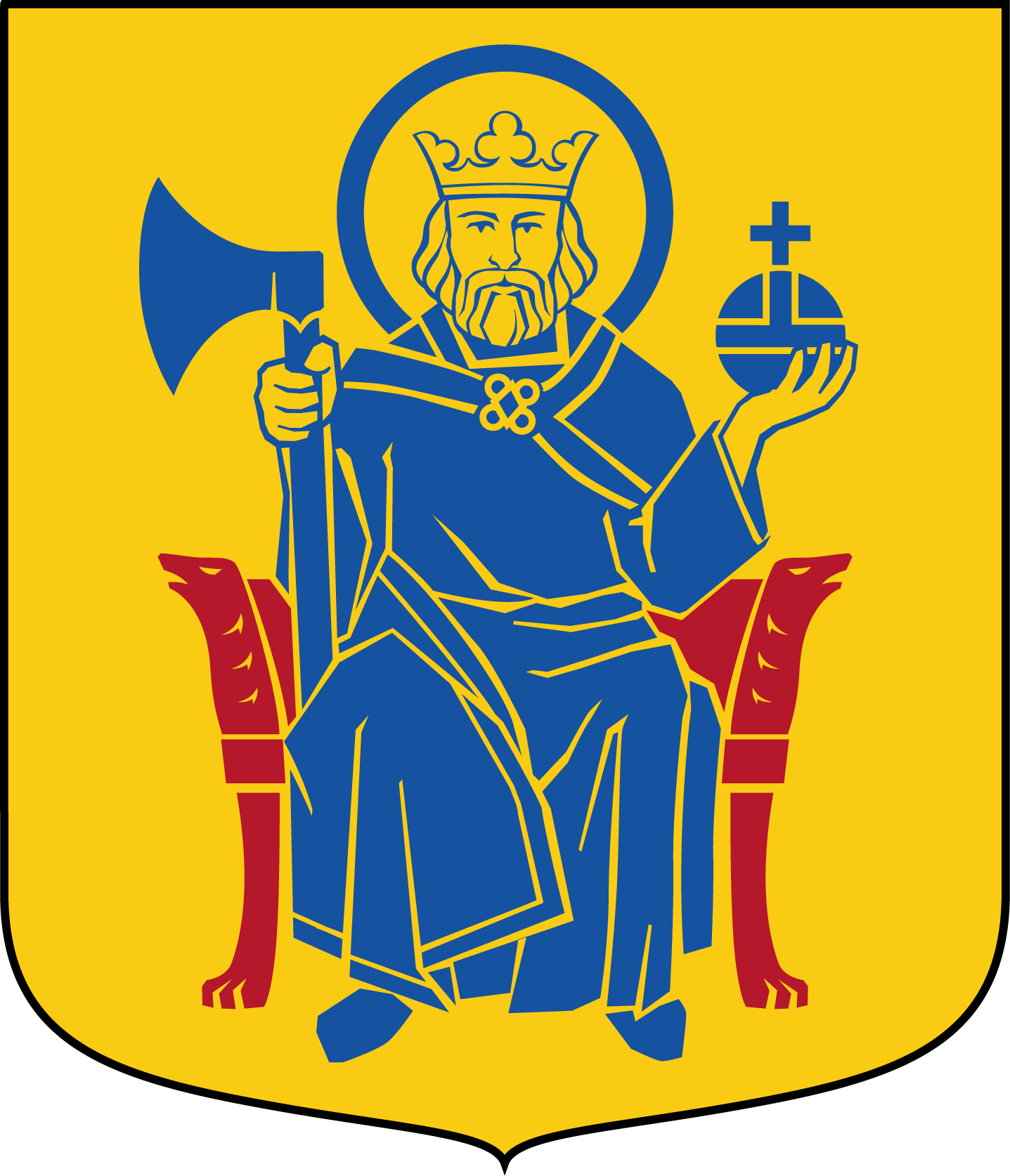
- Coat of arms

- Coordinates: 58°36′N 16°12′E
- Country: Sweden
- County: Östergötland County
- Seat: Norrköping

Area
  - Total: 2,047.58 km^{2} (790.58 sq mi)
  - Land: 1,495.05 km^{2} (577.24 sq mi)
  - Water: 552.53 km^{2} (213.33 sq mi)
- Area as of 1 January 2014.

Population (30 June 2025)
  - Total: 144,939
  - Density: 96.9459/km^{2} (251.089/sq mi)
- Time zone: UTC+1 (CET)
  - Summer (DST): UTC+2 (CEST)
- ISO 3166 code: SE
- Province: Östergötland and Södermanland
- Municipal code: 0581
- Website: www.norrkoping.se

Norrköping Municipality (Swedish: Norrköpings kommun) is a municipality in Östergötland County in southeast Sweden. Its seat is located in the city of Norrköping, with some 90,000 inhabitants. It is the largest municipality in Östergötland.

By the time of the local government reform of 1971 the City of Norrköping was amalgamated with the rural municipality of Skärblacka forming a new municipality of unitary type. In 1974 Vikbolandet was added. The number of original local government units (as of 1863) which are in the present municipality is 26.

== Localities ==
Places with more than 200 inhabitants as of 2000:

- Herstadberg
- Jursla
- Kimstad
- Krokek
- Lindö
- Ljunga
- Loddby
- Norrköping (seat)
- Norsholm
- Simonstorp
- Skärblacka
- Strömsfors
- Svärtinge
- Vånga
- Åby
- Åselstad
- Öbonäs
- Östra Husby

== Demographics ==
This is a demographic table based on Norrköping Municipality's electoral districts in the 2022 Swedish general election sourced from SVT's election platform, in turn taken from SCB official statistics.

In total there were 108,530 Swedish citizens of voting age resident in the municipality. 45.7% voted for the left coalition and 52.9% for the right coalition. Indicators are in percentage points except population totals and income.

Location	Residents	Citizen adults	Left vote	Right vote	Employed	Swedish parents	Foreign heritage	Income SEK	Degree
Location			%	%					
Atriumhusen	1,963	1,252	48.2	50.3	64	47	53	18,653	19
Berga-Långtorp	1,880	1,399	31.3	68.5	87	85	15	33,694	53
Berget N	1,170	934	49.0	49.4	75	69	31	27,002	57
Berget V	1,388	1,053	50.4	46.5	65	54	46	20,500	40
Berget Ö	1,385	1,032	54.6	43.6	58	62	38	17,251	54
Björkalund-Kårtorp	1,623	1,384	36.1	63.0	86	86	14	29,758	44
Borg	1,402	1,031	41.7	57.6	87	87	13	30,364	45
Brånnestad	1,786	1,257	37.6	61.9	86	74	26	29,851	46
Djäknepark	1,602	1,194	57.0	40.7	76	57	43	22,250	44
Ektorp C	1,614	1,067	51.4	46.6	71	54	46	21,720	30
Ektorp S	1,857	1,576	57.5	41.5	82	76	24	25,274	40
Eneby C	1,571	1,356	49.0	50.0	79	82	18	21,787	32
Haga N	1,788	1,370	47.0	51.1	76	67	33	21,830	28
Haga S	1,415	1,204	44.6	53.9	78	71	29	23,926	31
Hageby C	1,646	852	60.5	36.8	50	21	79	13,592	22
Hallberga-Fyrby	1,474	1,117	38.8	60.1	82	79	21	28,328	44
Hultdalen-Skriketorp	1,868	1,387	44.2	54.8	87	88	12	27,654	42
Jursla	2,063	1,510	42.2	56.9	87	89	11	32,115	55
Karlshov-Sandbyhov	1,444	1,122	42.2	57.6	84	78	22	30,437	53
Kimstad	1,870	1,441	42.0	56.8	86	89	11	28,728	45
Klingsberg	1,747	1,436	52.6	46.6	77	76	24	23,064	45
Klockaretorpet N	2,082	1,420	45.8	52.3	70	51	49	21,597	28
Klockaretorpet S	1,837	1,262	45.1	53.0	73	62	38	22,046	26
Klockaretorpet Ö	1,793	1,301	48.5	50.0	81	67	33	25,849	44
Kneippen	1,450	1,200	39.1	60.2	85	90	10	30,692	59
Kolmården V	1,430	1,098	38.0	59.8	85	90	10	28,856	42
Kolmården Ö	1,554	1,163	44.0	54.7	83	92	8	26,481	41
Krokek N	1,541	1,106	40.6	58.1	90	94	6	29,497	46
Krokek S	1,807	1,349	43.6	55.6	87	94	6	28,307	48
Kuddby	1,824	1,464	33.9	65.1	88	95	5	27,664	32
Kullerstad-Vickelby	1,977	1,484	45.9	53.5	89	91	9	26,660	32
Kvarnberget-Tingstad	1,761	1,242	41.5	56.2	83	69	31	28,888	42
Kärrhagen-Kättsätter	1,677	1,289	41.7	57.7	88	85	15	30,703	56
Kättinge	1,614	1,386	32.8	65.8	84	95	5	23,833	31
Lagerlunda-Herstadberg	1,556	1,182	48.0	51.3	76	71	29	26,400	36
Lindö V	1,829	1,320	31.8	67.7	89	85	15	33,797	56
Lindö Ö	1,659	1,288	28.9	70.5	84	83	17	35,170	59
Ljunga	2,133	1,606	35.8	63.4	88	93	7	30,668	43
Ljura	1,891	1,251	55.3	42.1	65	48	52	19,835	33
Mamre	1,532	1,064	50.8	47.7	67	30	70	19,652	29
Marielund M	1,796	974	63.6	32.1	59	29	71	15,903	33
Marielund S	1,612	1,351	55.5	43.2	79	73	27	26,292	53
Marielund V	1,353	1,043	48.8	49.8	77	66	34	23,654	39
Mosstorp	2,016	1,548	39.1	60.4	85	88	12	25,520	26
Nordantill NO	1,772	1,461	53.2	45.7	76	61	39	23,361	47
Nordantill NV	1,583	1,131	60.5	37.3	69	50	50	19,809	40
Nordantill SO	1,585	1,330	51.8	47.2	76	70	30	27,708	60
Nordantill SV	1,577	1,259	56.5	41.9	74	66	34	23,672	51
Norsholm-Skärkind	1,497	1,162	37.0	62.3	87	93	7	29,041	41
Oxelbergen N	1,687	1,389	45.3	53.4	81	83	17	26,511	41
Oxelbergen S	1,701	1,416	48.8	48.8	80	77	23	26,243	44
Porten	1,710	917	58.0	37.7	50	22	78	13,866	23
Portlåset	1,526	1,051	59.6	36.4	46	23	77	12,832	20
Pryssgården	1,717	1,286	43.1	55.8	85	85	15	31,242	49
Rambodal N	2,022	1,397	39.7	60.2	88	85	15	30,346	48
Rambodal S	1,810	1,310	41.1	57.6	89	83	17	30,324	51
Ringdansen	2,421	1,351	65.4	31.3	48	25	75	12,827	19
Rosen-Gamla staden	1,354	1,076	53.9	45.1	74	61	39	24,314	46
Saltängen-Nya torget	1,353	1,124	42.3	56.5	79	73	27	28,669	52
Sankt Johannes	1,427	1,263	50.3	48.8	82	79	21	24,926	47
Skarphagen	1,640	1,345	44.2	53.9	75	82	18	23,682	44
Smedby	1,818	1,401	42.6	56.3	88	86	14	27,759	52
Strömbacken-Ektorp	1,926	1,283	49.3	49.2	66	56	44	19,230	39
Strömparken	1,483	1,186	49.7	49.0	73	74	26	24,894	52
Svärtinge M	1,998	1,356	40.4	59.3	89	87	13	34,164	51
Svärtinge V	1,027	726	34.6	64.0	92	82	18	34,620	59
Svärtinge Ö	1,568	1,193	37.3	61.9	89	87	13	31,385	46
Såpkullen	1,585	1,285	45.6	54.0	72	69	31	22,701	47
Söder Tull	1,615	1,398	56.9	41.8	81	71	29	22,967	49
Söderporten	1,644	956	61.4	37.3	54	16	84	14,272	26
Söderstaden V	1,475	1,230	50.6	48.0	78	80	20	23,051	43
Söderstaden Ö	1,634	1,399	44.9	54.3	84	83	17	26,364	54
Taborsberg	1,643	1,292	45.9	52.8	77	77	23	24,866	39
Torshag-Simonstorp	1,856	1,452	37.6	61.1	87	90	10	30,201	47
Vasaparken-Ljurafältet	1,736	1,365	55.6	42.1	69	66	34	21,044	40
Vidablick	1,507	1,214	47.6	51.4	74	82	18	20,384	30
Vilbergen N	1,703	1,322	46.2	52.9	77	84	16	19,633	27
Vilbergen S	1,510	1,306	49.4	49.8	73	82	18	20,215	31
Vilbergen V	1,542	1,235	50.3	48.3	82	78	22	22,816	32
Vrinnevi-Klingsborg	1,661	995	62.8	34.2	56	33	67	15,452	31
Vånga	1,694	1,379	36.7	61.9	88	94	6	28,688	31
Åby Ö	1,855	1,410	44.3	54.6	88	89	11	29,384	49
Åbymo	1,804	1,417	46.5	51.5	72	79	21	21,060	29
Östantill V	1,500	1,161	59.4	38.3	62	44	56	17,015	41
Östantill Ö	1,704	1,314	55.3	43.9	73	52	48	22,397	44
Östra Husby	2,017	1,622	38.0	60.9	88	94	6	26,835	36
Source: SVT

== Government and infrastructure ==
The Swedish Transport Agency has its headquarters in Norrköping, Norrköping Municipality. When the Civil Aviation Administration existed, its head office was in Norrköping.

== International relations ==
=== Twin towns — Sister cities ===
Norrköping is twinned with:

- Esslingen, Germany
- Klaksvík, Faroe Islands
- Kópavogur, Iceland
- Linz, Austria
- Odense Municipality, Denmark
- Riga, Latvia
- Tampere, Finland
- Trondheim, Norway (since 1946)

== See also ==
- Köping (concept)
- Nävsjön
- Å, Sweden
