= Värmland =

Historical province of Sweden

Coordinates: 59°45′N 13°15′E

- Historical province
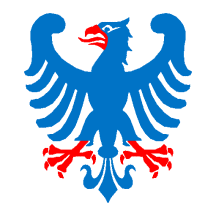
- Flag Coat of arms

- Country: Sweden
- Land: Svealand
- Counties: Värmland, Örebro, Västra Götaland

Area
  - Total: 18,164 km^{2} (7,013 sq mi)

Population (31 December 2023)
  - Total: 322,034
  - Density: 17.729/km^{2} (45.919/sq mi)
- Demonym: Värmlänning

Ethnicity
  - Languages: Swedish
  - Dialect: Värmländska; Götamål

Culture
  - Flower: Chickweed wintergreen
  - Animal: Wolf
  - Bird: Red-throated diver
  - Fish: Smelt
- Time zone: UTC+1 (CET)
  - Summer (DST): UTC+2 (CEST)
- ISO 3166 code: SE-S

Värmland (Swedish pronunciation: [ˈvæ̌rmland]) is a landskap (historical province) in west-central Sweden. It borders Västergötland, Dalsland, Dalarna, Västmanland, and Närke, and is bounded by Norway in the west.

== Name ==
Several Latinized versions of the name exist, including Varmelandia, Vermelandia, Wermelandia, Værmalandia, Værmolandia, Virmolandia and Vermillandia.

Some of the Latinised forms show the origin of the name to come from the large local lake by the name of Värmeln (from older *Virmil); others from the river name *Værma, the main outlet of that lake. The province was originally part of Götaland, and became part of Svealand in 1815.

Wermland is an obsolete Swedish spelling of the name, which may still be seen in proper names such as Nya Wermlands-Tidningen, a newspaper.

== Administration ==
=== Sub-divisions ===
Sweden's provinces were sub-divided into hundreds or districts. Värmland was historically divided into chartered cities and districts. One district formed part of Bergslagen and was a mountain district, and all the other districts were hundreds.

- Edsberg Hundred
- Fryksdal Hundred
- Färnebo Hundred
- Gillberg Hundred
- Grums Hundred
- Jösse Hundred
- Karlstad Hundred
- Karlskoga Mountain District
- Kil Hundred
- Nordmark Hundred
- Nyed Hundred
- Näs Hundred
- Visnum Hundred
- Väse Hundred
- Älvdal Hundred
- Ölme Hundred

== Geography ==
The largest lake is Vänern. Most streams of importance lead to Vänern. However, the province is rich in small lakes, ponds and streams. The scenery, with mountains and lakes, is usually regarded as picturesque and has inspired painters and writers.

=== Western Värmland ===
There are several mountain plateaus in the western part of Värmland, which is in the Scandinavian Mountains. The highest elevations are found in the northern parts, with plateaus of 500–700 metres (1,600–2,300 ft). The highest peak is also located here, Granberget at Höljes, 701 metres (2,300 ft).

=== Eastern Värmland ===
The eastern part of Värmland is counted as part of the Bergslagen, the Central Swedish Mining District. Its terrain is rather hilly, with a few high hills: Hvitklinten 414 m (1,358 ft), Dalkarlsberget 450 m (1,480 ft) and Vålbergsrös 476 m (1,562 ft).

This part of Värmland is rich in minerals, most notably iron ore which exists in large quantities. Some notable sites in this area are around Långban and Nordmark Hundred. In the southeast, the ridge of Kilsbergen marks the border with Närke.

=== Gallery ===
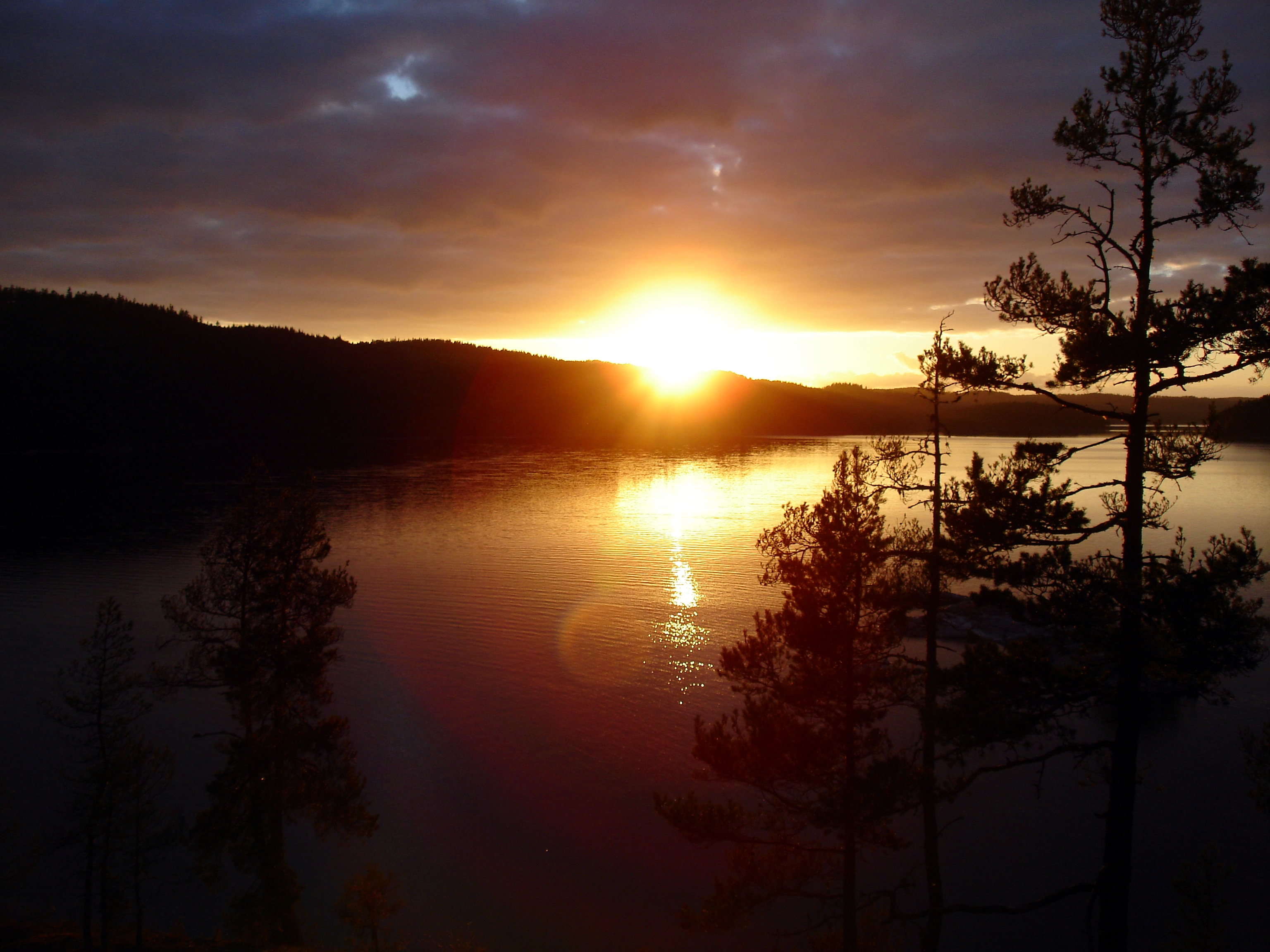
Sunset on the lake Foxen located in the borderland between southwest Värmland and Norway.

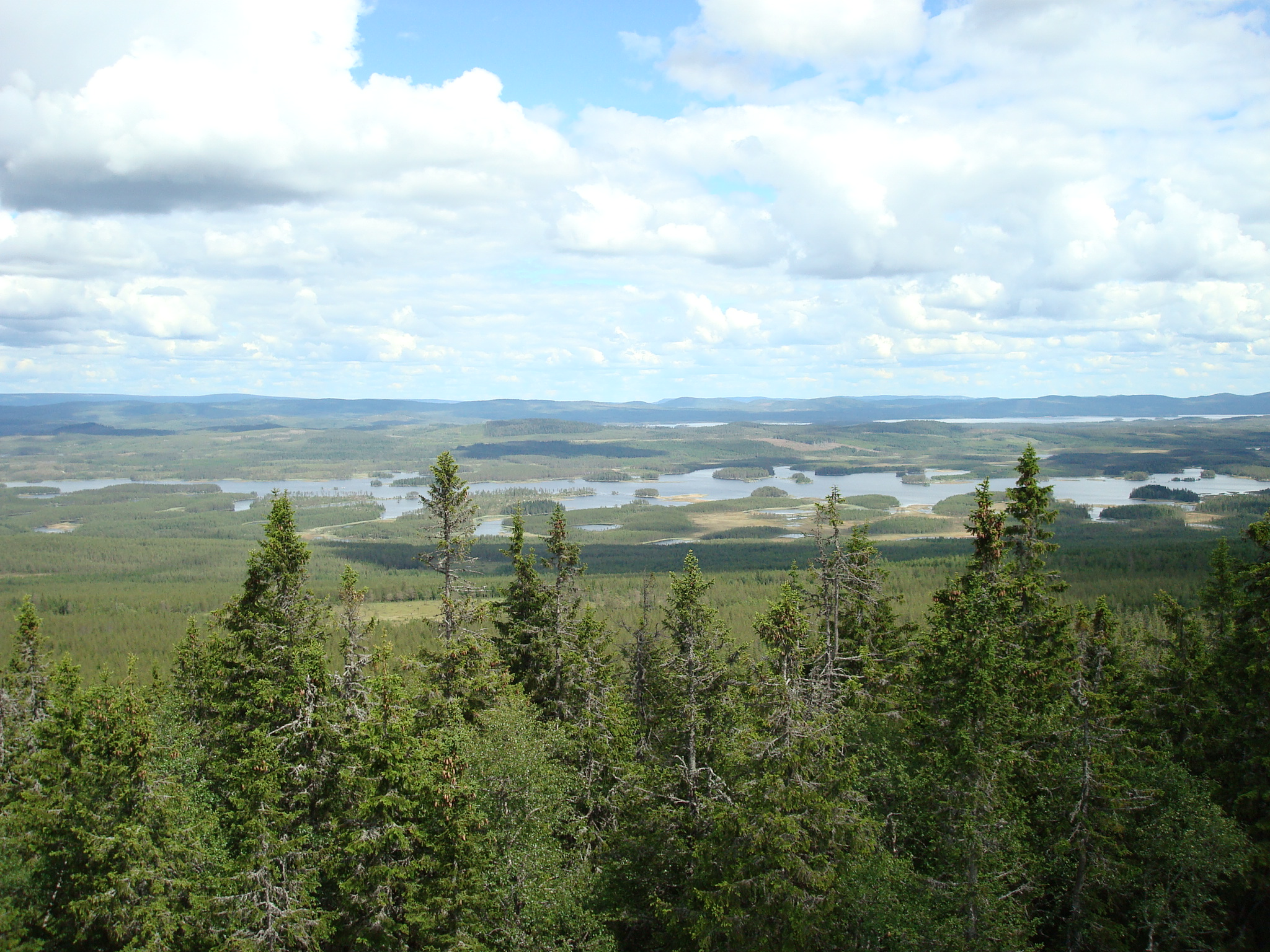
The view from Granberget.

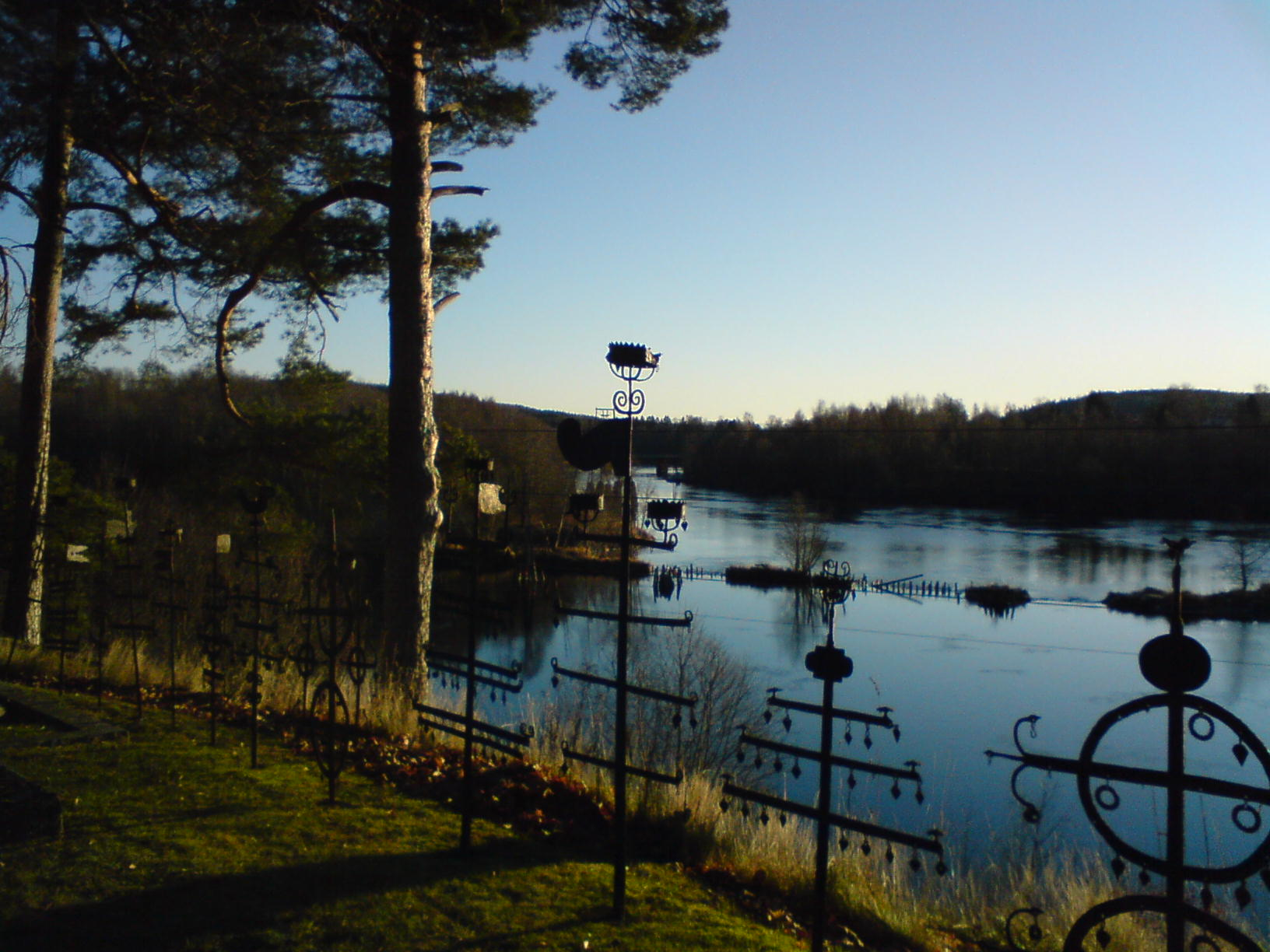
Klarälven seen from Ullerud Church, near Deje.

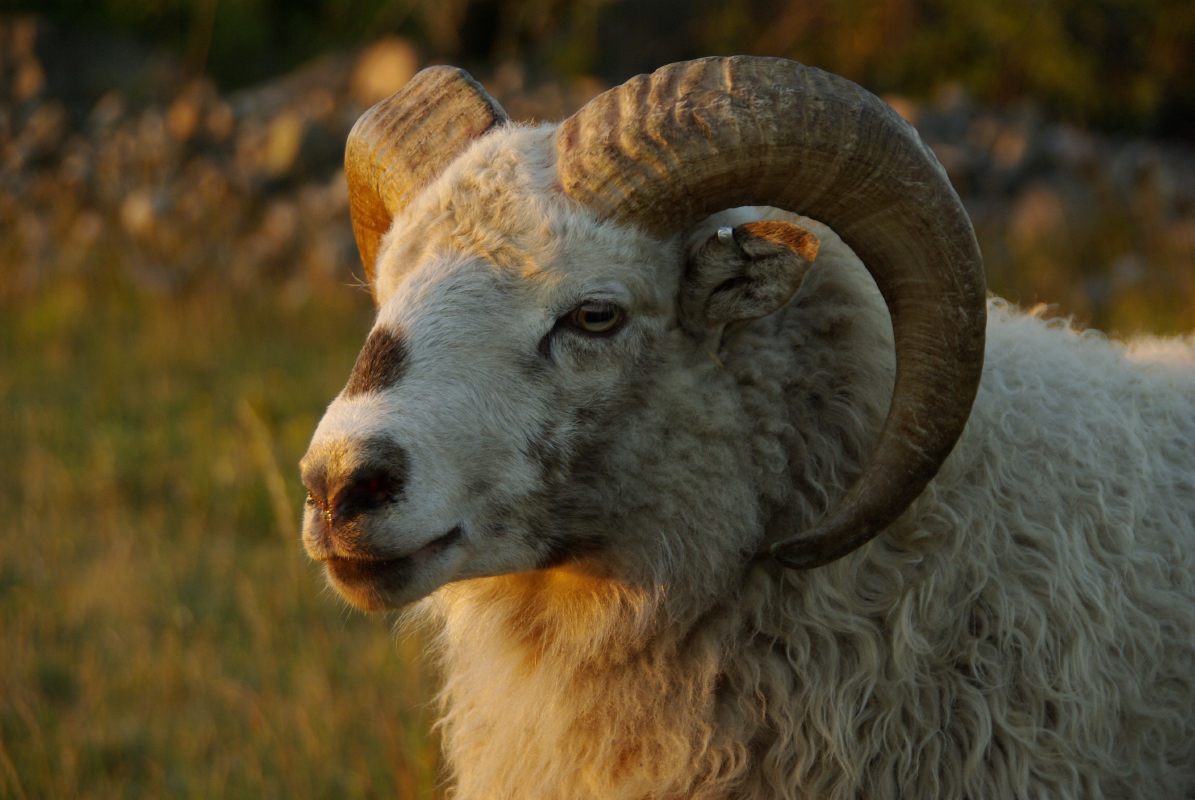
The Värmland sheep is one of the oldest Swedish sheep breeds.

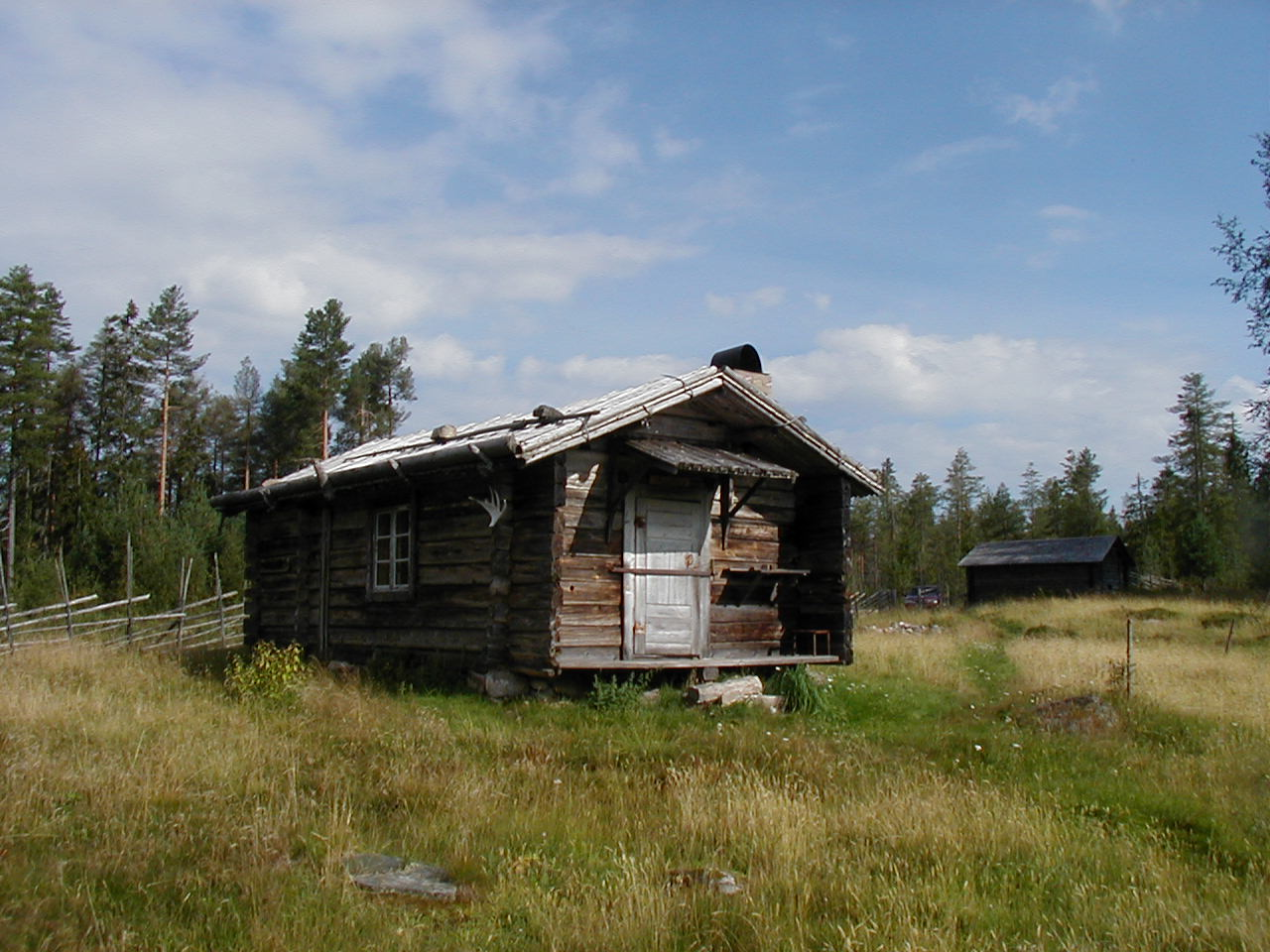
Cottage at Sannsatra outside Torsby.

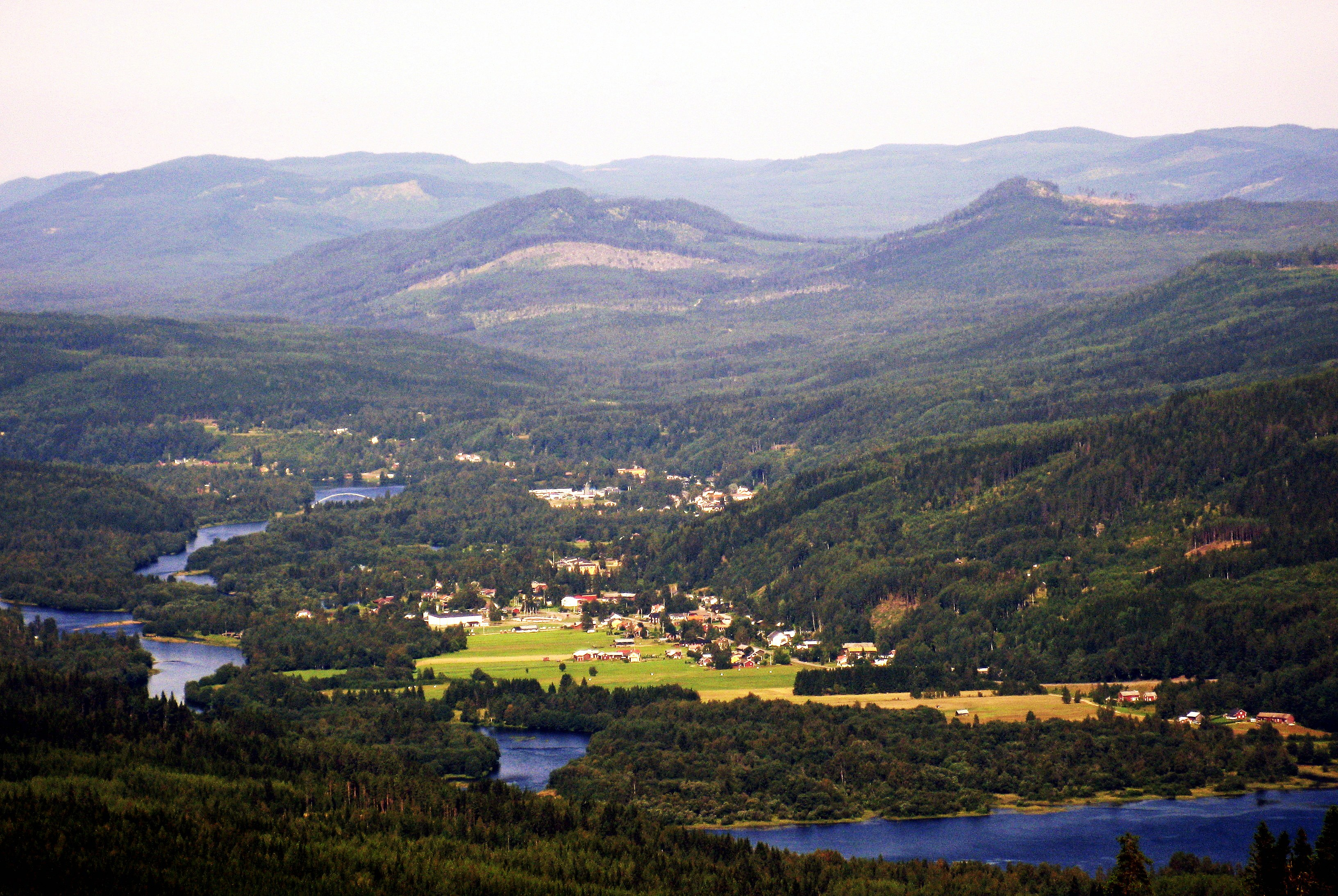
Sysslebäck.

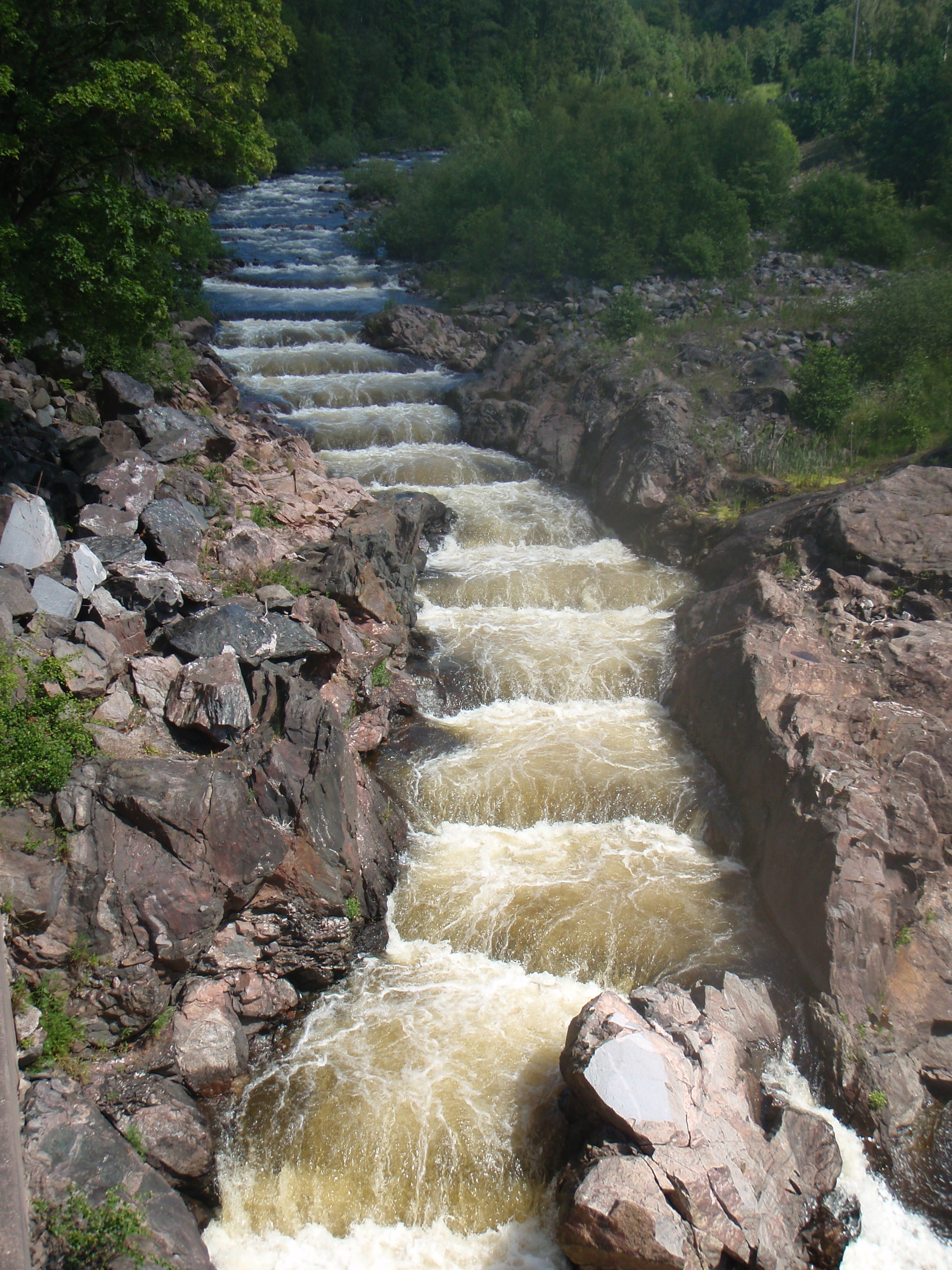
Fish ladder for Salmon near the power station in Gullspång.

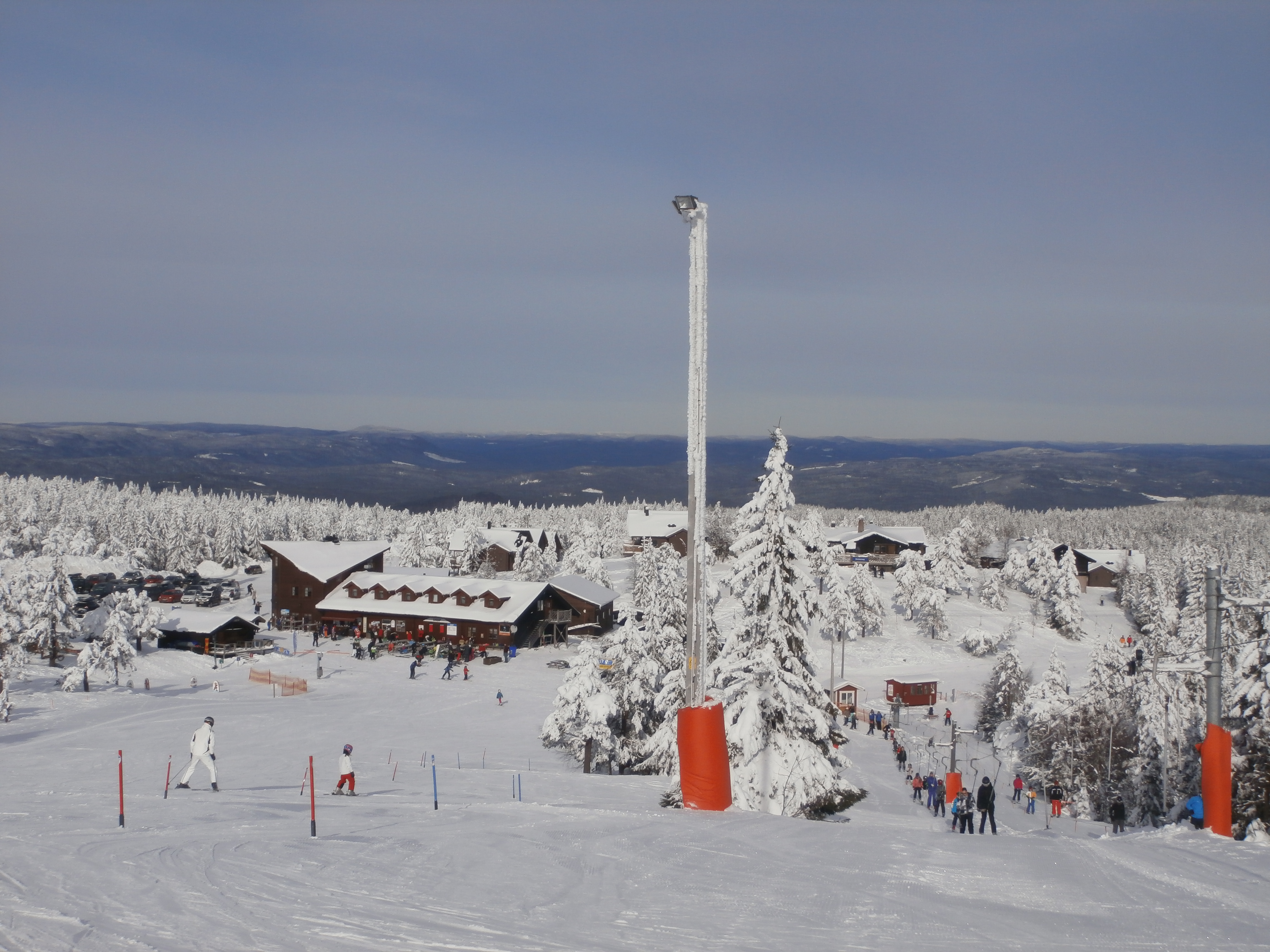
The ski resort Hovfjället.

== Demographics ==
=== Population ===
The population of Värmland is 322,612 as of 31 December 2022. It is distributed over three counties as follows:

County	Population
Värmland County, partly	283,976
Örebro County, partly	38,232
Västra Götaland County, peripherally	404

== History ==
The province was sparsely populated in the pre-historic age compared to Sweden's southern half. Its 5,500 registered ancient remains are few, compared to other areas. The province was considered to be of minor importance in the Swedish Realm. There are, however, interesting histories told by Snorri Sturlasson about Värmland in the 13th century. It extends back to Ingjald Illråde a legendary king in the 7th century. These stories say that Olof Trätälja, the son of Ingjald, was not accepted as king and had to flee and settled in the then sparsely populated Värmland. More men had to flee the brutal successor of Ingjald and settled in Värmland. Archaeology shows that at this time there was indeed a large increase in population, and memorials of powerful men were constructed. According to Snorri and other Icelandic sources, Värmland came under Norwegian control in the late 9th and through the 10th century. However, by the time of Adam of Bremen in the 11th century the region is described as Swedish. In Adam's account, the värmlänningar are described as a distinct "Swedish tribe" along with the Sviar, Geats and Skridfinnar (commonly taken to be Sami people).

The early history was strongly influenced not only by the proximity to Västergötland, but also by its western neighbour Norway. Sweden's war with Norway had a strong effect on Värmland too. In 1225, Haakon IV of Norway (Haakon the Old) invaded Sweden and burnt down all villages if they did not pay a ransom. This feud was eventually settled in 1249.

Värmland was originally considered a part of Götaland, and had a strong connection to its southern neighbour Västergötland. Eastern Värmland traditionally belongs to the Bergslagen area, Sweden's central mining district.

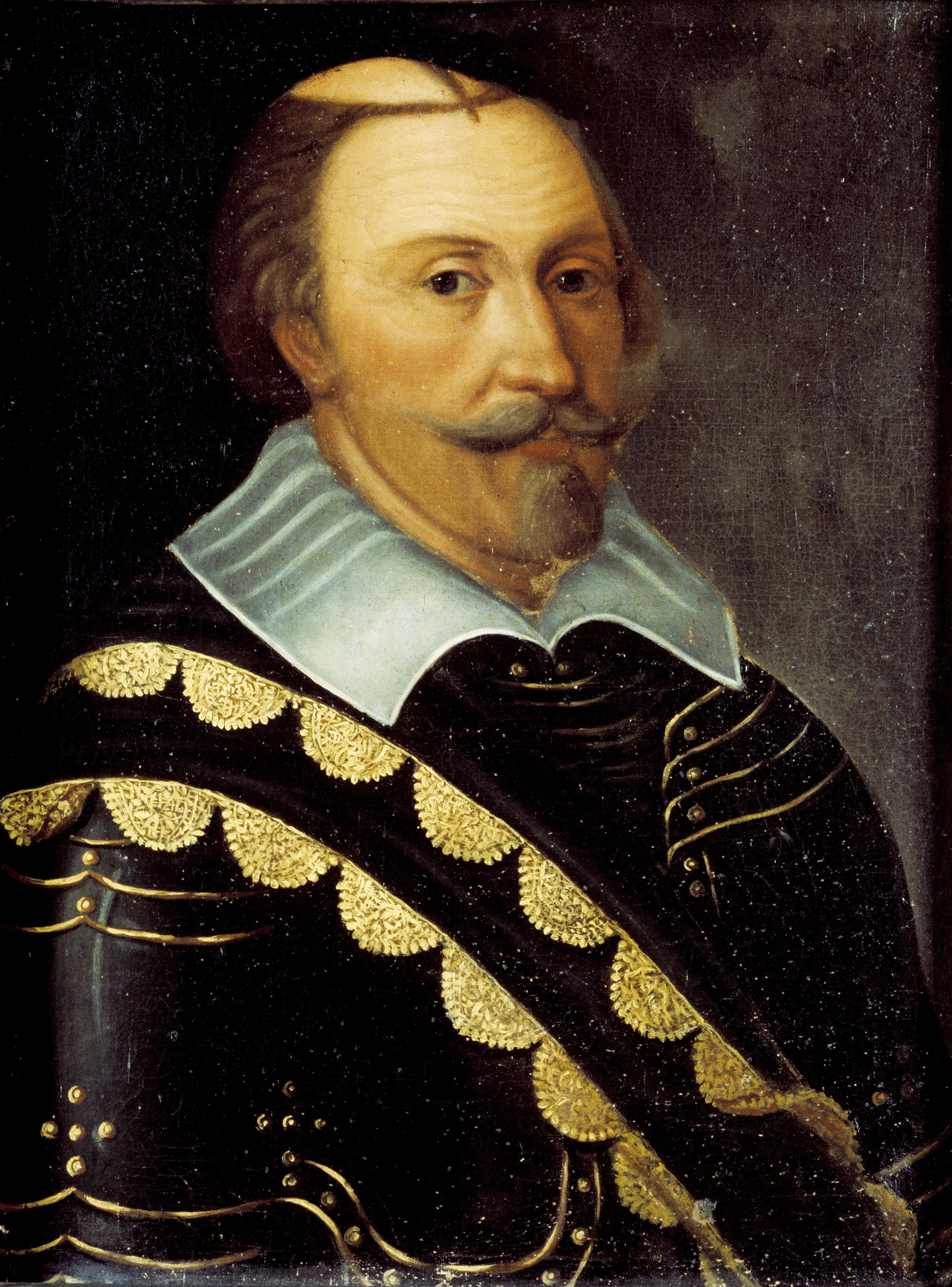
King Charles IX, Duke of Värmland (1560-1611)

In 1582, Värmland was granted its first city privileges, Kristinehamn, but those were revoked. The second city, Karlstad, on the north shore of lake Vänern, was granted by Duke Charles, later king Charles IX of Sweden, in 1584. It became the capital of the province and its name is derived from the King, and literally means Charles' City. The third city was Filipstad in 1611; however, its privilege was revoked in 1694 after a devastating fire. King Charles IX took great personal interest in expanding mining in the province and the industry developed significantly during his reign.

The early 17th century marked the beginning of substantial immigration from Finland. The areas where they centred were known as Finnskog. They kept their Finnish customs and language until the late 19th century. The last native resident to speak Finnish here died in the 1980s.

The most significant coup d'état of modern Swedish history had its beginning in Karlstad. The man behind the uprising was a liberal nobleman and a prominent man of the opposition, major general Georg Adlersparre. He was backed up by the radical guards captain Carl Henrik Anckarsvärd and used the part of the western army that was stationed in Värmland to occupy Karlstad on the night of 7 March 1809. From there he officially proclaimed a revolution, a proclamation which held the view that wars and oppression had ruined the country and the government therefore had to be overthrown. On 9 March, Adlersparre and his enthusiastic soldiers (many of Finnish origin) finally began their march towards Stockholm, and in the events that followed, the king Gustav IV Adolf abdicated under pressure.

Under the Continental System (1806–1814), the timber industry flourished in Värmland and continuing into the modern era, forestry became industrialized and is still the economic backbone of the province.

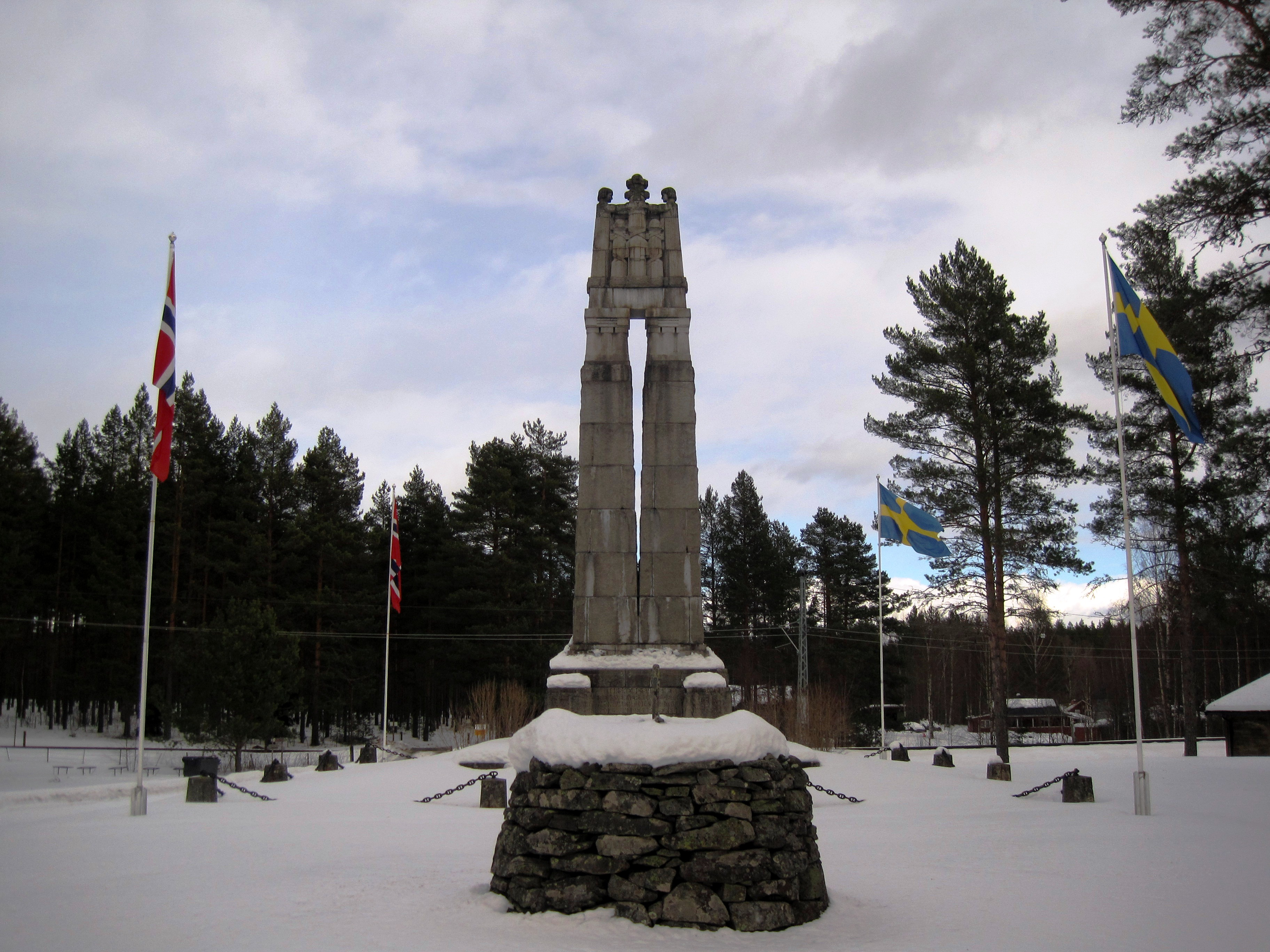
The peace monument at Morokulien, raised in 1914 to commemorate 100 years of peace between Sweden and Norway

Bordering Norway, Värmland was affected by Sweden's last war, Crown Prince Jean Baptiste Bernadottes military campaign against Norway in 1814. The province saw large troop movement and many soldiers originating from the province were involved in battles. The Värmland Regiment had three battalions attached to the 9th Brigade under Colonel Klingspor and one battalion attached to the 10th Brigade under Colonel Gahn af Colqhoun. Both brigades were part of the 5th Army Division under Major General Rosenblad. The 9th Brigade crossed the border to Norway on 30 July 1814 and participated in the siege of Fredrikstad Fortress, which capitulated on 4 August, while other parts of the regiment a few days later followed later Lieutenant General Vegesacks department north and participated in battles at Rakkestad and Langenäs on 6 August 1814 and Askim on 9 August 1814. A battalion of the regiment, commanded by Major Lagerlöv, managed to fight back a Norwegian attack from the bridgehead at Langenäs. The 10th Brigade crossed the border on 1 August 1814 and went in the direction of Morast. It participated in the Battle of Lier south of Kongsvinger on 2 August 1814 and then retreated to the border, where the battalion participated in the battle of Midskog on 5 August 1814 and suffered heavy losses.

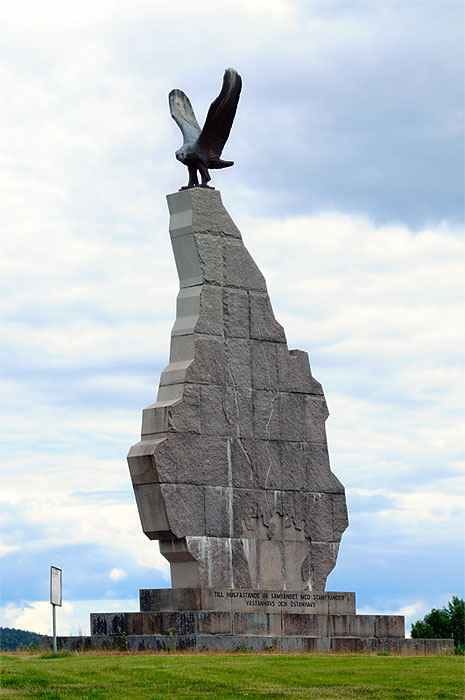
Monument outside Sunne honours the Finns who immigrated to Värmland and Swedish emigrants to the USA from Värmland

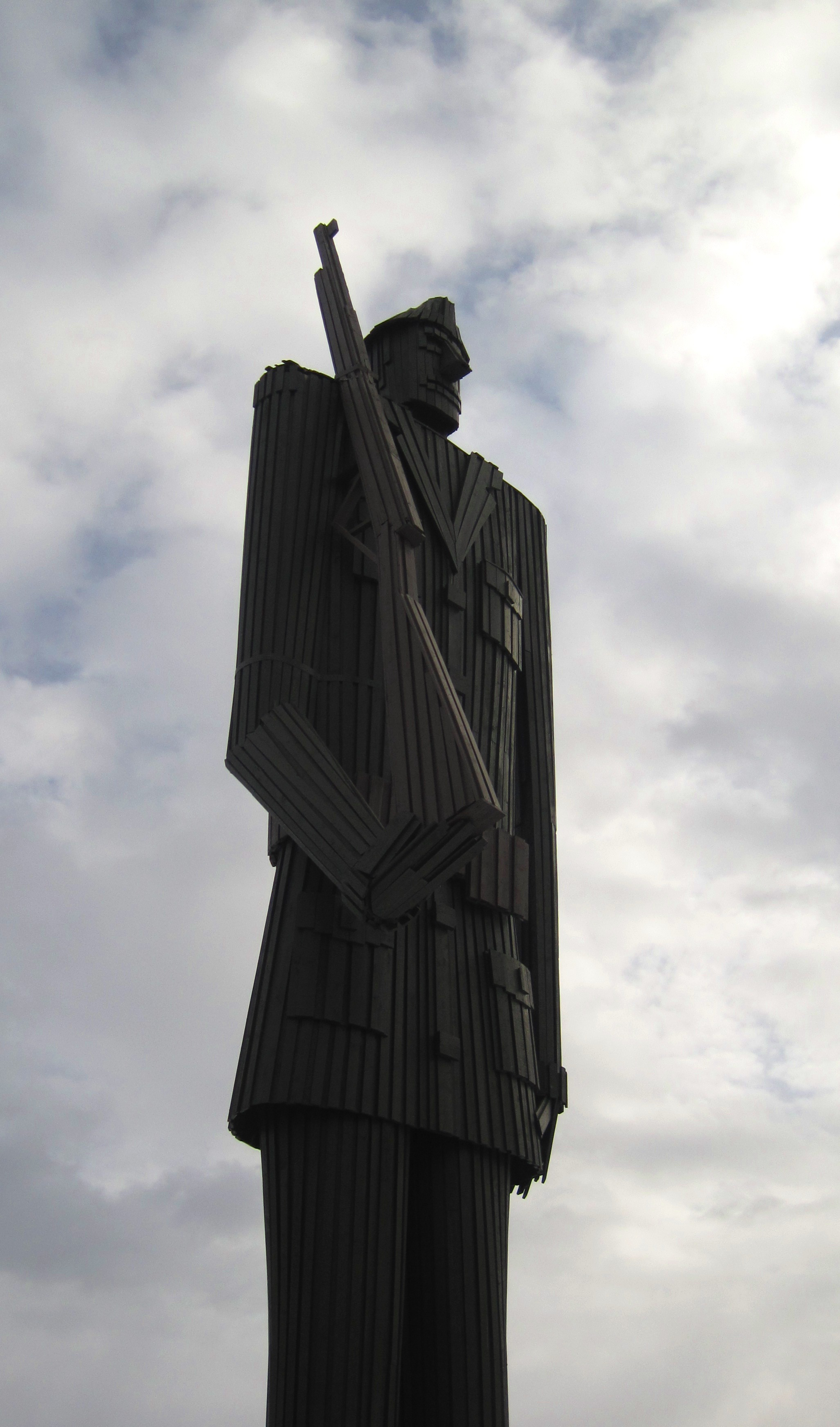
The Wooden Soldier in Charlottenberg called 61:an Martinsson, a memorial to WW II

During World War II, western Värmland was again an area of heavy military deployment. A major part of the Swedish Armed Forces was concentrated to Värmland following the German invasion of Norway. Approximately 150,000 military personnel were mobilised to Värmland in June 1941, by the time of German demands to transport the fully armed Division Engelbrecht through the country and before the launch of Operation Barbarossa, and with several large military exercises being conducted in the province during the period. Even more military personnel, possibly as many as 250,000, were mobilised to Värmland in the fall of 1943, due to the pending Swedish announcement to end German military transits and fear of a German attack.

An agreement from the dissolution of the union with Norway in 1905 stated that no fortification was allowed on the border between the two nations, but after the German occupation of Norway, old fortifications were renovated and many new constructed. Notably is the fortification Skansen Hultet (Skans 153 Hultet) in Eda Municipality, constructed 1940-1941 (although improvements continued until 1945), and equipped with a network of machine gun emplacements, casemates and other concrete bunkers, surrounded by barbed wire, walls and several lines of tank traps. The fortifications have been renovated by locals and are now open to the public. Formerly classified Swedish military documents shows that the Swedish Armed Forces spent approximately SEK 30 million on fortifications in Värmland during the 1940s. There are around 12,000 military objects, including 123 fortified sites, in Värmland dating from World War II.

The film Gränsen (Eng. Beyond the Border) from 2011, telling the story about the life of the young soldiers guarding the border between Sweden and German-occupied Norway in 1942, takes place in northern Värmland and was filmed near Torsby.

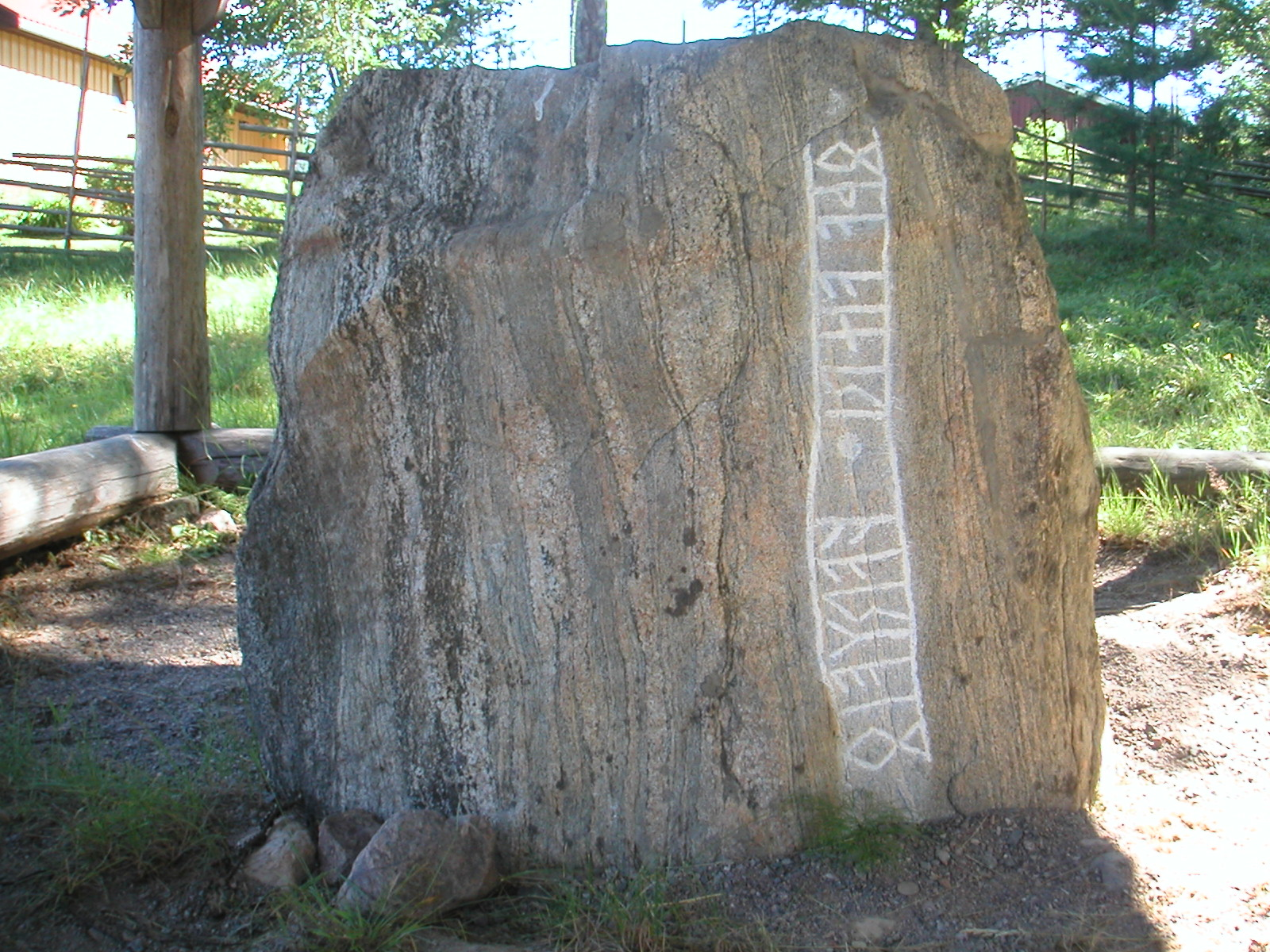
The runestone Skramlestenen found outside Gunnarskog is dated to early Viking Age, between the 5th and 6th century.

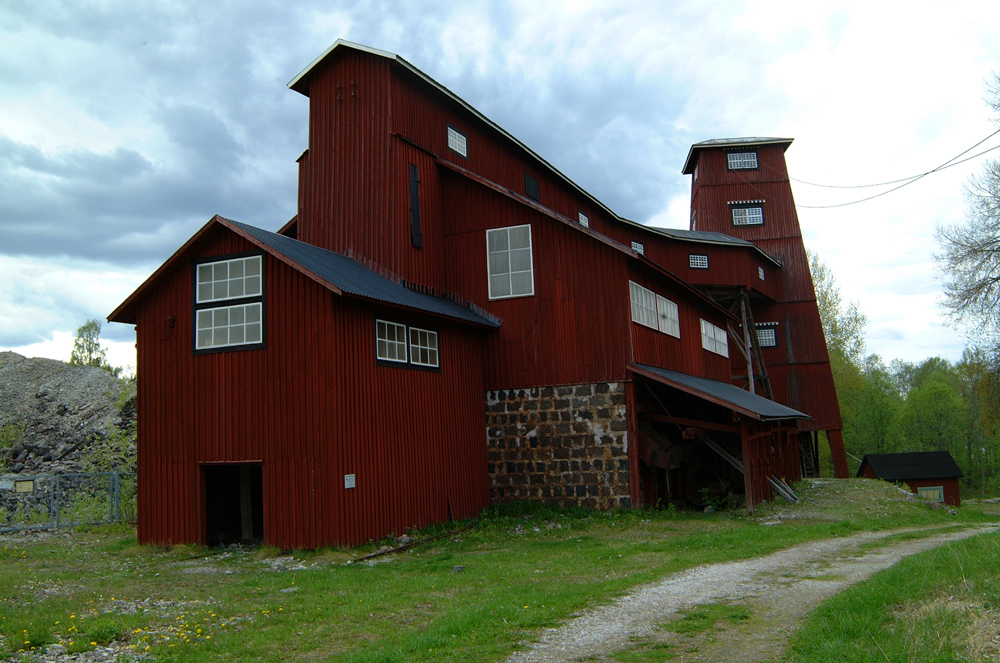
The mining area Långban in eastern Värmland, active between 1711 and 1972.

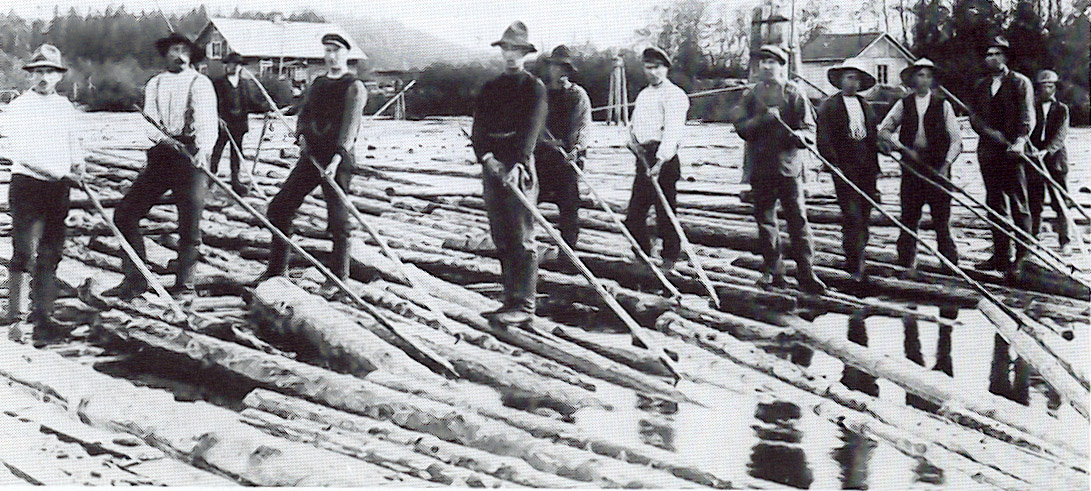
A workforce of log drivers ("Loggers") transporting timber on Klarälven, near Forshaga in 1918.

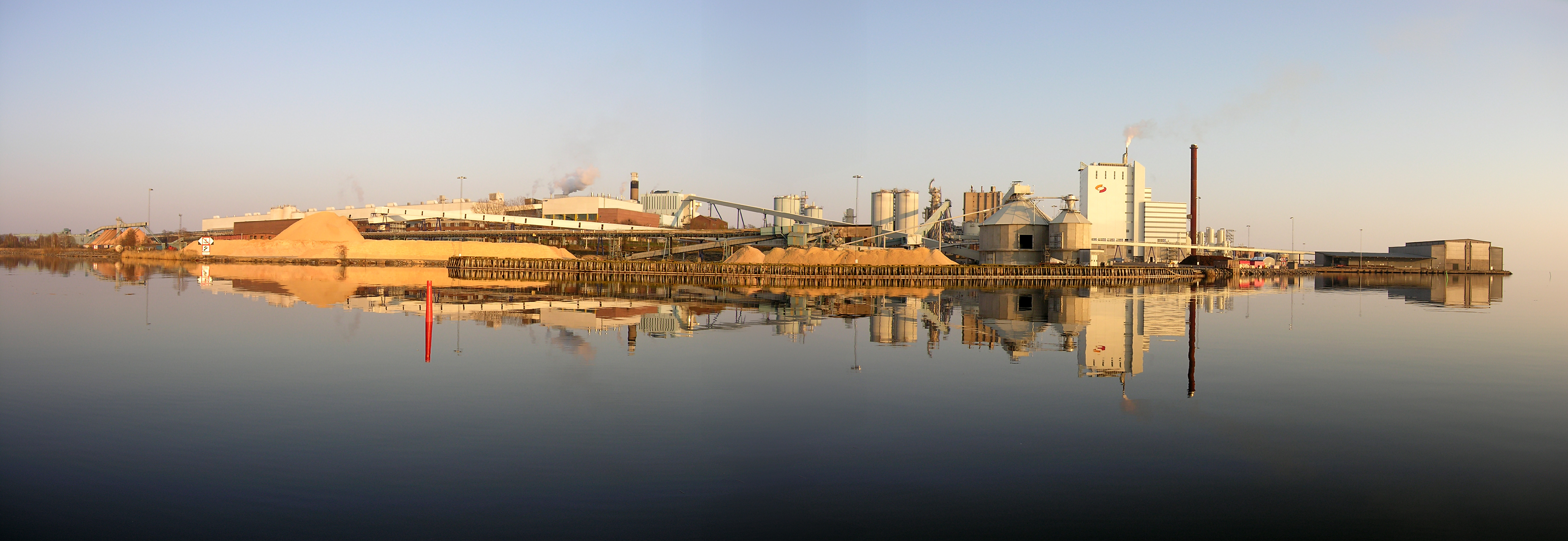
The Skoghall Mill, production of carton board owned by Stora Enso.

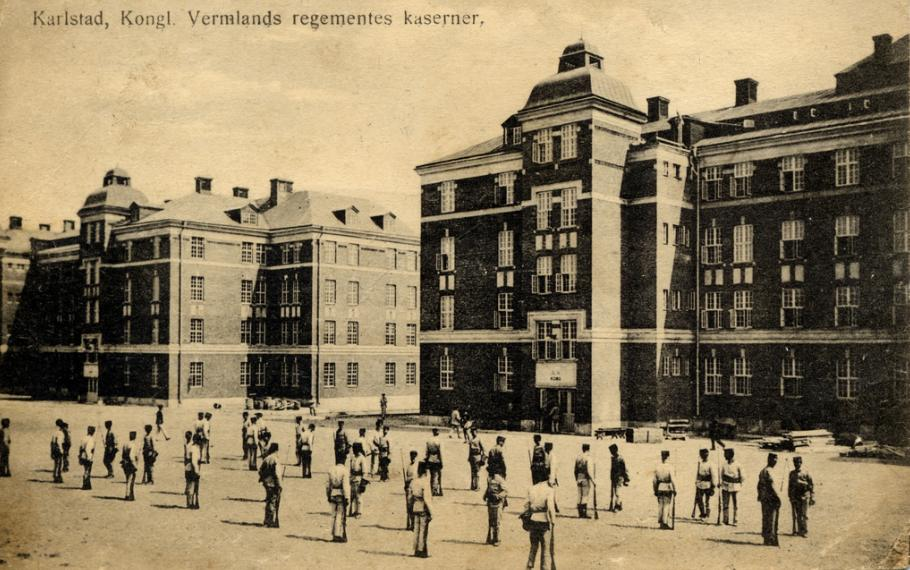
The Military Barracks of the Värmland Regiment in 1920.

=== Dukes ===
Since 1772, Sweden's Princes have been created Dukes of various provinces in Sweden. This is solely a nominal title.

- Prince Carl Adolf (1798)
- Crown Prince Gustaf (from his birth in 1858 until he became King in 1907)
- Prince Carl Philip (1979–present)

=== Chartered cities ===
- Arvika (town charter 1811, city charter 1911)
- Filipstad (city charter 1611–1695, town charter 1720, city charter 1835)
- Hagfors (city charter 1950)
- Karlskoga (city charter 1940)
- Karlstad (city charter 1584)
- Kristinehamn (city charter 1582–1584, city charter 1642)
- Säffle (town charter 1882, city charter 1951)

=== Provincial districts ===
- Fryksdal
- Färnebo
- Gillberg
- Grums
- Jösse
- Karlskoga
- Karlstad
- Kil
- Nordmark
- Nyeds (ceded from Kil, 1681)
- Näs
- Visnums
- Väse
- Älvdal
- Ölme

== Culture ==
=== Literature ===
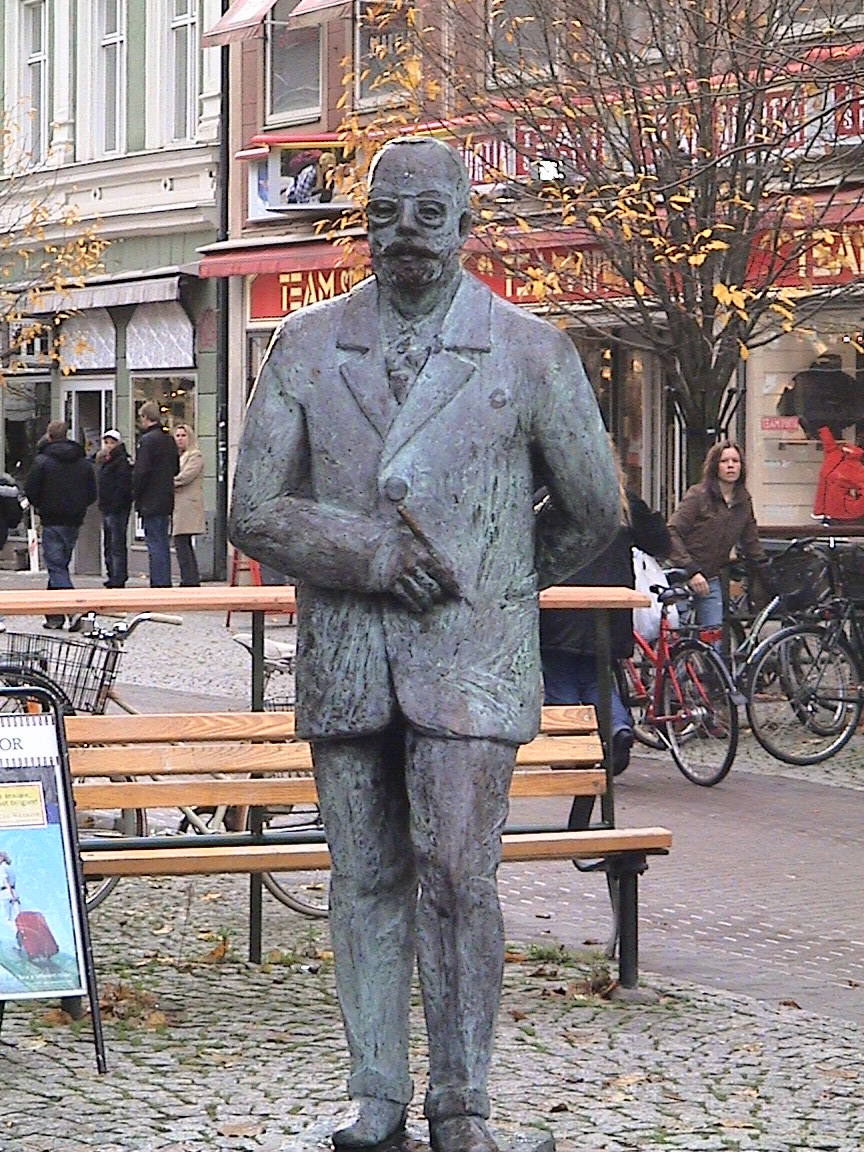
A statue of Gustaf Fröding in Karlstad.

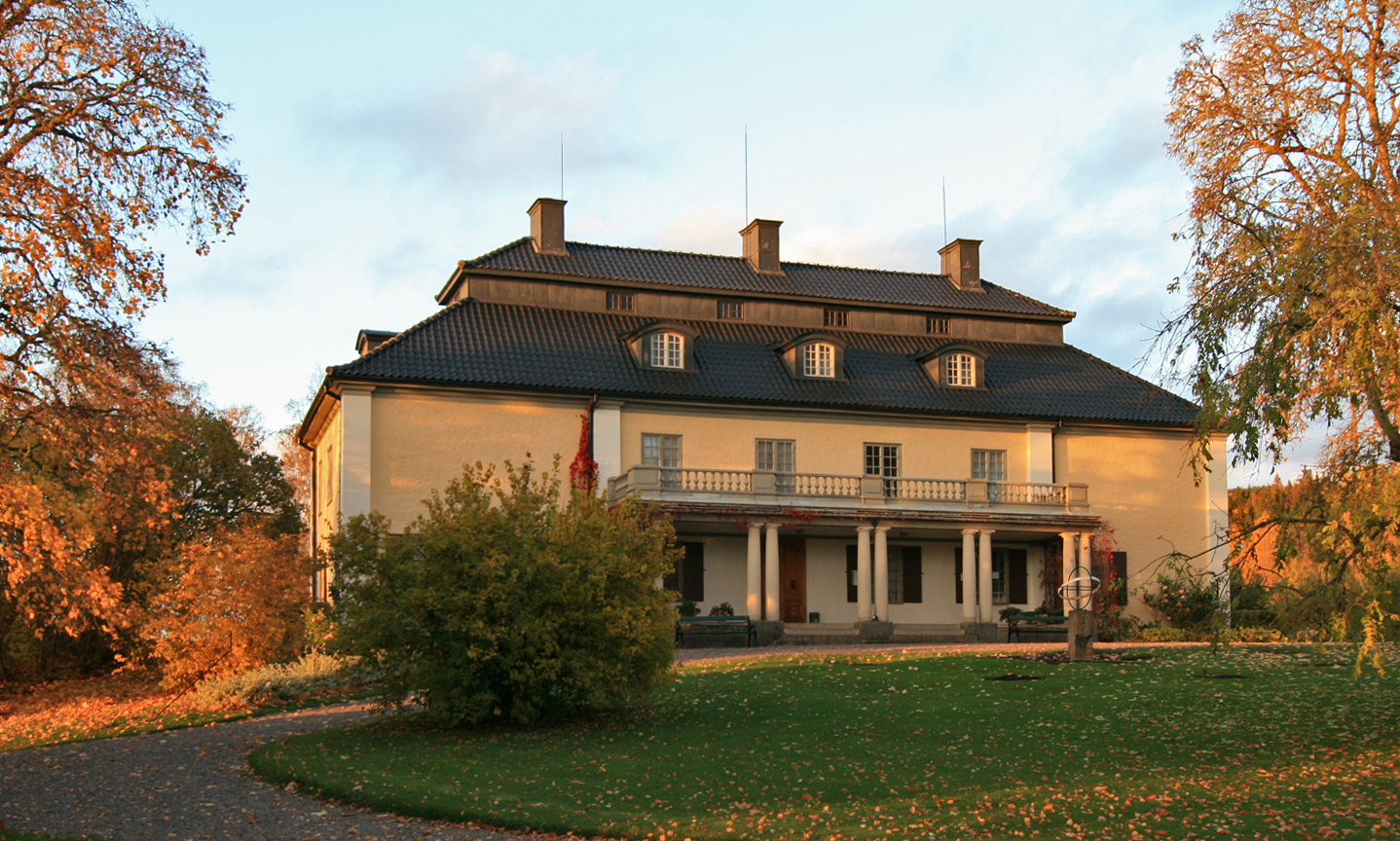
Selma Lagerlöf's residence Mårbacka in Sunne.

The province has powerful literary and musical traditions and has spawned some of the most well-known and loved authors of Sweden. In the 19th century several leading authors had their origin here, and retained links to Värmland, among them Erik Gustaf Geijer, Esaias Tegnér, Gustaf Fröding and Nobel Prize winner Selma Lagerlöf. Lagerlöf's novel, Gösta Berlings Saga, is a neo-romantic saga that takes place in Värmland in the 1820s and 1830s. It was also made into a film starring Greta Garbo. It was also made into an opera, I cavalieri di Ekebù, by Italian composer Riccardo Zandonai in 1925.

Education, theatre and a somewhat glamorous lifestyle were buoyed by the landed gentry and the wealth being generated through a lively local iron trade, and also by the position of the landscape on the edge between civilization and wilderness, which inspired art, literature and folklore. During the second half of the 19th century, the iron processing industry was largely put out of business by the revolution in the steel industry which made Central Europe and the United States vastly superior in this field, and the overall economic crisis throughout Europe of the 1870s and 1880s, and the subsequent emigration to North America, shook the landscape. The consequence, however, was to make authors like Lagerlöf and Fröding more aware of the heritage of their province, and they both drew on what they felt to be an oral tradition of story-telling and local legends. This emphasis on richly textured, often romantic or burlesque tales which nonetheless transcend the local has remained a focus of later writers, such as Göran Tunström (1937–2000) and Lars Andersson (b. 1954).

The musical traditions have inspired a number of prominent musicians, such as singers Zarah Leander, Monica Zetterlund and Rigmor Gustafsson.

== Sports ==
=== Ice hockey ===
Ice hockey is a popular sport in Värmland. The two most prominent teams in recent years are Färjestads BK from Karlstad and BIK Karlskoga from Karlskoga. Färjestad BK is the most successful team in the Swedish Hockey League (SHL). The team has won 10 Swedish championships since the introduction of the SHL in 1975. BIK Karlskoga plays in the second tier HockeyAllsvenskan. Other notable teams from province are Forshaga IF from Forshaga and Grums IK from Grums. The two teams played alternately in the top tier of Swedish ice hockey between the 1940s and 1960s. Between 1956 and 1961, both teams were simultaneously represented in the top tier.

=== Football ===
Football in the province is administered by Värmlands Fotbollförbund. The two most prominent teams in recent years are Degerfors IF from Degerfors and Mallbackens IF Sunne from Lysvik, north of Sunne. Degerfors IF was founded in 1907. Team made its first appearances in the top tier Allsvenskan in 1938. Degerfors IF achieved its greatest success in 1993 when the team won Svenska Cupen and qualified for play in the 1993–94 European Cup Winners' Cup. Mallbackens IF Sunne has played 14 seasons in the women's top tier Damallsvenskan. Other notable teams are QBIK from Karlstad, IF Karlstad Fotboll from Karlstad, Nordvärmlands FF from Ambjörby and FBK Karlstad from Karlstad.

=== Winter sports ===
There are several larger locations for winter sports in Värmland:

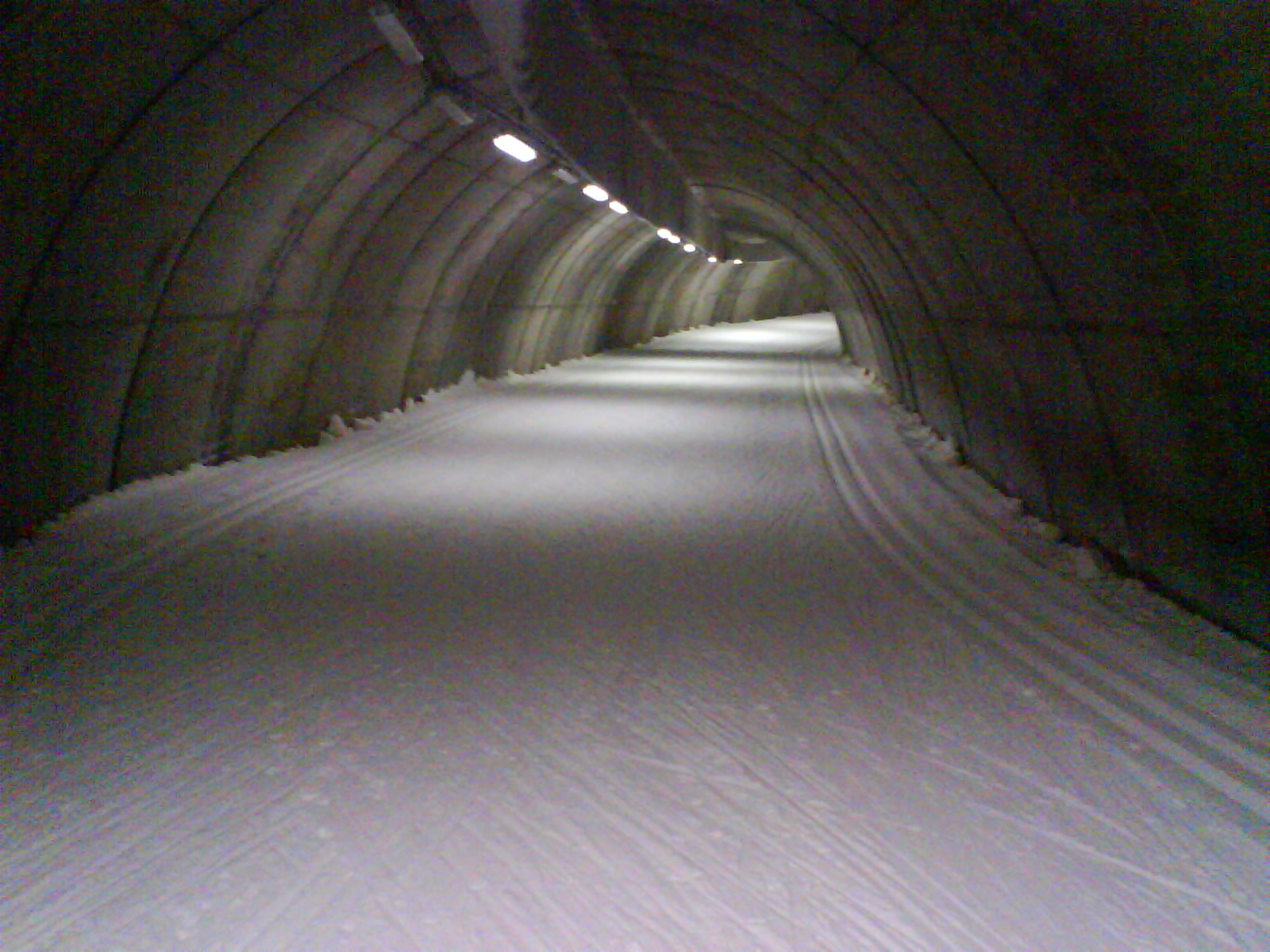
Torsby Ski Tunnel in 2009.

- Torsby is home to the Torsby Ski Tunnel and Sports Center. Torsby Ski Tunnel and Sports Center is a complete indoor and outdoor training facility. The ski tunnel was inaugurated in 2006 and is the first ski tunnel in Sweden. The ski tunnel has a length of 1.3 kilometers, but skiing is possible in both directions, which gives a total length of around 2.5 kilometers. At its inauguration, the ski tunnel was the longest ski tunnel in the world. The indoor facility also houses the first indoor shooting range for biathlon in Sweden. The facility also has a complete test center. The outdoor facility includes several trails for cross-country skiing, additional shooting ranges for biathlon, and a ski slope for alpine skiing. In total, there are up to 50 kilometers cross-country skiing trails in the area. Torsby Ski Tunnel and Sports Center is an official partner of the national cross-country skiing team of Sweden. The facility is regularly used by elite and national team athletes from Sweden and other countries. Torsby Ski Tunnel and Sports Center is an official Vasaloppet Centre. Directly adjacent to the facility is Torsby Sports hotel. The larger Valbergsängen Sports Hotel is also located in the area. Torsby Ski Tunnel and Sports Center is located next to Torsby Airport, with scheduled flights to and from Stockholm Arlanda Airport.
- Torsby is also home to Stjerneskolan upper secondary school, which specializes in sports. The school has sports programmes specialized in, among other things, cross-country skiing, biathlon and alpine skiing. The programmes in cross-country skiing and biathlon are graded as national sports gymnasiums (RIG). Notable alumnus of the school includes the Swedish former cross-country skier Gunde Svan, Swedish biathlete and former cross-country skier Stina Nilsson and Swedish cross-country skier Linn Persson.
- Mattila holiday village is located in Finnskogen northwest of Torsby. The village stems from a former Finnish settlement dating back to the 1640s. Mattila offers an extensive system of cross-country skiing trails. The trails measures up to 170 kilometers in total. Some trails extend all the way into Norway. The trails are groomed by the same grooming machine that was used for the FIS Nordic World Ski Championships in Falun. The cross-country skiing competition Mattila Ski Marathon is held annually in Mattila. The competition is a seeding competition for Vasaloppet.
- The Långberget cross-country skiing facility is located north of Sysslebäck in northern Värmland. The facility is 630 metes above sea level. The facility offers up to 63 kilometers of cross-country skiing trails and a smaller ski slope for alpine skiing, as well as a sports hotel and hostel. The Långberget cross-country skiing facility is an official Vasaloppet Centre.
- The sports facility Kalhyttan is located in Filipstad in eastern Värmland. The facility includes a multi-sport arena and an artificial snow facility. Kalhyttan has one of the most modern artificial snow systems in Sweden. The facility offers a total of 40 kilometers of cross-country skiing trails, including a 4 kilometer long cross-country skiing trail with artificial snow. Kalhyttan has been the venue for the Swedish Skiing Championship ten times.

There are several ski resorts in Värmland:

- Branäs ski resort is located near Dalby in northern Vämland. Branäs is the largest ski resort in Värmland and the fourth largest ski resort in Sweden. The facility includes 33 slopes for alpine skiing, 30 lifts, including a gondola, a total of 29 kilometers of cross-country skiing trails and a ski cross course, as of 2024. The facility has a lift-served vertical drop of 415 meters. The two longest runs are 3 kilometers each.
- Hovfjället ski resort is located outside Torsby. The ski resort is 542 meters above sea level. The facility includes 13 slopes for alpine skiing, six lifts, and a total of 22 kilometers of cross-country skiing trails. The ski resort has been in use since the 1960s.
- Valfjället Skicenter is located near Gryttved, west of Åmotfors in western Värmland. The facility includes 12 slopes for alpine skiing, five lifts and several trails for cross-country skiing. With a vertical drop of 220 metres, the ski facility has one of southern Sweden's highest vertical drop. The longest run is 1.8 kilometers.
- The ski resort Ski Sunne (also known as Finnfallet) is located outside Sunne. The facility includes 10 slopes for alpine skiing and seven lifts (including two chairlifts). Ski Sunne has a drop height of 265 metres. The longest run is 1,8 kilometes. Ski Sunne is operated and used by the slalom skiing club Sunne Alpina Klubb.
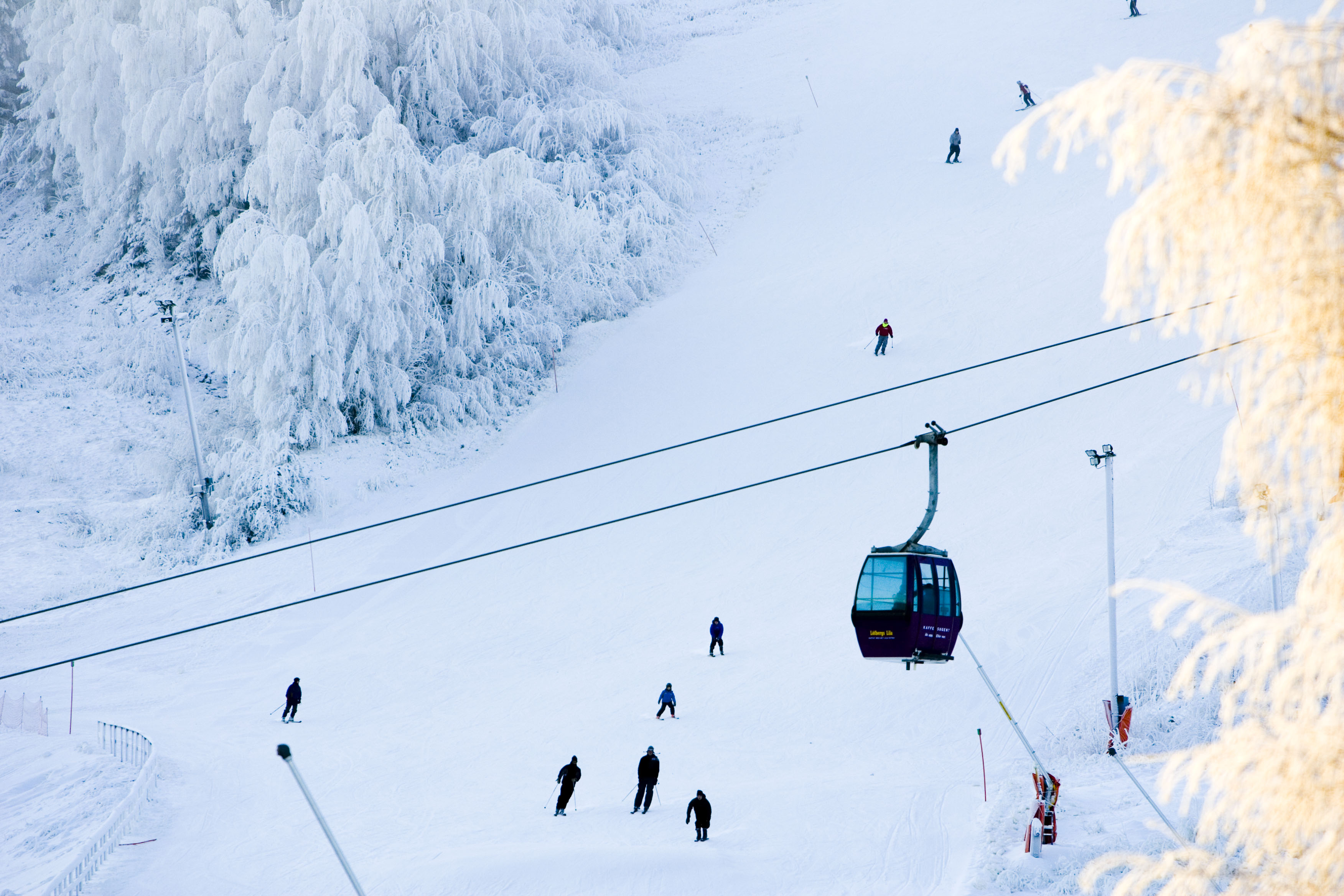
Branäs ski resort.

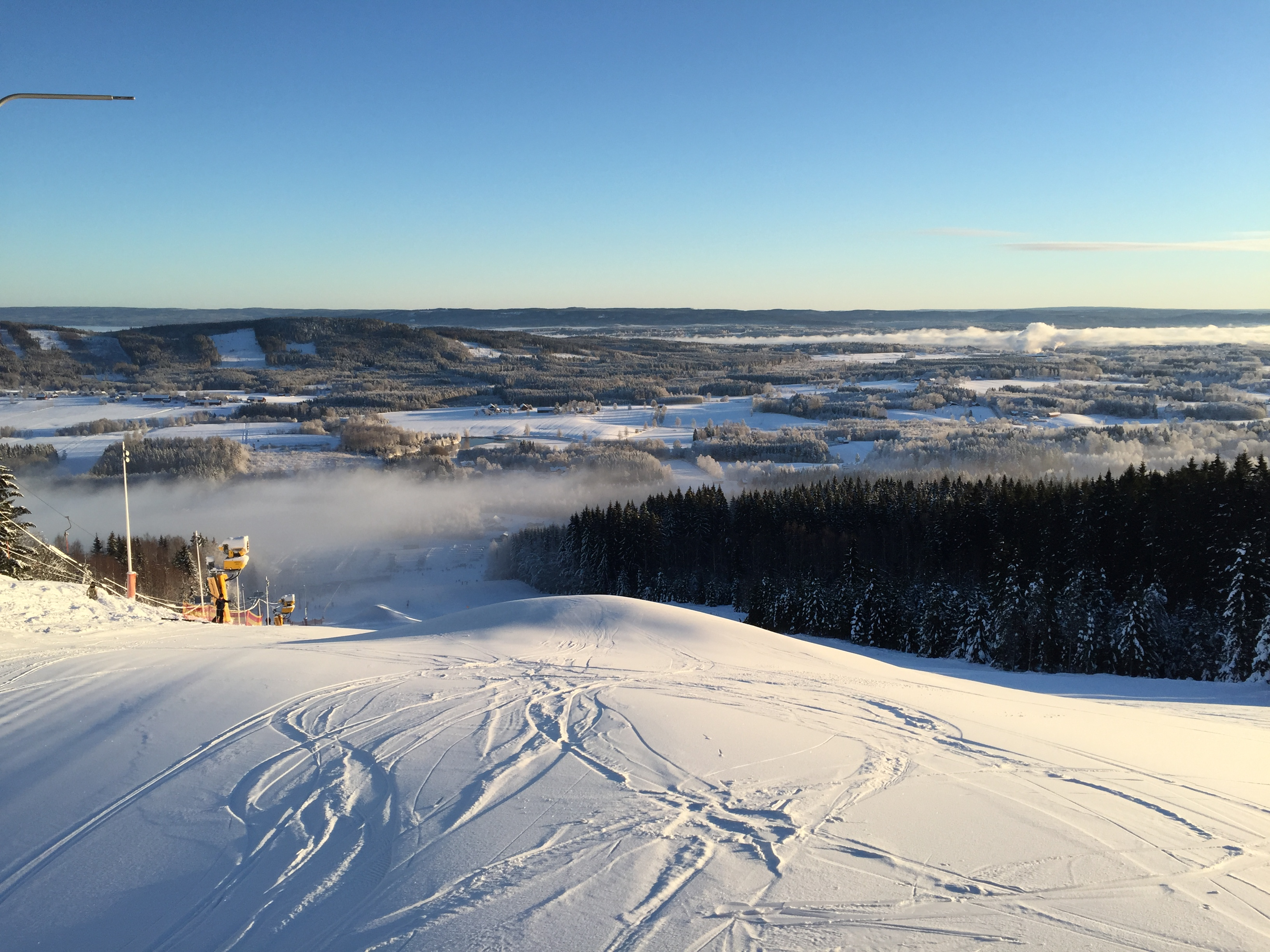
View from the top of the slope in Ski Sunne.

=== Motor sports ===
Värmland is the site of the Höljesbanan rallycross circuit in Höljes. Höljesbanan annually hosts the Swedish round of the European and World Rallycross championships. The province also hosted the Rally Sweden rally competition for many years. However, the event was relocated north to Umeå in 2022.

== Notable natives ==
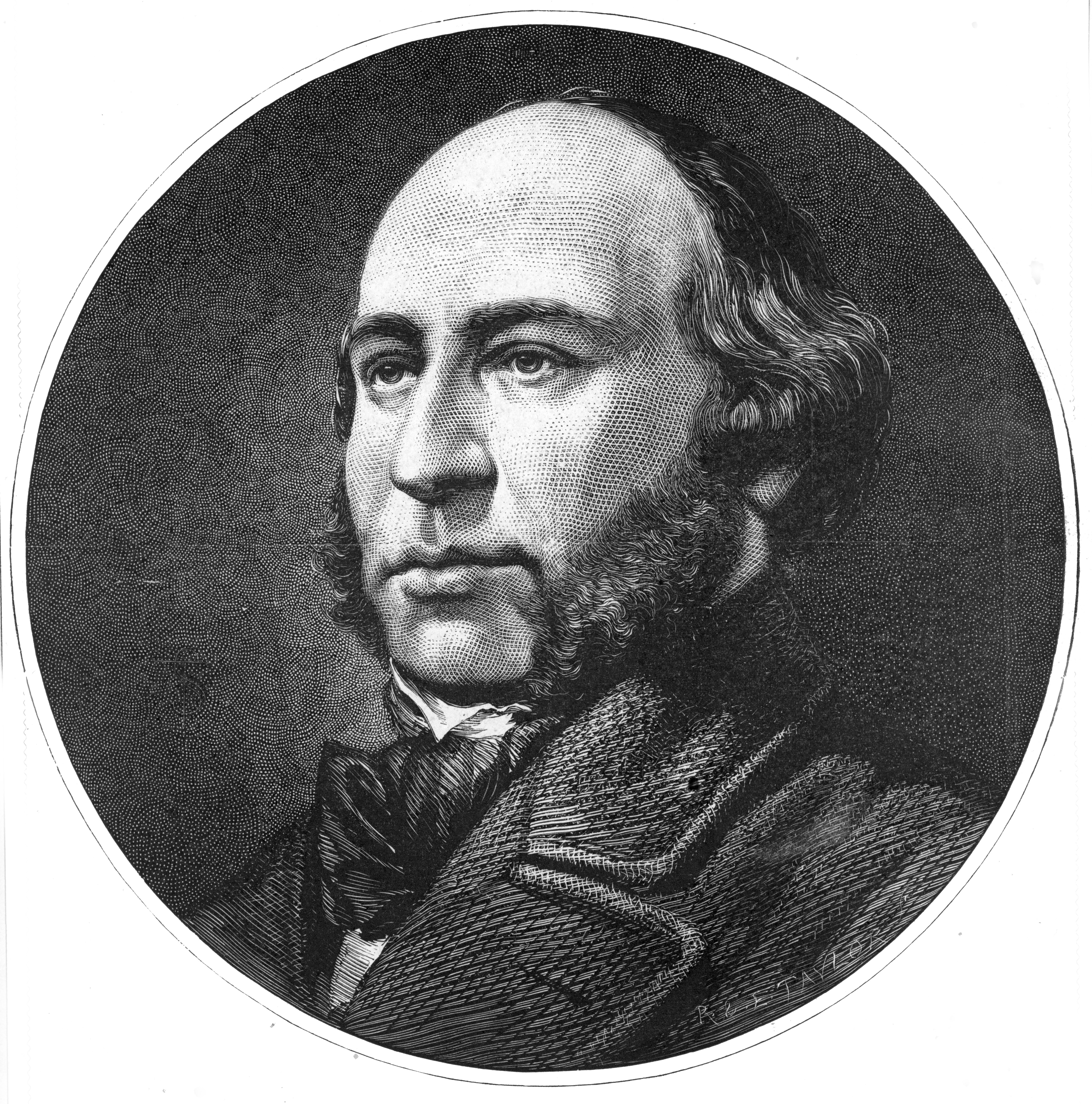
John Ericsson, 1878

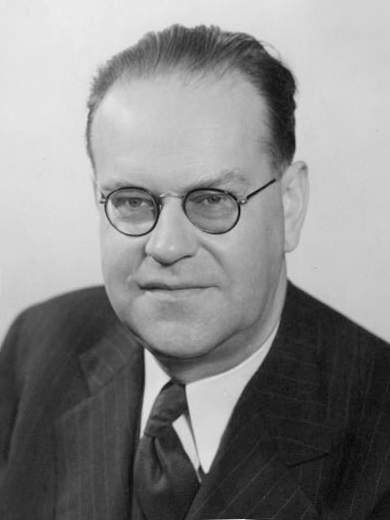
Tage Erlander, 1949

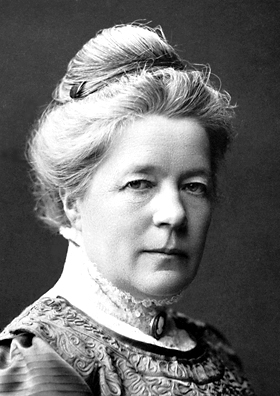
Selma Lagerlöf, 1909

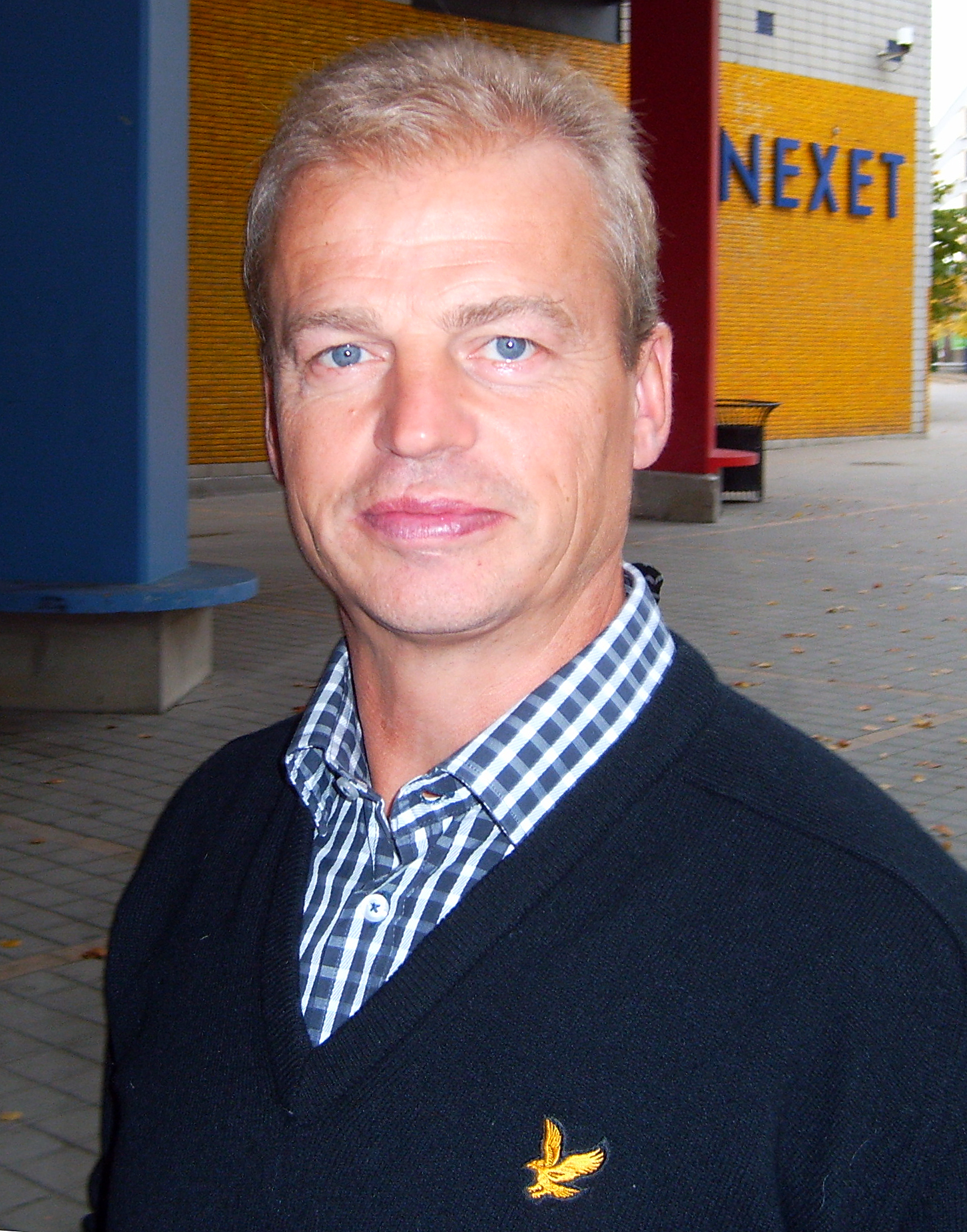
Bengt-Åke Gustafsson, 2008

- Adam Alsing, (1968 in Karlstad – 2020) TV and radio presenter
- Johanna Anderson, (1856—1904) Baptist missionary in Burma
- Adolph Olson Eberhart, (1870 in Kil – 1944), Swedish-American Governor of Minnesota
- August Hjalmar Edgren (1840 in Östanås – 1903), Swedish-American linguistics professor
- John Alexis Edgren (1839 in Östanås – 1908), Swedish-American Minister
- Nils Ericson (1802 in Langbanshyttan – 1870), inventor and mechanical engineer
- John Ericsson (1803 in Langbanshyttan – 1889), inventor and mechanical engineer.
- Lars Magnus Ericsson, (1846 in Värmskog – 1926) inventor, founder of Ericsson
- Tage Erlander, (1901 in Ransäter – 1985) Prime Minister of Sweden, 1946-1969
- Nils Ferlin, (1898 in Karlstad - 1961) poet and lyricist.
- Gustaf Fröding, (1860 in Alster – 1911) poet and writer
- Erik Gustaf Geijer, (1783 in Ransäter – 1847) writer, historian, poet, philosopher and composer.
- Göran Hägglund, (born 1959 in Degerfors) Minister for Social Affairs, 2006-2014
- Selma Lagerlöf, (1858 in Mårbacka – 1940) author and teacher
- Zarah Leander, (1907 in Karlstad – 1981) singer and actress
- Bruce Magnuson, (1909–1995) former leader of the Communist Party of Canada
- Oscar F. Mossberg, (1866–1937) Swedish-American manufacture of firearms, co-founder of O.F. Mossberg & Sons
- Adolf Noreen, (1854 in Östra Ämtervik – 1925) linguist
- Harry Nyquist, (1889 in Filsby – 1976) physicist and electronic engineer
- Victor Sjöström, (1879 in Årjäng – 1960) film director, screen writer and actor
- Mia Skäringer, (born 1976 in Kristinehamn) actress and comedian
- Esaias Tegnér (1782 in Kyrkerud – 1846) writer, professor of the Greek language and bishop.
- Sten Tolgfors, (born 1966 in Forshaga) arms lobbyist and former Minister for Defence
- Göran Tunström, (1937 in Borgvik – 2000) author.
- Östen Undén, (1886 in Karlstad – 1974) Minister for Foreign Affairs, 1924–1926 and 1945–1962
- Monica Zetterlund, (1937 in Hagfors – 2005) jazz singer and actress.

=== Sport ===
- Gunnar Andersson, (1928 in Arvika – 1969) former footballer, famous in Olympique de Marseille
- Marcus Berg, (born 1986 in Torsby) former football player
- Andreas Bergwall, (born 1974) bandy goalkeeper
- Kenny Bräck, (born 1966 in Arvika) former race car driver, 1999 Indy 500 Winner
- Sven-Göran Eriksson, (born 1948 in Sunne – 2024) football coach, former England head coach
- Bengt-Åke Gustafsson, (born 1958 in Karlskoga) former ice hockey player and head coach of Sweden men's national ice hockey team
- Stefan Holm, (born 1976 in Forshaga) former high jumper, gold medallist at the 2004 Summer Olympics
- Willy Lindström, (born 1951 in Grums) former ice hockey player and twice winner of Stanley Cup
- Lina Länsberg, (born 1982 in Karlstad) mixed martial artist and twice IFMA gold medalist
- Ulf Sterner, (born 1951 in Deje), former ice hockey player
- Ola Toivonen, (born 1986 in Degerfors) former football player
- Thomas Wassberg, (born 1956 in Lennartsfors) former cross-country skier, four times Olympic gold medallist
