= Johanna Anderson =

Swedish-American missionary

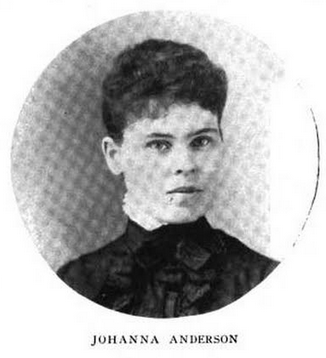
Johanna Anderson, from a 1905 publication.

Johanna Anderson (October 2, 1856 — December 1, 1904) was a missionary in Burma, the first missionary sent abroad from the Swedish Baptist Church in America.

== Early life ==
Johanna P. Anderson was born in Värmland, Sweden, the daughter of Anders Andersson and Margaretta Christina Larsdotter Andersson. She moved to the United States as a child, with her parents, who settled in a Swedish-immigrant community in Moorhead, Minnesota.

== Career ==
Anderson became the first Swedish Baptist missionary in 1888, when she sailed to work in Toungoo, teaching Bghai Karen children and overseeing local teachers at a school in Burma. She described her work, and Burmese people and customs, in writings for American publications. She was sponsored by the Woman's Baptist Foreign Missionary Society of the West. She was back in the United States on furlough for health reasons from 1897 to 1900, giving lectures to support mission work. She returned to Burma in 1903, stationed at Loikaw, where she died the following year.

== Personal life ==
Anderson died in Burma in 1904, aged 47 years.
