= Hagfors Airport =

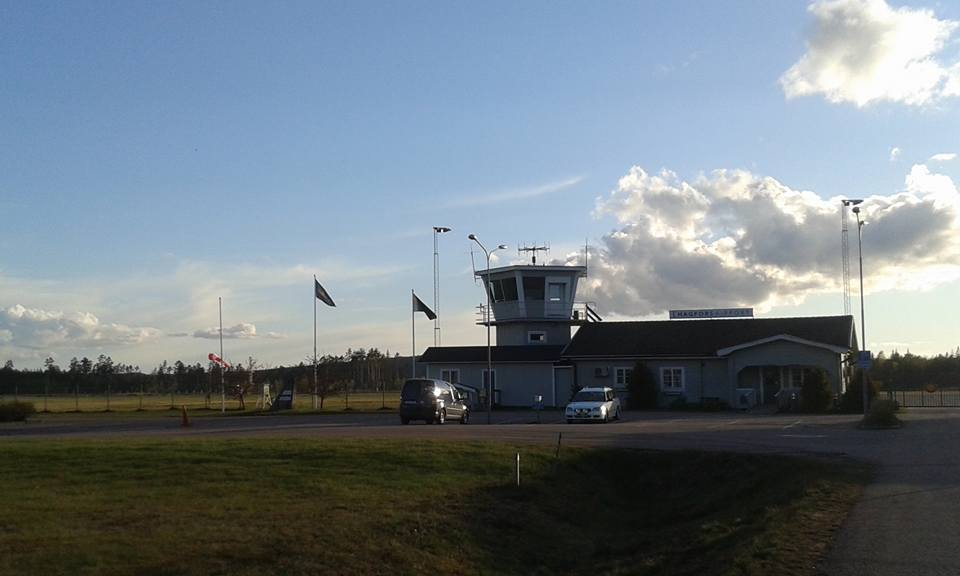
- IATA: HFS; ICAO: ESOH

Summary
- Airport type: Public
- Operator: Municipality of Hagfors
- Location: Hagfors
- Coordinates: 60°1′30″N 13°34′50″E
- Website: www.hagfors.se/invanare/hagfors-flygplats

Map

Runways
Direction	Length		Surface
Direction	m	ft	Surface
18/36	1,510	4,954	Asphalt

Statistics (2016)
- Passengers total: 2,865
- Domestic passengers: 2,841
- International passengers: 24

Hagfors Airport (IATA: HFS, ICAO: ESOH) is an airport near Hagfors, Värmland County, Sweden. The airport is served by a single route operated under public service obligation. It saw 2406 passengers In 2014.

== Airlines and destinations ==
The following airlines operate regular scheduled and charter flights at Hagfors Airport:

Airlines	Destinations
Jonair	Stockholm–Arlanda, Torsby
