= Indoor skiing =

Sport discipline

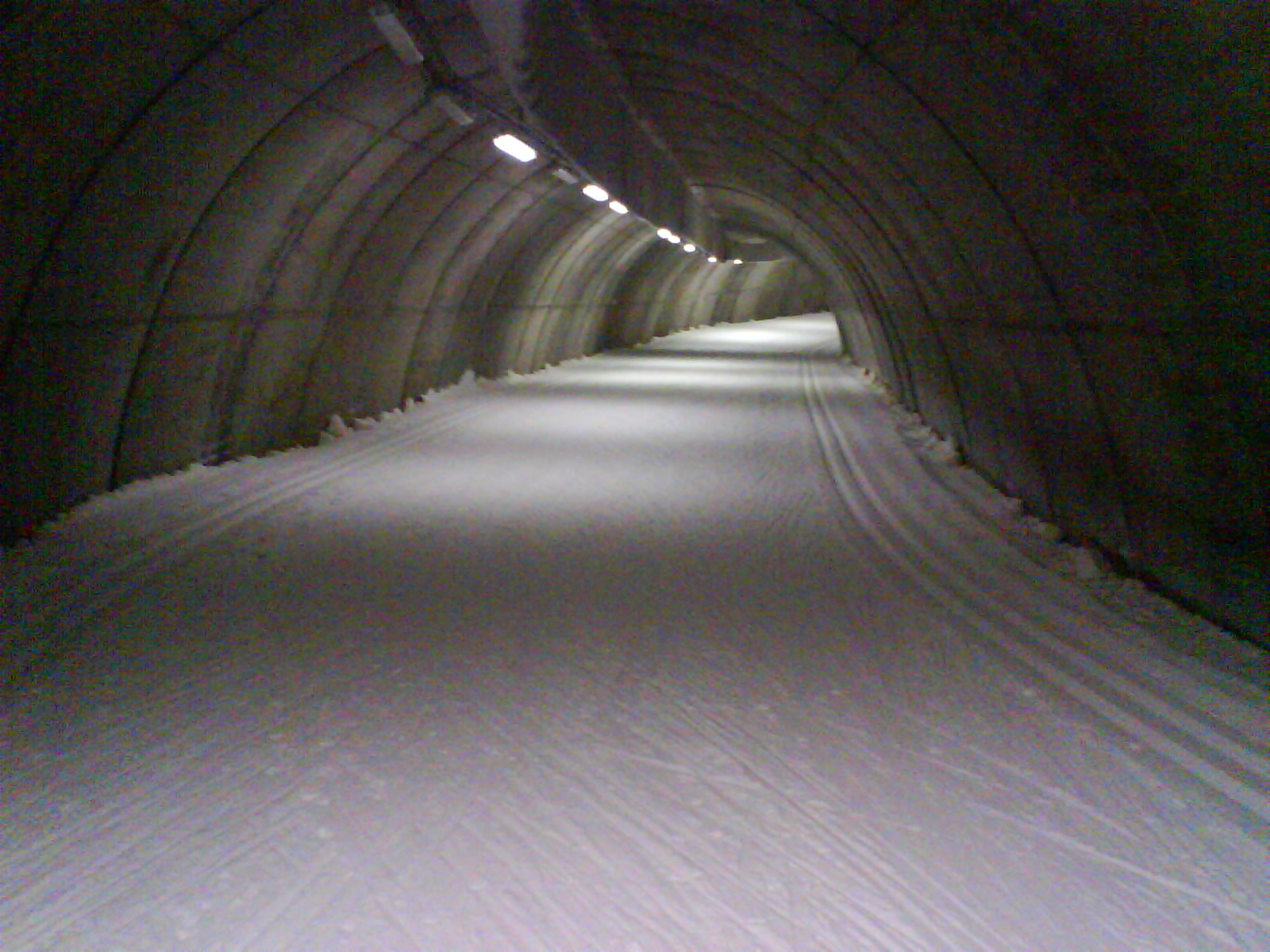
Fortum Ski Tunnel in Torsby, Sweden

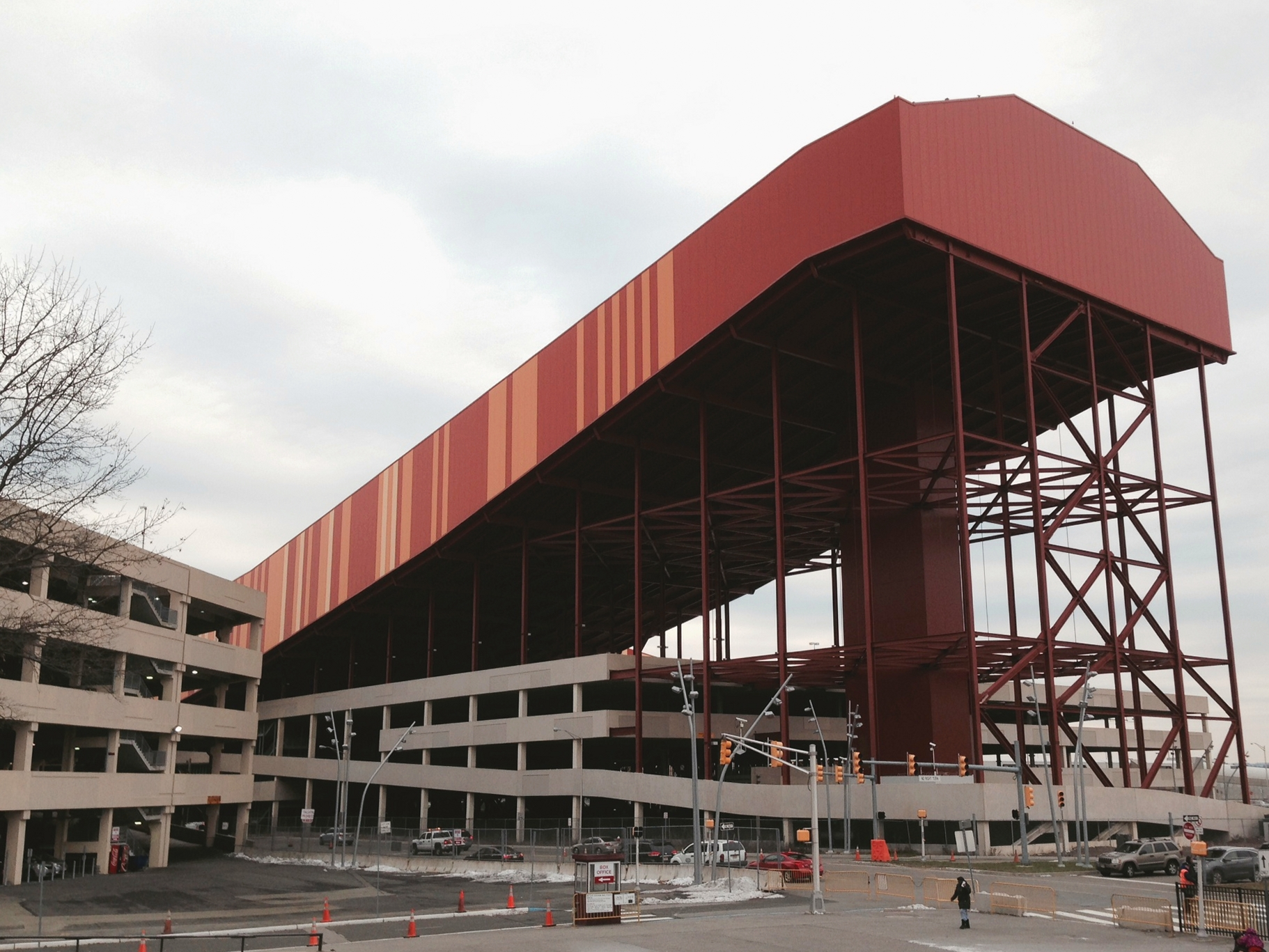
Exterior view of the under construction ski slope of the American Dream Meadowlands retail and entertainment complex in East Rutherford, New Jersey in 2014

Indoor skiing is done in a climate-controlled environment with artificially produced snow. This enables skiing and snowboarding to take place regardless of outdoor temperatures. Facilities for both alpine skiing and Nordic skiing are available.

== History ==
Since the early 20th century, there have been four major stages in the evolution of indoor snow centres.

Firstly, centres that had no refrigeration and used an artificial mixture of materials to create a surface substance something like snow, the first of these opened in Austria and Germany in the 1920s. The first recorded indoor “snow” slope was created at Berlin’s Automobilhalle in April 1927 gaining worldwide attention. According to contemporary reports a wooden slope was created about 720 feet long and sixty feet wide.

The "snow" substitute used was invented and later patented by a British diplomat, L. C. Ayscough, and involved a mixture of powdered mica, soda crystals and sawdust spread on a brush matting surface. The Berlin government were concerned about health risks from the mixture and commissioned the then head of its Municipal Health Bureau, Dr. Wilhelm von Drigalkski, to check it was safe for public use. He confirmed that it was and an order for 200 tons of the material to be delivered by train was placed.

The slope was initially popular and a company was founded to build more slopes in Dresden, Munich, and Frankfurt. It is not known if these were ever created.

A second indoor centre using "Ayscough snow", planned to be a more permanent facility, opened in Austria in November 1927. Known as Schneepalast (German: Snow Palace), it was opened in the Austrian capital Vienna in the abandoned Vienna Northwest Railway Station established by the Norwegian ski jumper Dagfinn Carlsen. The track in the 3,000-square-metre (32,000 sq ft) ski area was built on a wooden ramp. A ski jump made it possible to jump up to 20 metres (66 ft). Skiers had to walk up the artificial mountain, because there was no ski lift. However, sledges could be pulled up with an electrically operated system. The artificial snow had been made by the English experimenter James Ayscough from soda.

After the initial excitement enthusiasm for "Ayscough snow" rapidly waned however as users decided it was not particularly slippery and the initial whiteness rapidly discoloured. The Vienna facility closed in May 1928.

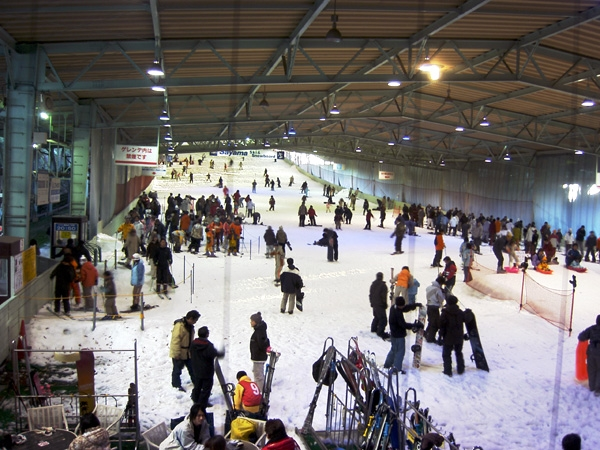
Sayama Ski Resort

The second attempt at indoor snow centres came three decades later with the first centre that used real snow or crushed ice which was transported inside to a slope covered by a roof and open to urban skiers during cold months of the year in the city of Sayama, Japan. This centre opened in 1959 and continues to operate, although now with on-site snowmaking rather than bringing in snow by lorry.

Thirdly came the first generation of refrigerated indoor centres which used either a chemical mixture to simulate snow or scraped ice. The first three of these opened in 1988, each claiming to be the first in the world. These were Mt Thebarton in Adelaide, Australia, Casablanca in Belgium, and Ski in Tsudanuma in Japan.

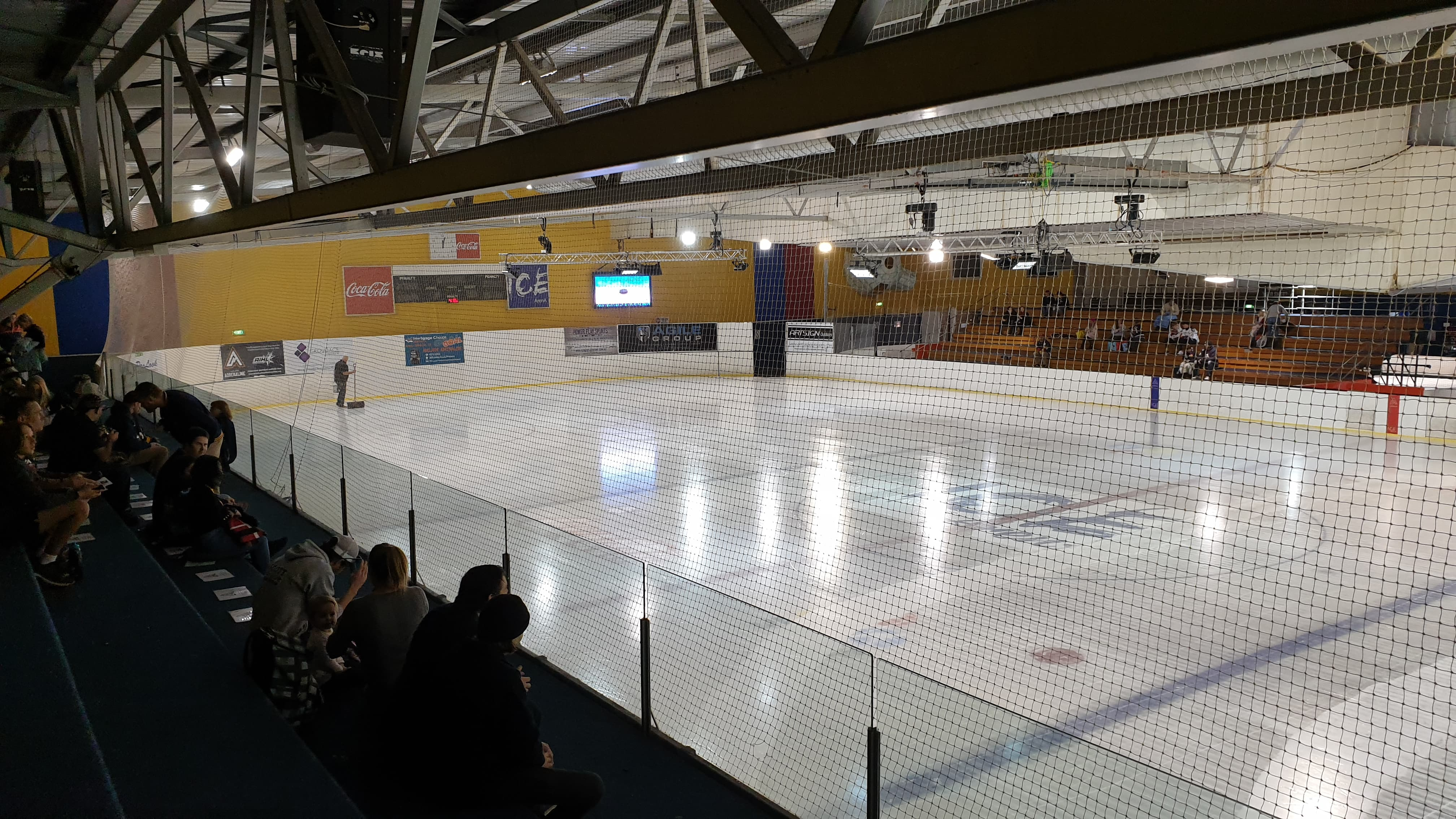
Some ski halls form parts of larger wintersports centres - above is the ice hockey rink at MtTheBarton (now Ice Arena), Adelaide

The fourth and current stage of indoor snow centre development came when centres which used ‘real snow’, made by snow-making machines, with no chemical additives, began to appear. These are now the norm for most of the 140 centres that have been built since the first, which was The Snowdome at Tamworth in the UK which opened in May 1994.

=== Present Day ===
Since the first indoor snow centre was built in Berlin in 1926, 149 indoor snow centres have been operated, most of them since 1990. 113 are currently operational in 35 countries on 6 continents.

Most offer skiing and snowboarding but some, primarily in sub-tropical areas in southeast Asia that do not normally see natural snowfall, exist as snow experience centres offering activities like sledging, snowman building and snowball fights.

The number of centres being built continues to grow and 2019 saw more indoor snow centres open worldwide than any other year. Analysis of the last three decades of indoor snow centre construction saw 2010-19 had the most indoor snow centres built (60), up from 43 between 2000 and 2009 and 34 built in the 1990s.

Asia (especially China) saw the most-new indoor snow centres built since 2010, as it did in the 1990s (back then most were built in Japan). Between those two decades Europe built the most facilities in the first decade of this century. The past decade saw the first indoor snow centres open in Africa (Egypt), North America (USA) and South America (Brazil).

Three of the five-biggest indoor snow centres in the world, including two with 50,000sqm+ (500,000+ square feet) indoor snow space, opened in a 12 month period from March 2019 to March 2020.

Many of the indoor snow centres built in recent years are in China which has 34 centres, almost five times more than the next closest country (The Netherlands, with seven). China’s SUNAC group has become the world’s largest operator of indoor snow centres, operating seven centres, including the world’s three largest. Two more are under construction, most of these opened in 2019-20.

== List of Alpine ski halls by country ==
=== Australia ===
- Mt Thebarton Snow and Ice, Adelaide. Operated from 1987 to 2005. Built in a state without any ski resorts, it was probably the world's first indoor ski slope on artificial snow.
- Swiss Pavilion at World Expo 88, Brisbane. Two lifts operated for six months. Included a ski slope on artificial snow serviced by a handle tow and a double chairlift operating on a rectangular route.

=== Belgium ===
- SnowWorld Antwerpen, Antwerp
- Ice Mountain, Comines-Warneton
- Snow Valley, Peer

=== Brazil ===
- Snowland, Gramado

=== China ===
- SHENZHEN huafa, located in Shenzhen, world's largest indoor ski resort with a total 430,000 m^{2} (4,600,000 sq ft) of area.
- L*SNOW Indoor Skiing Theme Resort located in Pudong, Shanghai, world's largest indoor ski resort until 2025, with a total campus area of 350,000 square metres (3,800,000 sq ft) as recognized by Guinness World Records.
- Harbin Wanda Indoor Ski and Winter Sports Resort located in Harbin, Heilongjiang, was world's largest indoor ski resort with 72,600 m^{2} (781,000 sq ft) of indoor snow.
- Bonski Snow Park, Guangzhou
- Sunac Snow Park, Wuxi
- Sunac Snow Park, Kunming
- Sunac Snow Park, Chengdu
- Sunac Snow Park, Chongqing

=== France ===
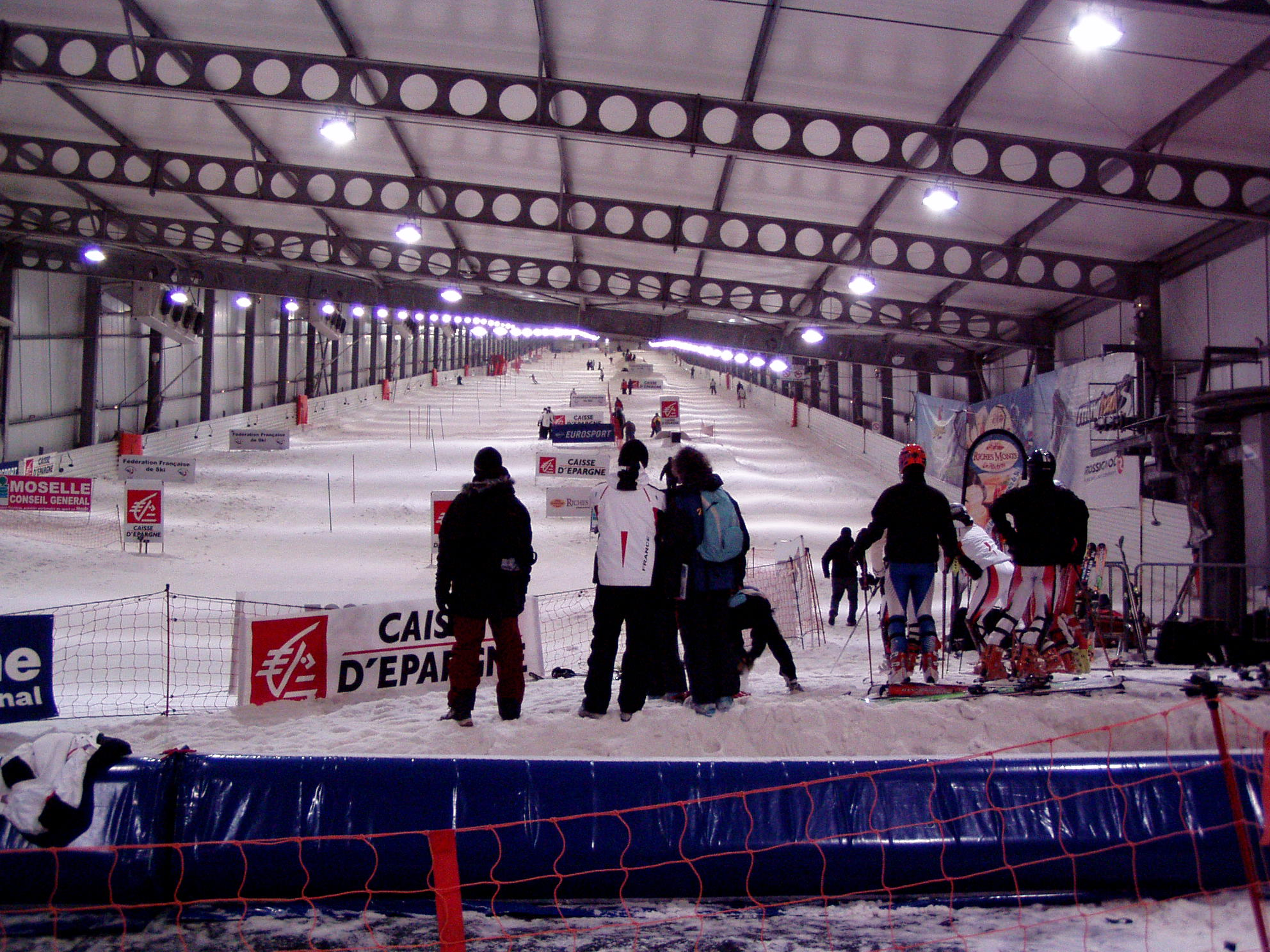
SnowWorld Amnéville, Moselle, France

- SnowWorld Amnéville, Moselle, France — French Wikipedia article.

=== Germany ===
- alpincenter BOTTROP, Munster
- SnowDome Bispingen, Lower Saxony
- SnowTropolis, Brandenburg
- Alpenpark Neuss, Dusseldorf
- alpincenter Hamburg-Wittenburg, Hamburg

=== Indonesia ===
- Trans Snow World, Bekasi
- Trans Snow World, Banten
- Trans Snow World, Suburabaya
- Trans Snow World, Makassar

=== Japan ===
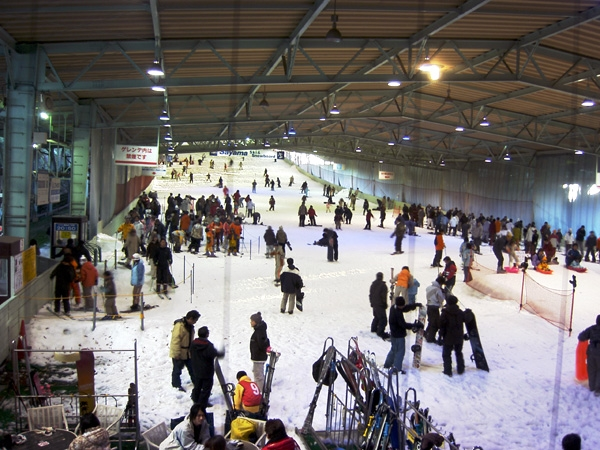
Sayama Ski Resort

- Sayama Ski Resort, Saitama, Japan

=== Lithuania ===
- Snow Arena, Druskininkai

=== Netherlands ===
- SnowWorld, Landgraaf with a total of 35,000 m^{2} (380,000 sq ft) of snow. In 2003, the first indoor snowboard FIS WorldCup contest was held here.
- SnowWorld, Zoetermeer
- SnowWorld, Rucphen
- SnowWorld, Terneuzen
- De Uithof, The Hague
- SnowWorld, Amsterdam
- Montana Snowcenter, Westerhoven

=== New Zealand ===
- Snowplanet, Auckland

=== Norway ===
- SNØ, Lørenskog with a total of 50,000 m^{2} (540,000 sq ft). Has a 505-metre-long (1,657 ft) alpine ski track and a one-kilometre-long (0.62 mi) cross-country skiing track suspended from the roof. One-of-a-kind combination of these winter sports. Opened January 2020.

=== Spain ===
- SnowZone, in Madrid, has 18,000 m^{2} (190,000 sq ft) of snow areas, including a 250 m × 50 m (820 ft × 160 ft) slope (over 25% grade), a 100 m × 40 m (330 ft × 130 ft) slope, chairlifts, and other winter sports facilities.

=== United Arab Emirates ===
- Ski Dubai, Mall of the Emirates, Dubai: A 22,500 m^{2} (242,000 sq ft) area covered with real snow throughout the year. The temperature is maintained at −2 °C (28 °F) with capacity of 1,500 visitors.

=== Russia ===
- Snejcom, Moscow has 24,000 m^{2} (260,000 sq ft), a slope of 365 m × 60 m (1,198 ft × 197 ft). Closed in 2022.

=== Egypt ===
- Ski Egypt, Mall of Egypt, 6th of October. It has the only indoor ski slope in Africa with the main slope being 210 m (690 ft) long.

=== United Kingdom ===
- Chill Factore, 6.4 km (4 mi) outside Manchester, with a 180-metre-long (590 ft) main slope.
- Snowzone Castleford, near Leeds with a 170-metre-long (560 ft) main slope.
- Xscape Milton Keynes, in Central Milton Keynes with a 170-metre-long (560 ft) main slope.
- Snowdome at Tamworth, near Birmingham with a 170-metre-long (560 ft) slope and two smaller beginner areas 25 and 30 metres (82 and 98 ft) long.
- Snow Centre at Hemel Hempstead
- Snow Factor at Braehead Soar (permanently closed)

=== United States of America ===
- Big SNOW American Dream, American Dream Meadowlands (Meadowlands Sports Complex), East Rutherford, New Jersey (Opened on 5 December 2019)

== Nordic ski tunnels (Cross-country skiing) ==
Location	Name	Length	Opened
(Finland) Sotkamo	DNA Ski Tunnel	1,200 m (3,937 ft)	1997
(Finland) Jämijärvi	Jämi Ski Tunnel	1,250 m (4,101 ft)	2002
(Finland) Uusikaupunki	Vahterus Ring and Vahterus Ring II	1,000 m (3,281 ft)	Nov 2005
(Finland) Paimio	Ski Tunnel Paippi and Ski Tunnel Paippi II	700 m (2,297 ft)	before 2006
(Finland) Leppävirta	Vesileppis Ski Arena		before 2006
(Sweden) Torsby	Fortum Ski Tunnel Torsby	1,287 m (4,222 ft)	16 Jun 2006
(Germany) Oberhof	DKB Skisport-Halle Oberhof	1,754 m (5,755 ft)	24 Aug 2009
(Finland) Helsinki	Kivikko ski hall	1,100 m (3,609 ft)	1 Sep 2009
(Sweden) Gothenburg	Skidome	1,200 m	9 July 2015
(Slovenia) Planica	Planica Underground XC tunnel	800 m	2016
(Sweden) Gällö	Midsweden 365	1,400 m	23 Sep 2017
(China) Jilin	Beishan Indoor Ski Resort	1,308 m	2019
