= Monica Kristensen Solås =

Norwegian explorer (born 1950)

- Born: 30 June 1950 (age 75); Torsby
- Education: University of Tromsø
- Known for: Explorer and crime novelist

Monica Kristensen Solås (born 30 June 1950), is a Norwegian glaciologist, meteorologist, polar explorer and crime novelist. She was awarded a Founders Gold Medal by the Royal Geographical Society in 1989.

== Life ==
She was born in Torsby, Sweden, of Swedish/Norwegian parents, and moved as a child to Kongsvinger in Norway.

She is a physics graduate of the University of Tromsø, and has taken part in many expeditions to the Arctic and Antarctic. In the early 1980s, she completed a PhD at Scott Polar Research Institute on tabular Icebergs and published a paper in Nature (journal) from this work.

In 1986–1987 she was leader of an expedition to follow Roald Amundsen’s route to the South Pole, but was forced to turn back at 86 degrees south. She was awarded a Founders Gold Medal by the Royal Geographical Society in 1989.

In 1991-92 she led a glaciology and climate change expedition titled the Aurora Program and based on the Filchner Ice Shelf. There was a side mission to locate and recover the tent erected by Roald Amundsen at the South Pole (Polheim) in February 1992. After sailing from Montevideo, Uruguay on 12 December 1991, they eventually were able to establish a five-hut base named Blaenga (Norwegian for "blue field) at 77.5°S-34.2°W beginning on 2 January 1992. Construction was completed by 18 January, and local glaciological studies were conducted. The venture had been delayed by poor weather, sea ice conditions, and damage to the expedition's Twin Otter aircraft—it had to be flown back to Canada for repairs. This caused the original plans for the South Pole tent project to be significantly altered. They had planned to put 4 people at the South Pole–the first two, Niels Jensen and Peter Hansen, were to arrive in early January to do a GPS survey of the tent search area, and the second two, Ulf Hedman and Monica Kristensen, were to arrive in early February to conduct an aerial variable radar survey for the tent using the expedition's Twin Otter aircraft. Ultimately, Monica Kristensen and fellow glaciologist Heinrich Eggenfellner traversed 560 km south to the first aircraft fuel depot on the Recovery Glacier. After conducting additional glaciological studies, they were flown to the South Pole by the expedition Twin Otter on 16 February. They were only at the Pole for four hours, and their aircraft had not been equipped with survey gear. They were provided the use of a Spryte tracked vehicle, and they conducted a GPS survey to locate their estimated position of the tent to within 50 meters. They also detected a cavity in the snow near the presumed location of the tent. They pitched a tent at the presumed tent site and erected several flags including the Norwegian flag which was left flying after their departure.

A further expedition in late December 1993 set out with, among other aims, the intention of finding Amundsen’s tent at the South Pole, and to retrieve it for display at the 1994 Winter Olympic Games in Norway. This attempt, a traverse to the South Pole using snowmobiles, was abandoned 1,075 kilometers away from the Pole (81°23′S-14°4′W) when expedition member Jostein Helgestad was killed in a fall into a crevasse, and the remaining members of the team—Lars ole Ekerhovd, Per Haakon EikeBerg, Egil Isaksen—were rescued by an American search-and-rescue team and flown to the American South Pole base. Helgestad's body could not be recovered. Monica was not on that traverse—she may have already been at the South Pole or en route from Punta Arenas via Patriot Hills Base Camp by Adventure Network International (ANI) (now Antarctic Logistics & Expeditions). Isaksen, who had sustained concussion and bruising after falling into a crevasse, was flown to McMurdo with the rescue team, and thence to Christchurch, NZ for medical treatment by the National Science Foundation. The other Norwegian expedition members were picked up at the Pole by ANI and returned to Norway via Punta Arenas.

She later worked in northern Norway and on Svalbard, and in January 2004 she became general secretary of Redningsselskapet (Norsk Selskab til Skibbrudnes Redning – the Norwegian Society for Rescue at Sea), a post she held until November 2005.

Solås is the author of many books, including Mot 90 Grader Syd (Towards 90 Degrees South) (1987).
