= Torsby Airport =

Torsby Airport Torsby Flygplats
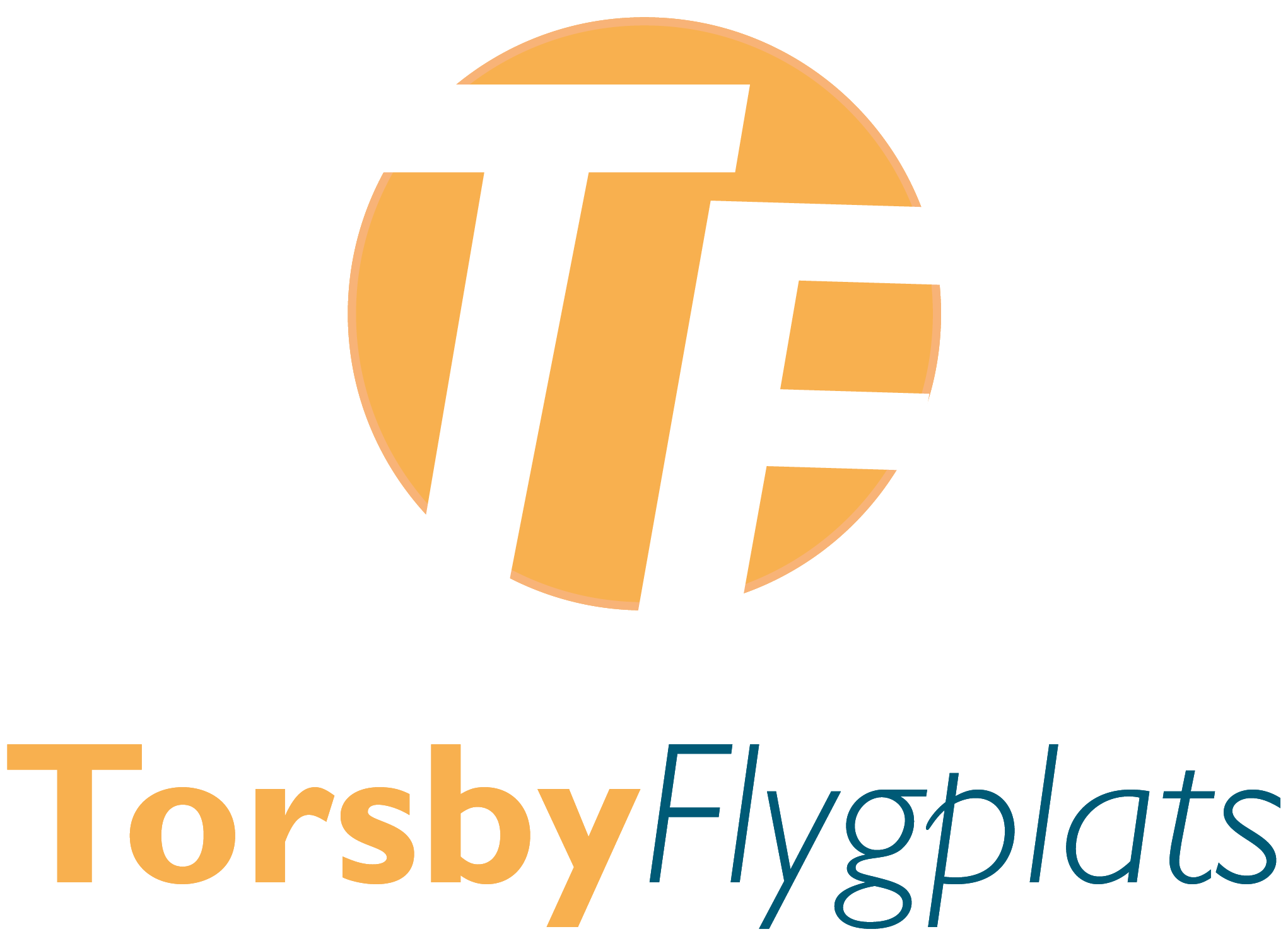

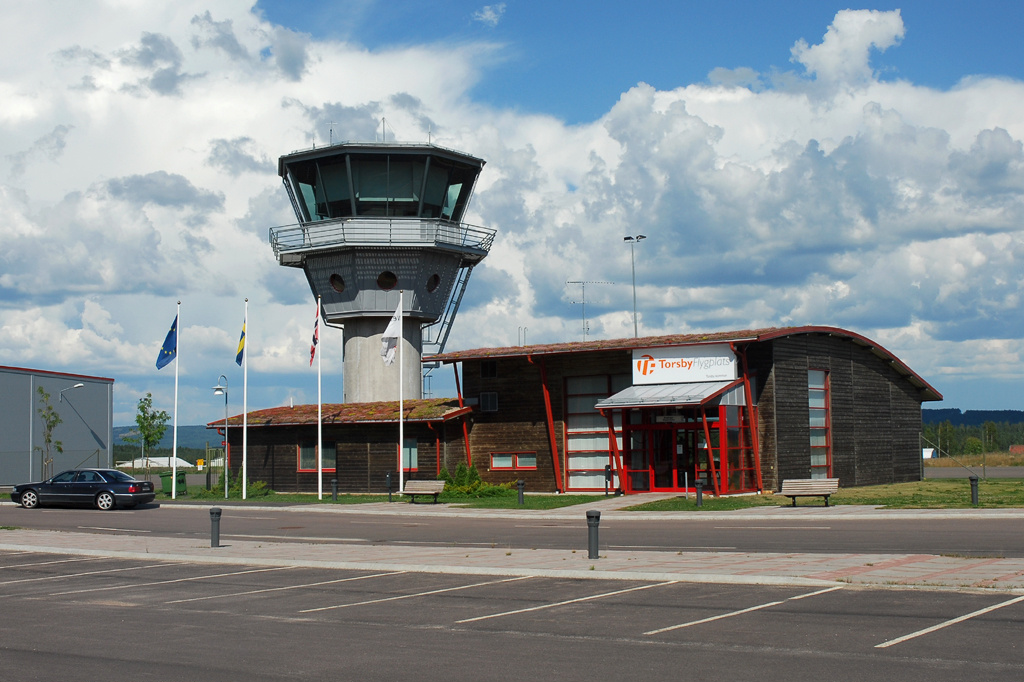
- IATA: TYF; ICAO: ESST

Summary
- Airport type: Public
- Operator: Municipality of Torsby
- Location: Torsby
- Elevation AMSL: 393 ft / 120 m
- Coordinates: 60°9′17″N 12°59′40″E
- Website: torsbyflygplats.se

Map

Runways
| Direction | Length | | Surface |
| Direction | ft | m | Surface |
|---|---|---|---|
| 16/34 | 5,216 | 1,590 | Asphalt |

Statistics (2019)
- Passengers total: 2,494
- Aircraft movements: 607

Torsby Airport is an airport in Torsby, Sweden (IATA: TYF, ICAO: ESST).

== Airlines and destinations ==
The following airlines operate regular scheduled and charter flights at Torsby Airport:

| Airlines | Destinations |
|---|---|
| Jonair | Hagfors, Stockholm–Arlanda |

== See also ==
- List of the largest airports in the Nordic countries
