= Torsby =

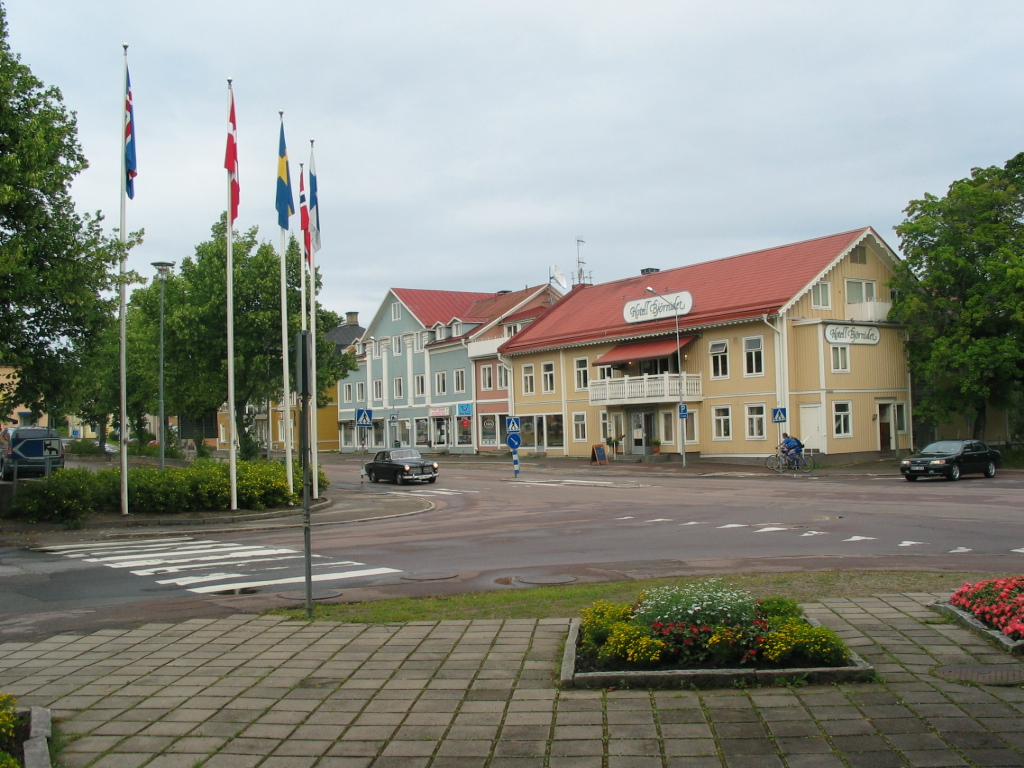
- Central Torsby

- Location within Sweden
- Coordinates: 60°08′N 13°00′E
- Country: Sweden
- Province: Värmland
- County: Värmland County
- Municipality: Torsby Municipality

Area
  - Total: 5.49 km^{2} (2.12 sq mi)

Population (31 December 2010)
  - Total: 4,049
  - Density: 738/km^{2} (1,910/sq mi)
- Time zone: UTC+1 (CET)
  - Summer (DST): UTC+2 (CEST)
- Climate: Dfb

Torsby (Swedish pronunciation: [ˈtǔːʂbʏ]) is a locality and the seat of Torsby Municipality in Värmland County, Sweden with 4,049 inhabitants in 2010.

Fortum Ski Tunnel Torsby, the world's longest ski tunnel, is located in Torsby.

There is an airport located near the locality with flights to Stockholm Arlanda Airport

== People ==
- Football manager Sven-Göran Eriksson and footballer Marcus Berg are both from Torsby.
- Monica Kristensen Solås, a glaciologist, meteorologist, polar explorer and crime novelist, was born in Torsby in 1950.
