= Torsby Ski Tunnel =

Skiing venue in Torsby, Sweden

Coordinates: 60°08′52″N 12°59′36″E

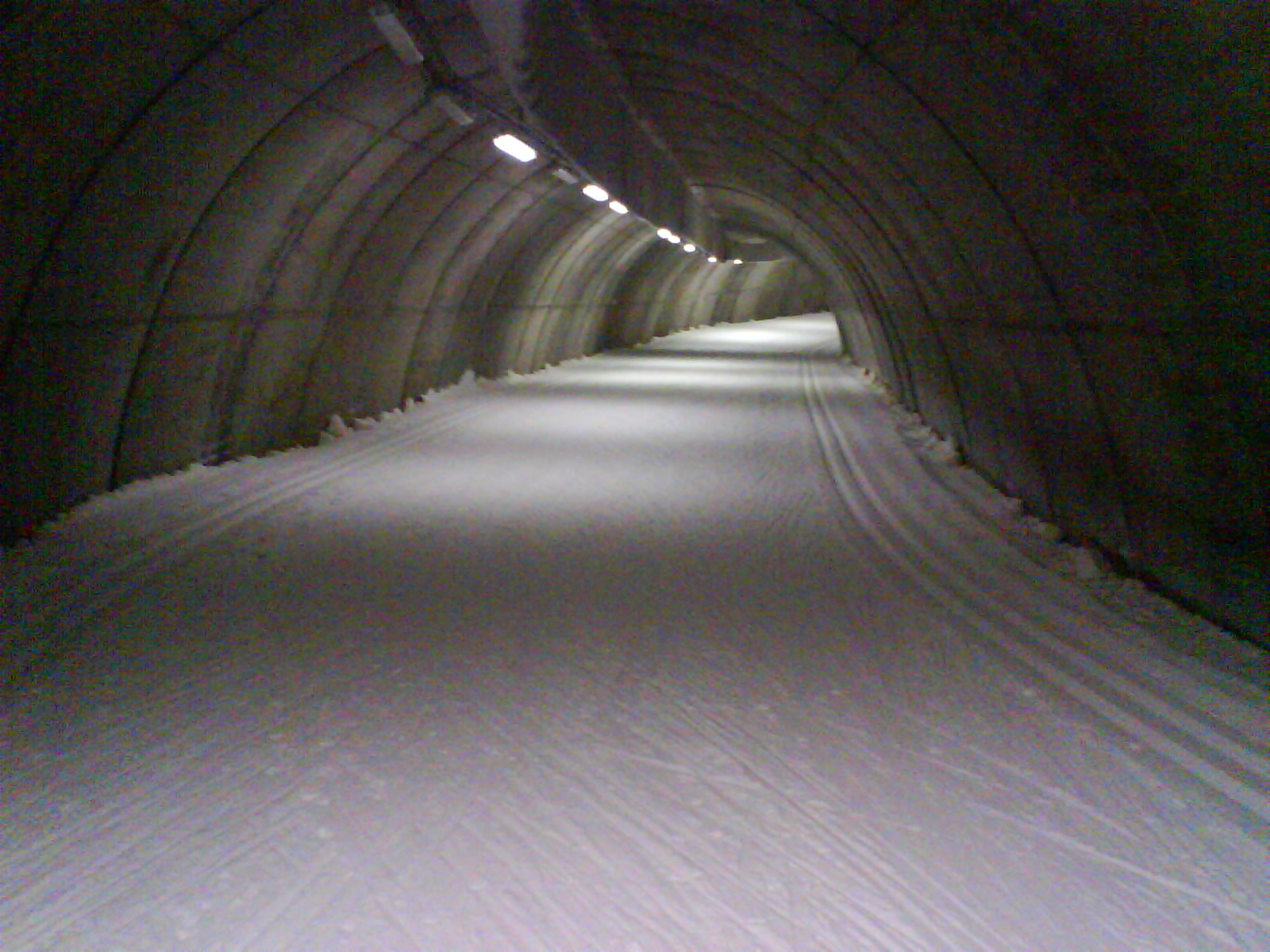
Interior from Torsby Ski Tunnel in Torsby, Sweden. Picture taken in the beginning of July 2009

Torsby Ski Tunnel is Sweden's first ski tunnel, located in Torsby, Sweden and was at the time of construction the world's longest ski tunnel. The tunnel was inaugurated on 16 June 2006 and is 1.3 km long, 8 m wide and 4 m high. Construction began in April 2005 and the total cost was just over 61 million SEK.
