= City Centre Deira =

- سيتي سنتر ديرة

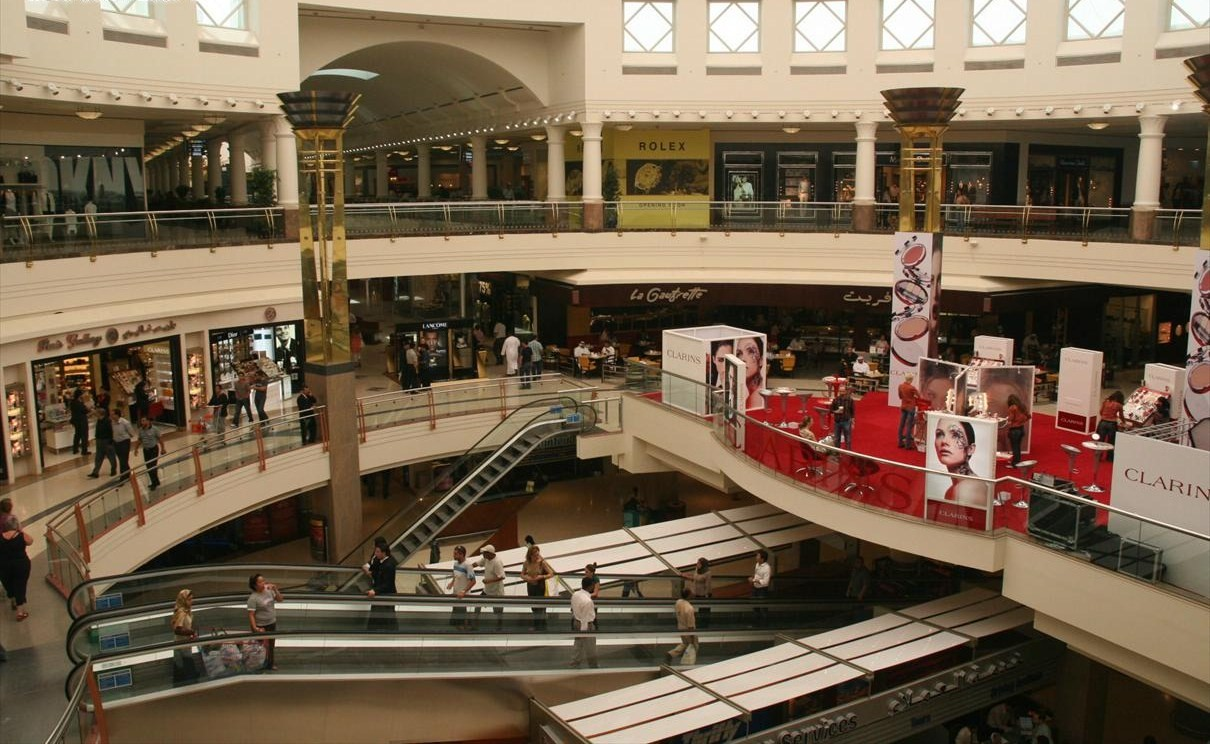
- City Centre Deira in 2007
- Location: Dubai, United Arab Emirates
- Coordinates: 25°15′5″N 55°19′56″E
- Opened: 28 November 1995; 30 years ago
- Manager: Majid Al Futtaim Group
- Owner: Majid Al Futtaim Group
- Num. of stores: 370
- Floor area: 1,300,000 sq ft (120,000 m^{2})
- Floors: 3
- Parking: 15000
- Website: citycentredeira.com

City Centre Deira (Arabic: سيتي سنتر ديرة) is a mall located in Port Saeed, Dubai, United Arab Emirates, and is the original flagship mall in the Majid Al Futtaim Properties portfolio.

City Centre Deira opened on 28 November 1995. It is located in the older part of the city on the crossroad between Sharjah, Bur Dubai and the Airport. It is a known shopping, entertainment and leisure complex with 3 levels. It has over 1.2 million sq. ft. of retail selling space, with 370 shops and 3,600 car-parking spaces. It's a land mark project, which was newly formed as Majid Al Futtaim Group and was the largest mall at the time .It was made at an initial cost of Dh300 million.

City Centre Deira is owned by the Majid Al Futtaim group, and is one of fourteen City Centre malls — the others are located in Mirdif, Me'aisem and Al Shindagha (Dubai); Sharjah, Ajman and Fujairah (UAE); Alexandria and Cairo (Egypt); Muscat, Qurum and Sohar (Oman); Manama (Bahrain); and Beirut (Lebanon).

In 2014, City Centre Deira changed its logo.

== Redevelopments ==
In 2008, the food court was renovated.

In 2011, City Centre Deira underwent redevelopment to open 55 new retail stores.

In March 2013, City Centre Deira announced a US$5.9m redevelopment project. The redevelopment upgraded the mall's centre court and created easier metro access and an enhanced food court.

== Shopping ==
City Centre Deira has 370 stores. The mall's anchor stores include Carrefour and Sharaf DG. The mall has a variety of electronics stores, cosmetic stores, toy stores, jewellery stores and textile stores. Retail outlets include Zara, Massimo Dutti and Hollister.

== Dining ==
City Centre Deira houses over 58 restaurants, cafés and food outlets including Chili's, Hatam and Gazebo; and two international food courts with 21 outlets such as KFC, New York Fries, McDonald's, Mrs Vanelli's, Charley's Grilled Subs and Chowking.

== Entertainment ==
=== Magic Planet ===
Magic Planet is a family entertainment centre in the Middle East. It features simulators, video games and theme rides for children.

=== The Wellness Centre ===
The Wellness Centre is a complimentary yoga class that usually happens every Saturday & Sunday.

=== VOX Cinemas ===
VOX Cinemas City Centre Deira is an 11-screen cinema multiplex with two 3D Digital RealD screens including Extreme Screen Digital screen cinema. VOX Cinemas is spread over 5,661 square meters with 2,795 seats and also features VOX Café.

== Hotels ==
City Centre Deira is connected to multiple hotels including City Centre Hotel and Residence, (managed by Accor Hotels), Novotel City Centre Deira, Ibis City Centre Deira, Pullman City Centre Deira and Aloft City Centre Deira.

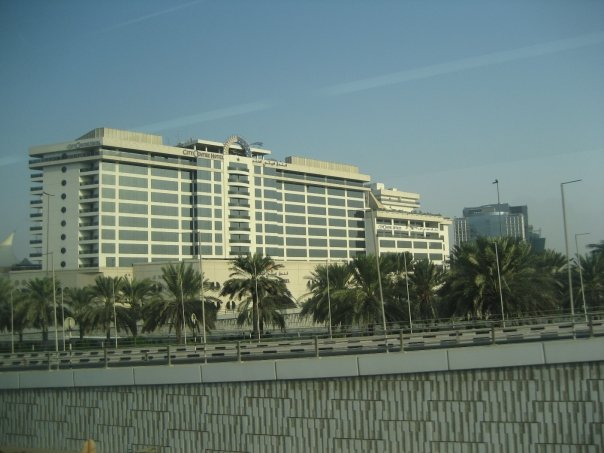
City Centre Hotel

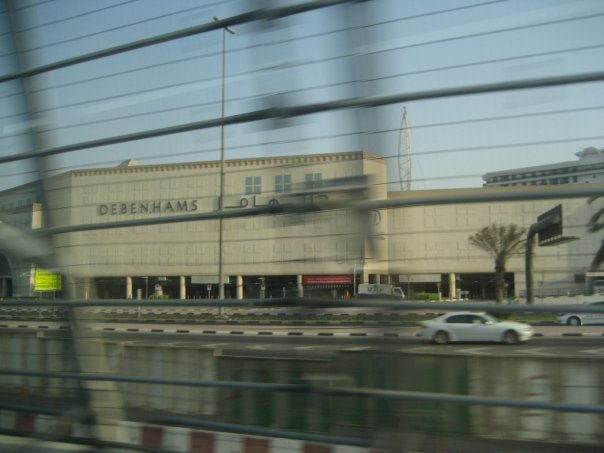
Debenhams Showroom at Deira City Centre
