= List of shopping malls in Egypt =

This is a list of shopping malls in Egypt.

== Alexandria ==
- City Centre Alexandria
- San Stefano Grand Plaza

== Cairo metropolitan area ==
- Cairo Festival City Mall
- City Centre Maadi
- Mall of Arabia (Cairo)
- Mall of Egypt
- Tiba Outlet Mall
- City Centre Almaza
