= City Centre Me'aisem =

City Center Me'aisem
- سیتي سنتر معیصم
- Location: Dubai, United Arab Emirates
- Coordinates: 25.04034°N 55.19681°E
- Address: Sheikh Mohammed Bin Zayed Road, IMPZ, Dubai Production City - Me'aisem 1 - Dubai - United Arab Emirates
- Opened: 1 September 2015; 11 years ago
- Manager: Majid Al Futtaim Group
- Owner: Majid Al Futtaim Group
- Num. of stores: 53+
- Floor area: 325,000 sq ft (30,200 m^{2})
- Floors: 1
- Parking: 750 cars
- Website: City Centre Me'aisem Website

City Centre Me'aisem (Arabic: سیتي سنتر معیصم) is a shopping mall located in Dubai, United Arab Emirates, and it is the fourth mall owned by Majid Al Futtaim Properties operating in Dubai and the sixth mall operating in the United Arab Emirates.

The mall opened on 1 September 2015 and it serves as community mall located in International Media Production Zone, near the intersection of Al Khail Road and Shaikh Mohammand Bin Zayed Road.

Named for its location in the Me’aisem area of Dubai Production City (IMPZ).

== Construction ==
The mall was built with an investment of AED 275 million by Majid Al Futtaim Group. The phase one of the mall covers the area of 325,000 sq ft (30,200 m^{2}) with the gross leasable area of 23,850 sq ft (2,216 m^{2}). Phase 2, where the expansion of the mall may be completed by 2020.ٍ

== Available Services ==
- ATMs
- Bookstores, toys and gifts
- Home Supplies & Electronics
- Fashion
- Health, Beauty, Fitness and Perfumes

City Centre Me'aisem also has a number of cafes, restaurants, sweets and nuts shops, all of which are international brands. There is also a section for family and children’s entertainment.

== See also ==
- Mall of the Emirates
- Deira City Centre
- Mirdiff City Centre
