= Wim Hoste =

Belgian singer

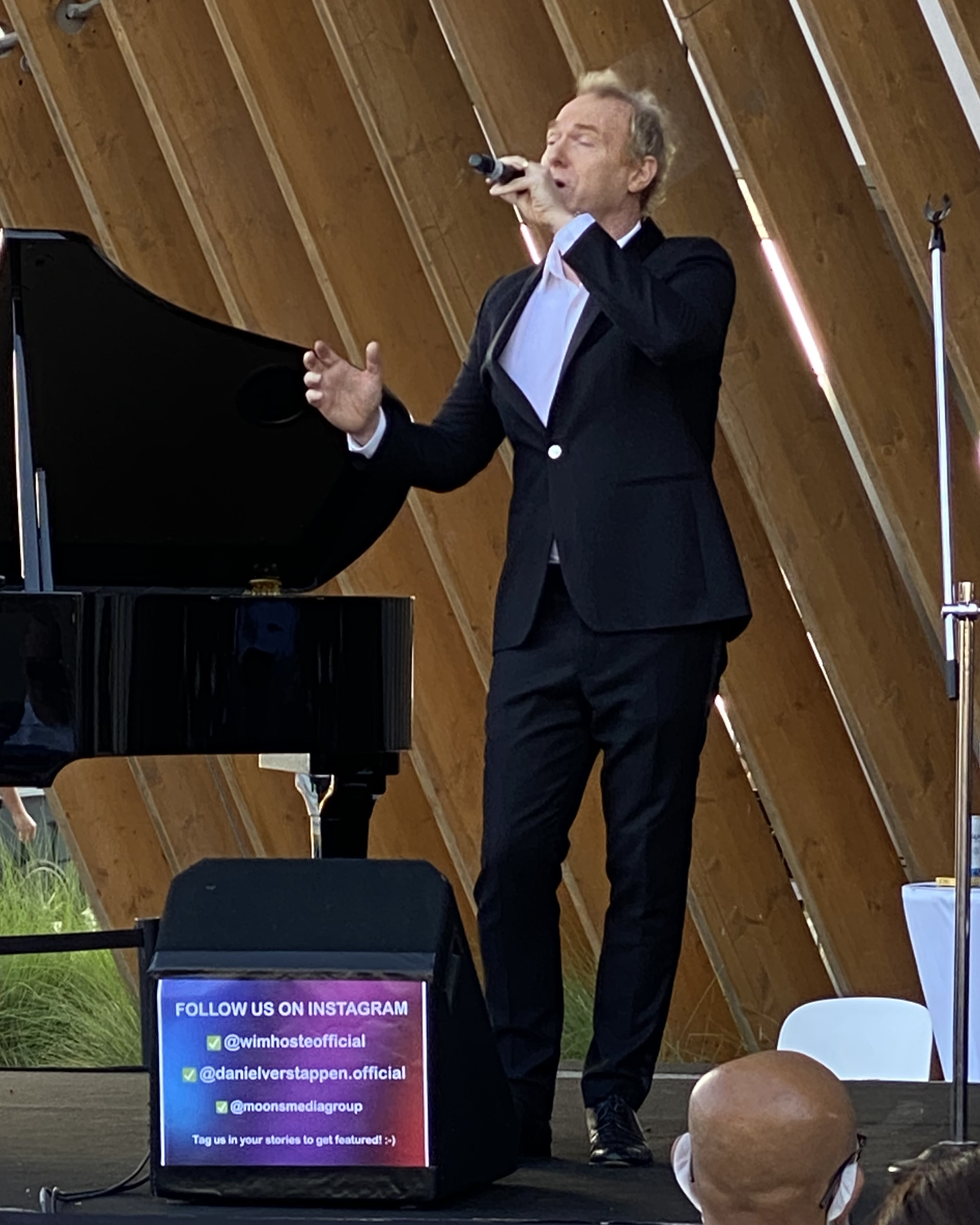
- Wim Hoste performing at Expo 2022 in Dubai on 19 March 2022
- Born: Wim Jozef Madeleine Hoste; 15 October 1963 (age 62); Ghent, Belgium
- Occupation: Singer
- Years active: 2012–present
- Spouse: Jin Soo Young
- Parents: Walter Hoste (father); Liliane Vervust (mother)
- Musical career
- Genres: Crooner
- Website: wimhoste.com

Wim Jozef Madeleine Hoste (born 15 October 1963) is a Belgian singer.

== Early life ==
Hoste was born in Ghent, Belgium. Being the youngest from a family with 4 siblings, he grew up in an environment of entrepreneurs. His father worked in the distillery business while his mother worked as a personal assistant for a German company.

Already from a young age, Hoste created a passion for singing. However, at the age of 11, his doctor told him that he would lose his voice by the age of 30 if he would continue, which made him give up singing.

At the age of 26, Hoste left Belgium to start a career in the aviation. After taking up roles with Thai Airways International, former Belgian national airline Sabena and Virgin Atlantic, he eventually moved into logistics, trading and consultancy shifting between Europe and Angola.

== Relocation to Dubai ==
In 2006, Hoste relocated to Dubai and has since resided in Palm Jumeirah with his wife, Korean mezzo soprano Jin Soo Young.

Alongside his job as a consultant, Hoste performed occasionally as a singer in Dubai since 2012.

In 2022, he decided to pursue his dream and shifted to a full time professional career as entertainer.

== Live show collaborations ==
=== Love Beyond The Sea with Alex Broun ===
In 2018, Hoste met Australian playwright and former Neighbours actor Alex Broun. With the help of Broun, he created the Best of Broadway show, which he performed in the Madinat Theatre in Dubai.

In 2020, Hoste and Broun worked together on Don't You Forget About Me, a cinema-meets-concert production which the two described in The National as "an interactive live cinema experience”. In the show, cruise ship-singer Oliver (Hoste) falls in love with cover girl Chloe (played on screen by actress Suzie Demetri Robertson). Hoste performed this show in several theaters in Dubai including VOX Cinemas.

In 2021, the show was renamed to Love Beyond The Sea and was performed by Hoste on Queen Elizabeth 2.

=== A Night of Classical and Acoustic Rock with Nikhil Uzgare ===
In November 2020, Hoste collaborated with Indian musician Nikhil Uzgare, the first independent artist to be signed on to Universal Music MENA, on A Night of Classical and Acoustic Rock, which they performed in Dubai Community Theatre and Arts Centre in Mall of the Emirates.

The show, including songs from bands such as A-ha, Simple Minds, The Police and singers such as Frank Sinatra, Louis Armstrong and Andrea Bocelli, also featured Belgian pianist Clarissa Zaruk, Belgian vocalist Annekatrien Van Wassenhove and Russian musician Ivan Kovalenko.

=== The Movies Night Live with Isabel Cañada Luna ===
In May 2021, Hoste, Spanish soprano Isabel Cañada Luna and Kovalenko joined forces for Immortal Songs - Best of Crooners, Musical and Opera.

In August 2021, the show was renamed to The Movies Night Live and the musical partners focused on interpreting soundtracks from blockbusters such as Moulin Rouge!, Ghost: The Musical and The Godfather.

== COVID-19 live concerts ==
During the COVID-19 pandemic, Hoste livestreamed several concerts from his own house between April and December 2020.

Inspired by the pandemic, he wrote his first own song called Life is Beautiful, which he recorded in collaboration with local artists and a choir consisting of children from the Dubai Bilingual French International School.

== Expo 2020 ==
On 5 February 2022, Hoste performed alongside Belgian pianist Daniel Verstappen at the Belgium Pavilion at Expo 2020 during the visit of King Philippe and Queen Mathilde of Belgium.

In March 2022, Hoste performed 3 more times at Expo. Next to one solo performance, he also shared the stage with Cañada Luna and again Verstappen.

== Present ==
In May 2022, Hoste released the first 2 episodes of Gems of Arabia by Wim Hoste, a talk show in which he invites and interviews UAE-based and international guests from the performing arts industry.

Hoste worked on the series together with Belgian journalist and entrepreneur Christophe Moons. The first 2 episodes were recorded in HOUSE OF PIANOS in Dubai.

In June 2022, Hoste, who stated that he always has been a fan of the James Bond music, released 4 new songs inspired by the 007 franchise. “I wrote the lyrics and I started to make songs around it. It was not possible to do everything in 1 song, so I created 4 songs. It's a story about James Bond and love. I wanted to show the human side of James Bond", Hoste told in an interview with Dubai Eye 103.8.

On 6 June 2022, Hoste revealed his plans to release an album and create a new concert tour.

In August and September 2022, Hoste visited South Korea for a promotional tour.

From April 2023 to May 2024, Wim Hoste performed weekly in Dubai in the show Saturday Night Cabaret Show, held at 53 Dubai, which claimed to be the highest dinner show venue in the Gulf.

In 2025, Wim became the resident singer at the Palazzo Versace Dubai.

In April 2026, Hoste was scheduled to perform four performances of Wim Hoste: Jazz and Beyond at Jazz Club Groove in Seocho-gu, Seoul.

== Discography ==
=== Singles ===
- Life is Beautiful (2021)
- Life is Beautiful (Charlie Deep Remix) (2021)
- Through The Darkness (2022)
- Impossible Love (2022)
- Mission of Love (2022)
- Inside Me (2022)
- Sandy Sunny Christmas (2025)
