= Orbi Dubai =

Closed tourist attraction in Dubai

- Interactive map of Orbi Dubai
- Location: Dubai, United Arab Emirates
- Coordinates: 25°12′56″N 55°24′29″E
- Opened: May 7, 2017
- Closed: April 30, 2019
- Owner: Majid Al Futtaim Group, Sega, BBC Earth

Attractions
- Total: 13
- Website: www.orbidubai.com

Orbi Dubai was an interactive visitor attraction in Mirdif City Centre in Dubai, United Arab Emirates. It was the third Orbi attraction in the world and the first to open outside of Japan.

== History ==
Orbi Dubai officially opened on 7 May 2017 and was attended by representatives from SEGA, the BBC and Majid Al Futtaim Leisure and Entertainment, as well as Orbi’s Nature Ambassador, the explorer Nabil Al Busaidi. Orbi Dubai was created by Japanese technology firm SEGA in collaboration with BBC Worldwide and Dubai shopping mall operator Majid Al Futtaim. Orbi Dubai closed on 30 April 2019.
