= Majid Al Futtaim Group =

Emirati holding company

Majid Al Futtaim Holding LLC
- Native name: شركة ماجد الفطيم القابضة ذ.م.م
- Type: Private
- Industry: Property development; Retail; Hospitality; Leisure and entertainment
- Founded: May 11, 1992; 34 years ago
- Founder: Majid Al Futtaim
- Headquarters: Dubai, United Arab Emirates
- Area served: Middle East, Africa and Central Asia: Armenia; Bahrain; Egypt; Georgia; Iran; Iraq; Jordan; Kuwait; Lebanon; Oman; Pakistan; Qatar; Saudi Arabia; United Arab Emirates
- Key people: Fadel Abdulbaqi Al Ali (chairman); Ahmed Galal Ismail (CEO, Holding); Dr. Günther Helm (CEO, Retail); Ahmed El Shamy (CEO, Properties); Ignace Lahoud (CEO, Entertainment); Fahed Ghanim (CEO, Lifestyle)
- Brands: A&F; Carrefour; Crate & Barrel; Dalloyau; Dreamscape lululemon
- Revenue: ▲AED 34.5 billion (2023)
- Operating income: ▲AED 4.6 billion (2023)
- Total assets: ▲AED 69.7 billion (2023)
- Number of employees: 43,000 (2023)
- Subsidiaries: Majid Al Futtaim Properties Majid Al Futtaim Retail Majid Al Futtaim Ventures
- Website: www.majidalfuttaim.com

Majid Al Futtaim Holding (Arabic: شركة ماجد الفطيم القابضة) is an Emirati holding company based in Dubai. The family-owned conglomerate owns and operates shopping malls, retail, and hotel establishments in the Middle East and North Africa.

The firm was established by Majid Al Futtaim in 1992 and is best known as the owner of the Mall of the Emirates in Dubai and being the franchisee of French hypermarket chain Carrefour in the Middle East, North Africa and Central Asia.

In 2023, MAF had AED 34.5 billion in revenues and AED 2.7 billion in net profit.

== History ==
MAF Holding was founded in 1992 when Majid Al Futtaim left the retail-oriented family business, led by his cousin, Abdullah, and created a new firm to run his real estate and property management concerns. The break-up of the two firms was finalized in 2000 when the head of Dubai Sheikh Mohammed bin Rashid Al Maktoum arbitrated an agreement between the two siblings that divided their assets, liabilities and business divisions. Majid Al Futtaim died in 2021.

In September 2022, the company was listed by Forbes in the Middle East's Top 100 Arab Family Businesses, ranking sixth.

== Majid Al Futtaim Properties ==
Majid Al Futtaim Properties develops, owns and manages shopping malls and hotels in the MENA region. The hotels business unit focuses on the development and asset management of hotels connected to or close to the company's shopping malls and within its master-planned communities. It owned and operated 12 hotels as of 2015. In 2017, Majid Al Futtaim Properties reported a profit of 2.19 billion dirhams ($596.25 million), down 7% on 2016.

=== Shopping malls ===
- Mall of the Emirates: located in Al Barsha on Sheikh Zayed Road in Dubai. Since its opening in 2005, the mall has become a main attraction in Dubai, welcome more than 42 million visitors annually. Mall includes more than 630 international stores.
- Mall of Egypt: Opened in March 2017 with location in Sixth of October.
- Mall of Oman: Located in Bousher on Muscat Expressway in Muscat
- Mall of Saudi: in Riyadh, set to be completed by 2025–2026.
- City Centre malls:
  - City Centre Ajman: Opened in 1998 in Ajman, UAE
  - City Centre Bahrain: Opened in 2008 in Manama (Bahrain)
  - City Centre Deira: Opened in 1995 in Dubai, UAE
  - City Centre Fujairah: Opened in 2012 in Fujairah, UAE
  - Mirdif City Centre: Opened in 2010, in Dubai
  - City Centre Muscat: Opened in 2001 in Muscat (Oman) Located on Sultan Qaboos Road (3 km from Muscat International Airport), Seeb, Muscat Governorate, Sultanate of Oman. City Centre Muscat underwent an expansion in 2007 that doubled the size of the mall adding more than 60 new stores and increasing its retail space to 60,484 square meters. In June 2013, the mall announced a second redevelopment to add 48,500 square feet of retail space dedicated to entertainment and leisure.
  - City Centre Suhar (Sohar): Opened in 2019 in Muscat (Oman) on Al Batinah main road
  - City Centre Maadi
  - City Centre Almaza
  - City Centre Alexandria
  - City Centre Al Zahia: located in Sharjah, UAE

=== Communities ===
MAF aims to create communities with integrated MAF residential, commercial, retail, leisure and entertainment facilities.

- Al Mouj Muscat: residential properties with green spaces, pedestrian walkways and inland waterways, retail and dining facilities, a 400-berth marina, and a golf course.
- Al Zahia: Mall scheduled for completion in 2020, final completion scheduled in 2023.
- Waterfront City Business Park in Beirut, Lebanon. Scheduled for final completion in 2027.
- Tilal Al Ghaf: Scheduled for completion in 2027.

== Majid Al Futtaim Retail ==
The retail division owns and operates hypermarkets and supermarkets, as well as fashion and specialty retail stores.

=== Hypermarkets and supermarkets ===
In 1995 MAF Retail entered in a joint venture with French retailer Carrefour and became franchisee and operator of its chain of supermarkets and hypermarkets in the MENA region. The joint venture, known as Majid Al Futtaim Hypermarkets, became fully owned by MAF Retail in May 2013 subsequent to Carrefour's divestment of its 25 percent share, valued at €530 million ($683 million). In June 2017, MAF announced it bought 26 Géant hypermarkets in the UAE, Bahrain and Kuwait from BMA International. All locations were rebranded under the Carrefour banner. In February 2018, Egyptians Ministry of Investment and International Cooperation and the National Service Project of the Armed Forces signed a cooperation protocol with Majid Al-Futtaim in the aim to establish 100 Carrefour retail stores in different governorates of Egypt. In December 2018, Majid Al Futtaim announced their plans to rebrand of Hyperstar to Carrefour across Pakistan. A new Carrefour is expected to open in the Mall of Defence in Lahore in early 2019.

The company introduced the world's first sail-through supermarket "Bites and More by the Shore", in December 2018. The supermarket operates off the coast of Dubai in order to cater to customers on yachts, boats and jet skis. In January 2019, Majid Al Futtaim Retail signs a contract with Nshama, a UAE-based developer of master-planned communities, to open a new 8,000 sq ft Carrefour Hypermarket in Town Square Dubai.

In January 2019, speaking at the annual World Economic Forum in Davos, Alain Bejjani (CEO) announced the group's intention to introduce a Saudi-only workforce in the Carrefour supermarkets across the country. The same year, MAF launched its Retail Business School, which focuses on programmes for employees running its Carrefour operations. Majid al Futtaim currently operates 90 hypermarkets and 120 supermarkets in 15 countries.

In the first half of 2018, Majid Al Futtaim Retail launched its largest regional distribution center in Dubai's National Industries Park.

The company has invested heavily in data analysis and digital capabilities as well as relevant companies and start-ups that serve multiples channels. In December 2017, it launched a School of Analytics and Technology, along with A², its Advanced Analytics Centre of Excellence. The same year, its company signed a Memorandum of Understanding (MoU) with Smart Dubai to help improve the emirate's data analytics capabilities.

In 2025, it rebranded from Carrefour to HyperMax in all its Middle East branches.

=== Fashion ===
MAF Fashion was created in 2005 to handle the newly acquired fashion brand Mexx franchise. In 2006, Liz Claiborne Inc., Mexx's parent company agreed to extend the franchise to include Lucky Brand Jeans, Liz Claiborne and Monet & Co. In February 2013 MAF Fashion signed a franchise agreement with Halston Heritage. Also in 2013, MAF Fashion created a joint venture with Abercrombie & Fitch that brought Hollister stores to the region. Abercrombie & Fitch's eponymous brand followed in December 2014, opening its first Middle East stores in Kuwait, the region's flagship store opened in Dubai in December 2015 in the MAF-owned Mall of the Emirates. In February 2015 MAF Fashion signed a deal with Lululemon Athletica for a franchise in five countries, the first store opened in 2015.

In April 2017, Majid Al Futtaim Fashion moved into the home furnishing market with a five-year franchise deal with Crate & Barrel, the first store opened in Qatar and expansion into other GCC countries followed, while the first CB2 concept store opened in 2022. A deal with homeware brand Maisons du Monde was signed in June 2017.

=== Partnerships ===
- With I.am+: In 2019, MAF became the first retail conglomerate announced as a member of the A.R.C (a coalition of retailers, brands and service providers) to provide physical and virtual experiences for multi-channel offerings.

=== Online shopping ===
- Kenya: In 2018 the group signed a partnership with online retailer Jumia.
- In 2018, the group invested in Wadi, an online grocery delivery portal, as part of a $30 million funding round to help set up the delivery structure for Carrefour stores in Saudi Arabia.

== Majid Al Futtaim Ventures ==
Majid Al Futtaim Ventures is a group of companies that offer amenities such as cinemas, leisure and entertainment, financial services, fashion and healthcare and JVs in facility management and food and beverages. Majid Al Futtaim Ventures is a unit of Majid Al Futtaim (MAF) Group.

=== Leisure and entertainment ===
Majid Al Futtaim Leisure and Entertainment operates Ski Dubai, an indoor ski resort with 22,500 square meters of indoor ski area at the Mall of the Emirates, as well as 18 Magic Planet family entertainment centres. In addition, Magic Planet operates a facility within City Centre Mirdif, a temperature controlled indoor and outdoor water park, and the first Lego store in the Middle East in Abu Dhabi.

- Aquaplay
- Ski Dubai: A mountain-themed snow setting at Mall of the Emirates in Dubai.
- Ski Egypt: Introduced in March 2017, it is Africa's first indoor ski slope, situated at Mall of Egypt, in Cairo.
- Orbi Dubai: Initially introduced in Yokohama, Japan in 2013 as an experimental visitor attraction, Orbi is an indoor nature experience, fusing BBC Earth’s nature content with Sega’s technology. The first Middle East installation is planned for City Centre Mirdif in the UAE.
- Wahoo! Waterpark: Located at City Centre Bahrain with an area of 15,000 square meters, it is the Middle East's first indoor-outdoor waterpark, including Flowrider, the world's first full size surfing machine at an indoor park.
- iFly Dubai: Indoor skydiving in Dubai. Located at City Centre Mirdif, it allows guests to enjoy the experience of human body flight.
- Little Explorers: Located at City Centre Mirdif, provides education and entertainment for children aged two to seven.
- Magic Planet: provides a range of simulations, online and arcade games and rides. First opened at City Centre Deira in 1995, Magic Planet has since grown to 32 locations in the Middle East and Africa.

=== Family and retail entertainment ===
- Lego stores: In 2015, the group opened the first LEGO-certified store in the MENA region in Yas Mall, Abu Dhabi. In 2016, a LEGO store opened at Mall 360 and The Avenues Mall in Kuwait, the second in the country.
- American Girl: In 2017, the group signed an agreement with American Girl, a division of Mattel, and a premium brand for dolls, giving the group exclusive distribution rights in the UAE, Saudi Arabia, Kuwait, Qatar, Bahrain and Oman. The first American Girl store in the UAE opened in November 2017 at City Centre Mirdif. In 2020, these stores were closed.

=== Cinemas ===
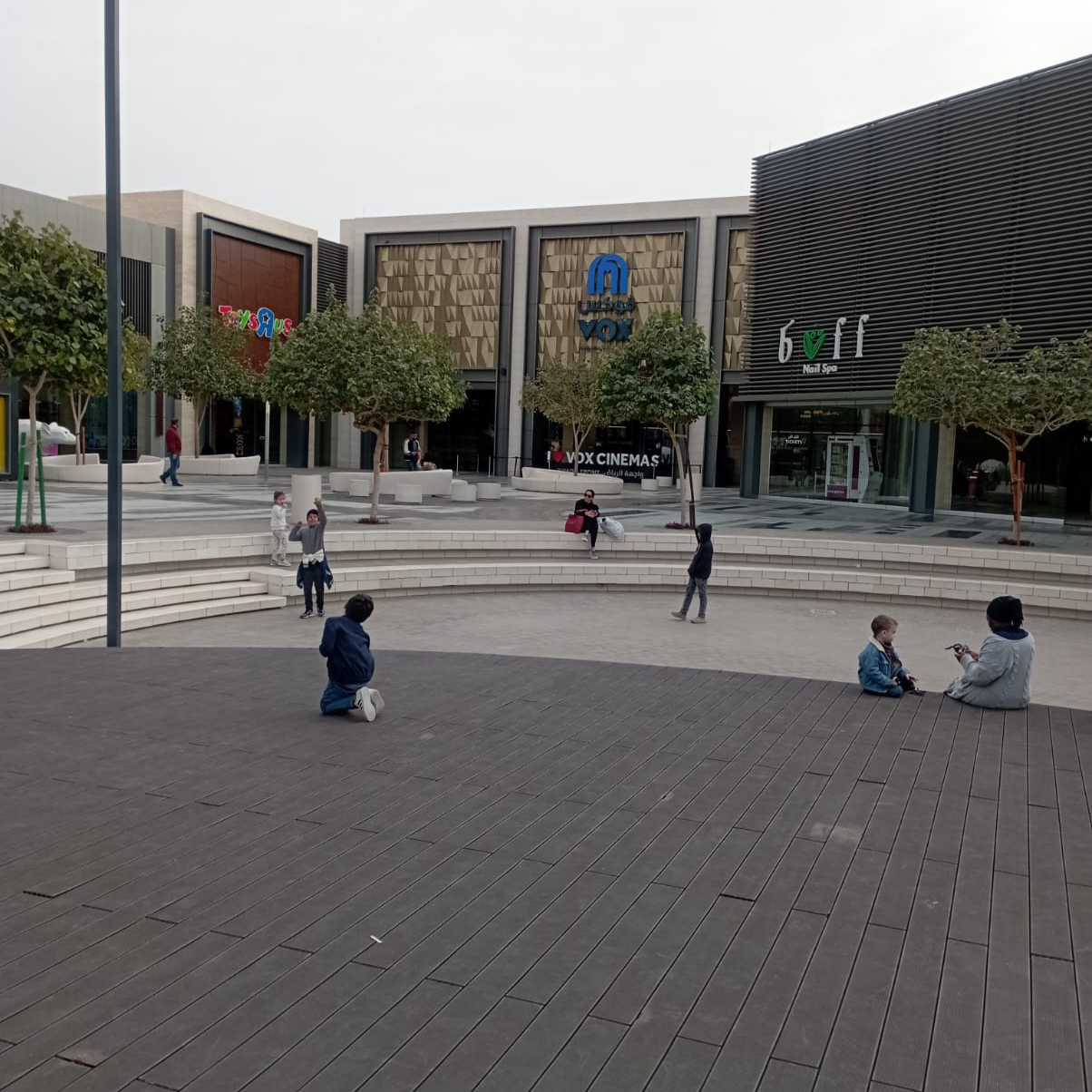
VOX Cinemas (center) at Riyadh Front in Riyadh, Saudi Arabia

Vox Cinemas operates 573 screens in the Middle East, including a flagship 24-screen complex at the Mall of the Emirates in Dubai, which relaunched in 2015. Expanding into Saudi Arabia after a cinema ban was lifted, the company opened its first multiplex in Riyadh in 2018 and plans to add 300 new screens as part of a $4 billion investment.

=== Restaurants and cafés ===
In 2013, the group established a joint venture agreement with Gourmet Gulf, a food and beverage retail company. Majid Al Futtaim now co-owns the development and franchise rights to food brands such as Dalloyau, California Pizza Kitchen, YO! Sushi, Texas de Brazil, in more than 20 food and beverage outlets in the region.

=== Financial services ===
In 2018, the group acquired Beam Portal, a Dubai-based mobile payments provider.

=== Energy ===
Previously "MAF Dalkia" (a partnership between Majid Al Futtaim Ventures and Dalkia). In 2015, MAF Dalkia Middle East rebranded to ‘Enova’, a joint venture company between Majid Al Futtaim and Veolia.
