= E-Junior =

United Arab Emirates children's television channel

e-junior HD
- Country: United Arab Emirates
- Broadcast area: Arab world
- Headquarters: Dubai, UAE

Programming
- Languages: Arabic; English; French
- Picture format: 576i (4:3 SDTV); 1080i (16:9 HDTV)

History
- Launched: 15 January 2001; 25 years ago

Links
- Website: www.ejunior.ae

e-junior is the first UAE children television channel created by e-Vision which is part of Etisalat, the largest telecom operator in the Middle East. "e-junior" was launched in the year 2001, it targets kids up to 14 years old. the channel content is a mix of educational, fun, adventurous and fantasy programmes.

"e-junior" is available on eLifeTV the IPTV service from Etisalat in the UAE, and eLife channel number 333.

== History ==
e-junior was launched on 15 January 2001 at 12:00 pm. The channel's launch celebrated with Etisalat executive Humaid Rashid Sahoo cutting a cake during a children's carnival at the Magic Planet Golf Course at Deira City Centre.

=== New look ===
On 15 January 2009, e-junior got a new logo and branding to coincide with its 8th anniversary. It now has four mascots: Red, Blue, Orange, and Green each representing programming content type throughout the day; Red is for movies, Blue is for preschool shows, Orange is for live-action shows, and Green is for animation shows.

== See also ==
- Etisalat
