= City Centre Muscat =

- Location: Seeb, Muscat Governorate, Oman
- Coordinates: 23.5994°N 58.2478°E
- Opened: 2001
- Owner: Majid Al Futtaim Group
- Num. of stores: 142
- Num. of anchor tenants: 13
- Floors: 2
- Website: muscatcitycentre.com

City Centre Muscat is a shopping mall located on Sultan Qaboos Road 3 km (1.9 mi) from Muscat International Airport), Seeb, Muscat Governorate, Sultanate of Oman. The mall opened in October 2001. It was developed and is managed by Majid Al Futtaim Properties.

City Centre Muscat underwent an expansion in 2007 that doubled the size of the mall introducing more than 60 new stores and increasing its retail space to 60,484 m^{2} (651,040 sq ft). In June 2013, the mall announced a second redevelopment to add 4,510 m^{2} (48,500 sq ft) of retail space dedicated to entertainment and leisure.

== History ==
City Centre Muscat was the first business that Majid Al Futtaim established in Oman. In 2014, the mall added a ten-screen VOX Cinemas complex, which the company describes as the first in the country, together with 700 parking spaces. A redevelopment completed in 2015 at a cost of ر.ع. 35 million added 10,000 square metres of space and 60 stores, and was reported to have created 1,350 jobs.

According to the company, the mall has also been the market entry point for a number of international brands that arrived in Oman for the first time. In October 2026, Majid Al Futtaim marked the mall's 25th anniversary, together with the fifth anniversary of its Mall of Oman, which opened in September 2021, and stated that City Centre Muscat had received more than 180 million visitors since opening.

== Shops / food and beverage ==
City Centre Muscat houses 142 international and local brands including the following anchor stores:

- Applebee's American Restaurant
- HyperMax Hypermarket – 13,909 m^{2} (149,720 sq ft)
- Home Centre – 5,515 m^{2} (59,360 sq ft)
- Centrepoint – 4,492 m^{2} (48,350 sq ft)
- Max Fashion – 2,772 m^{2} (29,840 sq ft)
- Emax – 2,619 m^{2} (28,190 sq ft)
- Zara and Zara Home – 2,057 m^{2} (22,140 sq ft)
- Marks & Spencer – 1,904 m^{2} (20,490 sq ft)
- Toys R Us – 1,368 m^{2} (14,730 sq ft)
- H&M – 1,276 m^{2} (13,730 sq ft)
- Sun & Sand Sports – 1,218 m^{2} (13,110 sq ft)
- Magic Planet
- Gap
- Bershka
- Virgin Megastore
- American Eagle Outfitters
- MANGO Fashion
- Starbucks
- Buffalo Wild Wings
- Forever 21
- PAUL

The mall also has 18 restaurants, cafés, and fast food outlets, with seating capacity for over a thousand people. It includes VOX Cinemas complex for film entertainment.
