= City Centre Ajman =

- سيتي سنتر عجمان
- Location: Ajman, United Arab Emirates
- Coordinates: 25°23′58″N 55°28′45″E
- Opened: 1 December 1998; 27 years ago
- Owner: Majid Al Futtaim Group
- Num. of stores: 79
- Floors: 2
- Parking: 2100
- Website: www.citycentreajman.com

City Centre Ajman (Arabic: سيتي سنتر عجمان) is a shopping mall in the emirate of Ajman, United Arab Emirates (UAE), which is owned and operated by Majid Al Futtaim. With 34,000 m^{2} (370,000 sq ft) of retail space and 10.5 million yearly visitors, it is the largest mall in the emirate. It is located on Al Ittihad Street (E11), in the district of Al Jurf, off Sheikh Khalifa Interchange and north of Sheikh Maktoum Bin Rashid Road. The mall has 79 international and local brands including Ajman's Carrefour hypermarket, VOX Cinemas, Magic Planet along with 18 dining outlets.

== Milestones ==
- December 1998 – City Centre Ajman Opens.
- July 2016 – Phase 1 Redevelopment commencement.
- December 2017 – Launch of New Wing with 39 new stores.
- 2019 – Completion of redevelopment and launch of all 79 stores

== History ==
City Centre Ajman Opening.

City Centre Ajman opened on 1 December 1998 and its launch was attended by His Highness Humaid bin Rashid Al Nuaimi, the ruler of Ajman and Majid Al Futtaim, the founder, owner and president of the Majid Al Futtaim Group. The mall is owned and operated by Majid Al Futtaim Properties, an Emirati real estate and property services company that is part of Majid Al Futtaim Group, and is one of 13 malls under the company's 'City Centre' brand. City Centre Ajman was the second Mall in Majid Al Futtaim Properties portfolio to be opened, following the launch of Deira City Centre (now renamed City Centre Deira) in Dubai three years previously. Initially named Ajman City Centre, its name was changed in 2014. The mall is designed by Dubai-based architects Holford Associates, while the master plan, and concept and schematic design were carried out by Bose architects.

== Location ==
It is located on Al Ittihad Street (E11), in the district of Al Jurf, off Sheikh Khalifa Interchange and north of Sheikh Maktoum Bin Rashid Road.

== Size ==
The mall has a Gross leasable area (GLA) of 34,000 square meters (sqm). With 2,100 parking spaces, the single-storey development has 79 stores and 18 dining venues with indoor and outdoor seating. It also has a multiplex cinema and Magic Planet, the family entertainment centre. Gross leasable area (GLA): 34,000 m^{2} (370,000 sq ft), to be expanded to 55,300 m^{2} (595,000 sq ft), Magic Planet: 1,466 m^{2} (15,780 sq ft), VOX Cinemas: 3,515 m^{2} (37,840 sq ft), Carrefour: 13,606 m^{2} (146,450 sq ft), H&M: 1,670 m^{2} (18,000 sq ft), Centrepoint: 4,102 m^{2} (44,150 sq ft), Sun & Sand Sports: 834 m^{2} (8,980 sq ft).

== Architecture ==
The mall, which has finished a renovation, follows a contemporary, intuitive design. A new wing has been constructed and opened in December 2017. It is bathed in natural light due to its skylight roof. The design of Ajman shopping mall is done by Eng Hamidullah Mohammady an Afghan Architcure.

== Visitors ==
City Centre Ajman records 10.5 million visitors annually, mostly from the Northern Emirates region (Ajman, Sharjah, Ras Al Khaimah and Umm Al Quwain). Its includes UAE nationals and residents from the Middle East, North Africa, and South & East Asia. The rest are tourists visiting the region.

== Redevelopment ==
In 2016, Majid Al Futtaim invested AED 643 million in a phased enhancement project at City Centre Ajman. The gross leasable area of the mall has been expanded from its initial size of 34,000 sqm to 55,300 sqm. The upgraded mall will be launched in 2019. New wing includes North American fashion label Garage, British brand Lush, sportswear store Sun & Sand Sports, and dining outlets like Panda Express and Al Baik. Construction is being carried out in line with green building practices and Majid Al Futtaim's sustainability strategies. Energy-efficient design and procedures, including installing LED lighting and water-saving measures like low-flow faucets and fixtures will reduce the mall's environmental impact, including its carbon footprint.

The redevelopment phase 1 is expected to completed with the addition of 30 more venues by April 2018. Stores added include an Indian cuisine Gazebo, kid's essential brand Mothercare, Carters, electronics store Jacky's, Pure Gold etc. When the new wing was opened in December 2017, 14 chain stores were added. Dining areas have been increased to include alfresco seating for some venues. Magic Planet, The children's amusement Centre, has been enlarged by 358 sqm and relocated to the new wing, while the number of screens at VOX Cinemas has been increased from six to nine. The mall's car park was expanded by 200 bays, taking the number of parking spaces from 1,600 to 1,800 and added the shaded car park. Other new facilities include prayer rooms and additional restrooms incorporating baby changing rooms.

== Phase Two ==
Phase two of the redevelopment will commence in April 2018 and is scheduled for completion in early 2019. During this period, the older structure's architecture and interior design will be upgraded to blend in with the style of the new section. Additional two level car parks will also be built, taking the mall's total number of parking spaces to 3,300 including outdoor bays. The number of screens at VOX Cinemas will be increased further, from nine to 14.

== Shopping ==
City Centre Ajman

The mall has 79 retail outlets. Anchor stores include a Carrefour hypermarket, a Centrepoint department store and a branch of Swedish fashion chain H&M, Luxury beauty retailer Areej, British retailer Early Learning Centre and sportswear chain Sun & Sand Sports. The other stores in the mall are fashion clothing, jewellery, watches, shoes, eyewear, perfumes and cosmetics, consumer electronics, and educational toys from British retailer Early Learning Centre. There is also a currency exchange (bureau de change), as well as Etisalat and Du telecoms outlets.

== Dining ==
City Centre Ajman houses 18 dining venues including the franchises Mado Café, Paul Café, Il Forno, Tim Horton's, Gérard Café, Starbucks, KFC, McDonald's and Cinnabon.

== Entertainment ==
The mall's VOX Cinemas multiplex is Ajman's only movie theatre. It features Max and 4DX viewing options and a screening room for children, and has seating for 1,369 people. The mall's VOX Cinemas multiplex is owned and operated by Majid Al Futtaim Cinemas, a subsidiary of Majid Al Futtaim Holding. Its theaters screen foreign language movies from Hollywood to Bollywood as well as Arabic-language movies and select independent films in various languages.

Magic Planet is a 1,466 sqm indoor family amusement arcade owned and operated by Majid Al Futtaim. At City Centre Ajman, it is situated next to the food court and houses traditional fairground-style rides such as a carousel and dodgems (‘bumper cars’) as well as video, skill and redemption games. There is also a soft play area.

== Industry recognition and awards ==
International Council of Shopping Centres (ICSC) 2016 Awards: Silver Award, New Media Excellence, Integrated Digital Campaign: Free Movie Night International Award: ICSC MAXI Merit for Community Relations (2006)

== Gallery ==
Palm Tree at City Centre Ajman

City Centre Ajman Mall

City Centre Ajman Dining

City Centre Ajman Nature
