= San Stefano Grand Plaza =

Building complex in Alexandria, Egypt

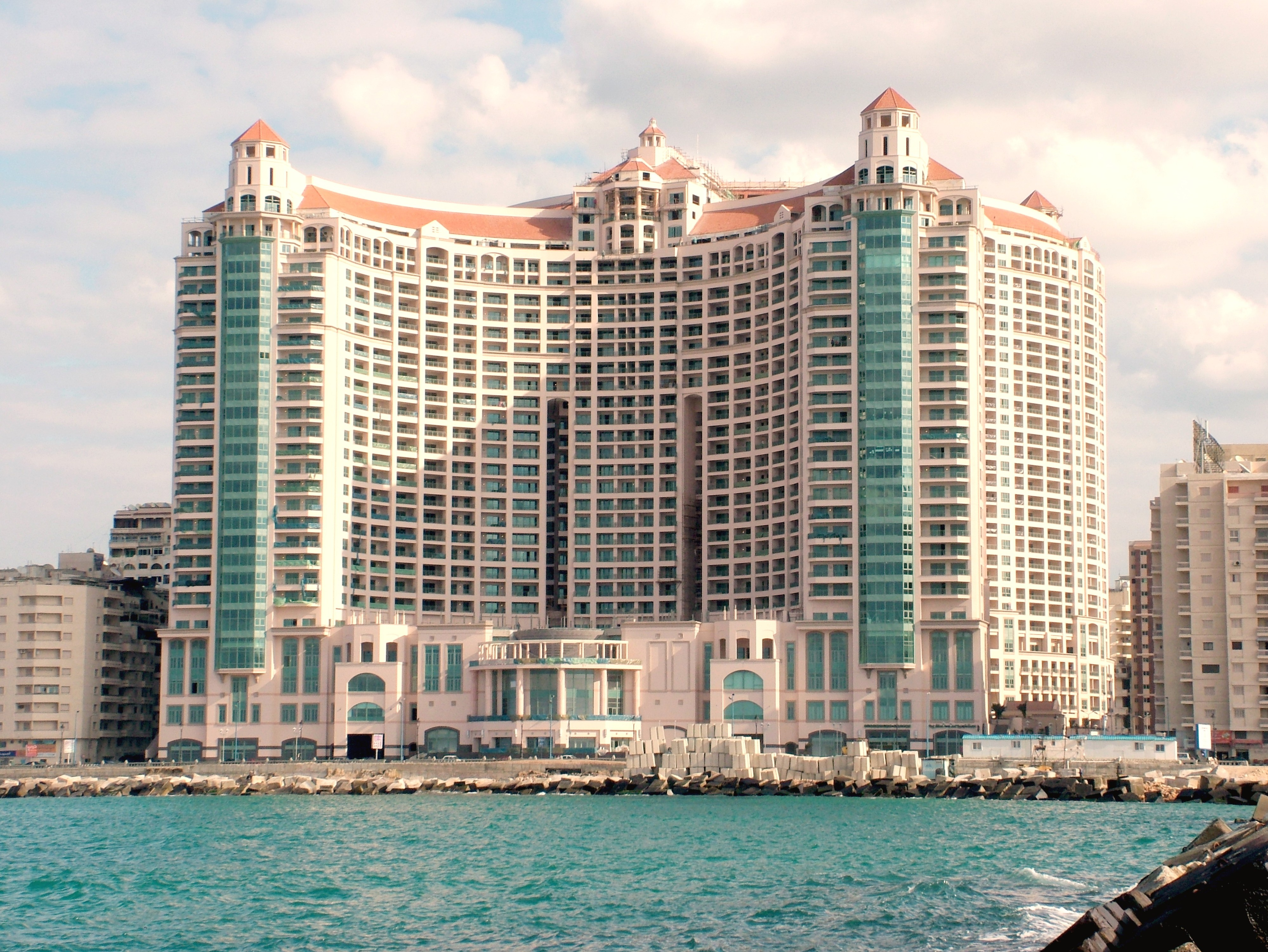
- Hotel chain: Four Seasons Hotels and Resorts

General information
- Location: Alexandria Corniche; Alexandria, Egypt
- Opened: 2007; 19 years ago
- Owner: Talaat Moustafa Group

Height
- Height: 135 m (443 ft)

Technical details
- Floor count: 32

Design and construction
- Architect: WZMH Architects
- Developer: Talaat Moustafa Group

San Stefano Grand Plaza (Egyptian Arabic: سان ستفانو جراند بلازا) is a structural complex including a hotel, apartments, offices, shopping mall and a marina in Alexandria, Egypt. The complex was designed by WZMH Architects.

Before the current complex was built, the site was occupied by the largest and most famous hotel in Alexandria in the early 20th century: the former San Stefano Hotel and Casino.

== Overview ==
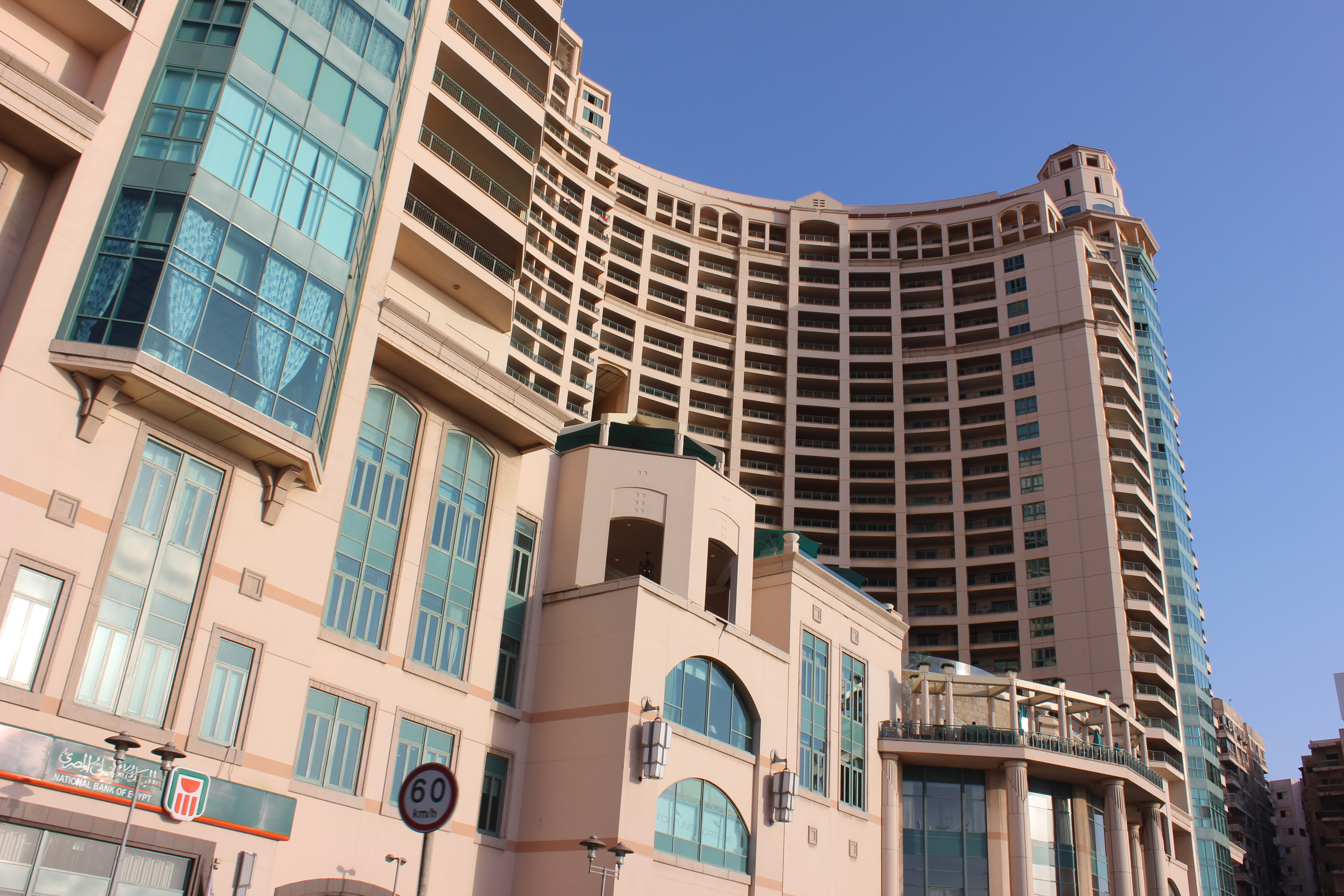
Close view

The old hotel was closed until it was sold to a private Egyptian real estate developer. It was demolished, and the current complex, San Stefano Grand Plaza, was built in its place. The new building hosts another luxury hotel, the Four Seasons Hotel Alexandria at San Stefano, a part of the Four Seasons chain. Most of the hotel's rooms are housed in the main building, but it also includes a ground-level, beachfront wing adjoining the Corniche for rooms under the Beach Suite and Villa category. The beachfront wing is connected to the main building by an underground tunnel.

In addition to the hotel, San Stefano includes a residential complex with a private parking garage and a large shopping center housing a collection of luxury boutiques and stores. It also has the largest cinema complex in the city. The building is the tallest in Alexandria, visible from areas far beyond the San Stefano district, and rises to a height of thirty stories. The San Stefano complex overlooks the Corniche and the San Stefano tram station.

== See also ==
- List of shopping malls in Egypt
