= Snejcom =

Indoor ski slope in Moscow

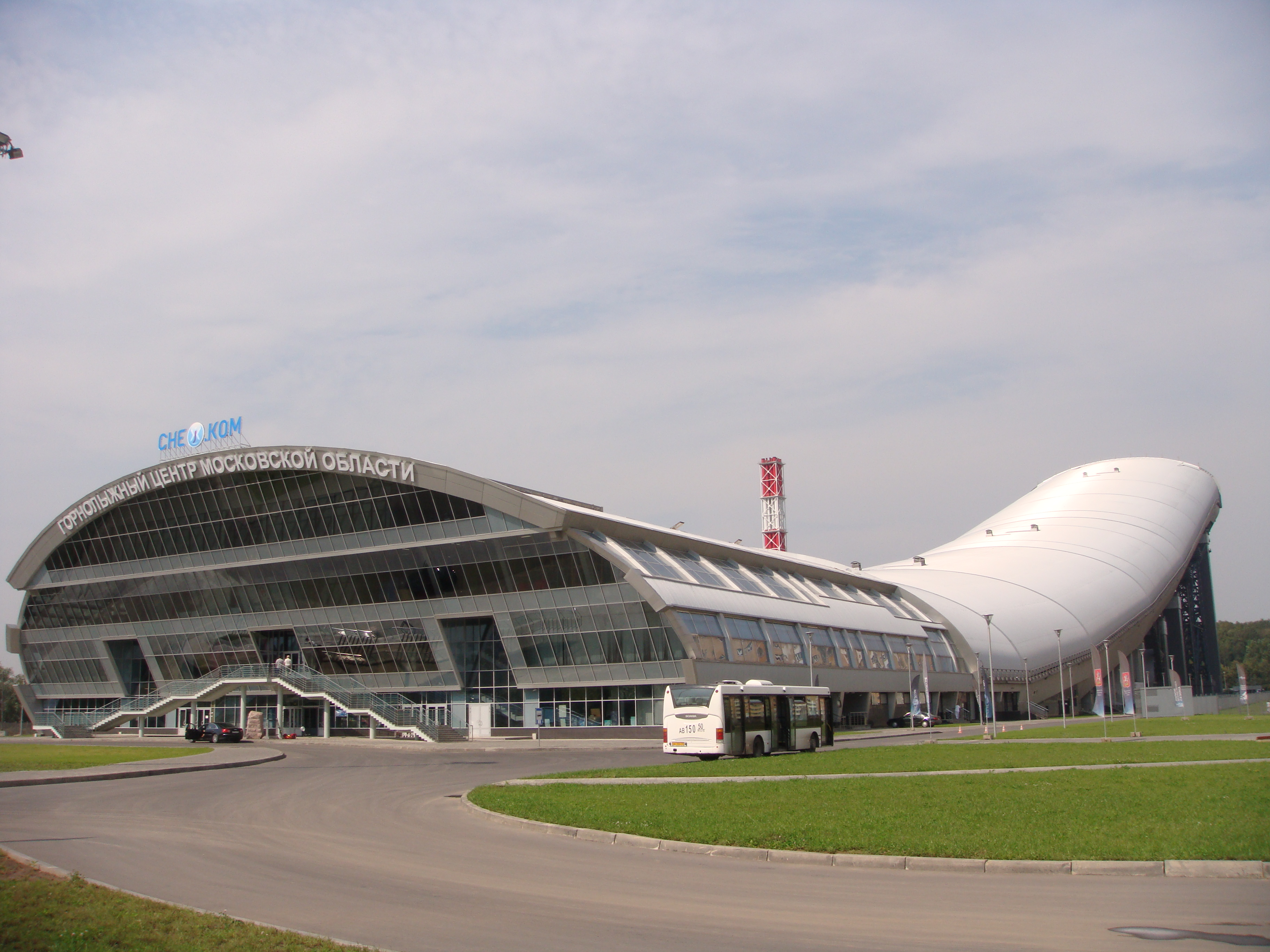
- Snejcom in 2016
- Interactive map of Snejcom
- Nearest city: Moscow
- Coordinates: 55°48′53″N 37°21′52″E
- Status: Defunct
- Opened: February 2008
- Closed: January 2022
- Website: snej.com

Snejcom (Russian: Снежком) was the largest year-round indoor ski resort in Europe, and the first and only one of its kind in Russia. It was located in the Pavshinskaya Poyma district of the city of Krasnogorsk. The complex was built in 2008. It was closed in 2022, and dismantling began in early 2023. The skating rink "Arena TsKhM" in South Tushino was renamed Snejcom.

== History ==
The idea to build a ski complex in the Pavshinskaya Poyma district appeared in 2004. According to Denis Kolokolnikov, managing partner of the RRG company, the key goal of the project was to increase the attractiveness of the area, which at that time was an empty field with no infrastructure. Snejcom was intended to become a unique engineering project with major investments expected to pay off in 15–20 years. Despite high risks, the decision was made to proceed with the project.

Construction of the ski complex began in 2004. The main builder and co-investor was the company SU-155. The complex officially opened in February 2008, with Moscow Region Governor Boris Gromov and Deputy Prime Minister Sergey Naryshkin in attendance.

== Characteristics ==
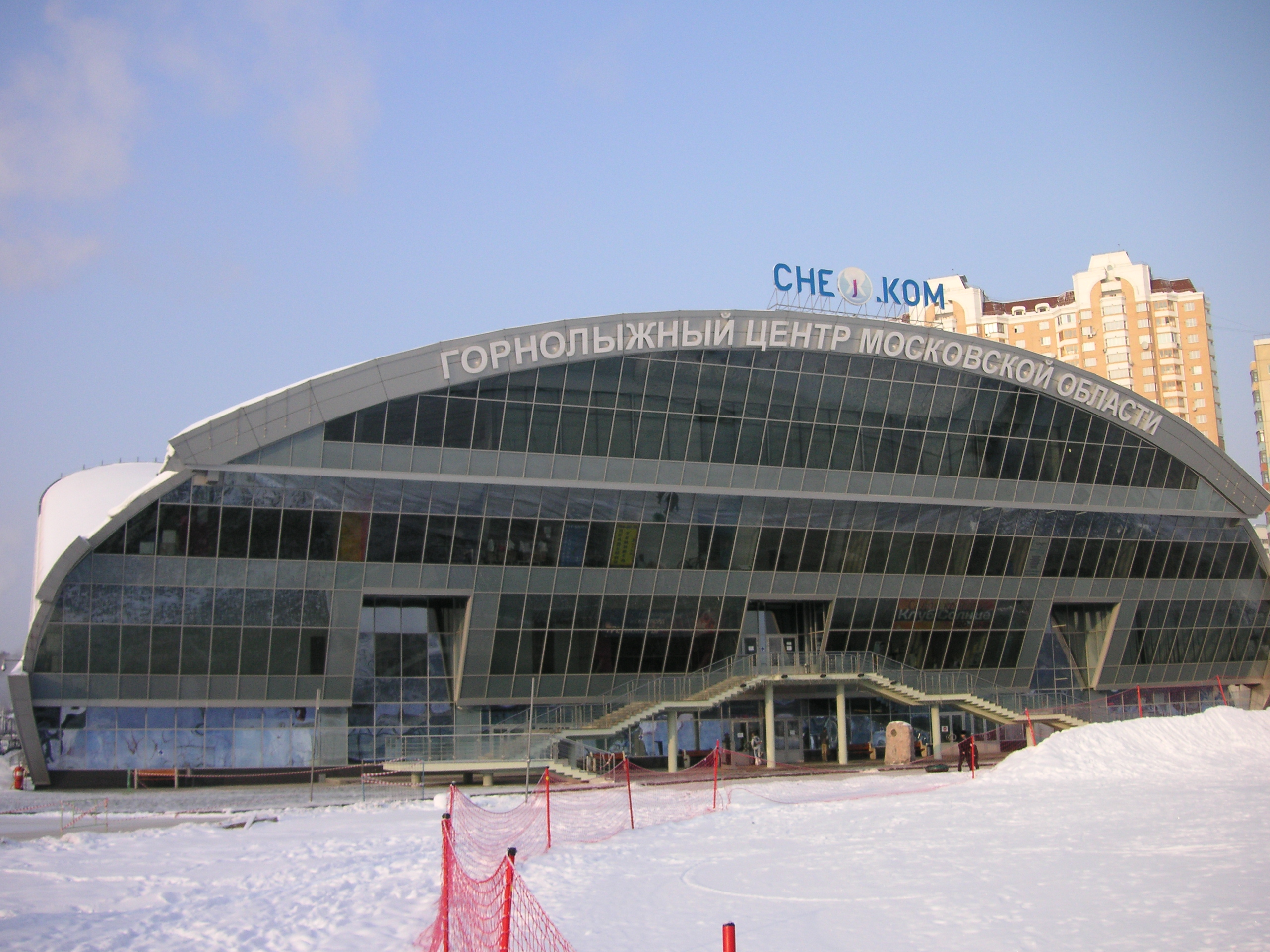
The main entrance of the ski complex, 2011

=== Ice and entertainment center ===
The ice and entertainment area included an ice rink, fitness center, aquatic zone with national-style baths, children's arcade machines, and a laser tag arena. The infrastructure also featured a conference hall, restaurants, sports shops, locker rooms, a sports equipment rental service, and a repair workshop.

=== Structural features ===
To conserve cold, all thermal bridges were located outside the cold zone. The ski hall was designed in the shape of an ellipse, which enclosed the thermal bridges and shielded the ceiling panels from solar radiation.

=== Snow ===
Snow in the complex was produced using the "ice-crash" system (snow chips) by grinding ice plates into snow in a special icemaker with a daily capacity of 90 tons. The shredded snow was transported to the slope through pipes. The "ice-crash" technology maintained comfortable climatic conditions. The snow cover reached a thickness of 50 cm, and the total weight of the snow on the slope was nearly 5 tons.

=== Slope ===
The artificial slope was 365 meters long and 60 meters wide, making it one of the longest indoor slopes in the world, covering an area of 24,000 square meters. The vertical drop reached 65 meters. There was also a training slope with a 54-meter lift, a snowboard park, and a steep slope reserved for advanced skiers.

Two snowcats operated on the slope, compacting the artificial snow. The snowcats were equipped with exhaust gas cleaning systems.

=== Snowboard park ===
The year-round snowboard park "SNEJ.COM" was located within the complex. It featured elements such as a down rail, cannon spine, down-flat-down box, down-flat-down rail, flat plastic rail, flat box, and multibox (including wallrides and spine).

=== Climate of the snow zone ===
A stable climate was maintained on the slope regardless of outside weather. Air temperature ranged from −5 to −7 °C, and humidity was 65%. The complex simulated an Alpine climate with 56 coolers that also dehumidified the air. They circulated up to 10,000 cubic meters of air per hour, cooling and freezing moisture on the heat exchanger surface, delivering fresh air, and regulating temperature, cooling in summer and slightly heating in winter if the outside temperature dropped below −10 °C. They also expelled used cold air.

Beneath the snow cover was a massive platform cooled by a network of plastic pipes approximately 100 km long, circulating a coolant. The coolant was continuously frozen in a special unit functioning as a giant refrigerator, cooling about 150 tons of antifreeze per day. This system consumed one megawatt of electricity, which is comparable to the power needs of a city with a population of 3,000.

During the heatwave of 2010, many people visited Snejcom to escape the extreme heat and smog in Moscow.

=== Atrium ===
The leisure area of the complex was separated from the slope by a special glass partition capable of withstanding temperature differences of up to 300 degrees. This design allowed for a winter climate on the slope and a summer climate in the atrium. The atrium housed a conference hall, restaurants, shops, and a gym for ski and snowboard training.

== Closure ==
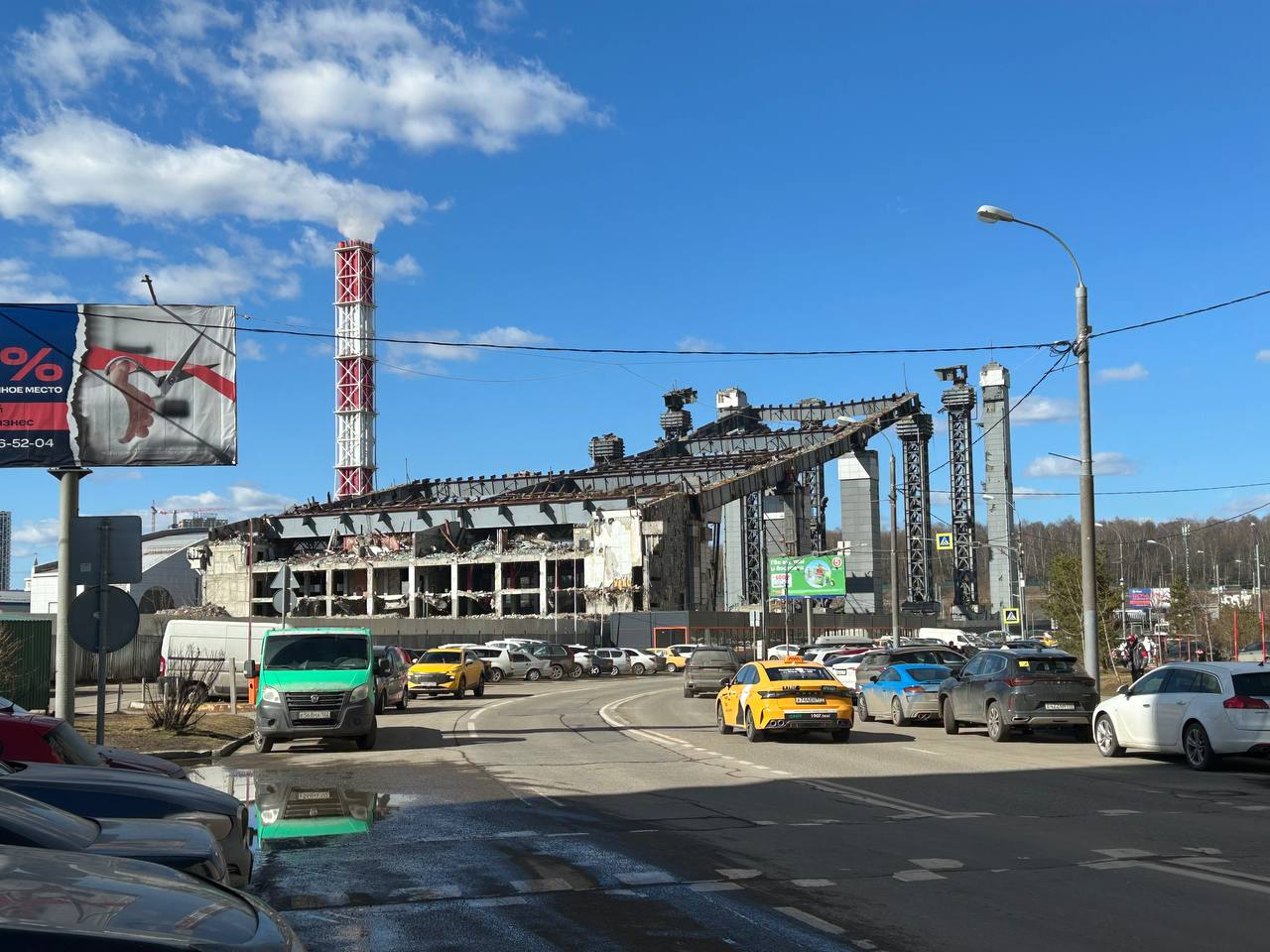
The ski complex is in the final stage of dismantling. March 20, 2025

In 2015, Sberbank and other creditors filed a lawsuit against SU-155 for loan defaults. In April 2016, the Moscow Arbitration Court declared the SU-155 group bankrupt. However, Snejcom continued to operate.

In September 2017, Snejcom was put up for auction but remained open for operations.

In January 2022, it was announced that Snejcom would close "for reconstruction", though no timeframe was provided. By the end of 2022, plans were announced to dismantle the ski slope by late 2024, however, at the time of the end of 2025, the dismantling work was still not completed.

== See also ==
- Ski Dubai
