= Opera cake =

French almond cake with chocolate and coffee fillings

Opera cake (Gâteau opéra)
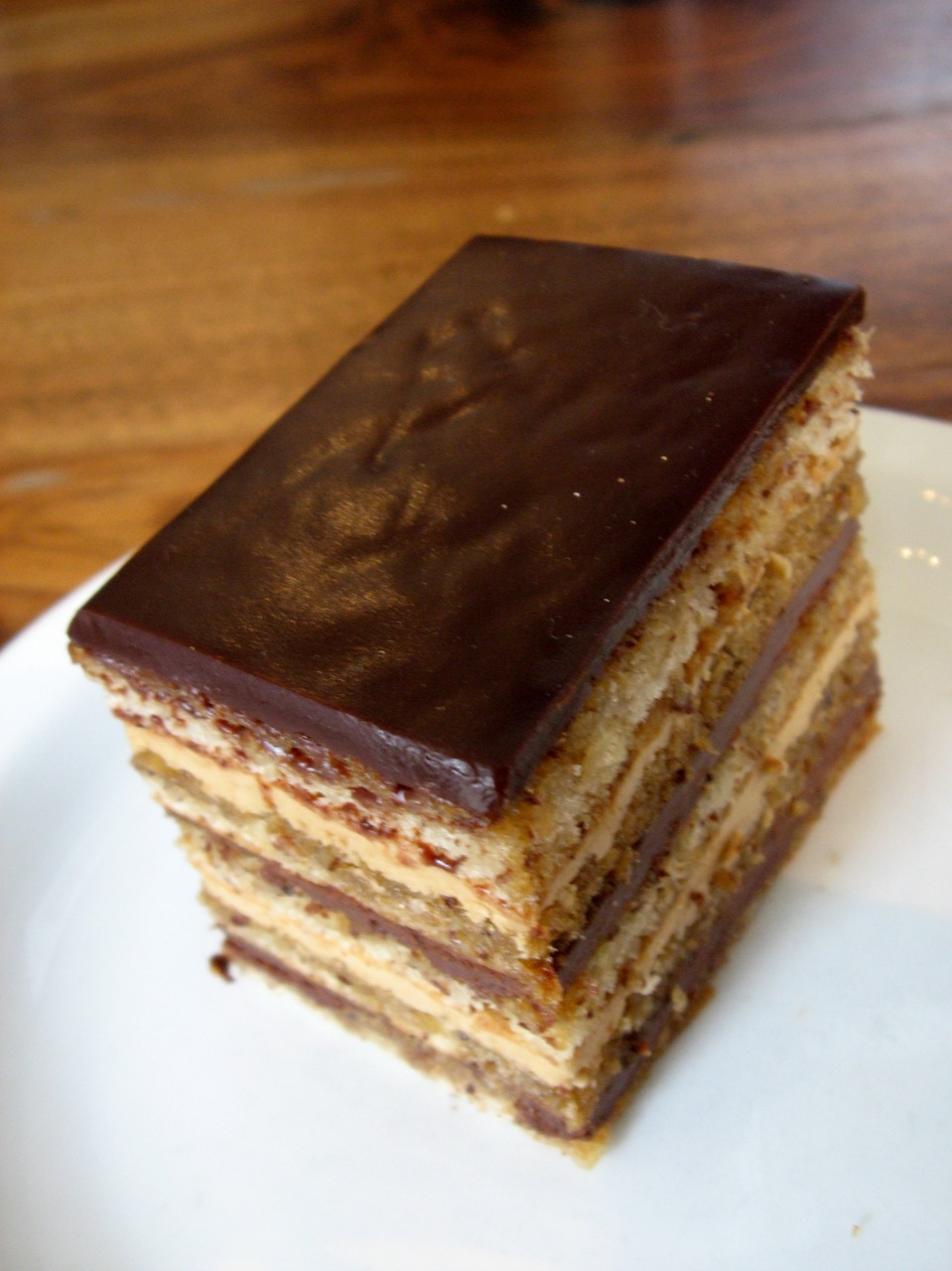
- Type: Cake
- Place of origin: France
- Created by: Cyriaque Gavillon
- Main ingredients: Sponge cake, coffee syrup, ganache, coffee buttercream, chocolate glaze

Opera cake (French: Gâteau opéra) is a French cake. It is made with layers of almond sponge cake (known as Joconde in French) soaked in coffee syrup (or Grand Marnier), layered with ganache and coffee-flavoured French buttercream, and covered in a chocolate glaze. Its name originates from its layers resembling the levels of an opera house.

According to Larousse Gastronomique, "Opéra gâteau is an elaborate almond sponge cake with a coffee and chocolate filling and icing." Edible gold leaf is sometimes added to the presentation.

== Origin ==
The cake was popularized by the French pâtisserie house Dalloyau, but its origin is unclear. Cyriaque Gavillon claimed to have created the cake there in 1955 and that his wife Andrée Gavillon named it after the Opéra Garnier.

Gaston Lenôtre (1920–2009) claimed he invented the dessert in 1960.

== See also ==
- List of French desserts
- Tiramisu
