= VOX Cinemas =

Cinema company

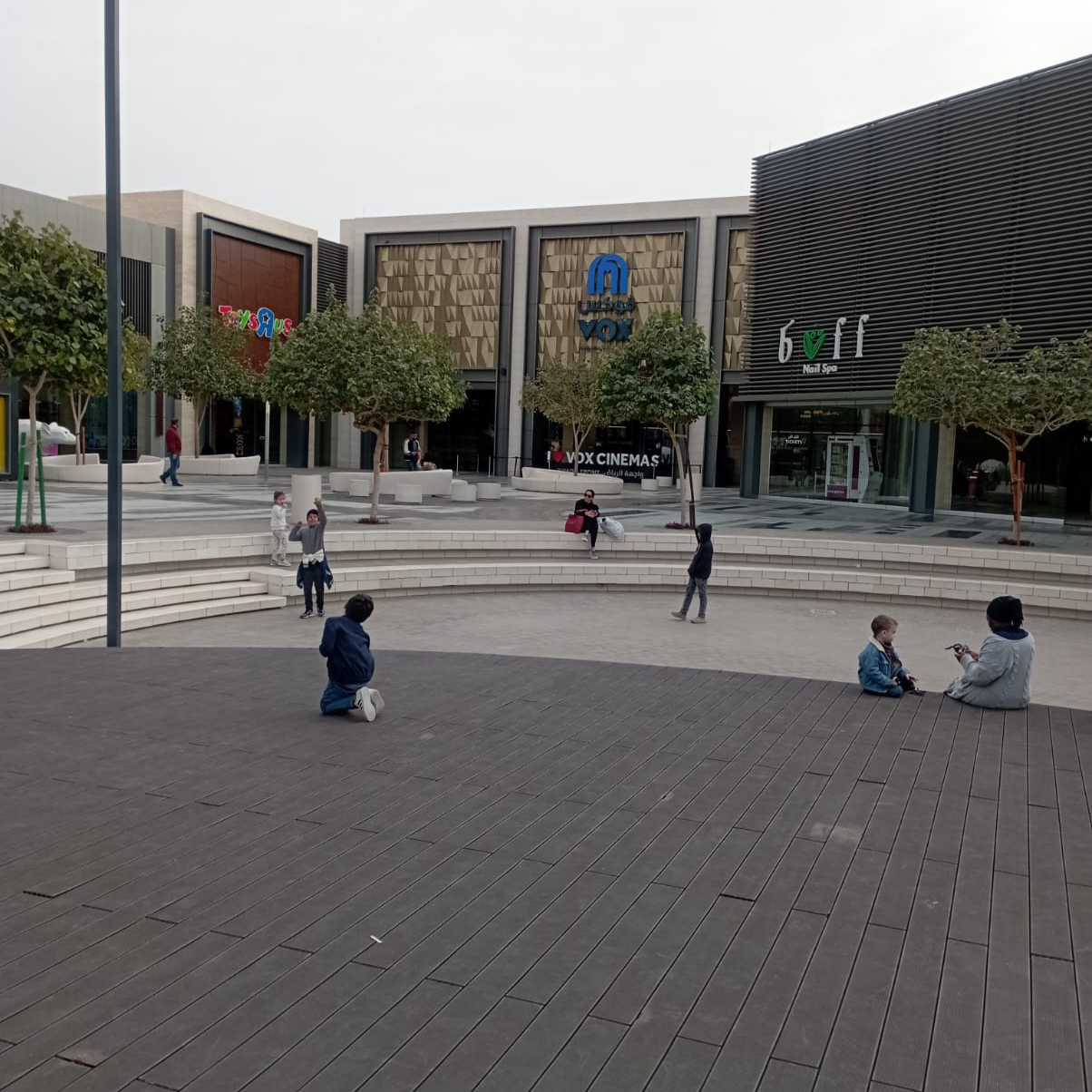
- VOX Cinemas (center) at Riyadh Front in Riyadh, Saudi Arabia
- Type: Private
- Industry: Entertainment (movie theaters)
- Founded: September 13, 1999; 26 years ago Dubai, UAE
- Founder: Majid Al Futtaim
- Headquarters: Dubai, UAE
- Key people: Ahmed Galal Ismail (CEO, Ventures)
- Products: VOX Theatres
- Owner: Majid Al Futtaim
- Website: VOX Cinemas

VOX Cinemas is a movie theatre chain operating in the Middle East administered by the UAE-based Majid Al Futtaim Group. Majid Al Futtaim has 573 cinema screens across the UAE, Qatar, Lebanon, Egypt, Oman, Bahrain, Saudi Arabia and Kuwait under the VOX Cinemas brand.

The VOX Cinemas in the Mall of the Emirates is considered as the flagship venture featuring 24 screens – including an IMAX with Laser, VOX 4DX auditorium, a luxury cinema experience called “THEATRE by Rhodes” and VOX Kids. The 100,000sq ft venue is considered the largest complex in the Middle East after its re-launch on September 28, 2015.

It is located in the new expansion area at Mall of the Emirates level 2 and consists of 24-screens. VOX has fifteen locations in the United Arab Emirates, located at Marina Mall, Yas Mall, Mall of the Emirates, City Centre Deira, Mirdif, Me'aisem, Ajman, Fujairah, Mercato Mall, Burjuman, Shindagha, Cineplex at Hyatt, Al Hamra Mall and VOX Outdoor at Galleria Mall. VOX also has 44 screens in Oman, 15 screens in Lebanon's City Centre Beirut and 28 screens in Egypt, 21 screens in Mall of Egypt, 7 in city center Alexandria and they are building a 16 cinema screens complex at city center almaza and 4 screens in Saudi Arabia. Recently VOX Cinemas also expanded to Kuwait with its first cinema into the Avenues Phase 4 in 2018.

At the end of 2019, Vox Cinemas, part of the Majid Al Futtaim Entertainment group, expects to open a multi-screen venue at the Wafi Mall in Dubai. In January 2019, Vox cinemas opens its doors in Jeddah at the Red Sea Mall. After decades of cinema ban, Cameron Mitchell, CEO of Majid Al Futtaim Cinemas, said that MAF is contributing to the Saudi Vision 2030, and the group announces in January 2019 Vox's rollout of 300 new screens in the Kingdom within 18 months as part of a $4 billion investment plan.
