= City Centre Fujairah =

- Location: Fujairah City, Fujairah, United Arab Emirates
- Coordinates: 25°7′32″N 56°18′5″E
- Address: Sheikh Khalifa Highway
- Opened: April 2012
- Developer: Majid Al Futtaim Group
- Owner: Majid Al Futtaim Group
- Num. of stores: 105
- Floor area: 34,000 m^{2} (370,000 sq ft)
- Floors: 2
- Parking: 1,000
- Website: citycentrefujairah.com

City Centre Fujairah (Arabic: سيتي سنتر الفجيرة) is a shopping mall located in Fujairah City, Fujairah, United Arab Emirates, developed by Majid Al Futtaim Properties in partnership with the government-owned Fujairah Investment Establishment. City Centre Fujairah opened in April 2012, and has 34,000 m^{2} (370,000 sq ft) of retail space and includes 105 mid-market brands, 85% of which are new to Fujairah.

The mall houses a Carrefour hypermarket with 8,684 m^{2} (93,470 sq ft), 24 international food & beverage outlets, and a 13-unit food court.

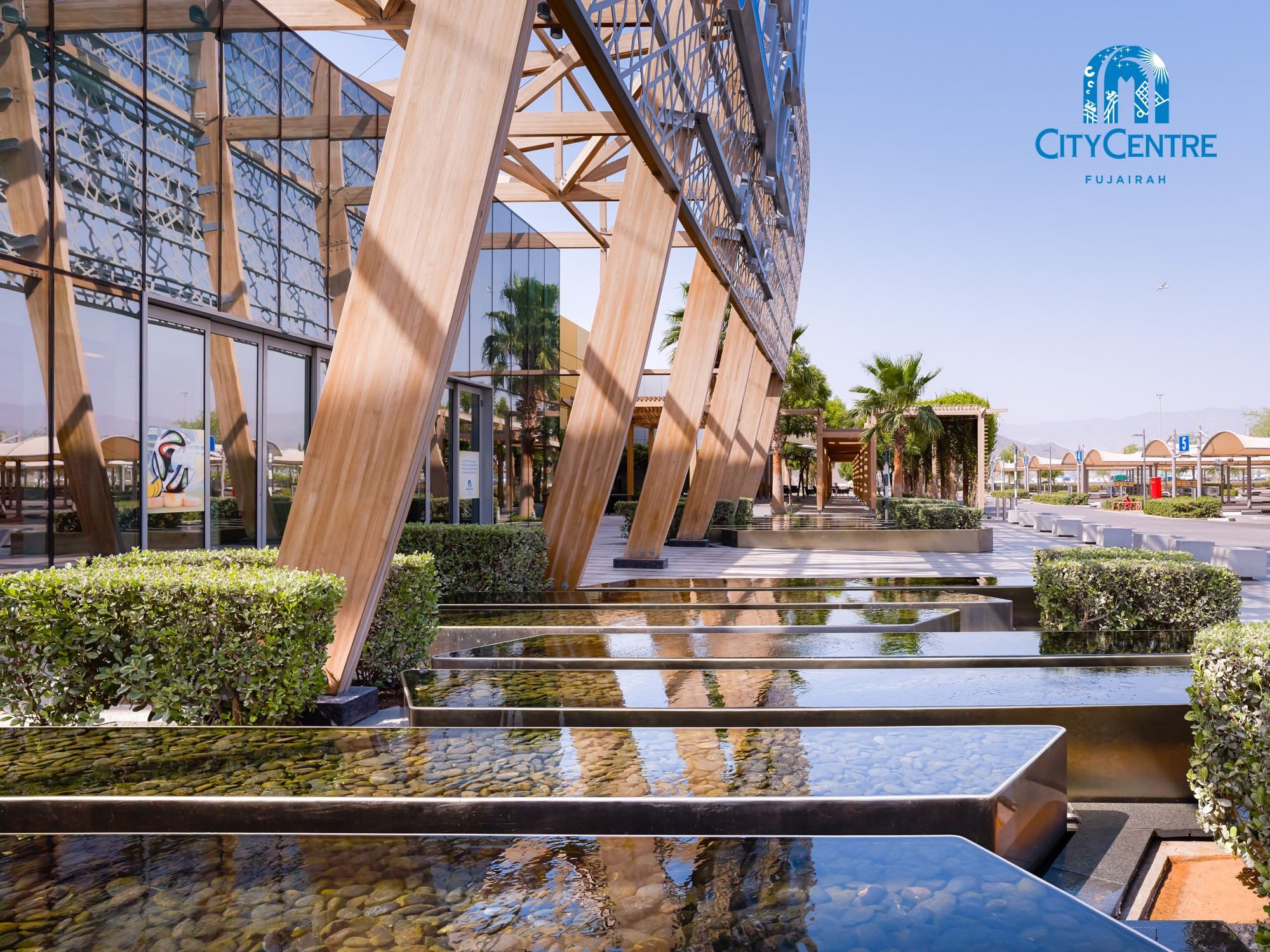
Main entrance of City Centre Fujairah

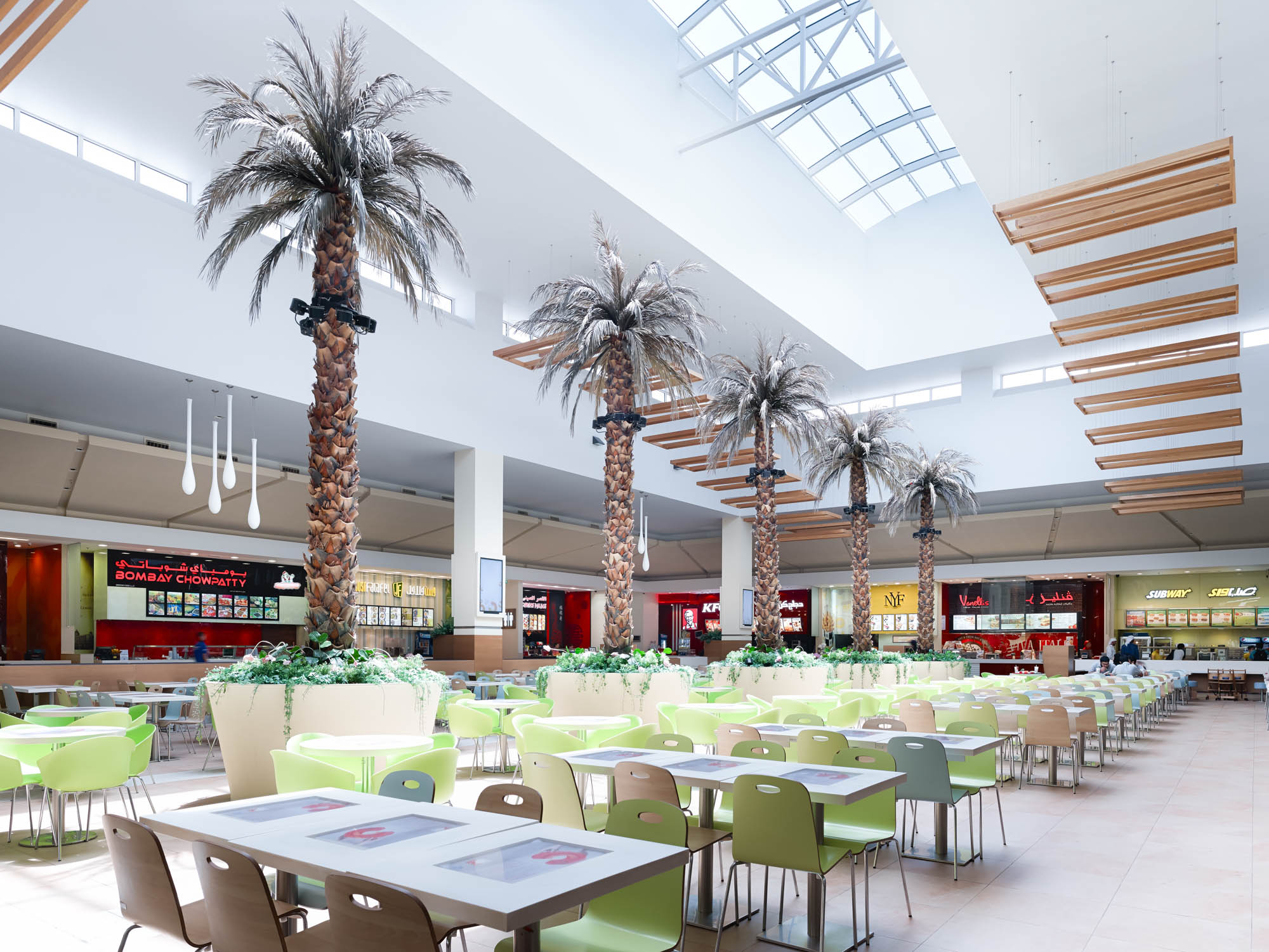
Food court at City Centre Fujairah

== Entertainment ==
- Magic Planet is a 1,325-square metre family entertainment centre that features the latest simulators, video games and theme rides for children.
- VOX Cinemas is an 11- screen cinema offering high-resolution 4K digital projection. VOX Cinemas is the cinema arm of Majid Al Futtaim Ventures, a division of the Majid Al Futtaim Group, well known in the Middle East shopping mall and leisure sector.
- Starbucks
- Max
- Axiom Telecom, one of the technology retailers within Fujairah
- Centre Point

== Environmental sustainability ==
City Centre Fujairah is a LEED-registered project and currently targeting a Gold LEED rating under the USGBC Green Building Guidelines as an eco-friendly building.
