= Ski Dubai =

Indoor ski slope in Dubai

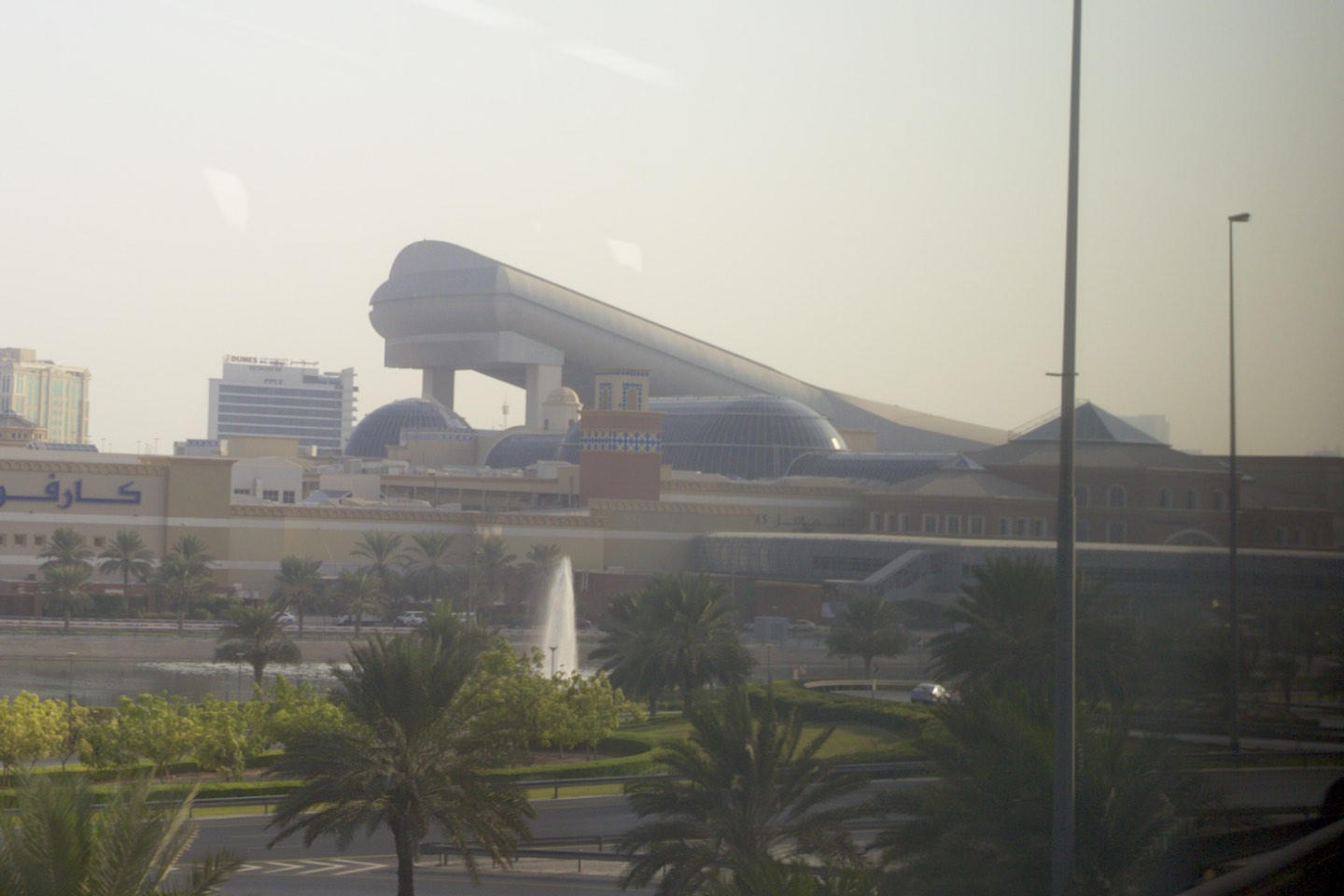
- An exterior view in 2011
- Interactive map of Ski Dubai
- Nearest city: Dubai
- Coordinates: 25°07′02″N 55°11′54″E
- Opened: November 1, 2005
- Vertical: 85 metres (279 ft)
- Trails: 5
- Longest run: 0.4 kilometres (0.25 mi)
- Lift system: 3 (2 tow bar, 1 four-person chairlift)
- Terrain parks: Yes
- Website: skidxb.com/en-ae/ski-dubai

Ski Dubai is an indoor ski resort with 22,500 square meters of indoor ski area. The park maintains a temperature of −1 to 2 °C (30 to 36 °F) throughout the year. It is a part of the Mall of the Emirates, one of the largest shopping malls in the world, located in Dubai, United Arab Emirates. It was developed by Majid Al Futtaim Group, which also operates the Mall of the Emirates.

Opened in November 2005, the indoor resort features an 85-metre (279 ft) high indoor mountain (equivalent to a 25-story building) with 5 slopes of varying steepness and difficulty, including a 400-metre (1,300 ft) long run, the world's first indoor black diamond run, and various features (boxes, rails, kickers) that are changed on a regular basis. A chairlift and a tow lift carry skiers and snowboarders up the mountain. Equipment such as skis and jackets are provided with the ticket and one can buy equipment in the nearby stores. Adjoining the slopes is a 3,000-square-metre (32,000 sq ft) Snow Park play area comprising sled and toboggan runs, an icy body slide, climbing towers, giant snowballs and an ice cave. Ski Dubai was nominated amongst 10 internationally-recognized indoor ski resorts across Egypt, Germany, China, Spain, Scotland, New Zealand and Netherlands. Launched in 2005, Ski Dubai was the first indoor ski resort in the Middle East and quickly established itself as one of the region’s most popular and iconic attractions. Ski Dubai also houses a number of penguins who are let out of their enclosures several times a day. Penguin encounters can be booked, allowing the public to interact directly with the penguins.

In 2007 Ski Dubai was awarded the Thea Outstanding Achievement Award by the Themed Entertainment Association. Ski Dubai was designed by Acer Snowmec (part of the 360 Group and designers of the largest indoor ski centre in the world, Harbin Indoor Ski Centre). Acer Snowmec also provides the patented snow making technology to the centre. The Snow Play Area was designed and produced by Thinkwell Group.

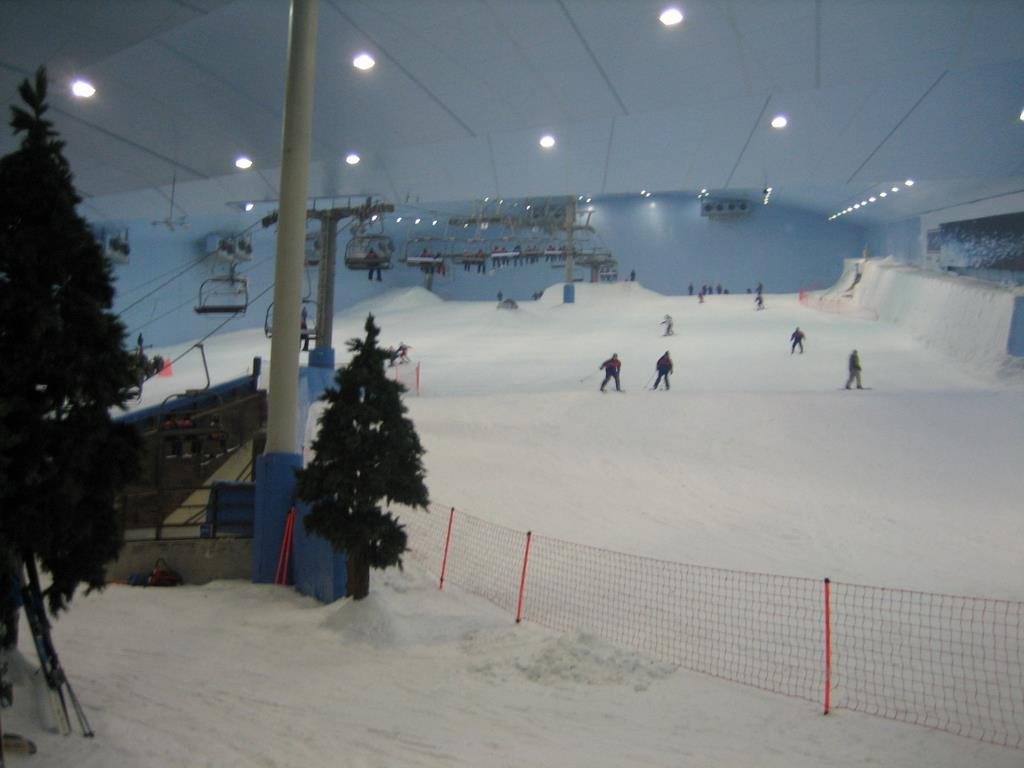
Looking up the ski slope in 2006

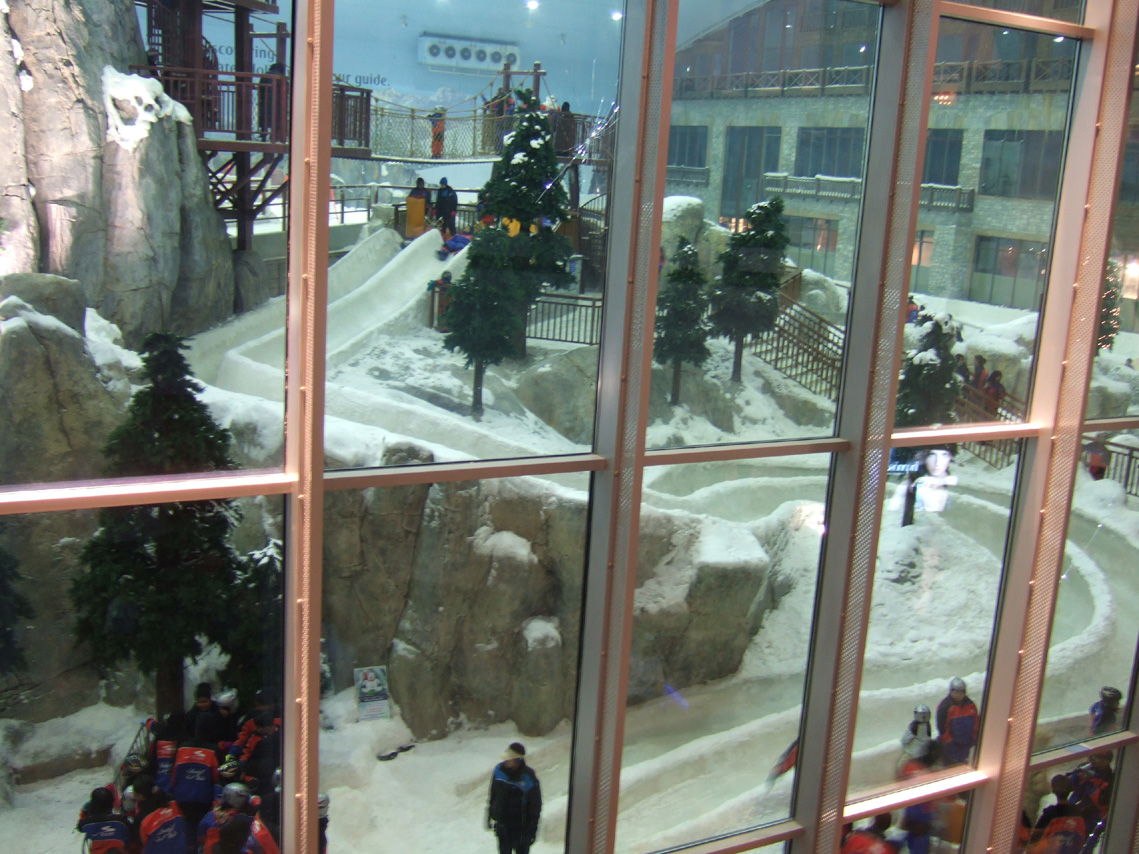
Looking in from the outside in 2007

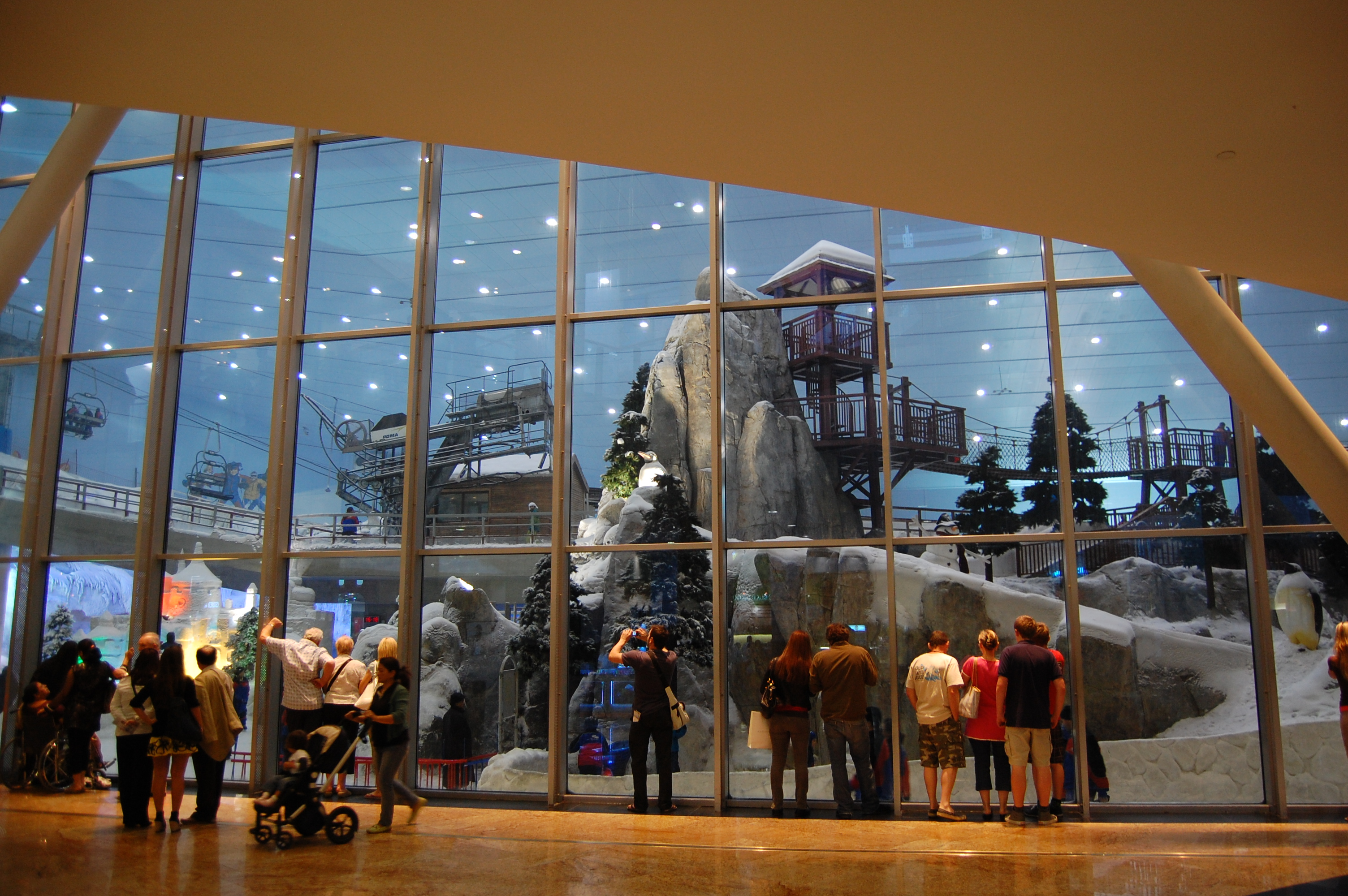
Ski Dubai slope from inside Mall of Emirates in 2011

== See also ==
- Snejcom
- SnOasis
- SSAWS
- Tourist attractions in Dubai
