= Town Square (Dubai) =

Residential development project

Town Square is a mega project launched in Dubai in early March 2015. Located along Al Qudra Road, the development is 750 acres in size and will eventually consist of 3,000 townhouses and 18,000 apartments. According to the developer, NSHAMA, the entire project will be built over 10 years. The development will consist of a central public space the size of 16 football fields, over 500 retail outlets, a cinema to be managed by Reel Cinemas and a Vida Hotel.
