= Dalloyau =

French food company

Coordinates: 48.8723°N 2.3118°E

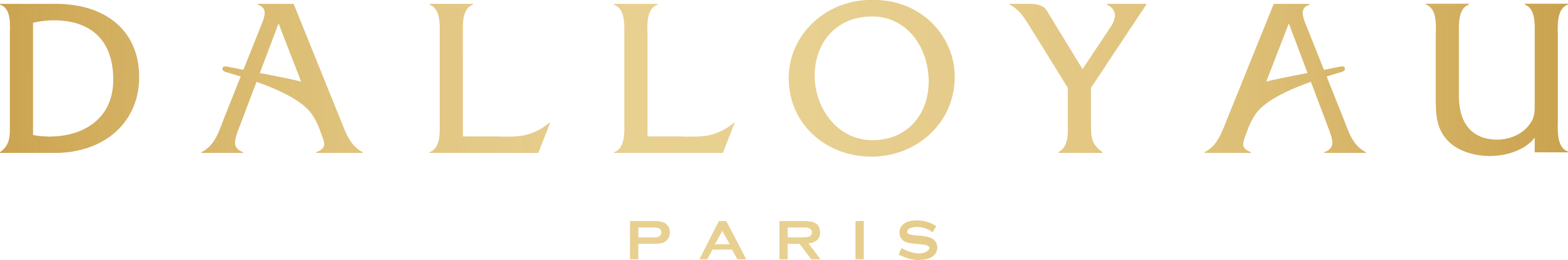

- Branch in Pacific Place, Hong Kong
- Type: Private
- Industry: Bakery
- Founded: 1682; 344 years ago
- Headquarters: Paris, France
- Number of locations: 11 points of sale in France; 2 private reception areas; 28 international locations; (2016)
- Key people: Nadine Gavillon-Bernardé (CEO)
- Products: Opera cake

Dalloyau (French pronunciation: [dalwajo]) is a Paris-based food company founded in 1682. Dalloyau is a family-owned and independent business. In 1993, Nadine Gavillon-Bernardé became the company's CEO. Since 2001, the company is a member of the "Comité Colbert". Dalloyau opened its first shop abroad in 1982 in Tokyo. By 2009, Dalloyau had opened 31 shops.

== History ==
In 1682, Charles Dalloyau worked for Louis XIV. Dalloyau and his brothers worked for the Court as "Officiers de bouche", the highest French gastronomy distinction at the time. In 1802, Jean-Baptiste Dalloyau founded the "Dalloyau, house of gastronomy". He settled in Paris at rue du Faubourg Saint-Honoré, the current address of Dalloyau's main Paris shop.

== Opera Cake: Dalloyau's most famous pastry ==
This cake was invented in 1955 by Cyriaque Gavillon from Dalloyau. He wanted to create a new cake shape with visible layers and for which only one bite would give the whole cake's taste. It is his spouse, Andrée Gavillon, that named it "Opéra" in tribute to the auditorium of the Palais Garnier. The Opera is a rectangular cake composed of three thin layers of almond sponge cake soaked in coffee syrup alternating between layers of coffee butter cream and chocolate glaze topped with ganache.

== Points of sale ==
In 2016, Dalloyau has eleven points of sale in France: 10 in Ile-de-France and one in Marseille.

Dalloyau also has two private reception areas: the Petit-Palais in Domaine de Chantilly and the Domaine de Vert-Mont in Rueil-Malmaison. Abroad, Dalloyau opened its first overseas boutique in 1982 in Tokyo, Japan. Since 2018, Dalloyau runs a network of franchises with 28 stores and corners abroad: twenty in Japan, four in Hong Kong, three in South Korea, two in Dubai, and two in Baku.

== Sources ==
- Le grand Larousse gastronomique, 2007, page 595
- Archives of the "Château de Chantilly"
- Laurent Baudoin, historian
- Dominique Michel, food historian
