= City Centre Maadi =

Shopping mall in Cairo, Egypt

Coordinates: 29.9825607°N 31.3162377°E

City Centre Maadi is located on the Katameya highway in Cairo, Egypt, where it opened in December 2002. It is developed and managed by Majid Al Futtaim Properties. Home to over 86 retail stores, City Centre Maadi has a gross trading area of 65,000 square meters including anchor stores such as Centrepoint.
