= Mall of Egypt =

Shopping mall in 6th of October, Egypt

- Location: 6th of October, Egypt
- Coordinates: 29.971702°N 31.017132°E
- Opened: March 2, 2017; 9 years ago
- Owner: Majid Al Futtaim (MAF Holding)
- Num. of stores: 600+
- Parking: 6500
- Website: www.mallofegypt.com

Mall of Egypt (Arabic: مول مصر) is a shopping mall in 6th of October, Giza Governorate, Egypt, about 32 km west of central Cairo. It is the first shopping destination of its kind in Egypt. The mall is owned and managed by the Majid Al Futtaim Group, operating across the Middle East and North Africa region. Mall of Egypt is located on Al Wahat Road in 6th of October. With a Gross Leasable Area (GLA) of 165,000 square meters, Mall of Egypt houses some local and international retailers. Moreover, the mall will house major department stores as well as other fashion, lifestyle, sports, electronics, fine dining and home furnishing outlets. With direct access to Wahat Road, the mall includes 6,500 car parking spaces. Mall of Egypt’s family leisure services include Ski Egypt (Africa’s first indoor skiing slope), a 21 multi-screen VOX Cinemas and a Magic Planet family entertainment centre. The mall, worth 6 billion EGP, officially opened in March 2017.
