= City Centre Mirdif =

City Centre Mirdif, Dubai

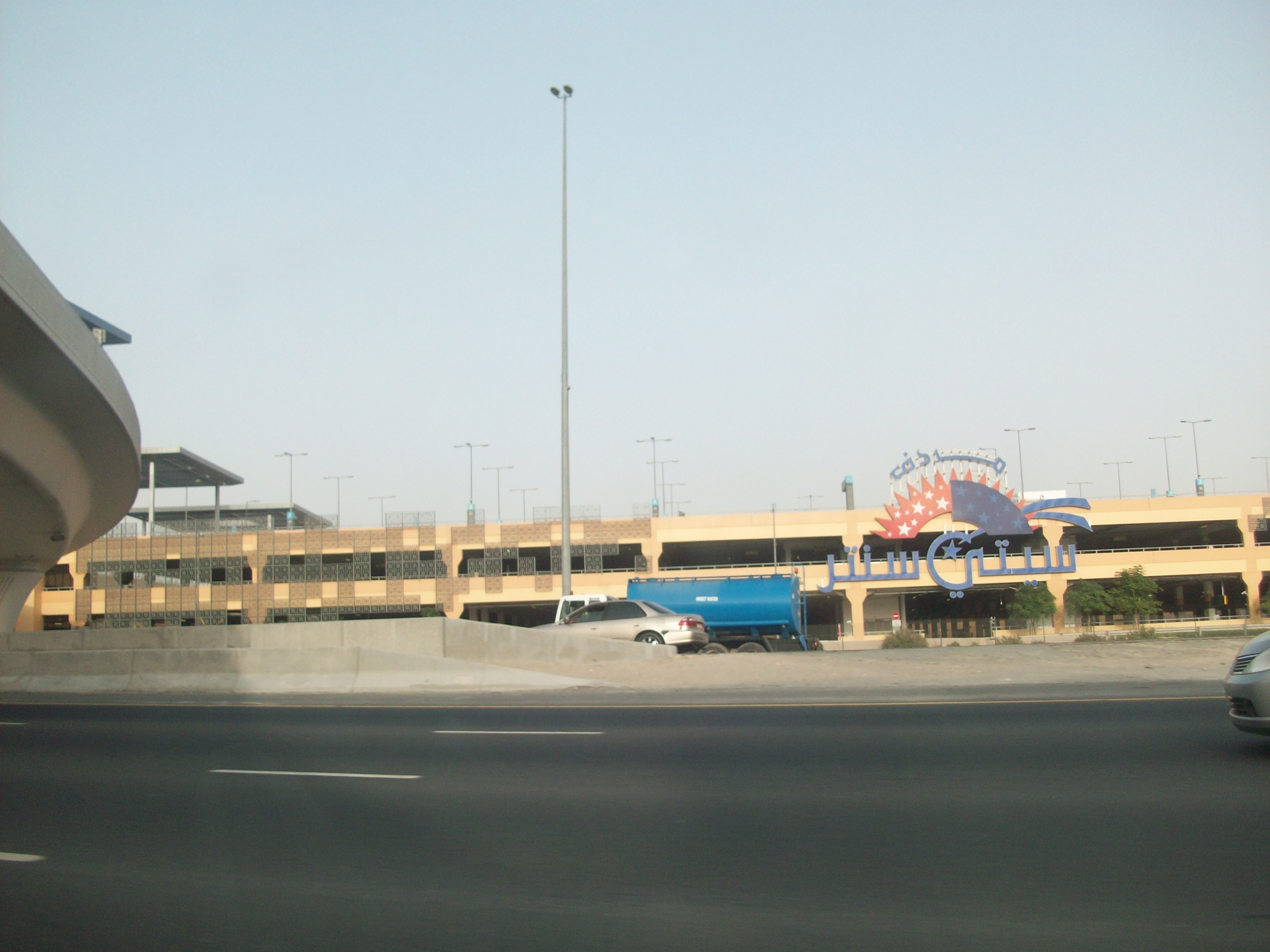
- View from Sheikh Mohammed Bin Zayed Road
- Location: Mirdif, Dubai, United Arab Emirates
- Coordinates: 25.2162788°N 55.4074001°E
- Opened: 26 March 2010; 16 years ago
- Developer: Majid Al Futtaim Properties
- Manager: MAF Dalkia
- Owner: Majid Al Futtaim (MAF Holding)
- Architect: RTKL, and Holford Associates
- Num. of stores: 430-450
- Num. of anchor tenants: 8
- Floor area: 5,900,000 square feet (550,000 m^{2})
- Floors: 2
- Parking: 7,000
- Website: citycentremirdif.com

City Centre Mirdif is a shopping mall in the residential area of Mirdif, in Dubai, United Arab Emirates. It opened on 26 March 2010, and is developed and managed by Majid Al Futtaim Properties. City Centre Mirdif has a gross leasable area of 196,000 m^{2} and houses 465 retail stores.

== Stores ==
Stores at the City Centre Mirdif include ARMANI EXCHANGE, Emax (electronics retailer), Hamleys (toy retailer), Clas Ohlson (home improvement store), Boots, Areej (cosmetics and perfumes), VaVaVoom (beauty products and fragrances), Nayomi (lingerie), Nine West, Karen Millen, New Look, Miss Selfridge, H&M, American Eagle Outfitters, Zara, Pierre Cardin, Max Value, The North Face, Timberland, Armani Jeans, Hackett (British designer menswear), Sun & Sand Sports, Nike, Early Learning Centre, Destination Maternity (maternity fashion and accessories), Mothercare, Mamas & Papas, BHS Kids, Marina (home furnishings), Lakeland (kitchenware), Virgin Megastore, Jumbo Electronics, Bose, Canon, Etisalat, Paris Gallery (offering fragrances), JD Sports.

== Dining ==
City Centre Mirdif houses over 80 restaurants and cafés. Restaurants include Abdel Wahab, Uno Pizzeria & Grill, Japengo, Texas Roadhouse, and Gazebo. Two food courts offer 34 outlets, restaurant precincts, coffee shops and casual dining.

== VOX Cinemas ==
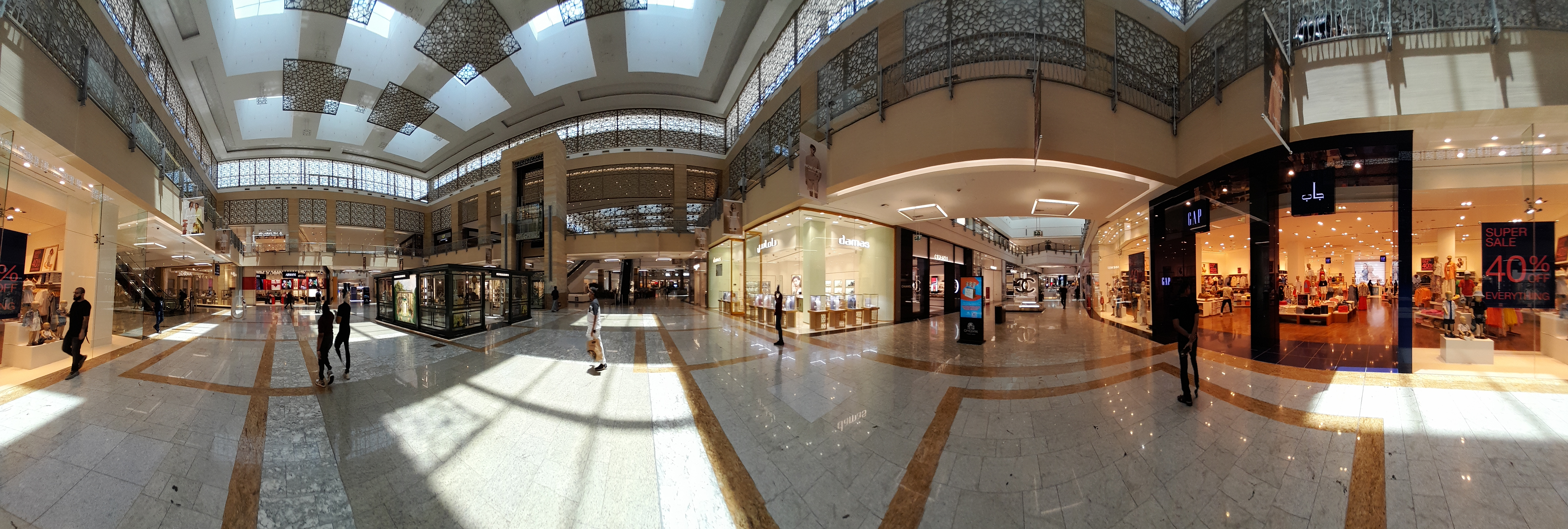
Mirdif mall

A 10-screen cinema featuring two VOX GOLD Premium screens with VOX GOLD lounge and VOX 4DX sensory experience.

== Transportation and Parking ==
=== Blue Line Metro Construction & Traffic Diversions ===
Road closures and traffic diversions began near the mall as part of construction for the planned Dubai Metro Blue Line, which will add a new station at City Centre Mirdif. Roads between 5th and 8th Streets have been rerouted, with a temporary U‑turn introduced near Ghoroob Square to ease access

Starting January 1, 2025, City Centre Mirdif rolled out a barrier-free, license plate recognition (ANPR) parking system. Operated by Parkin Company, this system allows seamless entry and exit without physical barriers—visitors receive an SMS or in-app notification with payment details. Parking fees remain unchanged under a five-year management contract.

== See also ==
- List of shopping malls in Dubai
