= City Centre Alexandria =

Shopping mall in Egypt

- Type: Private company
- Industry: Retail
- Genre: Shopping Mall
- Founded: 2003
- Headquarters: Alexandria, Egypt
- Website: www.citycentrealexandria.com

City Centre Alexandria is a shopping mall located in Alexandria, Egypt, where it opened on 23 January 2003. It was developed and is managed by Majid Al Futtaim Properties. Home to over 160 retail stores, Alexandria City Centre has a gross trading area of 60,370 square meters including anchor stores such as Debenhams, Zara, Max and H&M and 14,771 square meter Carrefour Hypermarket.

== Dining ==
City Centre Alexandria houses over 25 restaurants and cafes, including an international food court which was revamped in summer 2013 to include over 10 outlets.

== Entertainment ==
- Magic Planet

Magic Planet is a popular family entertainment centre in the Middle East. It features the latest award-winning simulators, video games and amusement rides for children.

- VOX Cinemas

Renaissance Cinema at City Centre Alexandria is a seven-screen cinema multiplex with state-of-the-art digital and 3D projection systems.

== Events ==
City Centre Alexandria has an active community engagement program. The mall regularly invites a number of charitable and social organizations into the mall to raise money or awareness for a variety of causes. Such organizations include American Heart Association and Technokids Egypt.
