= Mall of the Emirates =

Shopping mall in Dubai

- مول الإمارات (Arabic) mawl al-Imārāt

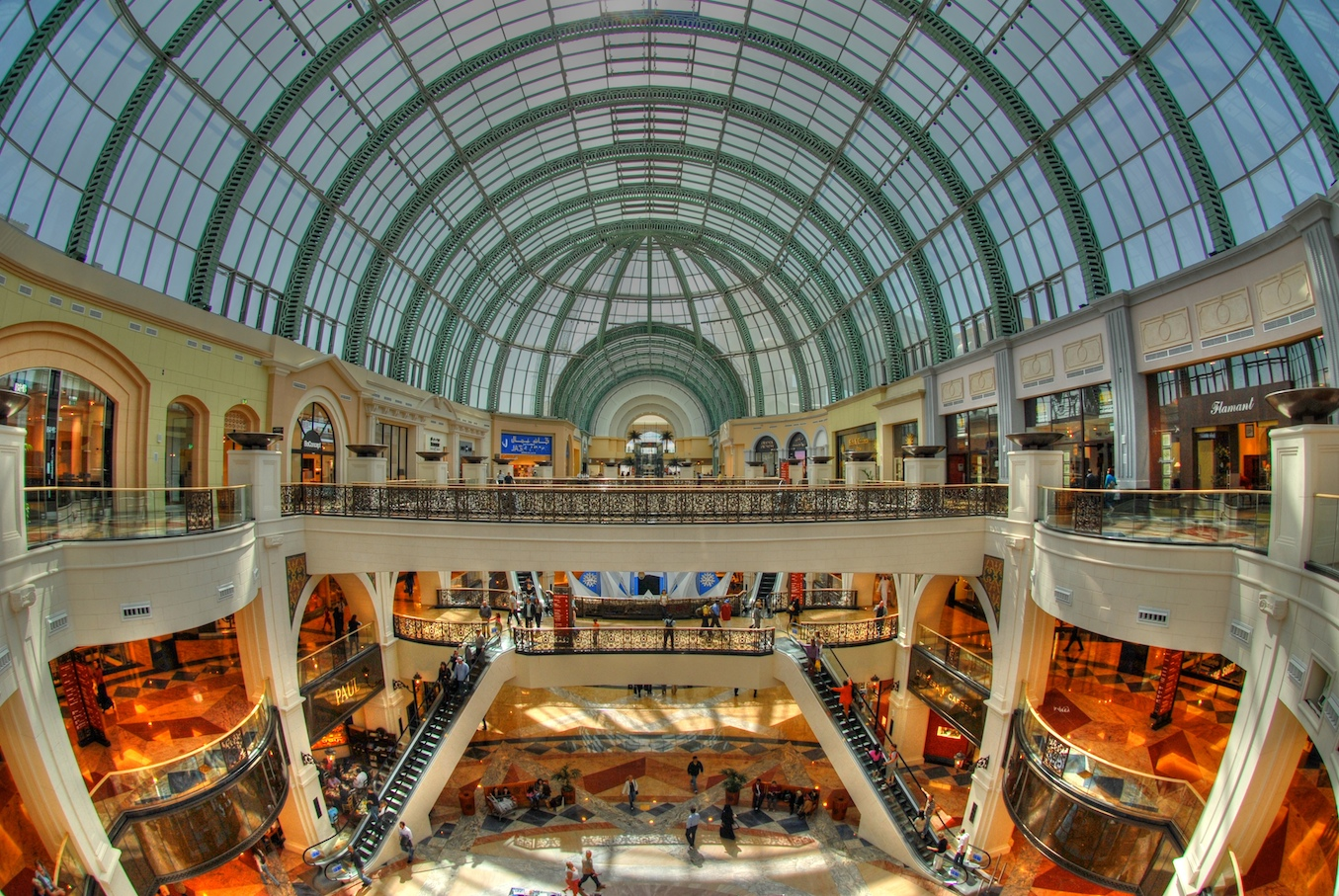
- Main entrance foyer of the mall
- Location: Dubai, United Arab Emirates
- Coordinates: 25°7′5″N 55°12′2″E
- Opened: 28 September 2005; 21 years ago
- Developer: Majid Al Futtaim Group
- Owner: Majid Al Futtaim Group
- Num. of stores: 900+
- Num. of anchor tenants: 11
- Floor area: 2,400,000 square feet (220,000 m^{2})
- Floors: 4
- Parking: 7000+
- Public transit: Mall of the Emirates Metro Station Red Line Bus routes: 84, 93, F29, F30, F33
- Website: www.malloftheemirates.com

Mall of the Emirates (Arabic: مول الإمارات) is a shopping mall in Dubai. Developed and owned by Majid Al Futtaim Group, it opened in November 2005 and is located at interchange four on Sheikh Zayed Road.

The multi-level shopping mall currently features more than 630 retail outlets, 7900 parking spaces, over 100 restaurants and cafés, 80 luxury stores and 250 flagship stores. It has a total gross leasable area of 255,489 square meters. It also hosts family leisure activities including Ski Dubai (the Middle East's first indoor ski resort and snow park), the 500-seat capacity Dubai Community Theatre and Arts Centre and Magic planet, one of the largest indoor family entertainment centers in Dubai.

In November 2005, it was named the World's Leading New Shopping Mall at the World Travel Awards in London. In 2017, Forbes named Mall of the Emirates as one of the top five shopping malls in Dubai.

== Construction and history ==
The project was launched in October 2003 at an estimated cost of AED 800 million (US$218 million), and was scheduled to be completed in September 2005. The architecture in the three-storey complex combines Arabic and Mediterranean elements, with each level connected to a car park.

The mall was designed by the American architectural firm F+A Architects. The main building contract was handled by Khansaheb, while the Ski Dubai contract was given to Pomagalski. The chair lifts in the snow park and the structural steel works were handled by Emirates Building System and the piling by Bauer.

The mall opened for business on 28 September 2005 with an official inauguration in November.

== Milestones ==
- September 2005 – Mall of the Emirates opens
- November 2005 – Opening of Ski Dubai, the Middle East's first indoor ski resort and snow park
- April 2006 – Kempinski opens hotel at the mall
- September 2008 – mall announces expansion to increase facilities for shopping, dining and parking
- September 2009 – completion of metro link to mall from the Red Line of the Dubai Metro
- August 2010 – launch of Fashion Dome
- 2012 – ranked the 7th most productive shopping center in the world, earning US$1,423 per square foot per annum, according to research by the International Council of Shopping Centres (ICSC)
- June 2013 – Mall of the Emirates announces Evolution 2015, a multi-stage AED 1 billion redevelopment project
- May 2014 – Mall of the Emirates changes their logo
- September 2015 – Mall of the Emirates opened the new expansion on Level 2.

== Shopping ==
Shops at the mall include a Carrefour hypermarket, Centrepoint, Primark, Harvey Nichols, Home Centre, Jashanmal and Marks & Spencer.

== Entertainment ==
The mall also hosts a number of family leisure offerings. These include the Magic Planet family entertainment area, a 20-screen VOX Cinema, Ski Dubai, and the Dubai Community Theatre and Arts Centre.

== Ski Dubai ==
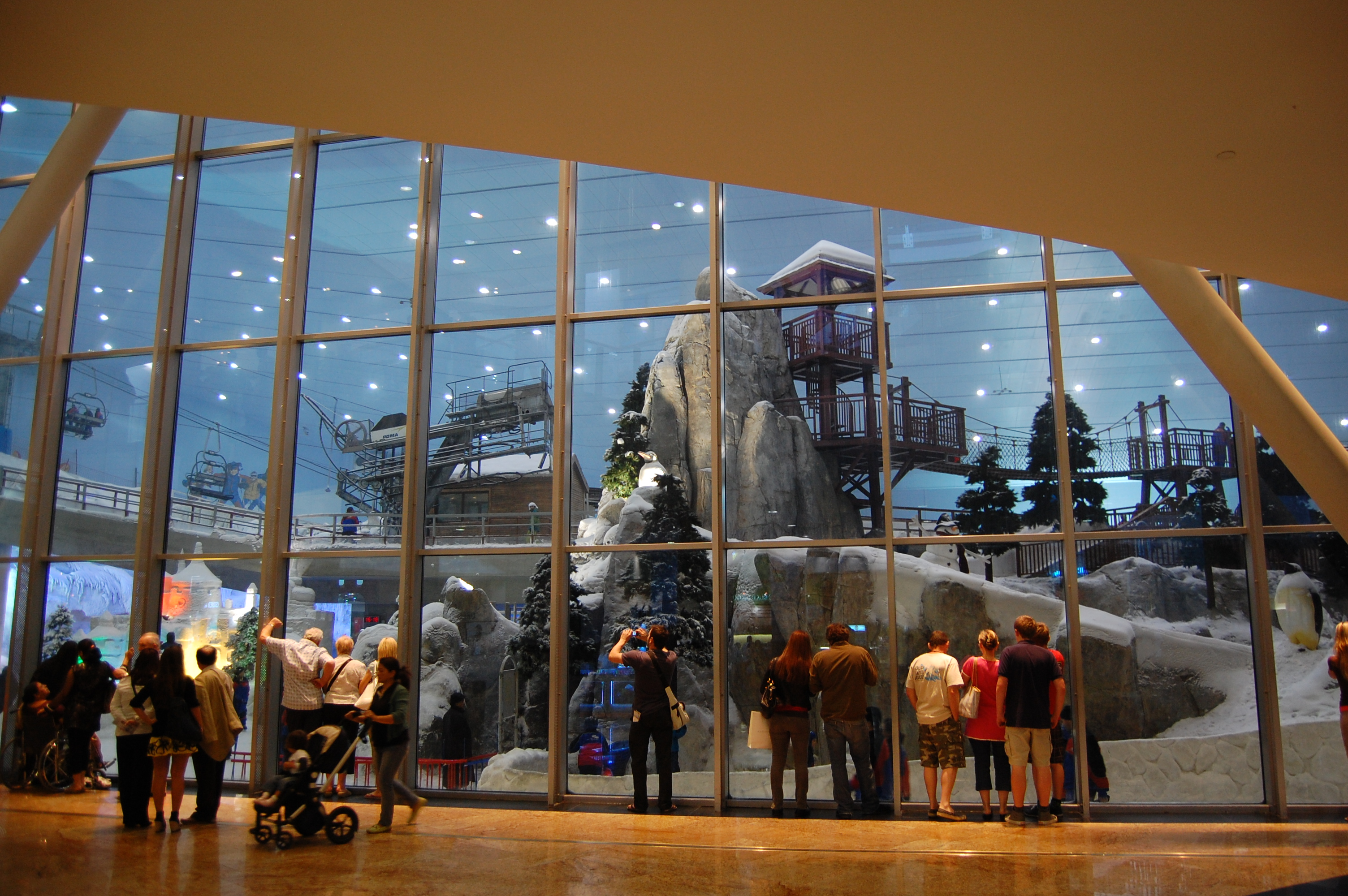
Spectators in the mall look into the Ski Dubai.

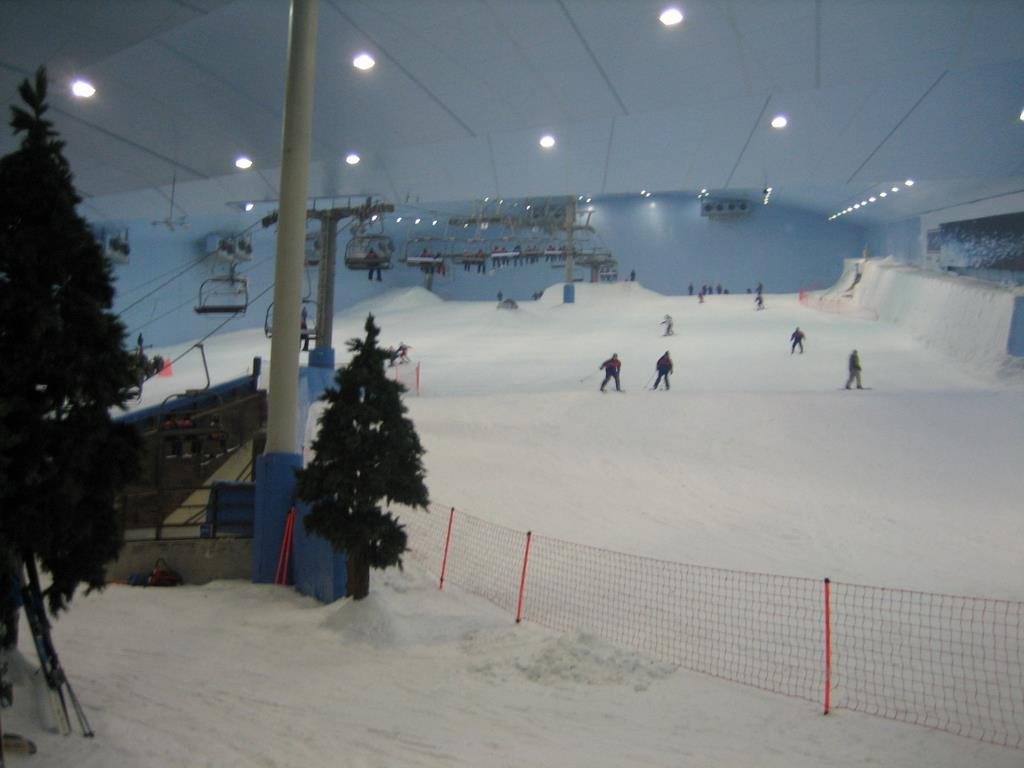
Ski Dubai ski slope.

Ski Dubai is a large indoor skiing facility at Mall of the Emirates, offering snowboarding, ski lessons, children's play area and cafe. It opened in November 2005 and houses the world's largest indoor snow park. It is operated by Majid Al Futtaim Leisure & Entertainment.

== Dubai Community Theatre and Arts Centre ==
Dubai Community Theatre and Arts Centre (DUCTAC) is a non-profit, cross-community creative centre that opened in November 2006, under the patronage of Princess Haya bint Hussein. It was spread over 7,424 square metres (79,910 sq ft) on the second floor of the Mall of the Emirates. There were two-level theatre and rehearsal spaces, along with an arts centre housing galleries, classrooms, studios, music school, library and high specification visual arts gallery.

In July 2018, Dubai Community Theatre & Arts Centre (DUCTAC) closed at the Mall of the Emirates.

== VOX Cinemas ==
VOX Cinemas has a 14-screen multiplex cinema at Mall of the Emirates, including 2 VOX Gold screens. VOX Cinemas is owned and operated by Majid Al Futtaim Cinemas. It is located in the new expansion area at Mall of the Emirates level 2 and consists of 24- screens including an IMAX with Laser theatre, Vox Kids, 4DX Cinema and Theatre by Rhodes.

== Magic Planet ==
Magic Planet is an indoor family entertainment centre with two entertainment zones for children and young adults. It has a ten-pin bowling alley with 12 lanes, pool and billiard tables, 180 amusement machines, and other attractions including a carousel, racing simulators, Jumping Star, soft play and bumper cars. It also includes the RoboCoaster (a two-person thrill ride unique to the Middle East) and XD Dark Ride, a "7D" adventure with 3D movie graphics and 4D effects including motion, wind and light.

== Dining ==
The mall has over 100 restaurants and cafes including eight restaurants in the Fashion Dome:

- Two international food courts
- Restaurants including St. Maxim's, Salmontini, Karam Beirut and Apres and Sezzam on the first floor
- UAE's African-themed diner Tribes at the Fashion Dome
- Häagen-Dazs café
- 12 new dining options on Level 2 including Omina Baharat, 800 Degrees Neapolitana Pizzeria, Dean & Deluca, Eat Greek Kouzina, Din Tai Fung, Azkadenya, Texas De Brazil & Common Grounds.
- The Cheesecake Factory, American restaurant
- Al Halabi – Lebanese restaurant
- P.F Chang's – American Chinese restaurant
- Miu Shanghai Tea House and Restaurant offers nosh from Japan, China, Thailand and Indonesia.
- YO! Sushi – conveyor belt sushi
- Nazcaa

== Hotels ==
The mall is directly connected to two international chain hotels: the 375-key Kempinski Hotel Mall of the Emirates in the west, and the 481-key Sheraton Mall of the Emirates Hotel in the east. The Kempinski hotel tower opened in 2006, while the second opened in 2010 as Pullman Dubai Mall of the Emirates. For the second hotel tower, Majid Al Futtaim handed the management role from Accor to Starwood in 2013, rebranding it as Sheraton Mall of the Emirates Hotel.

== Expansion ==
Mall of the Emirates’ AED 1 billion multi-stage redevelopment project, Evolution 2015, was completed in September 2015. The new Fashion District featuring 30 contemporary brands marked the completion of Phase 1. Phase 2 has added a second taxi rank located next to Ski Dubai on level 4. Phase 3, unveiled a new retail extension on Level 2 – an additional 36,000sqm of retail space added to include 40 new retailers.

On 10 September 2013, Mall of the Emirates announced a multi-stage redevelopment project worth an estimated AED 1 billion (US$274 million), which is called as Evolution 2015. Phase one of the project which will increase 5,000 sqm area more is already completed but expected to open in mid-2015 includes new shopping, dining and entertainment concepts. However, due to the limitations of its location, the mall will be expanded upwards by constructing a second floor on top of the Carrefour area.

On 25 August 2014, Mall of the Emirates announced phase two of its strategic redevelopment project, Evolution 2015 which is now currently underway. In this stage, the mall will be expanded by gross leasable area of 26,000 square metres (280,000 sq ft). This project includes an additional of 1300 new spaces for car parking, 12 new restaurants, new prayer rooms for both, men and women and the relocation of the current VOX Cinemas which will now have 24 screens. As per senior asset director of Mall of the Emirates Mr Fuad Sharaf,“Retail stores and restaurants seeking to expand throughout the world are often choosing the UAE to open their first Middle East location, based on the growing demands for high-fashion and choice across shopping and dining sectors. Mall of the Emirates is boosting the UAE’s retail landscape by offering international brands with a platform for growth.”

The new expansion project "Evolution 2015" was officially opened on 28 September 2015 which increased the gross leasable area to 26,000 square metres (280,000 sq ft). On 30 September 2015, David Beckham visited the mall for the inauguration of the Adidas store which was built in the newly expanded section.

== Gallery ==
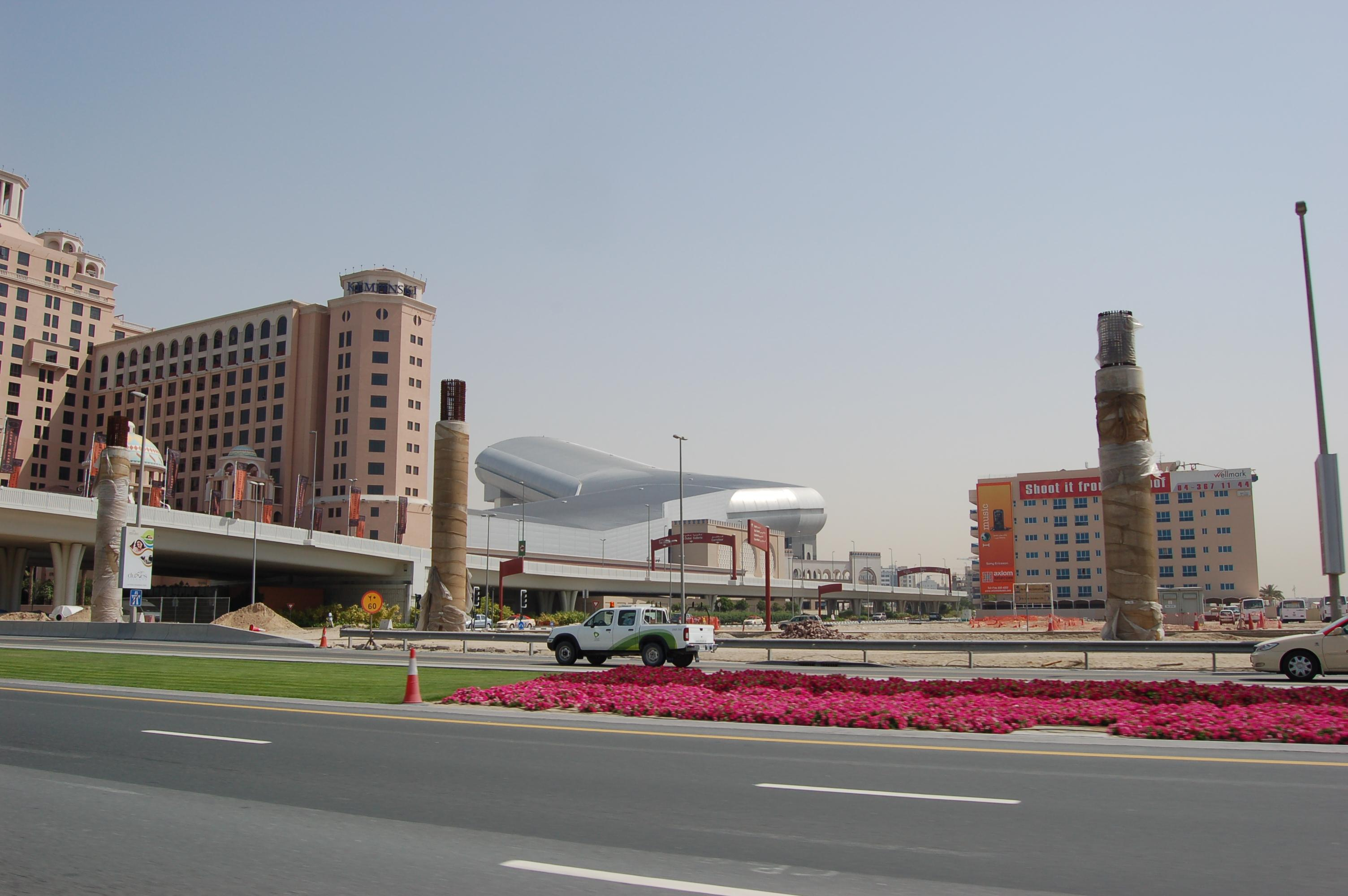
Ski Dubai seen from the Sheikh Zayed Road

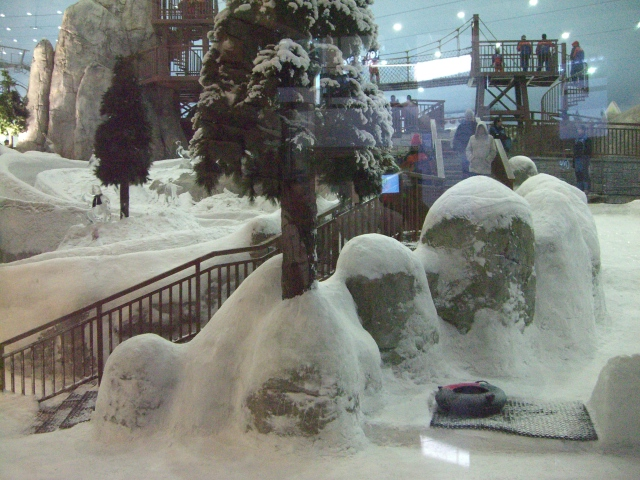
Looking into Ski Dubai from inside the mall
