= Majid Al Futtaim =

Emirati businessman (1934–2021)

- ماجد الفطيم
- Born: Majid Al Futtaim; 1934
- Died: 17 December 2021 (aged 86–87)
- Occupations: Founder and owner, Majid Al Futtaim Group
- Children: Tariq Al Futtaim
- Relatives: Abdulla Al Futtaim (cousin)
- Website: www.majidalfuttaim.com/en

Majid Al Futtaim (1934 – 17 December 2021) was an Emirati billionaire businessman, and the founder and owner of the Majid Al Futtaim Group, an Emirati real estate and retail conglomerate, with projects in Asia and Africa.

== Early life ==
Majid Al Futtaim was the cousin of fellow billionaire Abdulla Al Futtaim, the head of the Al-Futtaim Group, from whom he later became estranged.

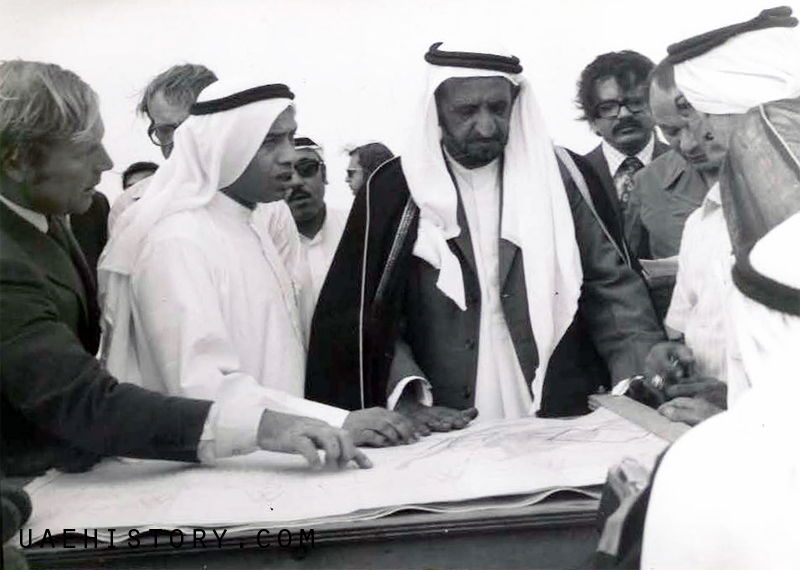
Majid Al Futtaim with Sheikh Rashid bin Saeed

The Majid Al-Futtaim Group currently spans 20 international markets and employs over 45,000 people.

== Career ==
He was the founder and owner of the Majid Al Futtaim Group, which he began in 1992 after splitting the Al Futtaim empire with his cousin.

According to Forbes, Al Futtaim's net worth was US$4 billion, in September 2021.

=== Notable buildings ===
His company's most notable properties include the Mall of the Emirates, complete with an indoor ski slope, and the Mall of Egypt that opened in March 2017.

== Personal life and death ==
Al Futtaim owned the yacht Quattroelle, built by Lürssen in 2013 for Michael Lee-Chin, who sold it in 2014. It has a crew of 29.

He was married and lived in Dubai. Al Futtaim died in Dubai on 17 December 2021. His son Tariq Al Futtaim is on the board of the Majid Al Futtaim Group.
