= Results of the 1970 Swedish general election =

Sweden held a general election on the 20 September 1970. This was the final general election being held before the municipal reform that cut the number of municipalities to below 290. This was the first unicameral Riksdag elected.

== National results ==
Party	Votes	%	Seats			
Party	Votes	%	Con.	Lev.	Tot.	+/–
Swedish Social Democratic Party	2,256,369	45.34	149	14	163	+38
Centre Party	991,208	19.92	67	4	71	+32
People's Party	806,667	16.21	51	7	58	+24
Moderate Party	573,812	11.53	36	5	41	+9
Left Party Communists	236,659	4.76	7	10	17	+14
Christian Democratic Unity	88,770	1.78	0	0	0	0
Communist League Marxist–Leninist	21,238	0.43	0	0	0	New
Other parties	1,473	0.03	0	0	0	0
Total	4,976,196	100.00	310	40	350	+117
Valid votes	4,976,196	99.84				
Invalid/blank votes	8,011	0.16				
Total votes	4,984,207	100.00				
Registered voters/turnout	5,645,804	88.28				
Source: Nohlen & Stöver

== Results by greater region ==
=== Percentage share ===
Location	Turnout	Share	Votes	S	C	FP	M	VPK	KDS	Other	Left	Right
Götaland	88.8	48.1	2,392,682	42.7	21.8	17.2	12.6	3.5	1.9	0.3	46.2	51.6
Svealand	88.0	37.1	1,845,788	46.7	17.0	16.8	12.0	5.3	1.4	0.6	52.1	45.9
Norrland	87.4	14.8	737,726	50.6	21.1	11.3	6.9	7.3	2.3	0.4	57.9	39.3
Total	88.3	100.0	4,976,196	45.3	19.9	16.2	11.5	4.8	1.8	0.5	50.0	47.6
Source: SCB

=== By votes ===
Location	Turnout	Share	Votes	S	C	FP	M	VPK	KDS	Other	Left	Right
Götaland	88.8	48.1	2,392,682	1,020,586	521,835	412,177	300,754	84,213	45,236	7,881	1,104,799	1,234,766
Svealand	88.0	37.1	1,845,788	862,463	313,673	310,853	222,388	98,586	26,263	11,562	961,049	846,914
Norrland	87.4	14.8	737,726	373,320	155,700	83,637	50,670	53,860	17,271	3,268	427,180	290,007
Total	88.3	100.0	4,976,196	2,256,369	991,208	806,667	573,812	236,659	88,770	22,711	2,493,028	2,371,687
Source: SCB

== Constituency results ==
=== Percentage share ===
Location	Land	Turnout	Share	Votes	S	C	FP	M	VPK	KDS	Other	Left	Right	Margin
Location		%	%		%	%	%	%	%	%	%	%	%	
Blekinge	G	85.4	1.9	95,576	50.2	18.7	15.2	9.9	4.2	1.6	0.1	54.4	43.9	10,068
Bohuslän	G	88.0	3.1	155,653	37.3	18.8	26.4	12.2	3.8	1.3	0.2	41.1	57.4	25,380
Gothenburg	G	86.4	5.5	273,369	37.9	9.3	31.9	10.5	8.3	1.0	1.1	46.2	51.8	15,296
Gotland	G	87.6	0.7	33,251	38.4	34.3	13.3	11.7	1.0	0.9	0.4	39.4	59.3	6,619
Gävleborg	N	86.6	3.7	183,731	52.0	21.7	10.7	5.7	8.0	1.4	0.4	60.1	38.1	40,410
Halland	G	89.9	2.4	119,972	37.7	33.5	13.1	11.8	2.4	1.8	0.6	40.0	58.4	22,042
Jämtland	N	86.8	1.6	80,319	49.7	24.6	11.5	8.8	3.2	1.7	0.5	53.0	44.8	6,571
Jönköping	G	90.6	3.9	192,625	38.9	25.4	15.6	12.4	2.8	4.7	0.1	41.7	53.5	22,815
Kalmar	G	88.6	3.1	153,510	45.0	25.4	9.6	13.4	3.5	2.7	0.3	48.6	48.4	185
Kopparberg	S	87.2	3.5	173,240	49.0	26.7	10.8	6.6	4.9	1.8	0.2	53.8	44.1	16,819
Kristianstad	G	88.1	3.3	166,509	42.7	25.4	14.6	13.2	1.8	2.3	0.1	44.5	53.2	14,414
Kronoberg	G	88.4	2.1	103,021	39.1	30.0	11.5	13.2	4.0	2.1	0.1	43.1	54.7	11,892
Malmö area	G	89.1	5.8	287,147	50.3	12.8	17.1	15.5	3.1	0.8	0.3	53.4	45.5	22,596
Malmöhus	G	90.5	3.3	163,491	46.4	27.2	12.7	12.0	0.8	0.8	0.1	47.2	51.9	7,639
Norrbotten	N	86.4	3.0	150,316	51.7	15.8	8.4	7.5	13.7	2.3	0.6	65.4	31.7	50,770
Skaraborg	G	88.4	3.2	160,647	35.9	29.8	15.5	12.9	2.8	2.8	0.2	38.7	58.3	31,487
Stockholm	S	86.4	9.9	490,884	42.6	10.0	21.0	16.7	7.4	1.2	1.1	49.9	47.8	10,546
Stockholm County	S	89.2	7.9	394,126	42.2	15.8	19.7	15.2	5.3	1.1	0.7	47.6	50.7	11,996
Södermanland	S	89.9	3.0	149,881	53.1	17.8	14.8	9.1	3.2	1.8	0.2	56.3	41.8	21,779
Uppsala	S	87.7	2.6	131,282	45.8	22.5	14.7	10.8	3.2	1.8	0.7	49.4	47.9	1,968
Värmland	S	88.9	3.7	183,757	51.1	20.1	14.3	7.6	4.3	2.2	0.3	55.9	42.7	24,133
Västerbotten	N	87.9	2.9	145,741	46.1	21.6	17.4	7.8	2.9	3.7	0.5	49.0	46.8	3,139
Västernorrland	N	89.1	3.6	177,619	52.2	23.0	9.5	5.9	6.6	2.5	0.3	58.8	38.4	36,283
Västmanland	S	87.9	3.0	148,587	53.5	17.8	14.8	7.3	4.8	1.4	0.4	58.3	39.9	27,340
Älvsborg N	G	88.4	2.7	136,078	41.3	24.8	18.8	9.8	3.0	2.1	0.1	44.3	53.5	12,444
Älvsborg S	G	91.1	2.2	111,877	39.9	24.2	13.7	17.8	2.9	1.2	0.3	42.8	55.7	14,441
Örebro	S	88.4	3.5	174,031	51.1	20.1	14.3	7.6	4.3	2.2	0.4	55.5	41.9	23,546
Östergötland	G	89.1	4.8	239,956	49.5	19.4	13.5	11.2	3.6	2.5	0.3	53.1	44.1	21,653
Total		88.3	100.0	4,976,196	45.3	19.9	16.2	11.5	4.8	1.8	0.5	50.0	47.6	121,341
Source: SCB

=== By votes ===
Location	Land	Turnout	Share	Votes	S	C	FP	M	VPK	KDS	Other	Left	Right	Margin
Location		%	%											
Blekinge	G	85.4	1.9	95,576	48,021	17,908	14,550	9,458	3,963	1,545	131	51,984	41,916	10,068
Bohuslän	G	88.0	3.1	155,653	57,967	29,294	41,069	18,964	5,980	2,003	376	63,947	89,327	25,380
Gothenburg	G	86.4	5.5	273,369	103,595	25,356	87,304	28,826	22,595	2,681	3,012	126,190	141,486	15,296
Gotland	G	87.6	0.7	33,251	12,766	11,391	4,430	3,900	336	305	123	13,102	19,721	6,619
Gävleborg	N	86.6	3.7	183,731	95,603	39,843	19,680	10,444	14,774	2,568	819	110,377	69,967	40,410
Halland	G	89.9	2.4	119,972	45,193	40,237	15,667	14,169	2,838	1,177	691	48,031	70,073	22,042
Jämtland	N	86.8	1.6	80,319	39,995	19,749	9,199	7,059	2,583	1,363	371	42,578	36,007	6,571
Jönköping	G	90.6	3.9	192,625	74,904	48,998	30,117	23,960	5,356	9,025	265	80,260	103,075	22,815
Kalmar	G	88.6	3.1	153,510	69,136	39,027	14,711	20,636	5,423	4,189	388	74,559	74,374	185
Kopparberg	S	87.2	3.5	173,240	84,858	46,290	18,706	11,457	8,414	3,136	379	93,272	76,453	16,819
Kristianstad	G	88.1	3.3	166,509	71,081	42,345	24,261	21,931	3,042	3,749	100	74,123	88,537	14,414
Kronoberg	G	88.4	2.1	103,021	40,323	30,915	11,813	13,598	4,111	2,120	141	44,434	56,326	11,892
Malmö area	G	89.1	5.8	287,147	144,317	36,744	49,218	44,650	8,891	2,372	955	153,208	130,612	22,596
Malmöhus	G	90.5	3.3	163,491	75,912	44,395	20,823	19,586	1,253	1,376	146	77,165	84,804	7,639
Norrbotten	N	86.4	3.0	150,316	77,755	23,677	12,587	11,323	20,602	3,420	952	98,357	47,587	50,770
Skaraborg	G	88.4	3.2	160,647	57,686	47,942	24,964	20,775	4,508	4,513	259	62,194	93,681	31,487
Stockholm	S	86.4	9.9	490,884	208,967	49,183	103,170	82,152	36,084	5,869	5,459	245,051	234,505	10,546
Stockholm County	S	89.2	7.9	394,126	166,549	62,122	77,737	59,768	21,082	4,141	2,727	187,631	199,627	11,996
Södermanland	S	89.9	3.0	149,881	79,586	26,749	22,140	13,709	4,791	2,650	256	84,377	62,598	21,779
Uppsala	S	87.7	2.6	131,282	60,182	29,501	19,319	14,120	4,726	2,554	880	64,908	62,940	1,968
Värmland	S	88.9	3.7	183,757	93,739	38,436	22,847	17,243	8,920	2,099	473	102,659	78,526	24,133
Västerbotten	N	87.9	2.9	145,741	67,177	31,509	25,325	11,412	4,208	5,434	676	71,385	68,246	3,139
Västernorrland	N	89.1	3.6	177,619	92,790	40,922	16,846	10,432	11,693	4,486	450	104,483	68,200	36,283
Västmanland	S	87.9	3.0	148,587	79,523	26,440	22,044	10,796	7,097	2,062	625	86,620	59,280	27,340
Älvsborg N	G	88.4	2.7	136,078	56,206	33,736	25,648	13,361	4,095	2,881	151	60,301	72,745	12,444
Älvsborg S	G	91.1	2.2	111,877	44,649	27,070	15,283	19,952	3,215	1,376	332	47,864	62,305	14,441
Örebro	S	88.4	3.5	174,031	89,059	34,952	24,890	13,143	7,472	3,752	763	96,531	72,985	23,546
Östergötland	G	89.1	4.8	239,956	118,830	46,477	32,319	26,988	8,607	5,924	811	127,437	105,784	21,653
Total		88.3	100.0	4,976,196	2,256,369	991,208	806,667	573,812	236,659	88,770	22,711	2,493,028	2,371,687	121,341
Source: SCB

== 1968–1970 bloc comparison ==
=== Percentage share ===
Constituency	Land	Votes 1968	Left 1968	Right 1968	Win 1968	Votes 1970	Left 1970	Right 1970	Win 1970	Change
Constituency			%	%	%		%	%	%	%
Blekinge	G	92,666	56.87	41.70	15.17	95,576	54.39	43.86	10.53	4.64
Bohuslän	G	141,544	45.48	53.39	7.91	155,653	41.08	57.39	16.31	8.40
Gothenburg	G	270,614	51.86	47.39	4.47	273,369	46.16	51.76	5.60	10.07
Gotland	G	32,662	40.25	59.17	18.92	33,251	39.40	59.31	19.91	0.99
Gävleborg	N	181,251	62.40	36.47	25.93	183,731	60.08	38.08	22.00	3.93
Halland	G	115,797	42.40	56.33	13.93	119,972	40.04	58.41	18.37	4.44
Jämtland	N	80,036	55.62	42.84	12.78	80,319	53.01	44.83	8.18	4.60
Jönköping	G	186,184	44.35	51.75	7.40	192,625	41.67	53.51	11.84	4.44
Kalmar	G	148,058	50.58	47.65	2.93	153,510	48.57	48.45	0.12	2.81
Kopparberg	S	170,382	56.42	41.94	14.48	173,240	53.84	44.13	9.71	4.77
Kristianstad	G	164,954	46.83	51.72	4.89	166,509	44.52	53.17	8.65	3.76
Kronoberg	G	102,843	45.72	52.89	7.17	103,021	43.13	54.67	11.54	4.37
Malmö area	G	263,678	58.07	41.15	16.92	287,147	53.36	45.49	7.87	9.05
Malmöhus	G	167,646	50.40	49.01	1.39	163,491	47.20	51.87	4.67	6.06
Norrbotten	N	147,532	68.58	29.43	39.15	150,316	65.43	31.66	33.77	5.38
Skaraborg	G	157,577	41.01	56.89	15.88	160,647	38.71	58.31	19.60	3.72
Stockholm	S	492,100	52.74	46.04	6.70	490,884	49.92	47.77	2.15	4.55
Stockholm County	S	362,977	50.53	48.42	2.11	394,126	47.61	50.65	3.04	5.15
Södermanland	S	147,344	58.45	40.05	18.40	149,881	56.30	41.77	14.53	3.87
Uppsala	S	116,607	52.70	45.38	7.32	131,282	49.44	47.94	1.50	5.82
Värmland	S	182,064	58.59	40.50	18.09	183,757	55.87	42.73	13.14	4.95
Västerbotten	N	142,696	50.84	45.93	4.91	145,741	48.98	46.83	2.15	2.76
Västernorrland	N	175,807	61.35	36.28	25.07	177,619	58.82	38.40	20.42	4.65
Västmanland	S	145,522	61.03	37.69	23.34	148,587	58.30	39.90	18.40	4.94
Älvsborg N	G	128,385	47.31	50.83	3.52	136,078	44.31	53.46	9.15	5.63
Älvsborg S	G	111,621	45.33	53.80	8.47	111,877	42.78	55.69	12.91	4.44
Örebro	S	169,382	58.44	39.65	18.79	174,031	55.47	41.94	13.53	5.26
Östergötland	G	231,450	56.23	41.60	14.63	239,956	53.11	44.08	9.03	5.60
Total		4,829,379	53.12	45.35	7.77	4,976,196	50.10	47,66	2.44	5.33
Source: SCB

=== By votes ===
Constituency	Land	Votes 1968	Left 1968	Right 1968	Win 1968	Votes 1970	Left 1970	Right 1970	Win 1970	Change
Constituency	#									
Blekinge	G	92,666	52,700	38,641	14,059	95,576	51,984	41,916	10,068	3,991
Bohuslän	G	141,544	64,377	75,567	11,190	155,653	63,947	89,327	25,380	14,190
Gothenburg	G	270,614	140,332	128,247	12,085	273,369	126,190	141,486	15,296	27,381
Gotland	G	32,662	13,145	19,326	6,181	33,251	13,102	19,721	6,619	438
Gävleborg	N	181,251	113,098	66,099	46,999	183,731	110,377	69,967	40,410	6,589
Halland	G	115,797	49,103	65,223	16,120	119,972	48,031	70,073	22,042	5,922
Jämtland	N	80,036	44,516	34,285	10,231	80,319	42,578	36,007	6,571	3,660
Jönköping	G	186,184	82,567	96,347	13,780	192,625	80,260	103,075	22,815	9,035
Kalmar	G	148,058	74,886	70,555	4,331	153,510	74,559	74,374	185	4,146
Kopparberg	S	170,382	96,131	71,457	24,674	173,240	93,272	76,453	16,819	7,855
Kristianstad	G	164,954	77,254	85,322	8,068	166,509	74,123	88,537	14,414	6,346
Kronoberg	G	102,843	47,024	54,389	7,365	103,021	44,434	56,326	11,892	4,527
Malmö area	G	263,678	153,111	108,501	44,610	287,147	153,208	130,612	22,596	22,014
Malmöhus	G	167,646	84,497	82,167	2,330	163,491	77,165	84,804	7,639	9,969
Norrbotten	N	147,532	101,181	43,425	57,756	150,316	98,357	47,587	50,770	6,986
Skaraborg	G	157,577	64,619	89,648	25,029	160,647	62,194	93,681	31,487	6,458
Stockholm	S	492,100	259,538	226,558	32,980	490,884	245,051	234,505	10,546	22,434
Stockholm County	S	362,977	183,421	175,743	7,678	394,126	187,631	199,627	11,996	19,674
Södermanland	S	147,344	86,127	59,006	27,121	149,881	84,377	62,598	21,779	5,342
Uppsala	S	116,607	61,457	52,920	8,537	131,282	64,908	62,940	1,968	6,569
Värmland	S	182,064	106,664	73,743	32,921	183,757	102,659	78,526	24,133	8,788
Västerbotten	N	142,696	72,548	65,538	7,010	145,741	71,385	68,246	3,139	3,871
Västernorrland	N	175,807	107,864	63,774	44,090	177,619	104,483	68,200	36,283	7,807
Västmanland	S	145,522	88,815	54,841	33,974	148,587	86,620	59,280	27,340	6,634
Älvsborg N	G	128,385	60,734	65,264	4,530	136,078	60,301	72,745	12,444	7,914
Älvsborg S	G	111,621	50,603	60,057	9,454	111,877	47,864	62,305	14,441	4,987
Örebro	S	169,382	98,987	67,154	31,833	174,031	96,531	72,985	23,546	8,287
Östergötland	G	231,450	130,150	96,294	33,856	239,956	127,437	105,784	21,653	12,203
Total		4,829,379	2,565,449	2,190,091	375,358	4,976,196	2,493,028	2,371,687	121,341	254,017
Source: SCB

== Results by municipality ==
1970 was the final election where the postal votes were counted separately from the polling station votes in one unified count across municipalities. The exception to these results are those where the whole constituency was one municipality - namely Gothenburg, Gotland and Stockholm where all postal votes were automatically denoted as part of said municipalities.

=== Blekinge ===
Location	Turnout	Share	Votes	S	C	FP	M	VPK	KDS	Other	L-vote	R-vote	Left	Right	Margin
Location	%	%		%	%	%	%	%	%	%			%	%	
Fridlevstad	86.8	3.1	2,931	40.0	37.8	7.3	10.5	2.5	2.0	0.0	1,243	1,630	42.4	55.6	387
Hasslö	86.9	0.9	861	63.9	13.7	5.6	1.0	9.3	6.5	0.0	630	175	73.2	20.3	455
Jämjö	89.9	5.8	5,557	45.9	27.8	12.3	10.8	1.2	1.9	0.1	2,617	2,831	47.1	50.9	214
Karlshamn	87.9	18.1	17,311	55.0	17.8	11.0	8.2	6.2	1.4	0.3	10,603	6,412	61.3	37.0	4,191
Karlskrona	87.0	19.6	18,765	53.2	11.8	20.9	8.4	4.1	1.5	0.1	10,753	7,709	57.3	41.1	3,044
Nättraby	91.7	2.0	1,871	52.3	19.3	15.0	8.8	4.1	0.5	0.0	1,055	807	56.4	43.1	248
Olofström	89.0	8.4	7,998	53.4	19.4	11.2	7.9	5.5	2.6	0.1	4,710	3,073	58.9	38.4	1,637
Ronneby	89.2	17.3	16,520	52.7	24.0	11.0	7.6	3.9	0.7	0.1	9,361	7,028	56.7	42.5	2,333
Rödeby	90.7	2.4	2,335	46.9	26.8	14.4	8.7	1.5	1.5	0.0	1,129	1,163	48.4	49.8	34
Sölvesborg	89.2	8.9	8,552	50.3	17.9	14.2	12.3	3.5	1.7	0.1	4,600	3,798	53.8	44.4	802
Postal vote		13.5	12,875	37.9	14.0	25.3	17.3	3.1	2.1	0.3	5,283	7,290	41.0	56.6	2,007
Total	85.4	1.9	95,576	50.2	18.7	15.2	9.9	4.2	1.6	0.1	51,984	41,916	54.4	43.9	10,068
Source:SCB

=== Dalarna ===
Dalarna County was known as Kopparberg County at the time, but shared the same borders as in the 21st century.

Kopparberg County
There was a discrepancy of three votes between the Kopparberg County's official count (173,240 votes) and the municipality and post ballot-based list (173,243 votes). This difference accounted for 0.00173% of the overall vote and thus did not change any percentages.

Location	Turnout	Share	Votes	S	C	FP	M	VPK	KDS	Other	L-vote	R-vote	Left	Right	Margin
Location	%	%		%	%	%	%	%	%	%			%	%	
Avesta	89.1	8.5	14,798	57.1	23.3	7.6	3.7	6.0	1.9	0.4	9,338	5,123	63.1	34.6	4,215
Borlänge	88.9	13.2	22,842	56.1	24.3	8.5	4.6	4.7	1.7	0.1	13,892	8,545	60.8	37.4	5,347
Falun	85.8	14.2	24,621	43.0	26.9	15.5	8.8	3.9	1.6	0.3	11,553	12,589	46.9	51.1	1,036
Gagnef	89.7	2.8	4,889	45.6	38.8	6.9	3.6	2.9	2.2	0.0	2,370	2,408	48.5	49.3	38
Hedemora	87.2	5.4	9,412	51.9	28.4	7.8	6.1	3.6	2.1	0.1	5,218	3,991	55.4	42.4	1,227
Leksand	86.9	2.8	4,917	40.1	34.5	14.4	7.3	1.7	1.9	0.1	2,058	2,761	41.9	56.2	703
Ludvika	87.1	10.5	18,232	60.4	16.1	8.3	4.3	9.5	1.0	0.2	12,753	5,259	69.9	28.8	7,494
Malung	90.0	4.2	7,323	51.4	27.1	11.6	6.0	2.7	1.0	0.1	3,966	3,278	54.2	44.8	688
Mora	85.4	5.6	9,760	39.4	37.9	9.7	7.6	4.1	1.1	0.1	4,258	5,391	43.6	55.2	1,133
Ore	82.9	0.7	1,161	44.8	28.6	9.6	2.3	12.7	1.7	0.3	667	470	57.5	40.5	197
Orsa	84.7	2.3	3,981	41.3	35.9	8.4	5.8	7.2	1.3	0.1	1,929	1,997	48.5	50.2	68
Rättvik	80.2	2.8	4,891	38.1	36.6	12.4	8.0	2.8	2.1	0.0	2,004	2,785	41.0	56.9	781
Siljansnäs	81.1	0.6	971	39.8	38.2	5.4	3.5	2.5	10.5	0.2	410	457	42.2	47.1	47
Smedjebacken	90.3	3.2	5,496	67.9	13.9	7.9	4.0	5.4	0.8	0.1	4,032	1,415	73.4	25.7	2,617
Säter	88.3	3.3	5,703	41.0	38.5	9.2	5.8	2.5	2.9	0.2	2,479	3,048	43.5	53.4	569
Söderbärke	88.9	0.9	1,603	53.8	32.4	5.8	3.4	3.4	1.1	0.0	918	667	57.3	41.6	251
Vansbro	86.6	3.1	5,456	43.8	33.3	7.9	4.7	6.7	3.2	0.3	2,759	2,504	50.6	45.9	255
Ål	90.8	0.9	1,497	40.6	32.8	18.0	4.6	2.1	1.9	0.0	640	829	42.8	55.4	189
Älvdalen	83.4	2.9	4,973	43.3	34.4	11.7	4.0	4.9	1.6	0.1	2,399	2,489	48.2	50.1	90
Postal vote		12.0	20,717	42.5	21.0	15.9	13.5	4.0	2.5	0.6	9,632	10,447	46.5	50.4	815
Total	87.2	3.5	173,240	49.0	26.7	10.8	6.6	4.9	1.8	0.2	93,272	76,453	53.8	44.1	16,819
Source:SCB

=== Gotland ===
Location	Turnout	Share	Votes	S	C	FP	M	VPK	KDS	Other	L-vote	R-vote	Left	Right	Margin
Location	%	%		%	%	%	%	%	%	%			%	%	
Gotland	87.6	100.0	33,251	38.4	34.3	13.3	11.7	1.0	0.9	0.4	13,102	19,721	39.4	59.3	6,619
Total	87.6	0.7	33,251	38.4	34.3	13.3	11.7	1.0	0.9	0.4	13,102	19,721	39.4	59.3	6,619
Source:SCB

=== Gävleborg ===
Location	Turnout	Share	Votes	S	C	FP	M	VPK	KDS	Other	L-vote	R-vote	Left	Right	Margin
Location	%	%		%	%	%	%	%	%	%			%	%	
Alfta	90.1	1.8	3,261	38.1	39.3	11.7	4.2	4.2	2.4	0.1	1,380	1,801	42.3	55.2	421
Arbrå	86.6	1.6	2,930	42.0	26.1	15.2	4.5	10.0	1.8	0.3	1,526	1,340	52.1	45.7	186
Bergsjö	85.4	1.0	1,759	34.2	42.8	7.5	3.0	9.9	2.4	0.2	776	936	44.1	53.2	160
Bollnäs	84.4	4.9	9,093	47.6	25.7	11.6	4.2	8.9	1.4	0.4	5,143	3,784	56.6	41.6	1,359
Gnarp	84.7	0.8	1,492	41.6	35.8	12.5	2.3	4.8	3.0	0.1	692	754	46.4	50.5	62
Gävle	85.7	24.1	44,281	56.9	15.6	13.8	5.8	6.0	1.4	0.6	27,836	15,556	62.9	35.1	12,280
Hanebo	90.2	1.4	2,503	48.7	32.2	6.7	2.3	8.9	0.8	0.4	1,442	1,032	57.6	41.2	410
Harmånger	89.2	1.5	2,728	44.0	36.7	6.0	3.0	7.4	2.8	0.1	1,401	1,248	51.4	45.7	153
Hassela	88.2	0.5	982	51.0	27.8	7.9	1.7	9.3	2.0	0.2	592	368	60.3	37.5	224
Hofors	87.4	4.6	8,443	59.4	14.3	6.9	4.2	14.3	0.8	0.2	6,220	2,142	73.7	25.4	4,078
Hudiksvall	84.9	10.8	19,844	43.6	33.6	6.9	4.4	9.9	1.4	0.1	10,625	8,911	53.5	44.9	1,714
Ljusdal	83.5	6.9	12,691	46.5	27.2	8.8	3.4	12.4	1.4	0.3	7,479	4,993	58.9	39.3	2,486
Ockelbo	85.7	2.2	4,126	54.9	28.6	7.3	4.4	3.7	0.9	0.2	2,420	1,661	58.7	40.3	759
Ovanåker	89.2	2.6	4,786	49.2	26.3	12.0	5.0	4.3	3.2	0.1	2,559	2,070	53.5	43.3	489
Rengsjö	88.7	0.5	877	37.3	37.1	5.2	3.5	15.5	0.7	0.7	463	402	52.8	45.8	61
Sandviken	88.7	13.2	24,278	59.3	18.0	8.8	4.7	7.7	1.0	0.5	16,243	7,666	66.9	31.6	8,577
Söderhamn	89.2	9.6	17,714	59.0	17.3	6.5	5.4	10.6	0.9	0.4	12,331	5,162	69.6	29.1	7,169
Postal vote		11.9	21,943	46.0	16.8	16.9	12.6	5.2	1.7	0.8	11,249	10,141	51.3	46.2	1,108
Total	86.6	3.7	183,731	52.0	21.7	10.7	5.7	8.0	1.4	0.4	110,377	69,967	60.1	38.1	40,410
Source:SCB

=== Halland ===
Location	Turnout	Share	Votes	S	C	FP	M	VPK	KDS	Other	L-vote	R-vote	Left	Right	Margin
Location	%	%		%	%	%	%	%	%	%			%	%	
Eldsberga	92.4	1.4	1,644	39.0	40.3	10.5	8.6	1.0	0.3	0.3	657	977	40.0	59.4	320
Enslöv	92.3	1.3	1,524	37.5	47.2	6.4	4.7	2.6	1.4	0.2	611	889	40.1	58.3	278
Falkenberg	91.5	15.6	18,756	35.4	44.2	8.3	9.8	1.4	0.7	0.1	6,913	11,697	36.9	62.4	4,784
Fjärås	91.0	1.9	2,247	27.2	54.8	7.5	9.1	0.8	0.6	0.0	629	1,605	28.0	71.4	976
Getinge	94.9	1.1	1,378	50.0	34.0	4.5	10.2	0.9	0.2	0.1	702	672	50.9	48.8	30
Halmstad	87.9	21.3	25,509	52.0	17.4	15.0	8.9	5.1	1.2	0.3	14,565	10,548	57.1	41.4	4,017
Harplinge	91.6	1.6	1,915	41.8	39.1	5.8	9.9	2.3	0.8	0.2	845	1,051	44.1	54.9	206
Hishult	86.9	0.7	892	17.2	57.7	8.3	12.4	1.9	2.5	0.0	170	700	19.1	78.5	530
Knäred	88.4	1.0	1,220	20.4	60.2	7.2	9.5	0.3	2.3	0.1	253	938	20.7	76.9	685
Kungsbacka	89.5	7.3	8,770	32.5	24.8	26.2	13.7	2.0	0.6	0.2	3,024	5,670	34.5	64.7	2,646
Kvibille	91.6	1.3	1,519	33.8	48.8	5.9	9.2	1.1	1.2	0.1	530	970	34.9	63.9	440
Laholm	89.5	4.7	5,631	32.2	47.6	9.5	9.1	0.8	0.6	0.1	1,862	3,728	33.1	66.2	1,866
Löftadalen	91.6	1.6	1,909	17.9	62.9	8.9	7.8	0.2	2.3	0.1	345	1,519	18.1	79.6	1,174
Onsala	90.4	1.2	1,388	29.5	26.5	25.1	16.1	2.4	0.4	0.0	444	939	32.0	67.7	495
Oskarström	91.6	1.5	1,752	67.2	12.4	9.5	5.0	4.7	1.1	0.1	1,259	471	71.9	26.9	788
Ränneslöv	91.0	1.5	1,746	22.1	65.0	3.0	9.0	0.3	0.5	0.1	391	1,344	22.4	77.0	953
Söndrum	94.7	2.8	3,335	43.4	17.2	16.8	19.3	2.5	0.7	0.1	1,532	1,777	45.9	53.3	245
Torup	91.4	2.0	2,452	40.4	39.0	8.8	10.3	0.5	0.8	0.1	1,004	1,426	40.9	58.2	422
Varberg	89.1	18.2	21,775	34.3	39.2	10.4	11.2	1.9	1.0	2.0	7,868	13,258	36.1	60.9	5,390
Veinge	90.9	1.5	1,789	31.9	53.3	5.3	7.8	1.3	0.4	0.1	593	1,187	33.1	66.3	594
Postal vote		10.7	12,821	28.1	22.5	21.1	24.3	1.8	1.4	0.8	3,834	8,707	29.9	67.9	4,873
Total	89.9	2.4	119,972	37.7	33.5	13.1	11.8	2.4	1.8	0.6	48,031	70,073	40.0	58.4	22,042
Source:SCB

=== Jämtland ===
Location	Turnout	Share	Votes	S	C	FP	M	VPK	KDS	Other	L-vote	R-vote	Left	Right	Margin
Location	%	%		%	%	%	%	%	%	%			%	%	
Alsen	85.5	1.0	812	45.3	27.2	9.5	11.1	4.1	2.3	0.5	401	388	49.4	47.8	13
Berg	83.8	6.8	5,497	40.0	36.3	9.4	9.1	3.0	1.8	0.4	2,362	3,012	43.0	54.8	650
Bräcke	89.8	2.1	1,681	63.8	19.0	5.7	6.5	4.5	0.4	0.1	1,147	525	68.2	31.2	622
Fors	86.5	1.5	1,224	58.3	24.6	6.9	5.4	4.2	0.6	0.1	765	451	62.5	36.8	314
Frostviken	85.7	1.2	979	70.1	17.0	5.8	3.2	2.2	1.1	0.6	708	254	72.3	25.9	454
Föllinge	85.6	2.1	1,705	44.0	28.8	12.4	7.4	2.0	5.3	0.2	784	828	46.0	48.6	44
Hallen	82.8	1.0	800	27.1	46.5	13.1	9.1	1.0	2.6	0.5	225	550	28.1	68.8	325
Hammerdal	90.5	2.9	2,305	48.8	31.3	9.3	6.3	1.9	2.0	0.3	1,169	1,082	50.7	46.9	87
Hede	81.1	1.9	1,503	56.4	25.0	8.9	2.7	6.0	0.8	0.2	938	550	62.4	36.6	388
Hogdal	81.3	1.5	1,175	58.4	19.8	5.6	6.0	8.3	0.9	1.0	784	369	66.7	31.4	415
Kall	81.6	0.7	557	46.9	32.9	10.4	7.2	1.8	0.9	0.0	271	281	48.7	50.4	10
Kälarne	91.1	2.1	1,668	59.5	22.1	5.2	6.8	5.5	0.8	0.2	1,083	568	64.9	34.1	515
Lillhärdal	82.2	0.8	666	67.1	13.4	11.4	1.7	4.4	1.8	0.3	476	176	71.5	26.4	300
Mörsil	89.3	1.4	1,158	49.5	24.0	14.0	7.7	3.6	0.9	0.3	615	529	53.1	45.7	86
Offerdal	84.7	2.1	1,705	39.3	36.4	11.3	9.3	0.6	2.9	0.2	680	971	39.9	57.0	291
Ragunda	89.8	2.7	2,171	57.6	26.3	5.0	5.8	3.2	1.9	0.2	1,320	805	60.8	37.1	515
Revsund	89.4	3.0	2,379	55.4	26.4	7.6	6.5	3.3	0.5	0.3	1,398	964	58.8	40.5	434
Rödön	86.4	4.1	3,253	49.1	27.4	9.8	8.1	3.9	1.4	0.3	1,726	1,473	53.1	45.3	253
Ström	89.0	4.9	3,911	63.1	18.7	8.6	5.4	2.6	1.0	0.7	2,568	1,278	65.7	32.7	1,290
Stugun	91.7	1.8	1,425	60.6	20.6	2.2	10.7	4.9	0.4	0.6	934	478	65.5	33.5	456
Sveg	83.7	3.3	2,645	60.8	18.2	7.5	4.2	7.1	1.7	0.5	1,796	791	67.9	29.9	1,005
Tännäs	82.7	1.2	973	55.2	21.2	12.2	8.3	2.5	0.5	0.1	561	406	57.7	41.7	155
Undersåker	88.9	1.8	1,458	51.7	24.0	11.6	8.8	2.1	1.7	0.1	784	648	53.7	44.4	136
Åre	87.2	1.6	1,254	45.7	18.5	22.3	8.3	2.2	2.6	0.4	601	616	47.9	49.1	15
Östersund	87.2	31.5	25,283	48.0	24.2	13.3	9.6	2.9	1.6	0.4	12,872	11,913	50.9	47.1	959
Postal vote		15.1	12,132	43.5	20.7	16.1	13.5	2.7	2.4	1.1	5,610	6,101	46.2	50.3	491
Total	86.8	1.6	80,319	49.7	24.6	11.5	8.8	3.2	1.7	0.5	42,578	36,007	53.0	44.8	6,571
Source:SCB

=== Jönköping ===
Location	Turnout	Share	Votes	S	C	FP	M	VPK	KDS	Other	L-vote	R-vote	Left	Right	Margin
Location	%	%		%	%	%	%	%	%	%			%	%	
Anderstorp	94.3	1.2	2,392	43.1	20.3	17.3	15.6	2.2	1.6	0.0	1,082	1,271	45.2	53.1	189
Aneby	89.9	1.9	3,736	26.9	33.6	18.7	12.9	0.9	6.9	0.1	1,039	2,435	27.8	65.2	1,396
Burseryd	92.3	0.9	1,733	21.6	45.6	13.1	16.8	0.9	1.9	0.0	391	1,309	22.6	75.5	918
Eksjö	89.5	5.2	9,950	37.6	30.5	15.0	11.2	1.5	4.0	0.1	3,895	5,646	39.1	56.7	1,751
Gislaved	92.5	2.3	4,410	57.6	19.3	10.2	7.5	3.3	2.1	0.1	2,682	1,632	60.8	37.0	1,050
Gnosjö	93.3	2.3	4,349	31.0	32.4	14.3	13.2	1.8	6.9	0.3	1,430	2,606	32.9	59.9	1,176
Hjälmseryd	90.0	1.3	2,434	16.8	47.0	13.6	15.0	0.7	6.9	0.0	425	1,840	17.5	75.6	1,415
Hylte	92.6	1.7	3,282	41.7	43.1	4.6	8.4	0.8	1.3	0.1	1,393	1,843	42.4	56.2	450
Jönköping	90.1	30.2	58,139	44.7	18.7	17.1	11.3	3.6	4.5	0.1	28,082	27,375	48.3	47.1	707
Nässjö	91.1	10.0	19,260	43.2	25.7	14.5	10.0	3.2	3.1	0.2	8,938	9,676	46.4	50.2	738
Reftele	92.1	1.0	1,974	20.7	56.7	8.7	10.8	0.4	2.6	0.0	416	1,506	21.1	76.3	1,090
Sävsjö	90.0	2.2	4,237	32.8	30.9	15.0	14.4	2.1	4.7	0.0	1,477	2,559	34.9	60.4	1,082
Södra Mo	94.0	0.6	1,080	21.0	39.3	22.4	14.9	0.4	2.0	0.0	231	827	21.4	76.6	596
Tranås	90.3	5.5	10,562	46.3	20.7	15.2	9.6	3.4	4.7	0.1	5,252	4,807	49.7	45.5	445
Unnaryd	90.5	0.6	1,062	17.9	53.2	7.3	17.6	0.8	3.2	0.0	199	829	18.7	78.1	630
Vaggeryd	92.8	3.5	6,683	36.0	27.3	13.5	12.8	3.7	6.6	0.0	2,656	3,584	39.7	53.6	928
Vetlanda	89.5	8.5	16,383	34.9	35.7	11.8	10.6	2.1	4.8	0.0	6,065	9,520	37.0	58.1	3,455
Villstad	91.8	1.4	2,700	39.3	34.6	10.7	11.1	1.0	3.2	0.0	1,087	1,525	40.3	56.5	438
Värnamo	91.2	8.4	16,180	35.1	29.8	13.4	12.8	3.0	5.8	0.1	6,161	9,061	38.1	56.0	2,900
Postal vote		11.5	22,079	30.8	17.0	22.4	20.5	2.5	6.3	0.4	7,359	13,224	33.3	59.9	5,865
Total	90.6	3.9	192,625	38.9	25.4	15.6	12.4	2.8	4.7	0.1	80,260	103,075	41.7	53.5	22,815
Source:SCB

=== Kalmar ===
Location	Turnout	Share	Votes	S	C	FP	M	VPK	KDS	Other	L-vote	R-vote	Left	Right	Margin
Location	%	%		%	%	%	%	%	%	%			%	%	
Borgholm	86.7	2.6	3,920	25.9	47.5	7.9	14.0	2.4	2.2	0.2	1,107	2,717	28.2	69.3	1,610
Emmaboda	89.2	4.2	6,427	47.6	32.0	6.3	9.4	3.5	1.3	0.1	3,279	3,061	51.0	47.6	218
Fliseryd	87.9	0.7	1,022	55.5	20.7	3.9	12.9	4.3	2.6	0.0	611	384	59.8	37.6	227
Hultsfred	90.3	7.4	11,327	43.7	30.5	7.8	11.2	2.4	4.3	0.1	5,222	5,606	46.1	49.5	384
Högsby	89.7	3.4	5,161	44.7	28.2	6.4	12.1	3.9	4.6	0.1	2,507	2,411	48.6	46.7	96
Kalmar	88.4	18.1	27,733	49.8	17.9	11.8	14.5	3.5	2.0	0.5	14,789	12,243	53.3	44.1	2,546
Mönsterås	87.7	2.2	3,346	47.0	21.6	8.7	12.6	5.8	4.2	0.1	1,768	1,435	52.8	42.9	333
Mörbylånga	89.2	2.2	3,425	42.0	31.7	9.2	14.8	1.0	1.4	0.0	1,472	1,906	43.0	55.6	434
Nybro	93.6	7.9	12,203	46.4	27.5	7.1	10.7	5.3	2.9	0.2	6,309	5,512	51.7	45.2	797
Oskarshamn	88.2	9.3	14,324	53.8	16.8	10.8	11.4	4.0	3.0	0.1	8,274	5,600	57.8	39.1	2,674
Torslunda	88.0	1.6	2,453	25.6	46.8	8.5	16.9	1.3	0.9	0.1	659	1,767	26.9	72.0	1,108
Torsås	87.1	3.1	4,712	31.9	41.1	6.9	15.6	0.5	4.0	0.1	1,524	2,996	32.3	63.6	1,472
Vimmerby	89.7	6.4	9,785	35.0	42.6	6.1	12.2	1.8	2.2	0.2	3,596	5,955	36.8	60.9	2,359
Västervik	87.7	15.0	22,988	52.9	21.5	8.7	10.1	5.0	1.7	0.2	13,299	9,253	57.9	40.3	4,046
Ålem	90.6	2.0	3,134	50.8	22.7	6.6	10.9	5.2	3.5	0.2	1,757	1,260	56.1	40.2	497
Ölands-Åkerbo	88.6	1.5	2,236	25.8	54.1	6.8	7.7	1.7	3.9	0.0	613	1,534	27.4	68.6	921
Postal vote		12.6	19,314	37.1	17.4	15.5	22.7	3.1	3.6	0.5	7,773	10,734	40.2	55.6	2,961
Total	88.6	3.1	153,510	45.0	25.4	9.6	13.4	3.5	2.7	0.3	74,559	74,374	48.6	48.4	185
Source:SCB

=== Kronoberg ===
Location	Turnout	Share	Votes	S	C	FP	M	VPK	KDS	Other	L-vote	R-vote	Left	Right	Margin
Location	%	%		%	%	%	%	%	%	%			%	%	
Alvesta	88.4	10.4	10,674	36.7	35.0	9.8	12.2	3.8	2.5	0.1	4,324	6,080	40.5	57.0	1,756
Lessebo	92.0	4.8	4,903	58.7	18.8	6.1	7.0	8.3	1.0	0.1	3,286	1,563	67.0	31.9	1,723
Ljungby	88.3	14.3	14,743	34.6	35.9	12.0	12.0	2.8	2.6	0.0	5,506	8,846	37.3	60.0	3,340
Markaryd	88.2	6.1	6,286	43.0	27.4	11.9	8.8	4.5	4.4	0.0	2,984	3,024	47.5	48.1	40
Tingsryd	86.1	8.6	8,817	32.4	38.0	8.5	16.2	3.6	1.2	0.0	3,176	5,532	36.0	62.7	2,356
Uppvidinge	89.2	6.8	7,056	44.2	32.0	6.3	9.0	7.4	1.0	0.1	3,640	3,341	51.6	47.3	299
Växjö	88.4	30.3	31,252	40.5	27.7	13.1	13.2	3.7	1.7	0.2	13,806	16,853	44.2	53.9	3,047
Älmhult	89.3	8.5	8,721	43.2	30.5	7.8	13.5	3.2	1.8	0.1	4,045	4,512	46.4	51.7	467
Postal vote		10.3	10,569	31.5	22.0	18.7	21.5	3.2	2.6	0.5	3,667	6,575	34.7	62.2	2,908
Total	88.4	2.1	103,021	39.1	30.0	11.5	13.2	4.0	2.1	0.1	44,434	56,326	43.1	54.7	11,892
Source:SCB

=== Norrbotten ===
Location	Turnout	Share	Votes	S	C	FP	M	VPK	KDS	Other	L-vote	R-vote	Left	Right	Margin
Location	%	%		%	%	%	%	%	%	%			%	%	
Arjeplog	82.2	1.5	2,255	49.7	14.3	8.1	2.8	22.5	2.7	0.0	1,628	567	72.2	25.1	1,061
Arvidsjaur	88.3	3.1	4,726	52.6	14.9	8.8	4.7	16.7	1.8	0.5	3,272	1,346	69.2	28.5	1,926
Boden	87.0	9.9	14,882	53.8	15.3	10.5	8.0	9.2	2.6	0.6	9,377	5,022	63.0	33.7	4,355
Gällivare	82.2	7.8	11,781	47.4	9.7	6.6	9.9	24.0	1.2	1.1	8,406	3,100	71.4	26.3	5,306
Haparanda	86.4	2.7	4,055	45.4	24.8	6.4	10.0	12.2	1.1	0.1	2,336	1,673	57.6	41.3	663
Jokkmokk	81.8	2.7	4,100	54.5	11.0	7.7	5.3	19.3	1.8	0.5	3,023	985	73.7	24.0	2,038
Kalix	90.8	6.8	10,266	62.9	16.5	4.9	6.0	8.3	1.1	0.3	7,309	2,817	71.2	27.4	4,492
Kiruna	80.6	8.4	12,638	51.7	8.6	10.9	5.3	21.4	1.7	0.4	9,233	3,133	73.1	24.8	6,100
Luleå	87.0	19.5	29,329	50.6	17.2	10.6	8.4	10.5	2.1	0.6	17,924	10,630	61.1	36.2	7,294
Pajala	85.8	3.7	5,491	46.0	16.1	3.4	7.5	24.1	2.4	0.6	3,850	1,479	70.1	26.9	2,371
Piteå	91.0	12.5	18,720	57.9	18.9	5.8	4.7	8.8	3.9	0.1	12,476	5,497	66.6	29.4	6,979
Älvsbyn	88.5	3.2	4,831	50.1	17.4	5.6	3.0	19.1	4.6	0.1	3,340	1,261	69.1	26.1	2,079
Överkalix	86.5	2.3	3,419	57.0	19.0	3.5	3.8	15.7	1.0	0.0	2,487	897	72.7	26.2	1,590
Övertorneå	86.4	2.4	3,664	38.7	30.8	2.9	9.0	17.3	0.8	0.3	2,053	1,569	56.0	42.8	484
Postal vote		13.4	20,159	47.2	14.4	11.5	11.9	10.6	2.6	1.8	11,643	7,611	57.8	37.8	4,032
Total	86.4	3.0	150,316	51.7	15.8	8.4	7.5	13.7	2.3	0.6	98,357	47,587	65.4	31.7	50,770
Source:SCB

=== Skåne ===
The province of Skåne, later unified into one county, was divided into Malmöhus and Kristianstad counties at the time, also resulting in three separate constituencies, one for each county and a third for the metropolitan area of Öresund, that was part of Malmöhus.

==== Kristianstad ====
Location	Turnout	Share	Votes	S	C	FP	M	VPK	KDS	Other	L-vote	R-vote	Left	Right	Margin
Location	%	%		%	%	%	%	%	%	%			%	%	
Bjärnum	90.9	1.6	2,690	42.0	30.6	11.1	9.9	1.3	5.1	0.0	1,164	1,388	43.3	51.6	224
Broby	89.0	1.3	2,208	49.0	21.8	10.6	10.1	3.3	5.2	0.0	1,154	940	52.3	42.6	214
Bromölla	92.3	2.9	4,857	68.1	10.3	9.0	4.4	7.2	0.8	0.0	3,660	1,154	75.4	23.8	2,506
Båstad	86.9	3.6	6,053	22.5	42.8	14.8	18.4	0.3	1.1	0.1	1,379	4,603	22.8	76.0	3,224
Degeberga	84.5	1.3	2,124	35.5	35.5	16.8	10.0	0.3	2.0	0.0	760	1,322	35.8	62.2	562
Glimåkra	88.1	0.9	1,564	48.3	28.1	10.1	6.7	3.6	3.1	0.0	812	703	51.9	44.9	109
Hjärsås	89.0	1.0	1,587	66.0	16.8	8.8	4.0	2.3	2.1	0.0	1,084	469	68.3	29.6	615
Hässleholm	87.9	6.5	10,798	44.2	21.8	17.7	11.0	1.9	3.4	0.0	4,974	5,459	46.1	50.6	485
Hästveda	88.5	1.0	1,644	31.0	43.9	7.4	10.6	1.6	5.5	0.0	537	1,016	32.7	61.8	479
Kivik	86.7	1.5	2,578	34.4	31.1	15.9	17.7	0.3	0.5	0.1	895	1,668	34.7	64.7	773
Klippan	89.8	3.2	5,256	52.2	23.8	11.4	10.0	1.9	0.7	0.1	2,844	2,373	54.1	45.1	471
Knislinge	89.7	1.5	2,578	61.2	18.1	9.7	5.7	2.4	3.0	0.0	1,639	862	63.6	33.4	777
Kristianstad	88.9	18.8	31,283	52.4	18.2	16.1	10.3	1.6	1.4	0.0	16,902	13,937	54.0	44.6	2,965
Kvidinge	87.7	0.7	1,230	33.1	38.5	8.7	17.2	1.1	1.5	0.0	420	791	34.1	64.3	371
Loshult	89.3	0.6	925	43.5	32.3	5.3	11.9	2.8	4.2	0.0	428	458	46.3	49.5	30
Näsum	84.8	0.7	1,112	48.8	27.0	7.6	7.1	6.0	3.4	0.0	610	464	54.9	41.7	146
Oppmanna-Vånga	88.5	0.9	1,462	43.1	34.3	10.6	8.2	1.0	2.8	0.0	645	776	44.1	53.1	131
Osby	88.4	2.7	4,480	45.5	27.1	10.9	11.2	2.4	3.1	0.0	2,146	2,193	47.9	49.0	47
Perstorp	88.4	2.3	3,906	47.0	23.0	14.1	11.2	3.1	1.6	0.1	1,957	1,886	50.1	48.3	71
Riseberga	86.2	1.5	2,509	36.9	34.8	12.1	14.2	1.5	0.4	0.0	964	1,534	38.4	61.1	570
Simrishamn	85.2	5.7	9,549	42.4	29.0	14.7	12.1	1.0	0.7	0.0	4,151	5,328	43.5	55.8	1,177
Sösdala	85.9	1.3	2,087	35.6	35.5	11.8	12.9	0.7	3.5	0.0	757	1,257	36.3	60.2	500
Tollarp	88.1	1.5	2,461	39.5	26.2	18.0	11.7	1.5	3.1	0.0	1,010	1,375	41.0	55.9	365
Tomelilla	84.2	4.6	7,723	34.9	36.0	15.1	12.1	0.4	1.4	0.0	2,733	4,880	35.4	63.2	2,147
Tyringe	88.2	2.6	4,363	34.8	35.5	12.4	10.7	2.9	3.8	0.0	1,645	2,556	37.7	58.6	911
Vinslöv	84.6	0.8	1,284	29.9	41.6	13.2	10.7	0.6	4.0	0.0	392	841	30.5	65.5	449
Vinslöv C	88.9	0.8	1,361	49.0	16.3	16.8	13.4	1.0	3.5	0.0	681	633	50.0	46.5	48
Vittsjö	90.8	1.4	2,264	27.9	35.5	15.7	15.0	1.6	4.3	0.0	668	1,498	29.5	66.2	830
Åstorp	90.1	2.7	4,421	58.8	18.1	10.2	10.0	2.1	0.8	0.0	2,695	1,690	61.0	38.2	1,005
Ängelholm	88.0	8.7	14,466	38.3	27.8	13.1	18.1	1.2	1.4	0.1	5,711	8,536	39.5	59.0	2,825
Örkelljunga	89.5	3.0	5,066	27.6	28.8	13.4	22.3	1.1	6.7	0.0	1,454	3,271	28.7	64.6	1,817
Örkened	89.3	1.4	2,367	47.4	27.2	10.6	6.7	6.8	1.3	0.0	1,284	1,053	54.2	44.5	231
Östra Ljungby	86.7	0.9	1,434	32.8	36.6	12.3	15.3	0.8	2.2	0.0	482	920	33.6	64.2	438
Postal vote		10.1	16,819	30.8	18.8	21.8	23.0	1.8	3.4	0.3	5,486	10,703	32.6	63.6	5,217
Total	88.1	3.3	166,509	42.7	25.4	14.6	13.2	1.8	2.3	0.1	74,123	88,537	44.5	53.2	14,414
Source:SCB

==== Malmö area ====
Location	Turnout	Share	Votes	S	C	FP	M	VPK	KDS	Other	L-vote	R-vote	Left	Right	Margin
Location	%	%		%	%	%	%	%	%	%			%	%	
Helsingborg	88.8	18.8	54,015	50.6	14.2	16.4	14.3	3.4	1.0	0.2	29,151	24,230	54.0	44.9	4,921
Landskrona	89.8	6.5	18,683	64.0	10.8	12.4	9.7	1.9	1.1	0.2	12,303	6,143	65.9	32.9	6,160
Lund	90.4	10.0	28,855	47.1	14.8	18.2	15.0	3.4	0.8	0.6	14,590	13,865	50.6	48.1	725
Malmö	88.8	50.4	144,693	53.4	12.4	16.0	14.1	3.2	0.7	0.2	81,848	61,528	56.6	42.5	20,320
Postal vote		14.2	40,901	34.8	11.8	23.5	25.5	2.7	1.1	0.7	15,316	24,846	37.4	60.7	9,530
Total	89.1	5.8	287,147	50.3	12.8	17.1	15.5	3.1	0.8	0.3	153,208	130,612	53.4	45.5	22,596
Source:SCB

==== Malmöhus County ====
Location	Turnout	Share	Votes	S	C	FP	M	VPK	KDS	Other	L-vote	R-vote	Left	Right	Margin
Location	%	%		%	%	%	%	%	%	%			%	%	
Bara	92.7	1.1	1,865	42.9	31.8	12.8	11.4	0.6	0.3	0.2	813	1,044	43.6	56.0	231
Billesholm	92.0	1.3	2,122	60.2	20.5	10.4	6.3	2.6	0.1	0.0	1,332	788	62.8	37.1	544
Bjuv	91.2	1.9	3,122	68.1	14.5	7.0	8.2	1.8	0.4	0.0	2,182	928	69.9	29.7	1,254
Bjärsjölagård	88.2	1.2	1,890	24.4	53.6	10.7	9.2	0.1	2.0	0.1	462	1,389	24.4	73.5	927
Blentarp	91.7	0.6	965	30.6	53.6	6.8	8.6	0.3	0.1	0.0	298	666	30.9	69.0	368
Burlöv	91.9	3.7	6,029	57.2	15.7	12.7	11.8	2.4	0.2	0.0	3,592	2,423	59.6	40.2	1,169
Dalby	91.9	1.5	2,427	48.5	31.1	9.6	9.4	0.9	0.3	0.1	1,198	1,219	49.4	50.2	21
Ekeby	92.0	1.1	1,876	63.6	23.1	6.3	4.9	1.8	0.3	0.0	1,226	644	65.4	34.3	582
Eslöv	88.7	8.9	14,543	47.5	30.5	11.5	9.3	0.2	0.9	0.0	6,937	7,468	47.7	51.4	531
Genarp	91.7	0.9	1,413	44.7	35.0	6.7	12.5	0.6	0.6	0.0	639	765	45.2	54.1	126
Härslöv	95.5	1.1	1,850	46.2	29.5	10.3	13.0	0.4	0.4	0.1	863	977	46.6	52.8	114
Höganäs	91.0	6.5	10,567	48.8	19.5	13.4	15.8	0.7	1.7	0.1	5,233	5,150	49.5	48.7	83
Hörby	87.5	3.6	5,812	27.2	41.2	19.7	8.6	0.5	2.8	0.0	1,610	4,042	27.7	69.5	2,432
Höör	87.2	3.1	5,061	32.2	34.8	17.4	13.7	0.4	1.4	0.0	1,651	3,337	32.6	65.9	1,686
Kävlinge	92.7	4.0	6,533	59.4	24.5	9.0	6.4	0.3	0.4	0.0	3,903	2,601	59.7	39.8	1,302
Lomma	92.5	3.7	6,074	47.5	20.0	15.7	15.5	1.1	0.1	0.0	2,952	3,113	48.6	51.3	161
Löddeköpinge	90.5	1.0	1,676	43.8	30.5	14.7	9.4	1.0	0.5	0.0	751	916	44.8	54.7	165
Månstorp	92.6	0.9	1,467	43.6	37.9	5.4	11.9	0.3	1.0	0.0	644	809	43.9	55.1	165
Räng	93.0	1.2	1,889	36.0	23.3	19.2	21.4	0.1	0.1	0.0	682	1,206	36.1	63.8	524
Sjöbo	89.4	1.6	2,627	49.0	31.1	13.2	6.0	0.4	0.2	0.1	1,299	1,320	49.4	50.2	21
Skanör-Falsterbo	92.8	0.9	1,463	21.5	21.1	21.7	34.1	0.5	1.0	0.0	322	1,126	22.0	77.0	804
Skurup	90.3	4.0	6,532	43.3	38.9	8.8	7.9	0.2	0.8	0.0	2,840	3,636	43.5	55.7	796
Staffanstorp	93.0	3.2	5,224	40.9	29.9	12.9	15.5	0.5	0.2	0.1	2,165	3,047	41.4	58.3	882
Svalöv	91.0	4.3	7,011	45.3	37.1	8.6	8.4	0.2	0.5	0.0	3,189	3,786	45.5	54.0	597
Svedala	92.2	2.4	3,882	59.3	23.3	8.3	6.4	1.0	1.5	0.0	2,342	1,480	60.3	38.1	862
Södra Sandby	93.0	1.4	2,278	49.0	30.8	8.8	10.8	0.6	0.4	0.1	1,131	1,135	49.6	49.8	4
Trelleborg	89.6	12.0	19,664	57.4	19.8	11.5	9.2	1.2	0.9	0.0	11,521	7,958	58.6	40.5	3,563
Veberöd	90.7	0.8	1,279	43.1	38.2	9.8	8.8	0.1	0.1	0.1	552	725	43.2	56.7	173
Vellinge	91.7	1.3	2,160	53.9	24.3	10.9	9.6	1.0	0.3	0.0	1,186	968	54.9	44.8	218
Vollsjö	86.6	1.1	1,744	21.3	55.8	12.6	10.1	0.1	0.2	0.0	372	1,369	21.3	78.5	997
Ystad	89.7	8.8	14,456	50.9	23.5	13.6	10.8	0.5	0.4	0.3	7,435	6,921	51.4	47.9	514
Östra Färs	85.9	1.2	2,029	22.0	53.3	12.8	11.3	0.0	0.6	0.0	446	1,571	22.0	77.4	1,125
Postal vote		9.8	15,961	32.6	21.5	19.0	23.9	1.2	1.4	0.4	5,397	10,277	33.8	64.4	4,880
Total	90.5	3.2	163,491	46.2	27.2	12.7	12.0	0.8	0.8	0.1	77,165	84,804	47.2	51.9	7,639
Source:SCB

=== Stockholm County ===
Stockholm County was divided into Stockholm Municipality and the surrounding county of suburbs or more rural areas.

==== Stockholm ====
Location	Turnout	Share	Votes	S	C	FP	M	VPK	KDS	Other	L-vote	R-vote	Left	Right	Margin
Location	%	%		%	%	%	%	%	%	%			%	%	
Stockholm	86.4	100.0	490,884	42.6	10.0	21.0	16.7	7.4	1.2	1.1	245,051	234,505	49.9	47.8	10,546
Total	86.4	9.9	490,884	42.6	10.0	21.0	16.7	7.4	1.2	1.1	245,051	234,505	49.9	47.8	10,546
Source:SCB

==== Stockholm County ====
Location	Turnout	Share	Votes	S	C	FP	M	VPK	KDS	Other	L-vote	R-vote	Left	Right	Margin
Location	%	%		%	%	%	%	%	%	%			%	%	
Botkyrka	89.9	2.7	10,543	48.4	13.9	20.5	11.0	4.8	0.6	0.8	5,608	4,782	53.2	45.4	826
Danderyd	91.6	3.3	12,898	24.5	11.1	24.1	35.3	3.6	0.9	0.5	3,634	9,080	28.2	70.4	5,446
Djurö	80.2	0.2	805	32.3	24.6	22.6	16.3	3.0	1.1	0.1	284	511	35.3	63.5	227
Ekerö	90.9	1.4	5,616	38.8	21.8	19.4	14.0	4.8	1.1	0.1	2,448	3,102	43.6	55.2	654
Gustavsberg	91.0	0.9	3,405	62.1	11.9	12.1	5.4	7.1	0.4	0.9	2,356	1,002	69.2	29.4	1,354
Haninge	88.1	4.5	17,922	46.8	18.5	18.2	8.5	6.9	0.6	0.5	9,611	8,105	53.6	45.2	1,506
Huddinge	89.0	6.4	25,158	45.3	15.9	19.8	9.2	7.8	1.1	0.9	13,353	11,295	53.1	44.9	2,058
Järfälla	89.6	5.1	20,247	43.7	15.4	22.6	11.3	5.4	1.1	0.5	9,943	9,979	49.1	49.3	36
Lidingö	90.9	4.0	15,930	29.8	12.3	24.1	28.1	4.3	0.6	0.8	5,437	10,276	34.1	64.5	4,839
Nacka	89.7	5.1	19,926	41.6	12.5	20.8	17.1	6.4	0.6	0.9	9,572	10,057	48.0	50.5	485
Norrtälje	86.3	5.1	20,014	44.4	28.5	11.8	10.4	3.1	1.6	0.2	9,515	10,152	47.5	50.7	637
Nynäshamn	89.7	1.5	5,731	63.2	11.1	12.3	5.6	6.6	0.8	0.3	4,001	1,666	69.8	29.1	2,335
Salem	88.3	0.9	3,549	42.1	17.0	22.6	11.7	4.2	1.4	0.9	1,642	1,825	46.3	51.4	183
Sigtuna	88.3	2.6	10,367	46.2	22.3	16.1	9.4	5.0	0.8	0.2	5,310	4,959	51.2	47.8	351
Sollentuna	91.2	4.6	18,063	40.3	15.7	22.7	13.8	5.4	1.6	0.5	8,258	9,425	45.7	52.2	1,167
Solna	87.9	7.1	27,897	45.0	11.2	20.3	13.5	7.6	1.2	1.1	14,693	12,570	52.7	45.1	2,123
Sorunda	90.0	0.4	1,576	43.1	36.8	7.3	6.2	5.6	1.0	0.1	767	792	48.7	50.3	25
Sundbyberg	88.7	3.7	14,621	54.2	11.0	16.5	8.2	8.4	0.7	1.1	9,151	5,207	62.6	35.6	3,944
Södertälje	87.8	8.4	33,105	52.4	16.4	14.6	8.6	5.9	1.4	0.7	19,291	13,128	58.3	39.7	6,163
Tyresö	89.7	2.8	11,010	44.0	14.9	23.0	9.6	7.1	0.7	0.6	5,631	5,231	51.1	47.5	400
Täby	91.4	4.2	16,489	35.4	16.5	22.3	19.9	4.3	0.7	0.9	6,548	9,678	39.7	58.7	3,130
Upplands-Bro	89.9	1.0	3,834	48.7	19.6	13.7	10.2	6.3	1.1	0.3	2,111	1,669	55.1	43.5	442
Upplands-Väsby	89.0	1.9	7,340	51.1	16.6	16.2	8.9	5.5	1.3	0.3	4,156	3,061	56.6	41.7	1,095
Vallentuna	90.6	1.5	5,922	39.0	24.8	17.1	13.2	4.2	1.1	0.5	2,561	3,262	43.2	55.1	701
Vaxholm	89.5	0.6	2,229	44.8	17.3	20.6	11.8	3.5	1.4	0.7	1,075	1,108	48.2	49.7	33
Värmdö	86.5	0.3	1,203	43.0	24.4	15.0	10.4	4.2	2.9	0.2	567	598	47.1	49.7	31
Ösmo	84.4	0.5	1,804	53.0	21.9	12.2	5.9	6.7	0.1	0.2	1,077	722	59.7	40.0	355
Österåker	89.8	1.6	6,499	41.1	20.6	19.4	14.2	3.9	0.3	0.5	2,924	3,523	45.0	54.2	599
Postal vote		17.9	70,423	33.7	13.4	23.1	24.3	3.4	1.2	0.8	26,107	42,862	37.1	60.9	16,755
Total	89.2	7.9	394,126	42.2	15.8	19.7	15.2	5.3	1.1	0.7	187,631	199,627	47.6	50.7	11,996
Source:SCB

=== Södermanland ===
Location	Turnout	Share	Votes	S	C	FP	M	VPK	KDS	Other	L-vote	R-vote	Left	Right	Margin
Location	%	%		%	%	%	%	%	%	%			%	%	
Daga	88.1	1.0	1,536	35.2	40.5	11.3	9.3	2.8	0.8	0.0	584	939	38.0	61.1	355
Eskilstuna	88.9	32.1	48,157	55.8	15.1	16.3	7.0	4.3	1.4	0.1	28,970	18,457	60.2	38.3	10,513
Flen	90.7	6.6	9,867	53.8	22.8	10.8	8.5	2.5	1.6	0.0	5,550	4,158	56.2	42.1	1,392
Gnesta	89.4	1.2	1,825	52.7	23.7	12.4	7.4	2.8	0.9	0.0	1,014	794	55.6	43.5	220
Katrineholm	90.7	12.5	18,704	56.5	19.3	12.3	7.5	1.9	2.4	0.1	10,913	7,321	58.3	39.1	3,592
Nyköping	90.3	16.9	25,397	55.6	19.5	11.4	9.2	2.1	1.9	0.2	14,656	10,195	57.7	40.1	4,461
Oxelösund	90.5	4.6	6,832	66.2	9.0	11.3	5.0	7.2	0.9	0.5	5,012	1,727	73.4	25.3	3,285
Strängnäs	90.6	7.5	11,304	47.5	21.1	16.6	11.0	2.3	1.5	0.0	5,622	5,512	49.7	48.8	110
Trosa	90.4	0.7	1,059	52.8	15.7	14.4	12.2	4.3	0.5	0.1	605	448	57.1	42.3	157
Vagnhärad	90.5	1.0	1,496	49.8	29.1	7.7	8.3	2.5	2.5	0.2	782	674	52.3	45.1	108
Vingåker	90.3	3.8	5,684	49.6	23.5	15.7	6.3	2.7	2.2	0.0	2,975	2,585	52.3	45.5	390
Postal vote		12.0	18,020	40.0	14.9	21.1	18.4	2.7	2.5	0.5	7,694	9,788	42.7	54.3	2,094
Total	89.9	3.0	149,881	53.1	17.8	14.8	9.1	3.2	1.8	0.7	84,377	62,598	56.3	41.8	21,779
Source:SCB

=== Uppsala ===
Location	Turnout	Share	Votes	S	C	FP	M	VPK	KDS	Other	L-vote	R-vote	Left	Right	Margin
Location	%	%		%	%	%	%	%	%	%			%	%	
Dannemora	92.8	1.7	2,283	53.6	24.1	6.8	4.1	7.8	3.5	0.0	1,403	800	61.5	35.0	603
Enköping	87.0	12.2	16,075	46.8	30.4	10.5	8.9	1.9	1.2	0.2	7,843	8,002	48.8	49.8	159
Håbo	88.7	2.0	2,581	51.4	22.9	13.4	8.3	3.3	0.6	0.1	1,411	1,151	54.7	44.6	260
Hållnäs	93.5	0.9	1,160	42.9	29.9	19.6	2.3	0.6	4.8	0.0	505	599	43.5	51.6	94
Oland	86.7	3.6	4,695	43.8	35.3	7.5	9.3	2.1	1.7	0.2	2,155	2,447	45.9	52.1	292
Söderfors	93.7	1.2	1,621	75.9	9.3	6.3	2.8	3.9	1.4	0.4	1,295	298	79.9	18.4	997
Tierp	90.9	2.0	2,640	62.0	18.1	10.4	5.2	2.0	2.1	0.2	1,691	890	64.1	33.7	801
Tierpsbygden	86.2	1.4	1,894	44.0	39.7	6.9	4.7	1.8	2.7	0.1	869	972	45.9	51.3	103
Uppsala	87.2	48.0	63,061	44.4	21.1	16.8	10.5	4.6	1.7	0.9	30,871	30,535	49.0	48.4	336
Vendel	89.7	1.9	2,509	52.9	25.9	10.6	5.8	1.8	2.9	0.1	1,372	1,061	54.7	42.3	311
Västland	92.9	1.2	1,563	58.7	26.9	5.2	1.9	2.9	3.9	0.5	962	532	61.5	34.0	430
Älvkarleby	91.2	4.4	5,725	76.2	10.4	6.4	2.3	3.7	0.7	0.5	4,571	1,087	79.8	19.0	3,484
Österlövsta	90.9	0.9	1,244	42.3	33.8	10.5	9.3	2.3	7.6	0.2	573	576	46.1	46.3	3
Östhammar	84.4	3.7	4,792	42.3	33.8	10.5	9.3	2.3	1.6	0.2	2,137	2,569	44.6	53.6	432
Postal vote		14.8	19,439	34.3	15.9	21.3	21.5	3.0	2.9	1.1	7,250	11,421	37.3	58.8	4,171
Total	87.7	2.6	131,282	45.8	22.5	14.7	10.8	3.2	1.8	0.7	64,908	62,940	49.4	47.9	1,968
Source:SCB

=== Värmland ===
Location	Turnout	Share	Votes	S	C	FP	M	VPK	KDS	Other	L-vote	R-vote	Left	Right	Margin
Location	%	%		%	%	%	%	%	%	%			%	%	
Arvika	88.3	8.7	16,001	48.4	22.3	15.4	7.4	5.8	0.7	0.1	8,664	7,209	54.1	45.1	1,455
Eda	88.7	3.2	5,935	55.3	24.5	8.9	6.3	3.9	1.1	0.0	3,518	2,354	59.3	39.7	1,164
Ekshärad	90.2	1.7	3,213	49.9	33.9	2.8	5.0	5.6	2.4	0.3	1,785	1,340	55.6	41.7	445
Filipstad	89.1	5.1	9,350	65.5	12.0	9.1	6.1	6.4	0.7	0.1	6,719	2,549	71.9	27.3	4,170
Finnskoga-Dalby	87.9	1.5	2,694	59.7	16.1	5.2	5.8	12.8	0.4	0.0	1,951	731	72.4	27.1	1,220
Forshaga	90.6	1.5	2,828	67.9	12.9	9.2	5.0	3.2	1.6	0.3	2,012	764	71.1	27.0	1,248
Grums	88.8	3.2	5,795	62.3	19.8	7.5	3.8	5.0	1.4	0.2	3,899	1,804	67.3	31.1	2,095
Gustav Adolf	92.4	0.3	494	75.1	11.9	2.6	2.4	7.5	0.2	0.2	408	84	82.6	17.0	324
Hagfors	92.8	2.9	5,264	73.4	8.1	5.3	2.8	9.9	0.3	0.2	4,388	850	83.4	16.1	3,538
Hammarö	91.9	3.3	6,006	65.9	12.0	10.0	5.1	6.1	0.3	0.5	4,320	1,634	71.9	27.2	2,686
Karlstad	89.1	21.0	38,599	49.5	18.6	15.2	11.5	4.0	0.9	0.2	20,658	17,495	53.5	45.3	3,163
Kil	90.3	2.6	4,709	40.7	30.2	14.9	9.5	3.4	1.0	0.3	2,078	2,572	44.1	54.6	494
Kristinehamn	89.1	8.2	15,084	53.3	17.6	13.5	9.4	4.5	1.5	0.1	8,730	6,107	57.9	40.5	2,623
Munkfors	93.0	1.9	3,496	72.2	10.6	8.7	2.8	4.7	0.8	0.2	2,686	776	76.8	22.2	1,910
Norra Ny	90.0	0.8	1,439	47.7	28.4	5.6	10.3	6.7	1.3	0.0	784	636	54.5	44.2	148
Norra Råda	90.5	1.6	3,009	62.7	12.3	7.5	4.2	12.6	0.7	0.1	2,265	721	75.3	24.0	1,544
Storfors	93.3	1.7	3,174	63.8	18.2	7.6	5.6	3.5	0.8	0.5	2,136	997	67.3	31.4	1,139
Sunne	88.6	4.9	8,986	36.9	37.0	11.4	12.0	1.6	1.0	0.1	3,459	5,430	38.5	60.4	1,971
Säffle	87.3	5.9	10,900	40.3	35.8	9.4	8.7	4.0	1.7	0.1	4,826	5,878	44.3	53.9	1,052
Torsby	87.5	3.4	6,223	45.2	26.5	7.3	10.2	8.9	1.2	0.8	3,364	2,738	54.1	44.0	626
Töcksmark	82.0	0.7	1,370	34.3	25.1	23.1	13.4	0.5	3.4	0.2	477	843	34.8	61.5	366
Ullerud	91.3	1.6	2,897	63.0	21.0	5.4	4.5	4.9	0.7	0.1	1,969	905	68.0	31.2	1,064
Årjäng	77.4	2.2	4,078	31.2	39.1	13.5	10.3	2.0	3.8	0.1	1,356	2,566	33.3	62.9	1,210
Postal vote		12.1	22,213	42.2	16.2	18.9	16.8	3.8	1.5	0.6	10,207	11,543	46.0	52.0	1,336
Total	88.9	3.7	183,757	51.1	20.1	14.3	7.6	4.3	2.2	0.3	102,659	78,526	55.9	42.7	24,133
Source:SCB

=== Västerbotten ===
Location	Turnout	Share	Votes	S	C	FP	M	VPK	KDS	Other	L-vote	R-vote	Left	Right	Margin
Location	%	%		%	%	%	%	%	%	%			%	%	
Bjurholm	90.8	1.6	2,355	35.1	23.8	23.8	12.9	1.1	3.4	0.0	851	1,424	36.1	60.5	573
Burträsk	86.1	2.6	3,858	30.1	42.5	14.9	9.1	1.1	2.2	0.0	1,207	2,565	31.3	66.5	1,358
Bygdeå	91.5	2.2	3,198	39.2	37.5	14.6	4.1	0.9	3.7	0.0	1,281	1,798	40.1	56.2	517
Dorotea	88.9	1.6	2,304	61.1	11.0	21.3	1.8	3.8	1.1	0.0	1,495	784	64.9	34.0	711
Fredrika	90.1	0.5	692	59.0	21.1	13.2	4.3	1.2	1.3	0.0	416	267	60.1	38.6	149
Holmsund	92.6	2.4	3,548	71.1	7.0	12.0	2.1	5.8	1.6	0.4	2,730	749	76.9	21.1	1,981
Holmön	75.0	0.1	101	26.7	22.8	36.6	13.9	0.0	0.0	0.0	27	74	26.7	73.3	47
Hörnefors	91.0	1.3	1,907	68.2	17.9	8.2	1.9	1.2	1.8	0.7	1,323	536	69.4	28.1	787
Lycksele	87.4	5.3	7,750	48.0	14.4	19.3	6.4	2.6	9.0	0.4	3,922	3,103	50.6	40.0	819
Lövånger	88.0	1.3	1,901	18.8	38.3	20.0	16.8	1.1	4.9	0.0	378	1,429	19.9	75.2	1,051
Malå	84.1	1.6	2,313	53.0	14.9	18.9	4.8	5.0	3.3	0.0	1,341	894	58.0	38.7	447
Nordmaling	90.2	3.3	4,880	46.0	26.4	13.1	9.4	0.9	4.2	0.0	2,290	2,384	46.9	48.9	94
Norsjö	84.5	2.3	3,337	44.7	20.1	18.2	7.3	6.5	3.0	0.1	1,708	1,525	51.2	45.7	183
Nysätra	87.8	1.1	1,567	22.6	41.2	20.2	12.6	1.0	2.3	0.0	370	1,160	23.6	74.0	790
Skellefteå	87.6	23.4	34,150	54.6	18.7	12.4	7.1	3.7	3.1	0.4	19,904	13,026	58.3	38.1	6,878
Sorsele	83.2	1.6	2,313	41.0	15.7	24.3	3.8	6.1	8.8	0.2	1,089	1,016	47.1	43.9	73
Storuman	84.8	3.1	4,550	41.1	16.1	24.9	7.1	3.5	7.3	0.0	2,028	2,189	44.6	48.1	161
Sävar	88.8	1.4	2,016	31.6	39.9	16.3	8.1	1.2	2.8	0.0	663	1,296	32.9	64.3	633
Umeå	88.2	19.6	28,570	42.6	23.7	19.8	8.3	2.7	2.3	0.7	12,941	14,792	45.3	51.8	1,851
Vilhelmina	88.6	3.3	4,753	50.3	17.5	19.1	4.6	3.0	5.6	0.0	2,531	1,958	53.3	41.2	573
Vindeln	88.0	3.0	4,431	35.6	30.4	20.0	8.7	1.1	4.2	0.0	1,627	2,618	36.7	59.1	991
Vännäs	88.2	2.7	3,876	39.4	33.7	12.3	9.2	2.4	2.8	0.2	1,619	2,143	41.8	55.3	524
Åsele	86.3	1.6	2,338	53.4	20.5	16.1	4.2	2.6	3.1	0.0	1,309	955	56.0	40.8	354
Postal vote		13.1	19,033	41.3	17.2	21.5	11.5	2.5	4.6	1.4	8,335	9,561	43.8	50.2	1,226
Total	87.9	2.9	145,741	46.1	21.6	17.4	7.8	2.9	3.7	0.5	71,385	68,246	49.0	46.8	3,139
Source:SCB

=== Västernorrland ===
Location	Turnout	Share	Votes	S	C	FP	M	VPK	KDS	Other	L-vote	R-vote	Left	Right	Margin
Location	%	%		%	%	%	%	%	%	%			%	%	
Bjärtrå	90.7	1.0	1,693	62.7	21.8	3.2	2.1	8.7	1.2	0.4	1,208	458	71.4	27.1	750
Boteå	91.5	0.9	1,517	58.4	28.4	1.3	3.0	7.1	1.5	0.3	994	497	65.5	32.8	497
Fjällsjö	88.6	2.0	3,488	54.4	27.0	3.3	4.0	9.5	1.7	0.0	2,230	1,196	63.9	34.3	1,034
Härnösand	89.1	7.4	13,111	47.3	29.1	7.9	8.1	5.5	1.9	0.2	6,920	5,918	52.8	45.1	1,002
Indals-Liden	88.3	1.3	2,286	48.8	33.3	6.6	4.0	4.0	3.3	0.0	1,206	1,004	52.8	43.9	202
Kramfors	92.7	4.0	7,043	64.2	14.1	3.2	2.6	14.5	0.8	0.5	5,549	1,402	78.8	19.9	4,147
Matfors	86.8	2.1	3,715	48.2	33.8	7.8	2.5	6.0	1.7	0.0	2,014	1,636	54.2	44.0	378
Njurunda	88.9	3.9	6,967	58.1	17.4	8.9	2.8	11.4	1.2	0.1	4,844	2,030	69.5	29.1	2,814
Noraström	91.1	0.8	1,489	36.1	45.3	4.3	6.3	5.8	2.1	0.1	625	832	42.0	55.9	207
Nordingrå	94.7	0.9	1,622	39.5	42.4	5.2	7.5	0.7	4.6	0.1	653	893	40.3	55.1	240
Ramsele	89.9	1.4	2,464	55.6	26.8	2.3	3.8	9.1	2.3	0.1	1,594	810	64.7	32.9	784
Sollefteå	90.0	7.1	12,603	57.6	25.0	4.3	5.7	6.1	1.3	0.1	8,031	4,402	63.7	34.9	3,629
Stöde	86.2	1.1	1,945	45.9	34.3	7.4	2.6	7.7	2.2	0.0	1,042	860	53.6	44.2	182
Sundsvall	87.3	18.6	33,026	53.0	18.2	13.5	6.5	6.7	1.9	0.1	19,722	12,631	59.7	38.2	7,091
Timrå	89.9	5.4	9,557	61.5	18.2	7.5	2.4	8.5	1.9	0.0	6,685	2,688	69.9	28.1	3,997
Ullånger	91.5	1.0	1,693	37.9	45.2	6.0	4.8	1.8	4.1	0.2	672	949	39.7	56.1	277
Ytterlännäs	91.8	2.4	4,250	63.7	20.5	3.1	3.2	7.3	1.7	0.5	3,018	1,138	71.0	26.8	1,880
Ånge	87.7	4.8	8,492	54.9	25.3	6.3	2.5	9.1	1.9	0.1	5,436	2,889	64.0	34.0	2,547
Örnsköldsvik	89.5	19.2	34,107	51.8	23.5	10.9	4.3	4.4	4.8	0.3	19,174	13,212	56.2	38.7	5,962
Postal vote		14.9	26,551	43.3	21.6	14.3	12.2	5.1	2.8	0.7	12,866	12,755	48.5	48.0	111
Total	89.1	3.6	177,619	52.2	23.0	9.5	5.9	6.6	2.5	0.3	104,483	68,200	58.8	38.4	36,283
Source:SCB

=== Västmanland ===
Location	Turnout	Share	Votes	S	C	FP	M	VPK	KDS	Other	L-vote	R-vote	Left	Right	Margin
Location	%	%		%	%	%	%	%	%	%			%	%	
Arboga	89.1	4.9	7,334	58.3	17.4	12.9	6.1	3.9	1.1	0.2	4,565	2,673	62.2	36.4	1,892
Fagersta	89.6	5.5	8,184	66.9	10.9	11.2	4.5	5.4	0.9	0.2	5,910	2,184	72.2	26.7	3,726
Hallstahammar	90.2	6.1	9,046	63.9	12.8	10.0	5.3	6.5	1.3	0.3	6,365	2,538	70.4	28.1	3,827
Heby	87.1	5.2	7,778	43.8	35.9	9.6	4.9	4.2	1.4	0.2	3,732	3,918	48.0	50.4	186
Kungsör	91.2	2.9	4,346	53.3	21.3	13.9	5.6	4.9	1.0	0.0	2,530	1,772	58.2	40.8	758
Köping	88.9	9.3	13,797	58.7	18.8	10.3	5.0	4.2	2.0	0.9	8,687	4,707	63.0	34.1	3,980
Norberg	88.7	2.5	3,652	65.1	15.1	6.7	5.6	5.6	1.5	0.4	2,580	1,000	70.6	27.4	1,580
Sala	87.8	7.5	11,072	40.6	34.7	13.1	7.7	2.1	1.0	0.8	4,729	6,147	42.7	55.5	1,418
Skinnskatteberg	90.6	1.9	2,895	64.6	16.5	7.7	4.5	5.4	1.2	0.1	2,027	832	70.0	28.7	1,195
Surahammar	92.0	3.5	5,236	68.7	11.1	7.8	3.4	7.8	0.9	0.3	4,004	1,167	76.5	22.3	2,837
Västerås	86.4	37.4	55,526	52.8	15.3	17.9	7.1	5.2	1.3	0.2	32,219	22,425	58.0	40.4	9,794
Postal vote		13.3	19,721	43.2	14.4	21.4	14.5	3.8	1.9	0.8	9,272	9,917	47.0	50.3	645
Total	87.9	3.0	148,587	53.5	17.8	14.8	7.3	4.8	1.4	0.4	86,620	59,280	58.3	39.9	27,340
Source:SCB

=== Västra Götaland ===
The later iteration of Västra Götaland County was divided into three separate counties and five constituencies in 1973. The three counties were Gothenburg and Bohuslän, Skaraborg and Älvsborg. Gothenburg/Bohus were divided into one constituency representing Gothenburg Municipality and one representing Bohuslän, whereas Älvsborg was divided into two constituencies, one in the north and one in the south. Skaraborg had one constituency for the whole county.

==== Bohuslän ====
Location	Turnout	Share	Votes	S	C	FP	M	VPK	KDS	Other	L-vote	R-vote	Left	Right	Margin
Location	%	%		%	%	%	%	%	%	%			%	%	
Askim	92.3	3.1	4,879	19.5	11.4	42.7	22.6	2.5	1.1	0.2	1,075	3,740	22.0	76.7	2,665
Härryda	90.7	4.8	7,504	36.1	19.2	26.5	11.8	5.4	0.7	0.3	3,114	4,314	41.5	57.5	1,200
Kungälv	90.3	8.3	12,953	37.2	22.7	22.1	13.6	3.0	1.3	0.2	5,210	7,556	40.2	58.3	2,346
Lysekil	89.3	5.1	7,930	56.5	12.3	18.2	9.2	3.0	0.7	0.2	4,718	3,147	59.5	39.7	1,571
Munkedal	89.2	1.8	2,788	57.4	23.0	9.6	7.1	1.9	0.9	0.1	1,653	1,107	59.3	39.7	546
Mölndal	88.7	14.2	22,030	40.6	13.8	28.0	8.8	7.3	0.9	0.6	10,559	11,132	47.9	50.5	573
Orust	82.1	3.3	5,063	29.1	31.7	24.4	13.3	1.2	0.4	0.0	1,530	3,513	30.2	69.4	1,983
Partille	90.9	8.1	12,547	36.0	11.7	33.2	10.0	7.7	1.3	0.2	5,479	6,888	43.7	54.9	1,409
Smögen	86.9	0.6	934	21.9	10.9	51.2	12.3	2.1	1.5	0.0	225	695	24.1	74.4	470
Stenungsund	86.8	3.7	5,682	34.9	27.6	21.8	11.5	3.6	0.4	0.2	2,189	3,457	38.5	60.8	1,268
Strömstad	84.8	3.5	5,480	46.2	25.0	17.9	8.1	1.4	1.2	0.1	2,610	2,797	47.6	51.0	187
Styrsö	87.0	1.0	1,522	13.1	12.1	52.4	13.5	1.6	7.3	0.0	225	1,186	14.8	77.9	961
Svarteborg	86.7	1.0	1,600	25.6	37.7	20.7	13.3	1.8	0.9	0.0	438	1,148	27.4	71.8	710
Södra Sotenäs	86.7	1.8	2,759	50.5	16.8	24.0	4.9	3.1	0.7	0.0	1,479	1,260	53.6	45.7	219
Sörbygden	87.1	0.8	1,230	12.7	48.8	13.2	23.8	0.8	0.7	0.0	166	1,055	13.5	85.8	889
Tanum	85.4	4.2	6,493	27.1	37.7	20.3	13.6	0.6	0.5	0.1	1,803	4,655	27.8	71.7	2,852
Tjörn	83.3	3.2	4,947	18.6	19.1	43.8	13.3	1.1	4.0	0.0	976	3,771	19.7	76.2	2,795
Tossene	88.0	1.1	1,757	61.4	13.8	15.2	6.8	2.1	0.7	0.0	1,115	629	63.5	35.8	486
Uddevalla	87.3	15.9	24,786	47.3	19.4	18.9	9.8	3.9	0.7	0.1	12,685	11,922	51.2	48.1	763
Öckerö	86.1	3.0	4,603	20.9	16.5	35.0	18.3	1.2	7.9	0.0	1,020	3,216	22.2	69.9	2,196
Postal vote		11.7	18,166	28.3	13.9	34.0	18.9	2.9	1.3	0.6	5,678	12,139	31.3	66.8	6,461
Total	88.0	3.0	155,653	37.3	18.8	26.4	12.2	3.8	1.3	0.2	63,947	89,327	41.1	57.4	25,380
Source:SCB

==== Gothenburg ====
Location	Turnout	Share	Votes	S	C	FP	M	VPK	KDS	Other	L-vote	R-vote	Left	Right	Margin
Location	%	%		%	%	%	%	%	%	%			%	%	
Gothenburg	86.4	100.0	273,369	37.9	9.3	31.9	10.5	8.3	1.0	1.1	126,190	141,486	46.2	51.8	15,296
Total	86.4	5.5	273,369	37.9	9.3	31.9	10.5	8.3	1.0	1.1	126,190	141,486	46.2	51.8	15,296
Source:SCB

==== Skaraborg ====
Location	Turnout	Share	Votes	S	C	FP	M	VPK	KDS	Other	L-vote	R-vote	Left	Right	Margin
Location	%	%		%	%	%	%	%	%	%			%	%	
Dimbo	88.0	0.9	1,443	26.1	47.3	8.0	15.2	1.5	1.9	0.1	398	1,017	27.6	70.5	619
Essunga	89.2	2.2	3,485	17.0	43.3	13.2	23.8	1.2	1.6	0.0	633	2,797	18.2	80.3	2,164
Falköping	88.4	5.2	8,378	44.9	23.3	15.8	10.8	2.5	2.9	0.5	3,973	4,120	47.4	49.2	147
Fröjered	90.8	0.7	1,059	29.2	43.4	10.7	11.4	0.7	4.6	0.0	316	694	29.8	65.5	378
Frökind	91.6	0.7	1,181	14.2	54.9	8.9	19.5	0.1	2.2	0.3	169	983	14.3	83.2	814
Fågelås	88.8	0.7	1,129	35.3	29.8	7.3	17.0	2.1	8.4	0.0	423	611	37.5	54.1	188
Grästorp	88.7	2.0	3,260	21.7	42.1	15.8	18.0	1.4	0.9	0.0	754	2,476	23.1	76.0	1,722
Gudhem	90.8	0.8	1,335	27.5	48.5	6.7	12.8	1.2	3.2	0.0	383	909	28.7	68.1	526
Gullspång	87.6	2.4	3,888	38.7	36.7	10.8	9.1	2.2	2.5	0.0	1,590	2,201	40.9	56.6	611
Götene	88.9	4.3	6,957	37.7	27.6	14.8	12.2	2.7	5.0	0.0	2,809	3,795	40.4	54.5	986
Habo	90.1	1.7	2,794	30.7	31.8	16.4	12.2	1.3	7.6	0.1	892	1,687	31.9	60.4	795
Hjo	87.9	1.9	2,986	41.3	23.1	16.0	12.8	2.2	4.7	0.0	1,299	1,548	43.5	51.8	249
Hökensås	89.2	1.0	1,642	31.4	45.7	10.6	8.8	1.3	2.2	0.0	537	1,069	32.7	65.1	532
Karlsborg	90.4	3.1	5,057	47.1	25.9	14.9	7.7	1.9	2.4	0.0	2,477	2,457	49.0	48.6	20
Kvänum	89.7	1.5	2,441	22.0	47.4	11.6	17.9	0.6	0.5	0.0	551	1,878	22.6	76.9	1,327
Larv	88.3	0.9	1,378	22.4	44.6	12.6	18.1	0.9	1.4	0.1	321	1,037	23.3	75.3	716
Lidköping	87.0	11.8	18,902	40.2	25.4	17.3	9.8	5.3	1.9	0.1	8,589	9,929	45.4	52.5	1,340
Mariestad	88.1	7.9	12,738	42.5	24.9	14.8	10.6	3.9	3.0	0.3	5,908	6,408	46.4	50.3	500
Mullsjö	90.2	1.4	2,307	30.3	32.5	19.6	9.0	1.5	7.2	0.0	732	1,410	31.7	61.1	678
Skara	88.6	5.6	9,009	39.6	30.1	14.4	12.8	1.8	1.3	0.0	3,723	5,162	41.3	57.3	1,439
Skövde	87.5	13.9	22,298	39.8	27.3	16.7	10.3	3.6	2.2	0.2	9,679	12,097	43.4	54.3	2,418
Stenstorp	89.4	1.3	2,073	29.3	42.5	10.5	15.4	1.4	1.0	0.0	637	1,416	30.7	68.3	779
Tibro	89.1	3.5	5,623	40.1	29.8	15.8	7.4	2.9	4.0	0.1	2,416	2,980	43.0	53.0	564
Tidaholm	91.1	2.8	4,436	59.7	14.2	11.7	6.2	5.2	2.8	0.2	2,878	1,424	64.9	32.1	1,454
Töreboda	87.0	3.6	5,837	34.7	39.7	10.5	11.1	2.1	1.8	0.1	2,146	3,580	36.8	61.3	1,434
Vara	87.5	4.1	6,519	22.6	39.1	13.6	21.3	1.7	1.7	0.0	1,585	4,822	24.3	74.0	3,237
Vartofta	90.9	1.2	1,891	20.4	54.2	7.7	15.7	0.5	1.6	0.0	395	1,465	20.9	77.5	1,070
Vilske	89.4	1.8	2,953	18.3	47.9	10.5	18.1	1.0	4.1	0.1	571	2,258	19.3	76.5	1,687
Postal vote		11.0	17,648	28.2	20.2	23.7	21.0	2.5	4.0	0.5	5,410	11,451	30.7	64.9	6,041
Total	88.4	3.2	160,647	35.9	29.8	15.5	12.9	2.8	2.8	0.2	62,194	93,681	38.7	58.3	31,487
Source:SCB

==== Älvsborg N ====
Location	Turnout	Share	Votes	S	C	FP	M	VPK	KDS	Other	L-vote	R-vote	Left	Right	Margin
Location	%	%		%	%	%	%	%	%	%			%	%	
Alingsås	88.7	8.2	11,099	45.1	16.4	23.8	8.7	3.1	2.7	0.2	5,347	5,435	48.2	49.0	88
Bengtsfors	86.9	5.3	7,262	46.4	29.8	12.2	7.1	1.7	2.8	0.0	3,490	3,566	48.1	49.1	76
Bjärke	87.8	2.1	2,860	20.0	38.6	25.2	11.2	0.8	4.0	0.1	597	2,148	20.9	75.1	1,551
Brålanda	89.6	1.6	2,116	12.9	60.3	5.9	14.7	0.2	5.9	0.0	279	1,712	13.2	80.9	1,433
Dals-Ed	83.9	2.1	2,833	27.3	45.0	12.3	9.6	1.1	4.7	0.0	804	1,896	28.4	66.9	1,092
Frändefors	86.2	1.2	1,628	15.7	52.6	11.5	16.5	0.9	2.9	0.0	269	1,312	16.5	80.6	1,043
Färgelanda	90.4	1.6	2,185	45.7	34.9	6.5	11.3	0.8	0.8	0.0	1,016	1,151	46.5	52.7	135
Gäsene	91.3	2.2	3,020	19.4	42.2	13.2	23.0	0.9	1.3	0.0	613	2,367	20.3	78.4	1,754
Hemsjö	88.8	0.9	1,218	28.4	26.3	24.5	16.5	2.5	1.7	0.2	376	819	30.9	67.2	443
Herrljunga	91.4	1.9	2,544	34.4	28.4	21.7	11.7	2.3	1.5	0.0	932	1,574	36.6	61.9	642
Högsäter	83.1	1.2	1,573	11.8	64.0	8.1	13.8	0.3	2.0	0.0	190	1,351	12.1	85.9	1,161
Lerum	91.1	8.2	11,127	32.2	18.8	31.5	11.9	3.8	1.7	0.1	4,001	6,924	36.0	62.2	2,923
Lilla Edet	88.5	3.8	5,238	52.4	26.9	11.0	5.0	3.4	1.1	0.1	2,925	2,250	55.8	43.0	675
Mellerud	88.5	4.6	6,305	34.6	40.9	11.2	9.5	0.8	3.0	0.0	2,233	3,883	35.4	61.6	1,650
Nödinge	90.0	2.9	3,934	59.2	12.8	16.9	3.9	5.8	1.1	0.3	2,557	1,322	65.0	33.6	1,235
Skepplanda	87.6	1.0	1,296	27.2	49.9	11.0	6.8	3.5	1.7	0.0	397	877	30.6	67.7	480
Starrkärr	89.2	2.6	3,553	44.7	24.9	16.7	5.2	4.7	3.6	0.2	1,756	1,662	49.4	46.8	94
Trollhättan	87.7	18.2	24,796	54.0	17.8	16.4	5.4	5.0	1.3	0.1	14,615	9,843	58.9	39.7	4,772
Vårgårda	90.7	3.5	4,741	22.4	36.5	22.0	15.5	0.7	2.8	0.1	1,094	3,513	23.1	74.1	2,419
Vänersborg	87.5	7.9	10,769	48.4	16.4	22.2	8.5	3.3	1.2	0.1	5,564	5,068	51.7	47.1	496
Västra Tunhem	91.1	2.4	3,333	58.2	17.7	12.9	4.8	4.6	1.8	0.1	2,091	1,181	62.7	35.4	910
Åmål	86.5	5.5	7,417	47.8	23.6	14.0	9.8	2.7	2.1	0.0	3,743	3,518	50.5	47.4	225
Postal vote		11.2	15,231	33.2	18.1	26.7	16.8	2.4	2.5	0.4	5,412	9,373	35.5	61.5	3,961
Total	88.4	2.7	136,078	41.3	24.8	18.8	9.8	3.0	2.1	0.1	60,301	72,745	44.3	55.5	12,444
Source:SCB

==== Älvsborg S ====
Location	Turnout	Share	Votes	S	C	FP	M	VPK	KDS	Other	L-vote	R-vote	Left	Right	Margin
Location	%	%		%	%	%	%	%	%	%			%	%	
Bollebygd	91.2	2.7	3,034	38.8	27.1	10.2	21.0	1.8	1.1	0.1	1,230	1,769	40.5	58.3	539
Borås	89.7	34.1	38,138	47.0	14.5	16.3	16.2	4.5	0.9	0.5	19,642	17,942	51.5	47.0	1,700
Dalsjöfors	93.3	4.5	5,072	41.8	27.9	11.2	15.7	1.5	1.8	0.1	2,194	2,781	43.3	54.8	587
Dalstorp	94.1	1.7	1,953	26.0	47.5	10.4	14.9	0.8	0.4	0.0	524	1,422	26.8	72.8	898
Fristad	92.4	3.2	3,528	28.2	32.3	13.9	21.6	2.8	1.1	0.1	1,094	2,393	31.0	67.8	1,299
Hökerum	93.1	1.7	1,901	14.8	45.8	10.2	26.9	1.1	1.2	0.0	301	1,577	15.8	83.0	1,276
Mark	92.0	15.7	17,521	44.8	27.7	7.2	15.8	3.2	1.1	0.1	8,404	8,901	48.0	50.8	497
Redväg	91.7	3.6	3,983	15.2	45.1	17.1	17.8	0.4	4.4	0.0	622	3,184	15.6	79.9	2,562
Sandhult	92.3	3.4	3,755	34.2	29.0	14.3	18.3	3.0	1.0	0.2	1,397	2,311	37.2	61.5	914
Svenljunga	90.2	5.3	5,898	31.7	37.8	8.6	20.2	0.6	1.0	0.0	1,906	3,931	32.3	66.6	2,025
Tranemo	92.3	4.1	4,628	42.6	32.1	10.0	13.7	1.3	0.4	0.0	2,030	2,578	43.9	55.7	548
Ulricehamn	89.4	4.2	4,704	38.6	20.9	20.0	16.8	0.9	2.4	0.4	1,856	2,717	39.5	57.8	861
Viskafors	94.4	2.8	3,164	58.2	25.3	5.0	8.4	2.8	0.3	0.1	1,930	1,222	61.0	38.6	708
Åsunden	93.1	2.6	2,901	30.1	40.7	10.9	16.9	0.4	1.1	0.0	884	1,986	30.5	68.5	1,102
Postal vote		10.5	11,697	30.4	16.5	20.7	27.7	2.5	1.6	0.6	3,850	7,591	32.9	64.9	3,741
Total	91.1	2.2	111,877	39.9	24.2	13.7	17.8	2.9	1.2	0.3	47,864	62,305	42.8	55.7	14,441
Source:SCB

=== Örebro ===
Location	Turnout	Share	Votes	S	C	FP	M	VPK	KDS	Other	L-vote	R-vote	Left	Right	Margin
Location	%	%		%	%	%	%	%	%	%			%	%	
Askersund	86.8	3.6	6,225	49.3	30.0	8.4	6.1	2.3	3.7	0.1	3,214	2,772	51.6	44.5	442
Degerfors	93.3	3.9	6,723	66.4	16.1	7.0	3.8	4.7	1.7	0.3	4,782	1,804	71.1	26.8	2,978
Glanshammar	87.7	1.2	2,133	27.6	45.6	14.3	11.1	0.8	0.7	0.0	605	1,514	28.4	71.0	909
Hallsberg	89.4	5.3	9,285	52.9	24.0	11.6	5.5	3.7	2.0	0.2	5,255	3,819	56.6	41.1	1,436
Hällefors	89.7	3.6	6,259	67.2	11.9	7.7	3.3	8.9	1.0	0.0	4,761	1,434	76.1	22.9	3,327
Karlskoga	89.5	12.1	21,068	58.6	15.0	11.4	5.7	7.9	1.1	0.3	14,020	6,760	66.5	32.1	7,260
Kumla	88.2	5.4	9,399	50.1	21.3	13.8	5.9	5.1	3.4	0.4	5,189	3,846	55.2	40.9	1,343
Laxå	87.2	2.7	4,771	54.8	19.9	11.3	4.5	5.9	3.4	0.2	2,895	1,703	60.7	35.7	1,192
Lindesberg	89.4	7.8	13,552	49.6	28.2	10.3	6.2	3.2	2.3	0.2	7,160	6,066	52.8	44.8	1,094
Ljusnarsberg	87.4	2.4	4,131	62.7	17.1	7.4	2.6	7.8	2.2	0.1	2,914	1,123	70.5	27.2	1,791
Nora	86.9	2.8	4,865	52.4	21.5	17.3	6.5	5.4	2.9	0.1	2,809	1,909	57.7	39.2	900
Örebro	87.7	34.9	60,688	49.0	20.5	13.0	7.8	3.0	1.9	0.7	31,556	27,550	52.0	45.4	4,006
Postal vote		14.3	24,932	42.4	15.6	20.8	14.4	3.2	2.9	0.6	11,371	12,685	45.6	50.9	1,314
Total	88.4	3.5	174,031	51.1	20.1	14.3	7.6	4.3	2.2	0.4	96,531	72,985	55.4	41.9	23,546
Source:SCB

=== Östergötland ===
Location	Turnout	Share	Votes	S	C	FP	M	VPK	KDS	Other	L-vote	R-vote	Left	Right	Margin
Location	%	%		%	%	%	%	%	%	%			%	%	
Aska	87.7	0.6	1,447	41.3	36.1	9.3	8.5	3.0	1.7	0.0	642	780	44.4	53.9	138
Boxholm	89.7	1.6	3,731	53.6	25.6	5.7	6.0	7.0	2.1	0.0	2,259	1,391	60.5	37.3	868
Finspång	91.6	5.4	13,058	61.3	16.8	9.8	6.2	3.4	2.4	0.1	8,449	4,276	64.7	32.7	4,173
Linköping	89.8	24.2	58,167	48.0	18.8	15.7	10.3	4.3	2.7	0.1	30,435	26,076	52.3	44.8	4,359
Mjölby	88.5	5.7	13,655	50.4	25.6	9.9	8.0	3.5	2.6	0.1	7,354	5,941	53.9	43.5	1,413
Motala	89.1	8.6	20,756	58.1	15.3	13.2	6.9	4.4	1.8	0.2	12,971	7,355	62.5	35.4	5,616
Norra Kinda	90.6	0.7	1,776	35.6	36.3	10.6	11.0	1.4	5.0	0.0	657	1,030	37.0	58.0	373
Norrköping	87.4	24.8	59,507	55.8	13.6	13.3	10.9	4.0	1.7	0.7	35,601	22,450	59.8	37.7	13,151
Stegeborg	86.6	0.5	1,099	25.5	51.0	7.7	11.4	1.5	2.9	0.0	296	771	26.9	70.2	475
Söderköping	90.5	1.8	4,286	42.5	29.4	10.1	13.3	1.5	3.0	0.2	1,885	2,265	44.0	52.8	380
Södra Kinda	89.8	0.5	1,295	25.7	56.4	3.5	8.3	1.0	5.1	0.0	346	883	26.7	68.2	537
Tjällmo	93.1	0.3	817	46.0	34.4	5.3	9.4	1.0	3.9	0.0	384	401	47.0	49.1	17
Vadstena	90.0	1.6	3,787	52.7	22.4	10.9	9.2	1.9	2.9	0.1	2,068	1,608	54.6	42.5	460
Valdemarsvik	90.8	2.3	5,444	49.0	29.6	7.3	9.2	3.1	1.8	0.1	2,835	2,506	52.1	46.0	329
Vikbolandet	91.0	1.4	3,355	28.7	44.6	7.1	13.8	1.8	4.1	0.0	1,022	2,197	30.5	65.5	1,175
Västra Kinda	89.2	1.4	3,246	39.6	33.7	7.9	14.4	1.3	2.8	0.3	1,329	1,815	40.9	55.9	486
Ydre	90.1	1.1	2,679	27.0	40.4	15.8	9.4	2.0	5.4	0.0	775	1,758	28.9	65.6	983
Åtvidaberg	91.4	3.2	7,757	59.1	20.5	8.3	6.8	2.0	3.1	0.1	4,739	2,767	61.1	35.7	1,972
Ödeshög	88.3	1.5	3,609	39.9	34.9	10.0	9.4	1.8	3.9	0.0	1,506	1,961	41.7	54.3	455
Postal vote		12.7	30,485	36.1	15.3	19.7	22.5	2.9	2.8	0.6	11,884	17,553	39.0	57.6	5,669
Total	89.1	4.8	239,956	49.5	19.4	13.5	11.2	3.6	2.5	0.3	127,437	105,784	53.1	44.1	21,653
Source:SCB
