= Nordvärmlands FF =

Association football club in Sweden

- Full name: Nordvärmlands Fotbollförening
- Founded: 2004; 22 years ago
- Ground: Nyvallen; Ambjörby; Sweden
- Chairman: Bo Halvardsson
- Coach: Jonas Korpi
- League: Division 2 Norra Götaland
- 2022: Division 2 Norra Götaland, 7th
Home colours	Away colours

Nordvärmlands FF is a Swedish football club located in Ambjörby in Torsby Municipality, Värmland County.

== Background ==
Since their foundation Nordvärmlands FF has participated mainly in the middle and lower divisions of the Swedish football league system. The club currently plays in Division 2 Norra Götaland which is the fourth tier of Swedish football. They play their home matches at the Nyvallen in Ambjörby. Their first team manager is Jonas Korpi.

Nordvärmlands FF are affiliated to Värmlands Fotbollförbund.

== Recent history ==
In recent seasons Nordvärmlands FF have competed in the following divisions:
2022 – Division II, Norra Götaland
2021 – Division II, Norra Götaland
2020 – Division II, Norra Götaland
2019 – Division II, Norra Götaland
2018 – Division II, Norra Götaland
2017 – Division II, Norra Götaland
2016 – Division III, Västra Svealand
2015 – Division II, Norra Götaland
2014 – Division II, Norra Götaland
2013 – Division II, Norra Götaland
2012 – Division III, Västra Svealand
2011 – Division III, Västra Svealand
2010 – Division IV, Värmland
2009 – Division IV, Värmland
2008 – Division V, Värmland Norra
2007 – Division IV, Värmland
2006 – Division V, Värmland Norra

== Current squad ==
Note: Flags indicate national team as defined under FIFA eligibility rules; some limited exceptions apply. Players may hold more than one non-FIFA nationality.

No.	Pos.	Nation	Player
1	GK	SUI	Tyron Matuta Zecchin
3	DF	SRB	Nenad Vukoicic
6	DF	SWE	Joel Kyrksjö Beckman
7	MF	SWE	Albin Lekiqi
8	MF	SWE	Joel Gustavsson
9	FW	ESP	Hugo Puertas Garcia
10	MF	SWE	Govend Haidar
11	MF	SRB	Anastajsis Mordatenko
12	MF	USA	Nasser Abraham
13	DF	FRA	Jonathan Itela
14	FW	SWE	Dawood Behtio Yako
16	DF	ESP	Alejandro Guillen Cristobal
17	GK	CMR	Joseph Leke Asong
18	MF	FRA	Yanis Nejda
19	MF	POR	David Mendes
20	FW	SWE	Adam Wester
21	MF	TOG	Espoir Komi Nublasso
22	DF	ITA	Christian Frigerio
23	DF	SWE	John Feltsten

== Attendances ==
In recent seasons Nordvärmlands FF have had the following average attendances:

Season	Average attendance	Division / Section	Level
2008	Not available	Div 5 Värmland Norra	Tier 7
2009	222	Div 4 Värmland	Tier 6
2010	221	Div 4 Värmland	Tier 6
2011	338	Div 3 Västra Svealand	Tier 5
2012	317	Div 3 Västra Svealand	Tier 5
2013		Div 2 Norra Götaland	Tier 4
2014		Div 2 Norra Götaland	Tier 4
2015		Div 2 Norra Götaland	Tier 4
2016	248	Div 3 Västra Svealand	Tier 5

* Attendances are provided in the Publikliga sections of the Svenska Fotbollförbundet website.
