= Östmark =

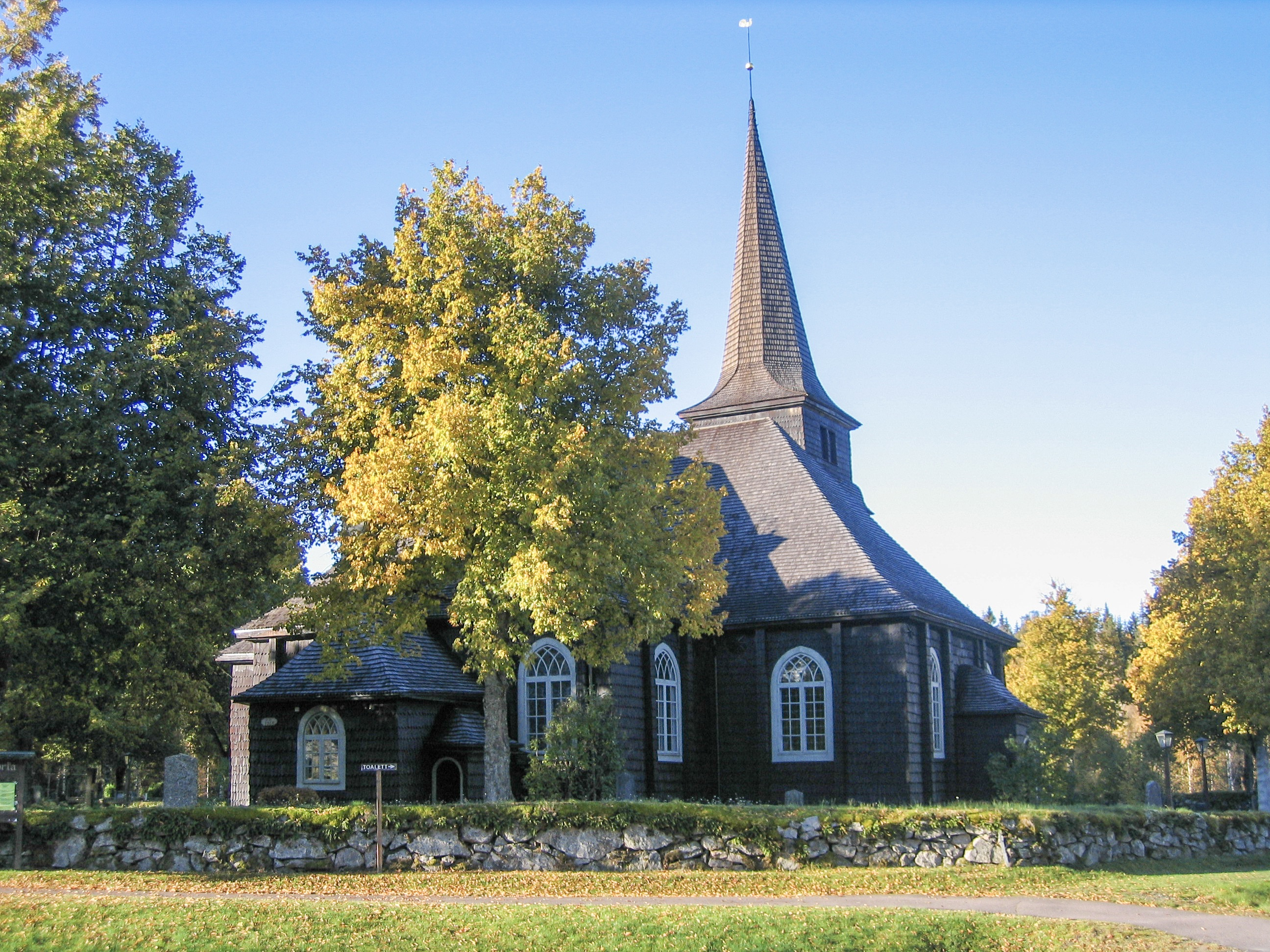
- Östmark church

- Location within Sweden
- Coordinates: 60°17′N 12°45′E
- Country: Sweden
- Province: Värmland
- County: Värmland County
- Municipality: Torsby Municipality

Area
  - Total: 1.05 km^{2} (0.41 sq mi)

Population (31 December 2010)
  - Total: 216
  - Density: 205/km^{2} (530/sq mi)
- Time zone: UTC+1 (CET)
  - Summer (DST): UTC+2 (CEST)
- Climate: Dfb

Östmark is a locality situated in Torsby Municipality, Värmland County, Sweden with 216 inhabitants in 2010.

== Climate ==
Östmark has a climate that in recent decades has leaned towards a humid continental climate (Dfb), that formerly was a mild subarctic type (Dfc). The highest recorded temperature is 33.1 °C (91.6 °F) on July 27, 2018 and the lowest is -34.0 °C (-29.2 °F) on February 9, 1966.

Climate data for Östmark (2002–2015 temp averages, 1961–1990 precipitation, extremes since 1943)
| Month | Jan | Feb | Mar | Apr | May | Jun | Jul | Aug | Sep | Oct | Nov | Dec | Year |
|---|---|---|---|---|---|---|---|---|---|---|---|---|---|
| Record high °C (°F) | 9.5 (49.1) | 10.3 (50.5) | 19.6 (67.3) | 24.4 (75.9) | 29.3 (84.7) | 31.5 (88.7) | 33.1 (91.6) | 32.5 (90.5) | 27.1 (80.8) | 19.3 (66.7) | 15.2 (59.4) | 11.2 (52.2) | 32.5 (90.5) |
| Mean daily maximum °C (°F) | −1.9 (28.6) | −0.3 (31.5) | 5.0 (41.0) | 11.2 (52.2) | 16.1 (61.0) | 20.2 (68.4) | 22.3 (72.1) | 20.7 (69.3) | 16.2 (61.2) | 8.6 (47.5) | 3.3 (37.9) | −1.0 (30.2) | 10.0 (50.0) |
| Daily mean °C (°F) | −5.3 (22.5) | −4.2 (24.4) | −0.4 (31.3) | 4.9 (40.8) | 9.7 (49.5) | 13.7 (56.7) | 16.4 (61.5) | 15.0 (59.0) | 10.5 (50.9) | 4.5 (40.1) | 0.3 (32.5) | −4.5 (23.9) | 5.0 (41.0) |
| Mean daily minimum °C (°F) | −8.6 (16.5) | −8.2 (17.2) | −5.8 (21.6) | −1.4 (29.5) | 3.4 (38.1) | 7.2 (45.0) | 10.5 (50.9) | 9.2 (48.6) | 4.8 (40.6) | 0.4 (32.7) | −2.6 (27.3) | −7.9 (17.8) | 0.0 (32.0) |
| Record low °C (°F) | −33.9 (−29.0) | −34.0 (−29.2) | −29.6 (−21.3) | −18.3 (−0.9) | −7.8 (18.0) | −3.2 (26.2) | −0.8 (30.6) | −1.8 (28.8) | −7.1 (19.2) | −17.0 (1.4) | −22.2 (−8.0) | −30.2 (−22.4) | −34.0 (−29.2) |
| Average precipitation mm (inches) | 57.8 (2.28) | 43.1 (1.70) | 51.3 (2.02) | 53.2 (2.09) | 61.4 (2.42) | 82.4 (3.24) | 89.2 (3.51) | 85.8 (3.38) | 92.9 (3.66) | 92.7 (3.65) | 89.2 (3.51) | 66.6 (2.62) | 865.7 (34.08) |
Source 1: SMHI Precipitation normals 1961–1990
Source 2: SMHI average data 2002–2015
