= Oleby =

- Location within Sweden
- Coordinates: 60°08′N 13°10′E
- Country: Sweden
- Province: Värmland
- County: Värmland County
- Municipality: Torsby Municipality

Area
  - Total: 1.11 km^{2} (0.43 sq mi)

Population (31 December 2010)
  - Total: 353
  - Density: 319/km^{2} (830/sq mi)
- Time zone: UTC+1 (CET)
  - Summer (DST): UTC+2 (CEST)
- Climate: Dfb

Oleby is a locality situated in Torsby Municipality, Värmland County, Sweden with 353 inhabitants in 2010.
