= Ambjörby =

- Location within Sweden
- Coordinates: 60°30′N 13°10′E
- Country: Sweden
- Province: Värmland
- County: Värmland County
- Municipality: Torsby Municipality

Area
  - Total: 1.48 km^{2} (0.57 sq mi)

Population (31 December 2010)
  - Total: 227
  - Density: 153/km^{2} (400/sq mi)
- Time zone: UTC+1 (CET)
  - Summer (DST): UTC+2 (CEST)
- Climate: Dfc

Ambjörby is a locality situated in Torsby Municipality, Värmland County, Sweden with 227 inhabitants in 2010.

== Sports ==
The following sports clubs are located in Ambjörby:

- Nordvärmland FF
