= Munkedal Municipality =

Munkedal Municipality Munkedals kommun
- Municipality
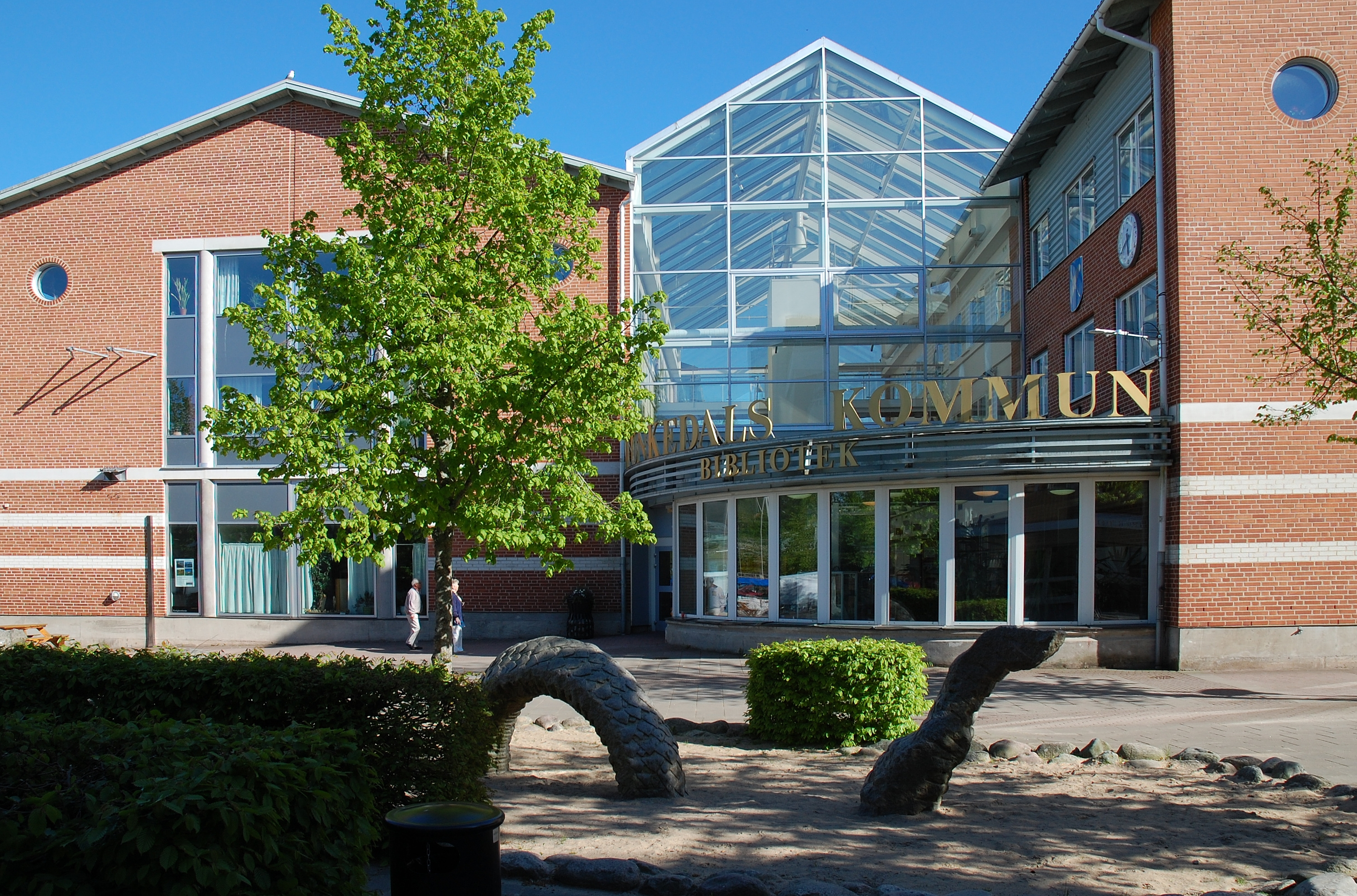
- Munkedal town hall

- Coat of arms

- Coordinates: 58°29′N 11°41′E
- Country: Sweden
- County: Västra Götaland County
- Seat: Munkedal

Area
  - Total: 675.01 km^{2} (260.62 sq mi)
  - Land: 634.01 km^{2} (244.79 sq mi)
  - Water: 41 km^{2} (16 sq mi)
- Area as of 1 January 2014.

Population (30 June 2025)
  - Total: 10,280
  - Density: 16.21/km^{2} (41.99/sq mi)
- Time zone: UTC+1 (CET)
  - Summer (DST): UTC+2 (CEST)
- ISO 3166 code: SE
- Province: Bohuslän and Dalsland
- Municipal code: 1430
- Website: www.munkedal.se

Munkedal Municipality (Swedish: Munkedals kommun) is a municipality in Västra Götaland County in western Sweden. Its seat is located in the town of Munkedal.

The nationwide municipal reform of 1952 saw the creation of Munkedal, Svarteborg, Sörbygden and Ödeborg as larger rural municipalities. As early as 1967 Ödeborg was dissolved and parts of it added to Munkedal. Finally, in 1974 Svarteborg and Sörbygden were merged into Munkedal forming the present unit.

== Etymology ==
The municipality is named after the old farm Munkedal. This farm was owned by the monks at Dragsmark Abbey. The last element is dal 'dale, valley'.

== Geography ==
Munkedal is located 110 km north of Gothenburg. The geography is a varied terrain, covered with part forests, part mountains, part plains and part lakes and streams.

=== Localities ===
Inhabitants 2005:

- Munkedal 3,838 (seat)
- Dingle 889
- Hällevadsholm 723
- Hedekas 358

=== Subdivisions ===
Munkedal has 8 parishes, within the Diocese of Gothenburg, the sub divisioning used by the Church of Sweden. Their inhabitants 1 January 2005 and changes since 1 January 2004 are:

- Foss 5,020 -52
- Svarteborg 2,683 +12
- Krokstad 1,043 +-0
- Håby 468 +12
- Hede 495 +10
- Bärfendal 248 +8
- Valbo Ryr 262 -9
- Sanne 186 -10

== History ==
This area in western Sweden, by the Norwegian border, has been inhabited perhaps longer than any other in Sweden. Distinctives for Munkedal are some tools that have been dated to 8000 BC, found around 1900 at a farm named Herregårda. There is also a petroglyph area called Lökeberg på Tungenäset, dated to the Nordic Bronze Age.

In the medieval age, a monastery of Dragsmark was located within the current municipal borders. It subsequently led to the name Munkedal, and the names chosen for the municipality when it was established in 1974 with the reform. The coat of arms also portrait a medieval scroll and writing pen, characteristics for monks.

== Demographics ==
This is a demographic table based on Munkedal Municipality's electoral districts in the 2022 Swedish general election sourced from SVT's election platform, in turn taken from SCB official statistics.

Residents include everyone registered as living in the district, regardless of age or citizenship status. Valid voters indicate Swedish citizens above the age of 18 who therefore can vote in general elections. Left vote and right vote indicate the result between the two major blocs in said district in the 2022 general election. Employment indicates the share of people between the ages of 20 and 64 who are working taxpayers. Foreign background is defined as residents either born abroad or with two parents born outside of Sweden. Median income is the received monthly income through either employment, capital gains or social grants for the median adult above 20, also including pensioners in Swedish kronor. The section about college graduates indicates any degree accumulated after high school.

In total there were 10,571 residents, including 8,038 Swedish citizens of voting age. 40.3% voted for the left coalition and 58.2% for the right coalition. Indicators are in percentage points except population totals and income.

Location	Residents	Citizen adults	Left vote	Right vote	Employed	Swedish parents	Foreign heritage	Income SEK	Degree
Location			%	%					
Dingle-Bärfendal	1,403	1,111	43.2	55.0	77	86	14	22,656	21
Hällevadsholm-Svarteborg	1,512	1,173	36.2	61.5	80	89	11	24,402	22
Munkedal 1-S	1,661	1,288	40.3	58.6	83	88	12	25,984	32
Munkedal 2-C-V	2,406	1,756	48.1	50.4	72	74	26	21,329	26
Munkedal 3-N	2,099	1,557	42.8	56.4	83	90	10	26,835	30
Sörbygden	1,490	1,153	29.1	68.8	80	88	12	22,204	23
Source: SVT

== Notability ==
The Munkedal Railroad, a narrow gauge museum railroad, inaugurated in 1896. A railroad museum is also situated by it.

The area, troubled by battles between Norwegian and Swedish armies, has several defence structures that can be visited. In addition, there are many old churches from the medieval age of interest.
