= Sysslebäck =

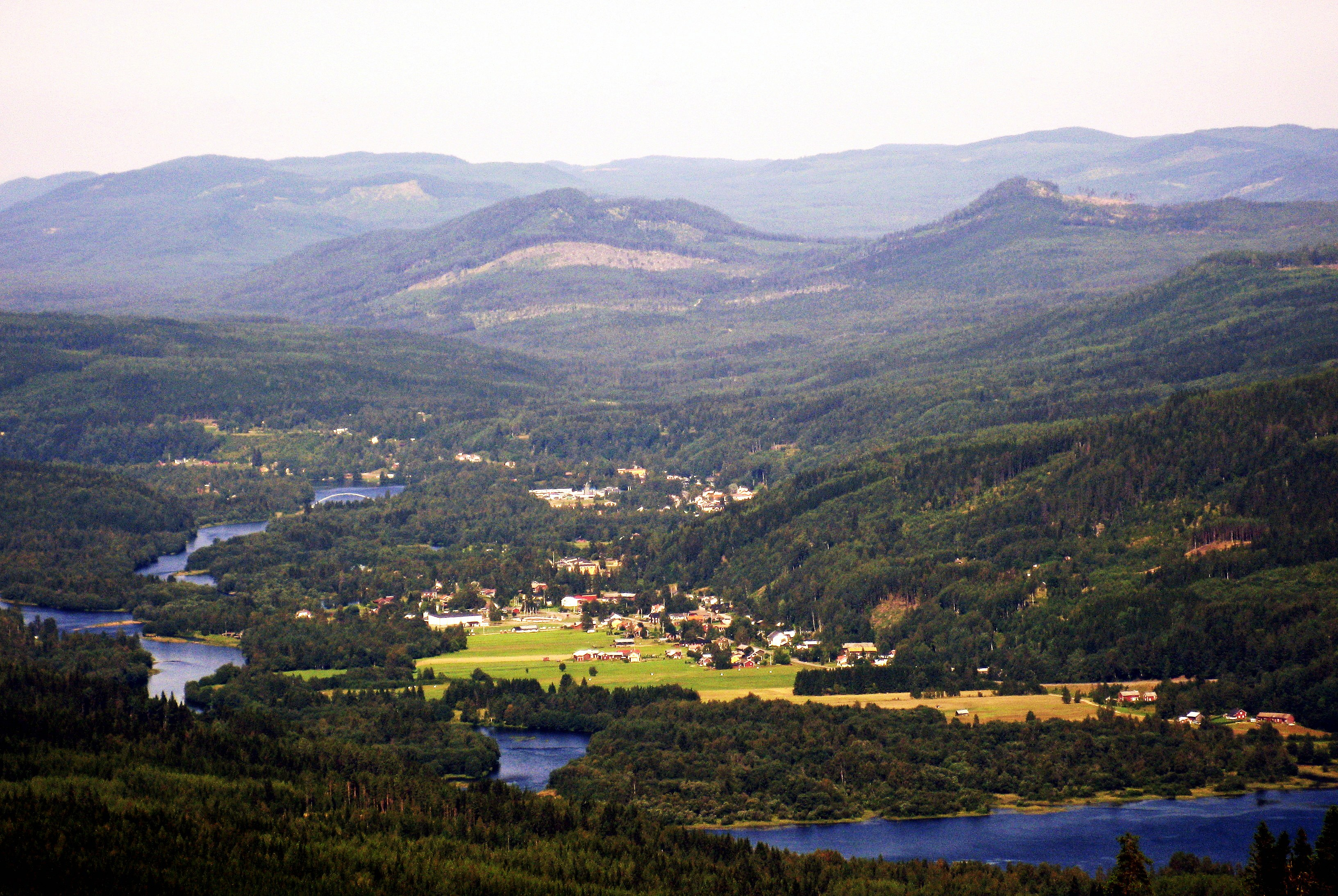
- Sysslebäck in October 2010

- Location within Sweden
- Coordinates: 60°45′N 12°52′E
- Country: Sweden
- Province: Värmland
- County: Värmland County
- Municipality: Torsby Municipality

Area
  - Total: 1.50 km^{2} (0.58 sq mi)

Population (31 December 2010)
  - Total: 527
  - Density: 351/km^{2} (910/sq mi)
- Time zone: UTC+1 (CET)
  - Summer (DST): UTC+2 (CEST)
- Climate: Dfc

Sysslebäck is a locality situated in Torsby Municipality, Värmland County, Sweden with 527 inhabitants in 2010.
