= Hedekas =

- Location within Västra Götaland Location within Sweden
- Coordinates: 58°39′N 11°46′E
- Country: Sweden
- Province: Bohuslän
- County: Västra Götaland County
- Municipality: Munkedal Municipality

Area
  - Total: 0.70 km^{2} (0.27 sq mi)

Population (31 December 2010)
  - Total: 370
  - Density: 525/km^{2} (1,360/sq mi)
- Time zone: UTC+1 (CET)
  - Summer (DST): UTC+2 (CEST)

Hedekas is a locality situated in Munkedal Municipality, Västra Götaland County, Sweden with 370 inhabitants in 2010.

== Links ==
Old pics from Hedekas
