= Stöllet =

- Location within Sweden
- Coordinates: 60°26′N 13°16′E
- Country: Sweden
- Province: Värmland
- County: Värmland County
- Municipality: Torsby Municipality

Area
  - Total: 0.81 km^{2} (0.31 sq mi)

Population (31 December 2010)
  - Total: 245
  - Density: 304/km^{2} (790/sq mi)
- Time zone: UTC+1 (CET)
  - Summer (DST): UTC+2 (CEST)
- Climate: Dfc

Stöllet (Swedish pronunciation: [ˈstœ̌lːɛt]) is a locality situated in Torsby Municipality, Värmland County, Sweden with 245 inhabitants in 2010.
