= Dingle, Sweden =

Dingle
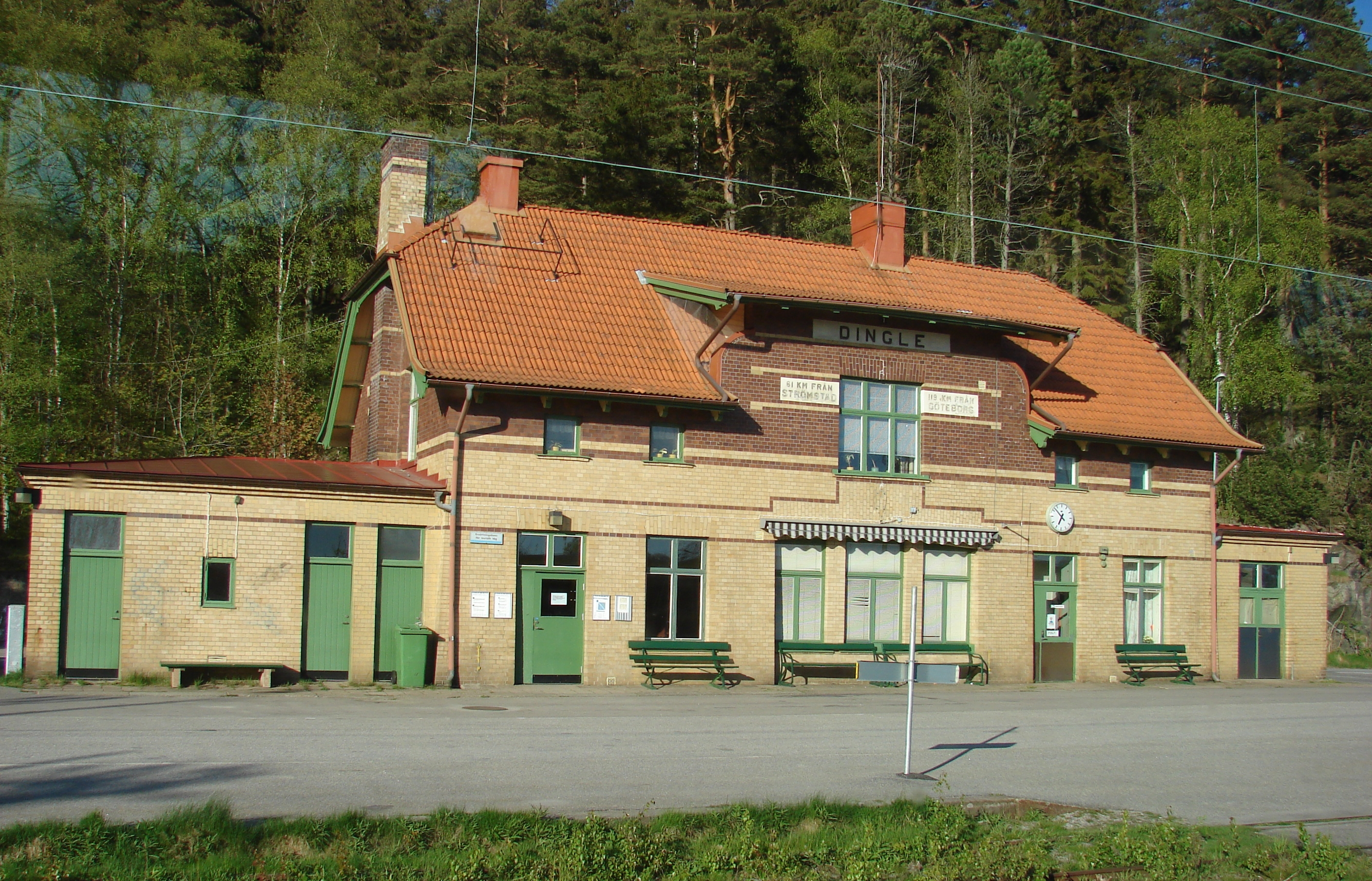
- Dingle Station

- Location within Västra Götaland Location within Sweden
- Coordinates: 58°32′N 11°34′E
- Country: Sweden
- Province: Bohuslän
- County: Västra Götaland County
- Municipality: Munkedal Municipality

Area
  - Total: 1.07 km^{2} (0.41 sq mi)

Population (31 December 2010)
  - Total: 900
  - Density: 840/km^{2} (2,200/sq mi)
- Time zone: UTC+1 (CET)
  - Summer (DST): UTC+2 (CEST)
- Climate: Cfb

Dingle is a locality situated in Munkedal Municipality, Västra Götaland County, Sweden with 900 inhabitants in 2010.
