= Torsby Municipality =

Torsby Municipality Torsby kommun
- Municipality
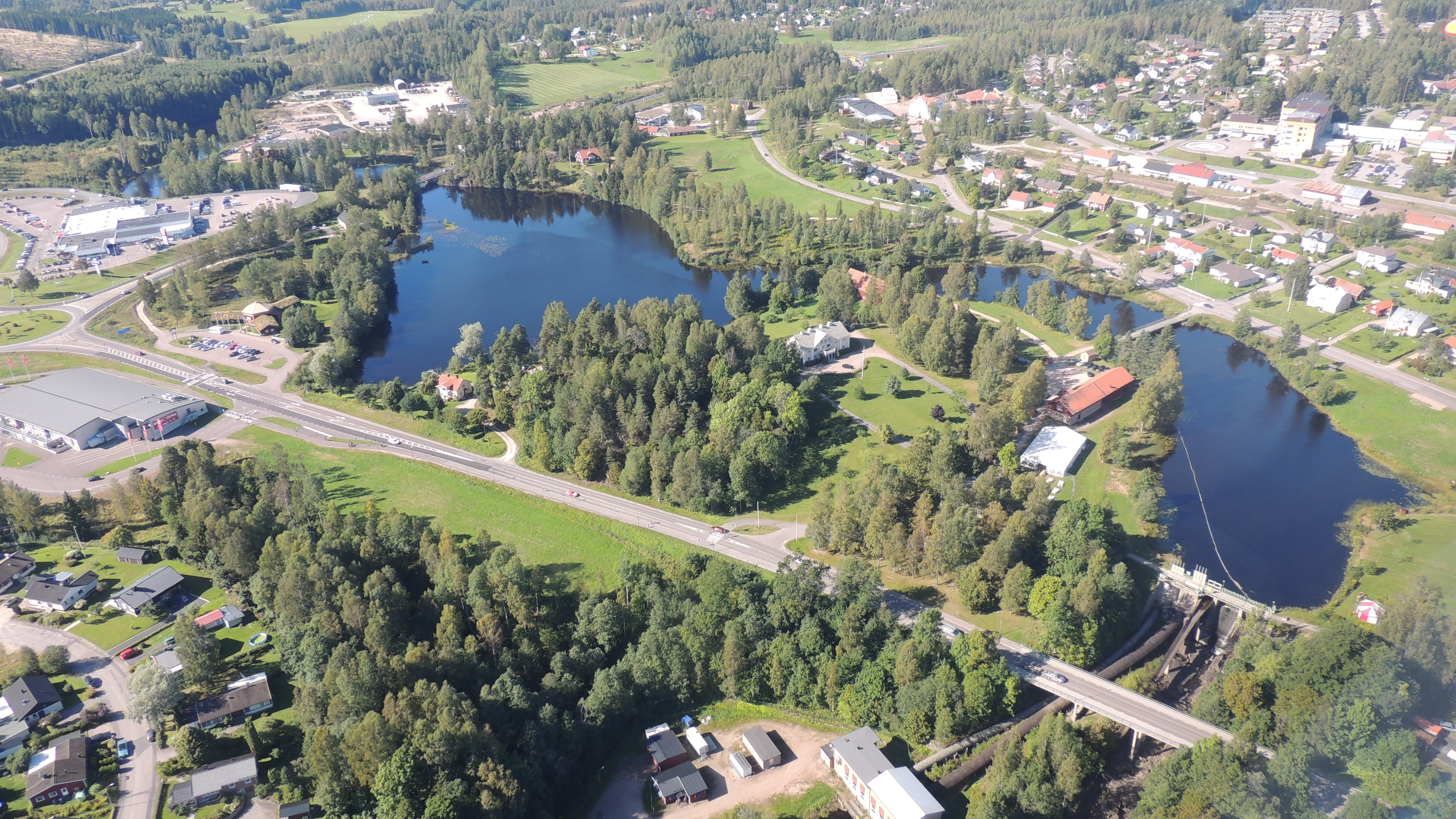

- Coat of arms

- Coordinates: 60°08′N 13°00′E
- Country: Sweden
- County: Värmland County
- Seat: Torsby

Area
  - Total: 4,357.44 km^{2} (1,682.42 sq mi)
  - Land: 4,162.19 km^{2} (1,607.03 sq mi)
  - Water: 195.25 km^{2} (75.39 sq mi)
- Area as of 1 January 2014.

Population (30 June 2025)
  - Total: 11,289
  - Density: 2.7123/km^{2} (7.0248/sq mi)
- Time zone: UTC+1 (CET)
  - Summer (DST): UTC+2 (CEST)
- ISO 3166 code: SE
- Province: Värmland
- Municipal code: 1737
- Website: www.torsby.se

Torsby Municipality (Swedish: Torsby kommun) is a municipality in Värmland County in west central Sweden, bordering Norway. Its seat is located in the town of Torsby.

The name Torsby means Thor's village.

The present municipality consists of eight original local government entities (as of 1863): Dalby, Fryksände, Lekvattnet, Norra Finnskoga, Norra Ny, Nyskoga, Södra Finnskoga, Vitsand and Östmark. In 1952 they were grouped into four larger units and in 1974 they were all united.

There is much Finnish heritage in Torsby Municipality.

== Localities ==
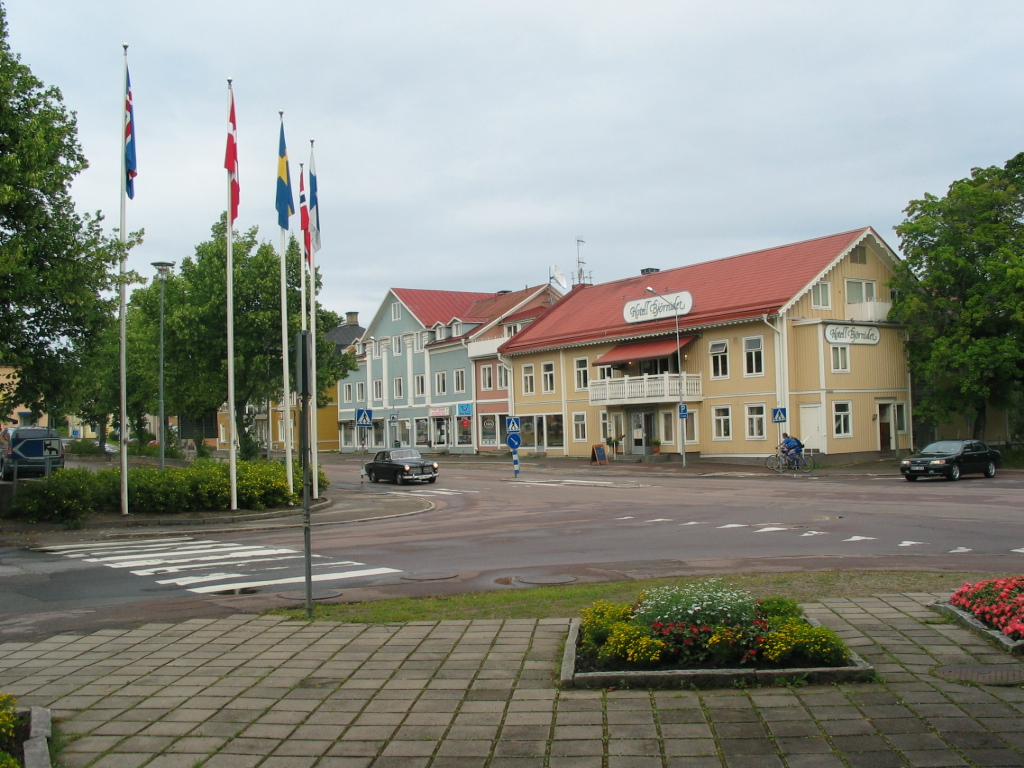
Torsby

Population centers in the municipality include:

- Ambjörby
- Oleby
- Östmark
- Stöllet
- Sysslebäck
- Torsby (seat)

== Transportation ==
Torsby is the end station on the Fryksdal branchline from Karlstad via Kil. There is a small airport with scheduled flights to Stockholm, whilst the nearest international airport is Gardermoen in Norway. The 1,690-kilometre-long (1,050 mi) road, E45, passes through the municipality.

== Sport ==
Sven-Göran Eriksson and Marcus Berg have their roots in Torsby.

The municipality has a number of skiing centres for both alpine skiing (Hovfjället and Branäs) and cross-country skiing (Mattila and Långberget). A cross-country ski tunnel, which is also the world's longest, opened on June 16, 2006.

Stjerneskolan, a senior high school, specializes in cross-country skiing and biathlon. The most famous former pupil is Gunde Svan. Carl Johan Bergman, who was born in Ekshärad, also studied there for a year.

== Demographics ==
This is a demographic table based on Torsby Municipality's electoral districts in the 2022 Swedish general election sourced from SVT's election platform, in turn taken from SCB official statistics.

In total there were 11,448 inhabitants, with 8,766 Swedish citizens of voting age. 44.9% voted for the left coalition and 53.9% for the right coalition. Indicators are in percentage points except population totals and income.

Location	Residents	Citizen adults	Left vote	Right vote	Employed	Swedish parents	Foreign heritage	Income SEK	Degree
Location			%	%					
Likenäs	634	521	52.5	45.3	80	93	7	23,432	24
Oleby	1,288	981	42.8	56.6	85	92	8	27,395	31
Stöllet	908	694	41.9	56.5	69	82	18	19,017	20
Svenneby	1,823	1,377	44.5	54.8	77	86	14	24,864	26
Sysslebäck	1,025	789	47.0	51.9	72	78	22	21,290	16
Torsby N	2,320	1,706	47.4	51.3	79	81	19	24,329	27
Torsby S	1,597	1,270	47.8	50.9	79	86	14	23,269	30
Vitsand	769	598	39.0	59.7	74	84	16	21,785	23
Östmark	1,084	830	40.5	58.6	74	87	13	22,037	22
Source: SVT

== Elections ==
=== Riksdag ===
These are the local results of the Riksdag elections since the 1972 municipality reform. The results of the Sweden Democrats were not published by SCB between 1988 and 1998 at a municipal level to the party's small nationwide size at the time. "Votes" denotes valid votes, whereas "Turnout" denotes also blank and invalid votes.

Year	Turnout	Votes	V	S	MP	C	L	KD	M	SD	ND
1973	90.6	11,724	8.9	45.6	0.0	28.6	5.5	0.8	9.7	0.0	0.0
1976	90.7	11,376	7.7	44.9	0.0	28.5	6.2	0.7	11.7	0.0	0.0
1979	90.9	11,169	8.0	47.9	0.0	24.5	4.9	0.6	13.6	0.0	0.0
1982	91.0	11,096	7.1	50.6	1.5	20.4	3.3	0.9	16.2	0.0	0.0
1985	88.0	10,545	7.0	49.7	1.3	17.6	7.8	0.0	16.5	0.0	0.0
1988	84.8	9,945	7.0	50.6	4.2	16.8	6.5	1.5	13.3	0.0	0.0
1991	84.6	9,811	6.3	45.5	2.3	14.7	4.7	4.2	17.0	0.0	5.2
1994	86.4	9,873	8.6	52.1	3.6	11.3	2.9	2.3	17.8	0.0	0.7
1998	80.5	8,798	17.2	42.1	3.3	8.4	2.1	6.7	19.4	0.0	0.0
2002	76.6	7,975	11.6	43.6	2.8	12.6	5.9	5.4	15.6	1.2	0.0
2006	78.5	7,842	8.3	44.7	2.5	11.7	3.2	3.9	21.3	2.9	0.0
2010	79.8	7,766	7.2	44.3	2.8	8.8	3.5	3.1	24.3	4.2	0.0
2014	81.3	7,599	5.8	43.5	2.7	8.9	2.5	2.8	17.3	14.4	0.0
2018	83.7	7,509	6.5	35.5	1.9	11.2	3.1	5.2	13.9	21.4	0.0

Blocs

This lists the relative strength of the socialist and centre-right blocs since 1973, but parties not elected to the Riksdag are inserted as "other", including the Sweden Democrats results from 1988 to 2006, but also the Christian Democrats pre-1991 and the Greens in 1982, 1985 and 1991. The sources are identical to the table above. The coalition or government mandate marked in bold formed the government after the election. New Democracy got elected in 1991 but are still listed as "other" due to the short lifespan of the party.

Year	Turnout	Votes	Left	Right	SD	Other	Elected
1973	90.6	11,724	**54.5**	43.8	0.0	1.7	98.3
1976	90.7	11,376	52.6	**46.4**	0.0	1.0	99.0
1979	90.9	11,169	55.9	**43.0**	0.0	1.1	98.9
1982	91.0	11,096	**57.7**	39.9	0.0	2.4	97.6
1985	88.0	10,545	**56.7**	41.9	0.0	1.4	98.6
1988	84.8	9,945	**61.8**	36.6	0.0	1.6	98.4
1991	84.6	9,811	51.8	**40.6**	0.0	7.8	97.6
1994	86.4	9,873	**64.3**	34.3	0.0	1.4	98.6
1998	80.5	8,798	**62.6**	36.6	0.0	0.8	99.2
2002	76.6	7,975	**58.0**	39.5	0.0	2.5	97.5
2006	78.5	7,842	55.5	**40.1**	0.0	4.4	95.6
2010	79.8	7,766	54.3	**39.7**	4.2	1.8	98.2
2014	81.3	7,599	**52.0**	31.5	14.4	2.1	97.9
2018	83.7	7,509	**43.9**	33.4	21.4	1.3	98.7
