= Edwin Eugene Aldrin Sr. =

United States Army officer and aviator

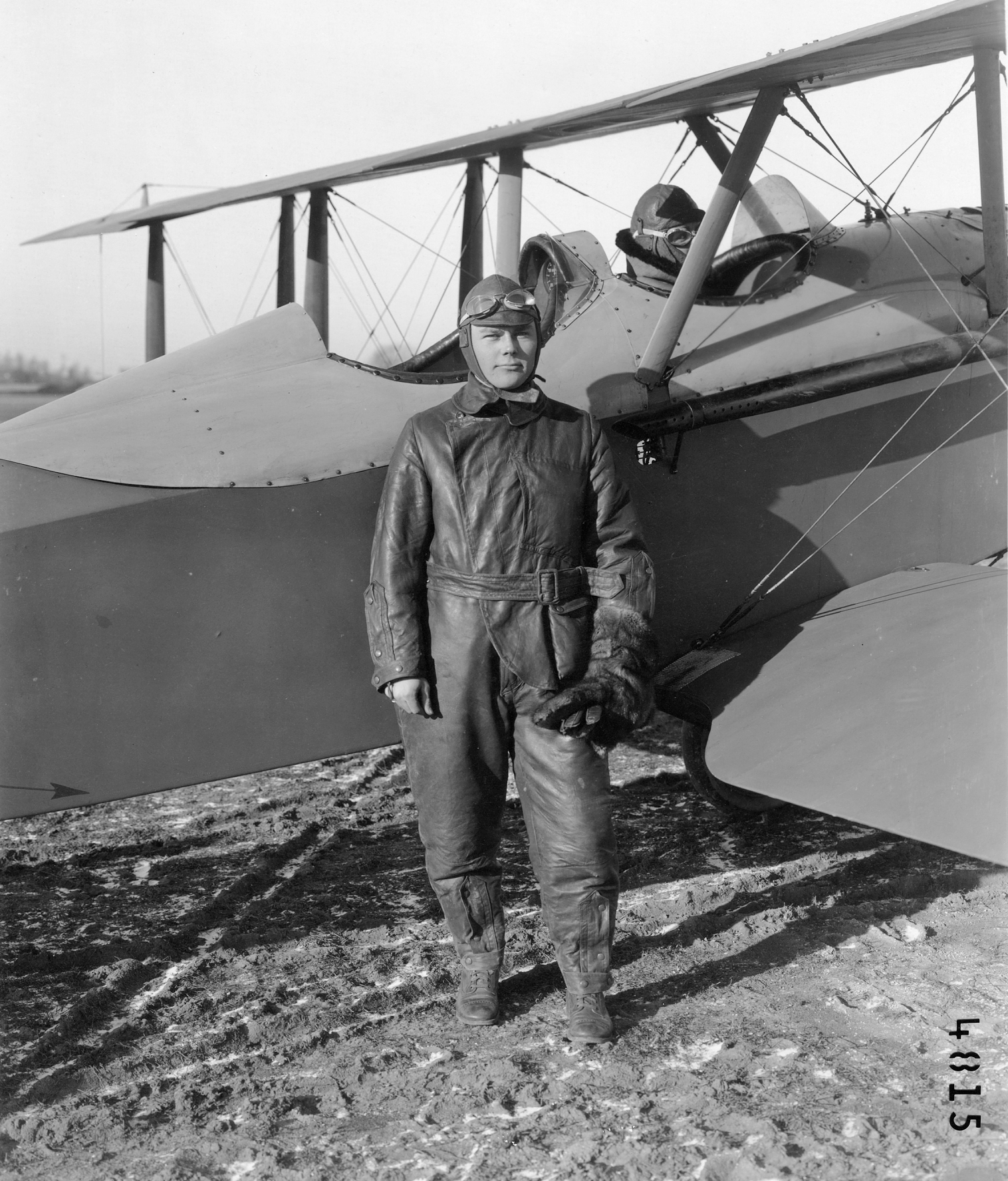
- Lieutenant Edwin Eugene Aldrin Sr., in flying clothes, standing by the cockpit of an unidentified aircraft; probably McCook Field, Ohio, 18 November 1919
- Born: 12 April 1896; Worcester, Massachusetts, U.S.
- Died: 28 December 1974 (aged 78); San Francisco, California, U.S.
- Burial place: Arlington National Cemetery
- Relatives: Buzz Aldrin (son)
- Military career
- Allegiance: United States of America
- Branch: United States Army Air Corps; United States Air Force
- Service years: 1917–1956
- Rank: Colonel
- Nickname: Gene
- Conflicts: World War I; World War II

Edwin Eugene "Gene" Aldrin Sr. (12 April 1896 – 28 December 1974) was an aviator and officer in the United States Army during World War I and World War II. He was assistant commandant of the Army's first test pilot school at McCook Field, Ohio, from 1919 to 1922, and founded the engineering school there that later became the Air Force Institute of Technology (AFIT) at Wright-Patterson AFB. The Edwin E. Aldrin Sr. Award is presented to an AFIT graduate for leadership and accomplishing AFIT's educational objectives in an outstanding manner. He was the father of astronaut Buzz Aldrin.

== Early life ==
Edwin Eugene (Gene) Aldrin Sr., was born in Worcester, Massachusetts, on 12 April 1896. His parents were both Swedish: his father, Karl Johan Aldrin (1866–1932), was a smith born in Stjärnsfors in Norra Råda in Sweden. His mother, Anna Nilsdotter (1858–1916), was born in nearby Hara in Ekshärad, but the family had emigrated to Worcester in 1892. The surname Aldrin was adopted by Aldrin Sr.'s great-great-great-grandfather Göran Andersson Aldrin (1709–1772). Aldrin Sr. was educated at Clark University, from which he graduated in 1916, and at Worcester Polytechnic Institute, from which he graduated the following year. At Clark he studied rocketry under Robert H. Goddard.

== World War I ==
On 16 November 1917, with the United States at war during World War I, he was commissioned in the United States Army as a second lieutenant in the Coast Artillery Corps. After training at the Coast Artillery School at Fort Monroe, Virginia, he was posted to the 11th Coast Artillery Company at Fort McKinley, Maine, in April 1918, and then to the 72nd Coast Artillery Company at Fort Preble, Maine, in May 1918.

In June 1918, Aldrin went to the School of Aeronautical Engineering at the Massachusetts Institute of Technology (MIT), where he was awarded an M.S. degree in aeronautical engineering in 1918, writing his thesis on an "Investigation of behavior of electrically heated wires with varying inclination to wind stream as applied to anemometer development" and the "Relationship of telephone transmitter resistance with diaphragm displacement – particularly to ascertain applicability as indicator for internal combustion engines", under the supervision of Arthur E. Kennelly.

== Between the wars ==
Aldrin completed flight training in February 1919, and was transferred to the United States Army Air Service on 1 July 1920. He was assistant commandant of the Army's first test pilot school at McCook Field, Ohio, from 1919 to 1922. On 22 March 1924, he married Marion G. Moon, whom he had met in the Philippines while serving as aide-de-camp to Billy Mitchell. He knew aviation pioneer Orville Wright, and Jimmy Doolittle was an occasional visitor to his house. He earned a Sc.D. in aeronautical engineering from MIT in 1928, writing a thesis on "Dynamical analysis of the spinning of airplanes" under the supervision of William G. Brown.

Now a captain, Aldrin resigned his commission in the Air Corps on 12 November 1928. On 15 February 1929, he became a major in the United States Army Air Corps Reserve. He briefly became a stockbroker, but sold all his stocks in August 1929, just two months before the Wall Street crash of 1929 in order to buy a grand three-storey, seven bedroom house in Montclair, New Jersey. He became an executive at Standard Oil, where he contributed to books and papers on aerodynamics, metallurgy, airplane structures and aviation fuels. He was a passenger on the first transatlantic round trip of the dirigible Hindenburg. He resigned from Standard Oil in 1938, and became an independent aviation consultant. As an Army reservist, he served in the Air Corps Procurement Planning Office in New York City and at Fort Ethan Allen, Vermont, from September 1930 to August 1939.

== World War II ==
On 4 February 1942, with World War II raging, Aldrin was recalled to active duty as the Commanding Officer of Newark Airport, New Jersey. He then became the commander of the Sea Search Attack Section of the Eighth Air Force in England in May 1942. In October he moved to Washington, D.C., as the Civilian Technical Service officer. In January 1943 he became the Sea Search Attack Unit Liaison Officer with Headquarters United States Army Air Forces, a position he retained until July 1944, when he went to Wright Field, Ohio, as a Design and Development Officer with the 4020th Army Air Force Base Unit. He served there as a project engineer on experimental production aircraft until January 1945, and then as Chief of the Operational Aids Branch with the 4020th Army Air Force Base Unit until November 1945.

== Later life ==
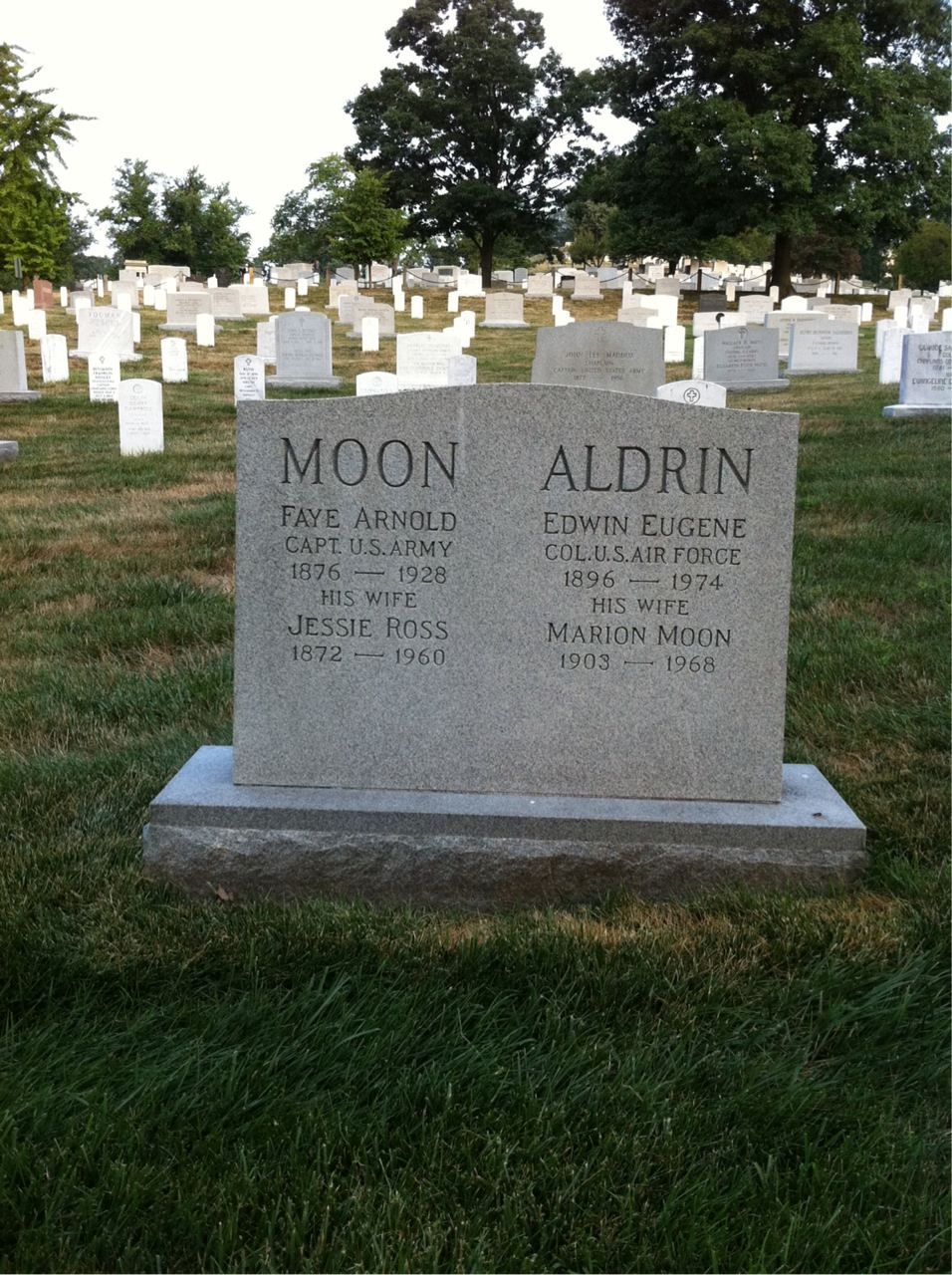
Grave at Arlington National Cemetery

Aldrin left active duty on 21 June 1946, but remained a reservist until he retired from the Air Force Reserve with the rank of colonel on 1 May 1956. He later became a consultant to the crewed space flight safety director of NASA.

Aldrin died in San Francisco, California, on 28 December 1974, while he was visiting his daughter there, and is buried at Arlington National Cemetery. He was survived by his sister, two daughters, and son, Buzz Aldrin. His wife Marion suffered from depression and committed suicide in 1968.

He is commemorated by the Edwin E. Aldrin Sr. Award, which is presented to an Air Force Institute of Technology (AFIT) graduate who displays leadership and accomplished AFIT's educational objectives in an outstanding manner.
