= Stefan Erkgärds =

Swedish ice hockey player (born 1985)

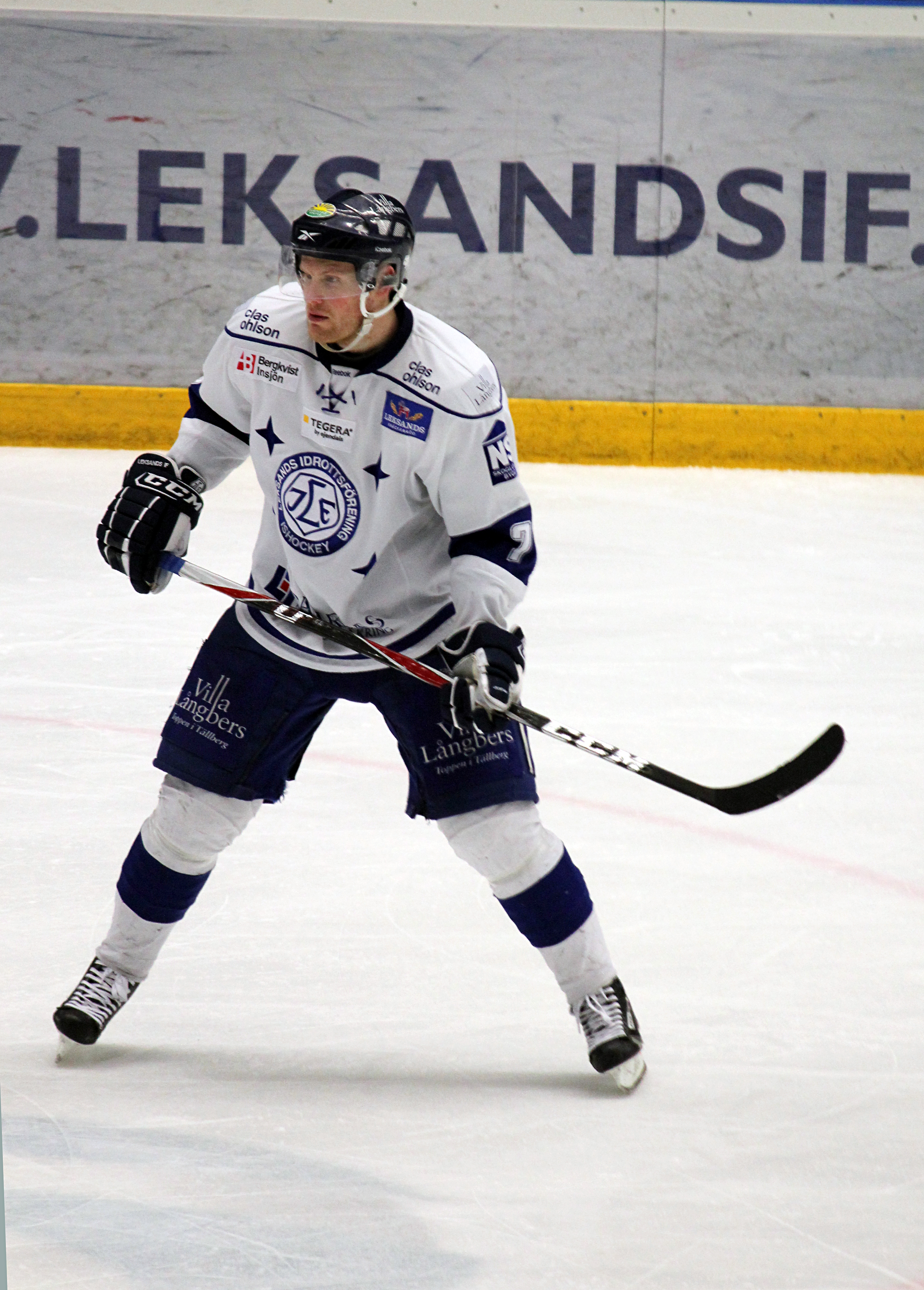
- Stefan Erkgärds for Leksands IF against Västerås IK 29 January 2011.
- Born: March 23, 1985 (age 40) Hagfors, SWE
- Height: 6 ft 0 in (183 cm)
- Weight: 185 lb (84 kg; 13 st 3 lb)
- Position: Defence
- Shoots: Left
- Rögle BK team Former teams: Rögle BK; Färjestads BK
- Playing career: 2002–present

Stefan Erkgärds (born March 23, 1985, in Hagfors, Sweden) is a Swedish professional ice hockey defenceman, from 2007-2010 with Rögle BK in the Swedish Elitserien. He is the older brother of professional ice hockey player Johan Erkgärds.

== Awards ==
- Elitserien Silver Medal in 2005.
- Swedish Champion with Färjestads BK in 2006.

== Career statistics ==
			Regular season					Playoffs
Season	Team	League	GP	G	A	Pts	PIM	GP	G	A	Pts	PIM
2002–03	Bofors IK	Swe-2	1	0	0	0	0	--	--	--	--	--
2003–04	Bofors IK	Swe-2	42	1	1	2	12	5	0	0	0	0
2004–05	Bofors IK	Swe-2	33	0	2	2	14	--	--	--	--	--
2004–05	Färjestads BK	SEL	7	0	0	0	0	11	0	0	0	0
2005–06	Bofors IK	Swe-2	19	1	3	4	37	--	--	--	--	--
2005–06	Färjestads BK	SEL	20	0	0	0	2	1	0	0	0	0
2006–07	Färjestads BK	SEL	42	2	2	4	22	5	0	0	0	0
2007–08	Färjestads BK	SEL	2	0	0	0	4	--	--	--	--	--
2007–08	Rögle BK	Swe-2	40	3	15	18	38	9	0	7	7	4
SEL totals			69	2	2	4	24	17	0	0	0	0

Statistics as of April 29, 2008.
