= Dyvelsten =

- Location within Sweden
- Coordinates: 59°30′N 13°26′E
- Country: Sweden
- Province: Värmland
- County: Värmland County
- Municipality: Forshaga Municipality

Area
  - Total: 0.44 km^{2} (0.17 sq mi)

Population (31 December 2010)
  - Total: 219
  - Density: 499/km^{2} (1,290/sq mi)
- Time zone: UTC+1 (CET)
  - Summer (DST): UTC+2 (CEST)

Dyvelsten is a locality situated in Forshaga Municipality, Värmland County, Sweden with 219 inhabitants in 2010.
