= Hagfors =

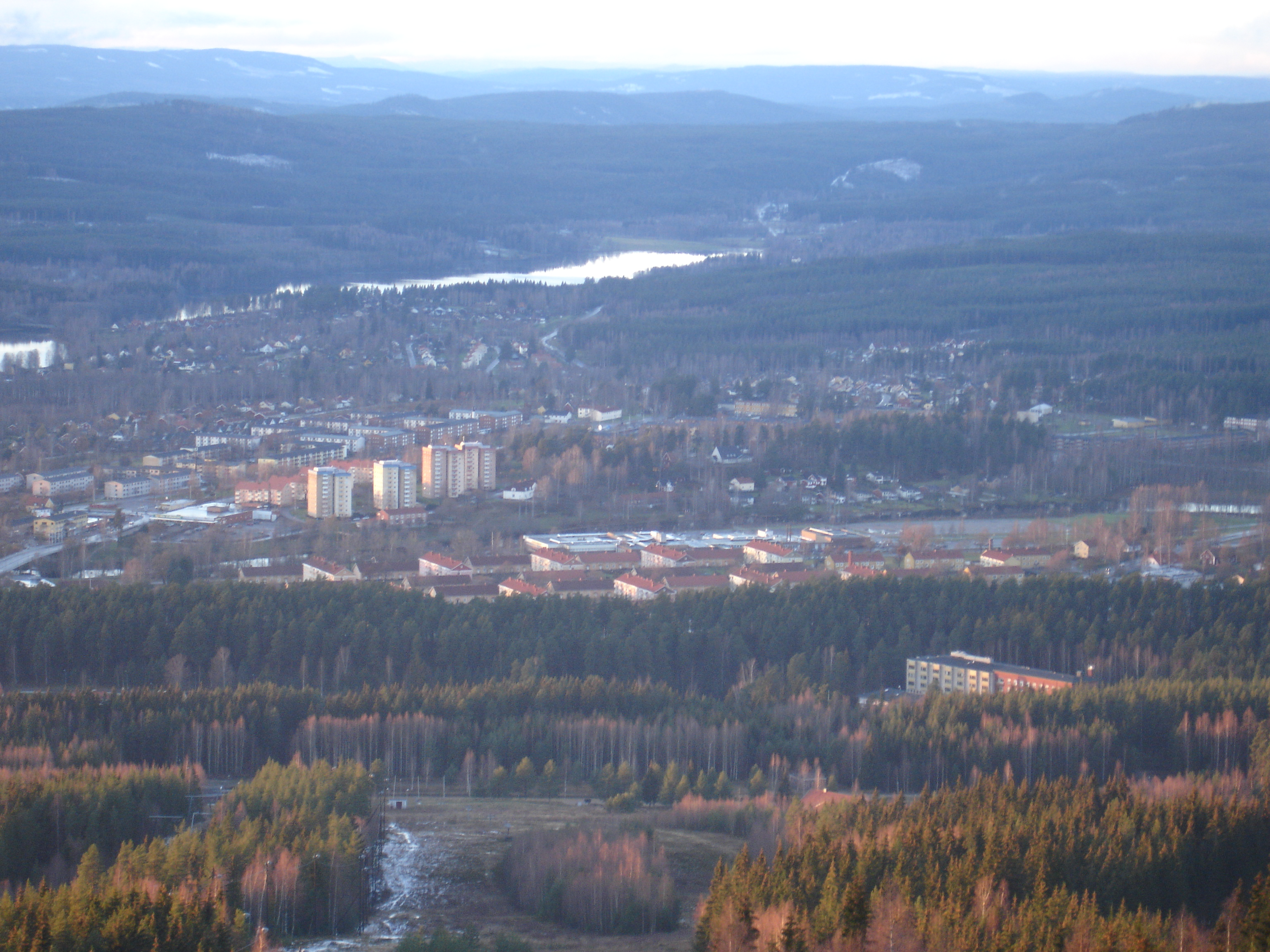
- Aerial view of Hagfors in 2006

- Location within Sweden
- Coordinates: 60°02′N 13°39′E
- Country: Sweden
- Province: Värmland
- County: Värmland County
- Municipality: Hagfors Municipality

Area
  - Total: 6.13 km^{2} (2.37 sq mi)

Population (31 December 2010)
  - Total: 12,125
  - Density: 840/km^{2} (2,200/sq mi)
- Time zone: UTC+1 (CET)
  - Summer (DST): UTC+2 (CEST)
- Climate: Dfb

Hagfors is a locality and the seat of Hagfors Municipality, Värmland County, Sweden with 10,125 inhabitants in 2010.

Its history is traced to 1873, when it was decided to build two blast furnaces at the location.

The town of Hagfors used to play host to the Swedish Rally, a car rally, every February, which provided a significant annual economic windfall for the region.

Hagfors was one of the last places in Sweden to receive the formal title of a city, when it was detached from Norra Råda in 1950. The designated coat of arms was a tribute to the furnaces. At that time the town had 6,501 inhabitants. Today it is the seat of the much larger Hagfors Municipality, but is not an administrative entity of its own.

== Climate ==
The Hagfors area has a subarctic climate due to the area's cool nights. The official weather station is located in Gustavsfors, a rural locality 13 kilometres (8.1 mi) to the north at a similar altitude. The climate type is very unusual for subarctic climate since summer days are warm in combination with winter average highs being just below freezing with lows only being around −10 °C (14 °F). Cold extremes are frequent for such a southerly area, with an all-time low of −42 °C (−44 °F) being unique for a Swedish area just north of 60 degrees latitude. It being a subarctic climate is a result of the low September night temperatures. Given that Gustavsfors is located somewhat north and Hagfors being a little bit more urban, it is quite possible that the locality just reaches the continental threshold that would require 10 °C (50 °F) September mean temperatures. In terms of the official reference period of 1961-1990 however, the area is firmly subarctic.

Climate data for Gustavsfors (2002-2015 temp averages, 1961-1990 precipitation, extremes since 1917)
Month	Jan	Feb	Mar	Apr	May	Jun	Jul	Aug	Sep	Oct	Nov	Dec	Year
Record high °C (°F)	8.8 (47.8)	11.3 (52.3)	18.0 (64.4)	25.2 (77.4)	28.5 (83.3)	33.4 (92.1)	33.4 (92.1)	34.4 (93.9)	27.2 (81.0)	20.2 (68.4)	13.1 (55.6)	9.8 (49.6)	34.4 (93.9)
Mean daily maximum °C (°F)	−1.9 (28.6)	−0.6 (30.9)	3.4 (38.1)	10.7 (51.3)	15.4 (59.7)	19.6 (67.3)	22.0 (71.6)	20.3 (68.5)	15.6 (60.1)	8.5 (47.3)	3.4 (38.1)	−1.3 (29.7)	8.7 (47.7)
Daily mean °C (°F)	−5.8 (21.6)	−5.2 (22.6)	−2.0 (28.4)	4.3 (39.7)	9.0 (48.2)	12.9 (55.2)	15.8 (60.4)	14.4 (57.9)	9.8 (49.6)	4.3 (39.7)	0.2 (32.4)	−4.9 (23.2)	4.4 (39.9)
Mean daily minimum °C (°F)	−9.6 (14.7)	−9.6 (14.7)	−7.4 (18.7)	−2.2 (28.0)	2.7 (36.9)	6.3 (43.3)	9.6 (49.3)	8.4 (47.1)	3.9 (39.0)	0.0 (32.0)	−3.0 (26.6)	−8.5 (16.7)	−0.7 (30.7)
Record low °C (°F)	−42.0 (−43.6)	−38.0 (−36.4)	−31.7 (−25.1)	−26.6 (−15.9)	−9.4 (15.1)	−3.9 (25.0)	−0.9 (30.4)	−3.4 (25.9)	−8.2 (17.2)	−17.6 (0.3)	−27.9 (−18.2)	−35.4 (−31.7)	−42.0 (−43.6)
Average precipitation mm (inches)	41.7 (1.64)	29.4 (1.16)	34.6 (1.36)	39.3 (1.55)	48.2 (1.90)	68.0 (2.68)	79.9 (3.15)	80.2 (3.16)	75.6 (2.98)	65.2 (2.57)	62.3 (2.45)	47.0 (1.85)	671.3 (26.43)
Source 1: SMHI Precipitation normals 1961-1990
Source 2: SMHI average data 2002-2015

== Transportation ==
Hagfors airport is located at the town's border. There are flights with Amapola Flyg to Stockholm Arlanda and Torsby airports.

== Sport and recreation ==
Valsarna are a motorcycle speedway club from Tallhult, who compete in the Swedish Speedway Team Championship. Their home track is at the Tallhult Motorstadion which is located to the North of Hagfors on the road to Geijersholm. They are twice league champions of Sweden.

== Notable people ==
- Sebastian Eriksson (born 1993), rallycross driver
- Johan Erkgärds (born 1989), professional ice hockey player
- Stefan Erkgärds (born 1985), professional ice hockey player
- Monica Zetterlund (1937 - 2005), renowned jazz vocalist
