= Psorosa dahliella =

Scientific classification
- Domain: Eukaryota
- Kingdom: Animalia
- Phylum: Arthropoda
- Class: Insecta
- Order: Lepidoptera
- Family: Pyralidae
- Genus: Psorosa
- Species: P. dahliella

Binomial name
- Psorosa dahliella (Treitschke, 1832)

Synonyms
- Phycis dahliella Treitschke, 1832

Species of moth

Psorosa dahliella is a species of snout moth. It is found in France, Spain, Portugal, Switzerland, Italy, Slovakia, Hungary, Croatia, Bosnia and Herzegovina, Romania, Bulgaria, North Macedonia, Greece, Ukraine and Russia.

== Etymology ==
The species is named for the German entomologist Georg Dahl.
