= Sandrabatis =

Scientific classification
- Domain: Eukaryota
- Kingdom: Animalia
- Phylum: Arthropoda
- Class: Insecta
- Order: Lepidoptera
- Family: Pyralidae
- Tribe: Phycitini
- Genus: Sandrabatis; Ragonot, 1893

Type species
- Sandrabatis crassiella Ragonot, 1893

Genus of moths

Sandrabatis is a genus of snout moths described by Émile Louis Ragonot in 1893.

The genus is morphologically similar to Psorosa Zeller, 1846, but it can be distinguished by the forewing with R2 stalked with R3+4.

== Species ==
- Sandrabatis crassiella Ragonot, 1893
- Sandrabatis phaeella Hampson 1903
