= Tjärnheden =

- Location within Sweden
- Coordinates: 59°37′N 13°27′E
- Country: Sweden
- Province: Värmland
- County: Värmland County
- Municipality: Forshaga Municipality

Area
  - Total: 0.21 km^{2} (0.081 sq mi)

Population (2005-12-31)
  - Total: 208
  - Density: 999/km^{2} (2,590/sq mi)
- Time zone: UTC+1 (CET)
  - Summer (DST): UTC+2 (CEST)

Tjärnheden is a village situated in Forshaga Municipality, Värmland County, Sweden with 208 inhabitants in 2005.
