= Råda =

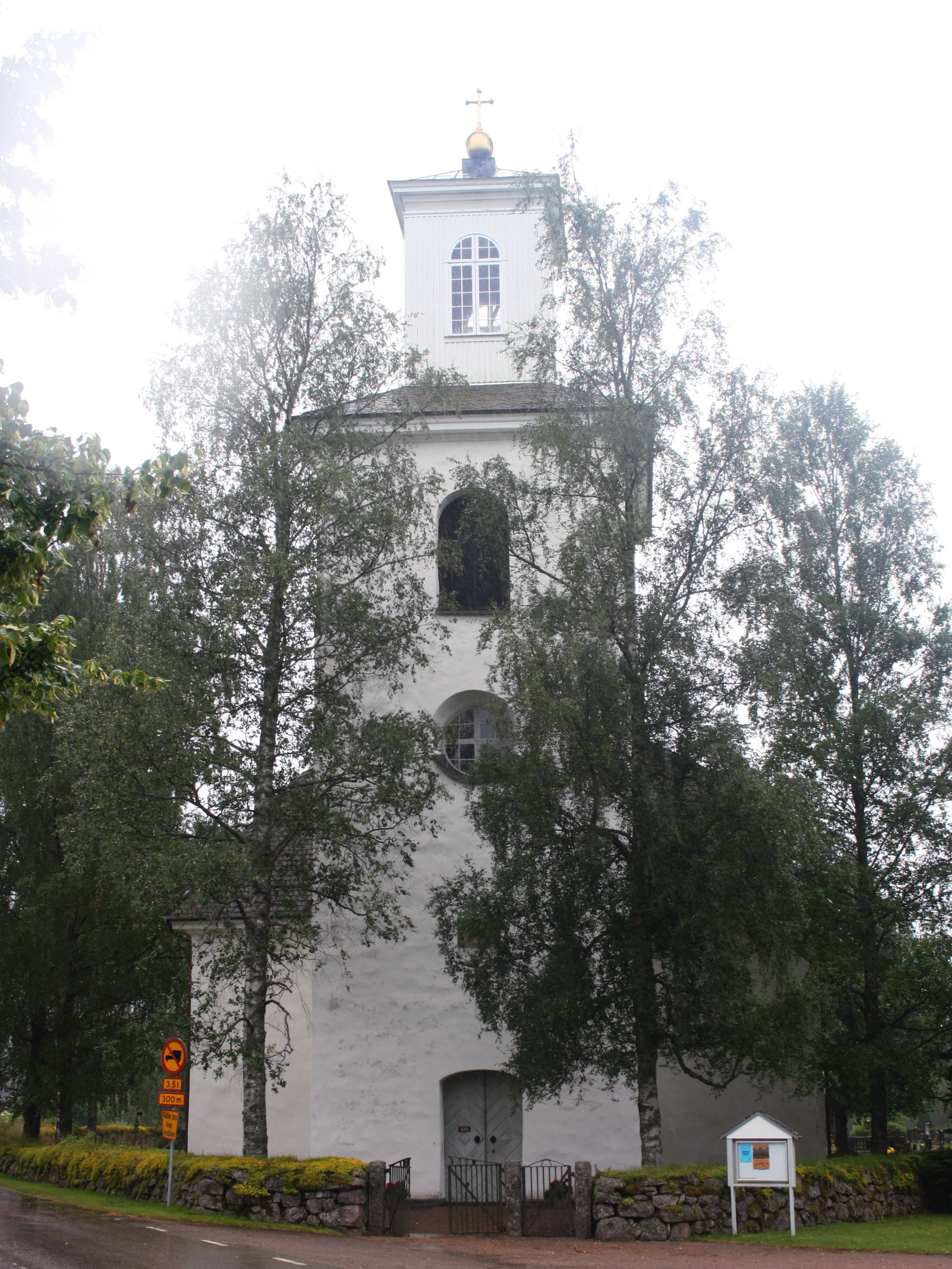
- Råda church, from the north

- Location within Sweden
- Coordinates: 60°00′19″N 13°35′48″E
- Country: Sweden
- Province: Värmland
- County: Värmland County
- Municipality: Hagfors Municipality

Area
  - Total: 1.01 km^{2} (0.39 sq mi)

Population (31 December 2010)
  - Total: 448
  - Density: 442/km^{2} (1,140/sq mi)
- Time zone: UTC+1 (CET)
  - Summer (DST): UTC+2 (CEST)
- Climate: Dfb

Råda is a locality situated in Hagfors Municipality, Värmland County, Sweden with 448 inhabitants in 2010.

== Notable people ==
- Robert Jansson (1889 - 1958), Swedish politician and member of the Centre Party.
