= Psorosa ochrifasciella =

Scientific classification
- Kingdom: Animalia
- Phylum: Arthropoda
- Class: Insecta
- Order: Lepidoptera
- Family: Pyralidae
- Genus: Psorosa
- Species: P. ochrifasciella

Binomial name
- Psorosa ochrifasciella Ragonot, 1887

Species of moth

Psorosa ochrifasciella is a species of snout moth described by Émile Louis Ragonot in 1887. It is found in Turkey.
