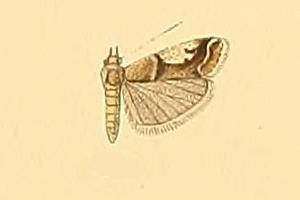

Scientific classification
- Kingdom: Animalia
- Phylum: Arthropoda
- Class: Insecta
- Order: Lepidoptera
- Family: Pyralidae
- Genus: Psorosa
- Species: P. tergestella

Binomial name
- Psorosa tergestella Ragonot, 1901

= Psorosa tergestella =

Species of moth

Psorosa tergestella is a species of snout moth. It is found in Italy and Croatia.

The wingspan is about 18 mm.
