= Psorosa lacteomarginata =

Scientific classification
- Kingdom: Animalia
- Phylum: Arthropoda
- Clade: Pancrustacea
- Class: Insecta
- Order: Lepidoptera
- Family: Pyralidae
- Genus: Psorosa
- Species: P. lacteomarginata

Binomial name
- Psorosa lacteomarginata (A. Costa, 1888)

Synonyms
- Pempelia lacteomarginata A. Costa, 1888

Species of moth

Psorosa lacteomarginata is a species of snout moth. It is found on Sardinia.
