= Mjönäs =

- Location within Sweden
- Coordinates: 59°53′N 13°33′E
- Country: Sweden
- Province: Värmland
- County: Värmland County
- Municipality: Hagfors Municipality

Area
  - Total: 0.75 km^{2} (0.29 sq mi)

Population (31 December 2010)
  - Total: 217
  - Density: 291/km^{2} (750/sq mi)
- Time zone: UTC+1 (CET)
  - Summer (DST): UTC+2 (CEST)
- Climate: Dfb

Mjönäs is a locality situated in Hagfors Municipality, Värmland County, Sweden with 217 inhabitants in 2010.
