= Sandrabatis crassiella =

Scientific classification
- Domain: Eukaryota
- Kingdom: Animalia
- Phylum: Arthropoda
- Class: Insecta
- Order: Lepidoptera
- Family: Pyralidae
- Genus: Sandrabatis
- Species: S. crassiella

Binomial name
- Sandrabatis crassiella Ragonot, 1893

Species of moth

Sandrabatis crassiella is a moth of the family Pyralidae first described by Émile Louis Ragonot in 1893. It is found in Japan and probably in Sri Lanka.
