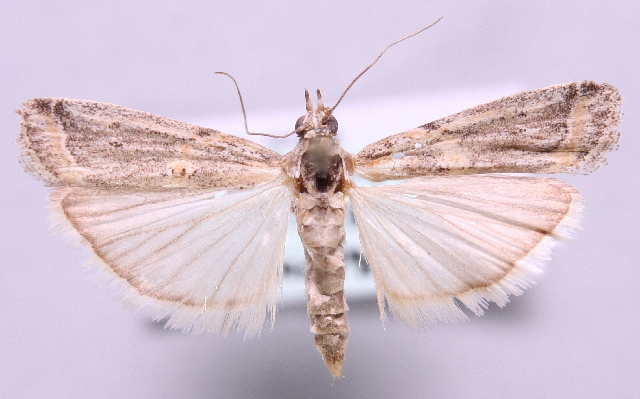

Scientific classification
- Domain: Eukaryota
- Kingdom: Animalia
- Phylum: Arthropoda
- Class: Insecta
- Order: Lepidoptera
- Family: Pyralidae
- Genus: Psorosa
- Species: P. nucleolella

Binomial name
- Psorosa nucleolella (Moschler, 1866)

Synonyms
- Nephopterix nucleolella Moschler, 1866

= Psorosa nucleolella =

Species of moth

Psorosa nucleolella is a species of snout moth. It is found in Finland, Russia, Ukraine, Kazakhstan and Mongolia.

The wingspan is 17–19 mm.
