= Bergsäng =

- Location within Sweden
- Coordinates: 60°08′N 13°33′E
- Country: Sweden
- Province: Värmland
- County: Värmland County
- Municipality: Hagfors Municipality

Area
  - Total: 0.60 km^{2} (0.23 sq mi)

Population (2005-12-31)
  - Total: 201
  - Density: 338/km^{2} (880/sq mi)
- Time zone: UTC+1 (CET)
  - Summer (DST): UTC+2 (CEST)

Bergsäng is a village situated in Hagfors Municipality, Värmland County, Sweden with 201 inhabitants in 2005.

Bergsäng has a football club, Bergsängs BK, which as of 2022 is currently in Division 5 of Swedish football.
