= Forshaga =

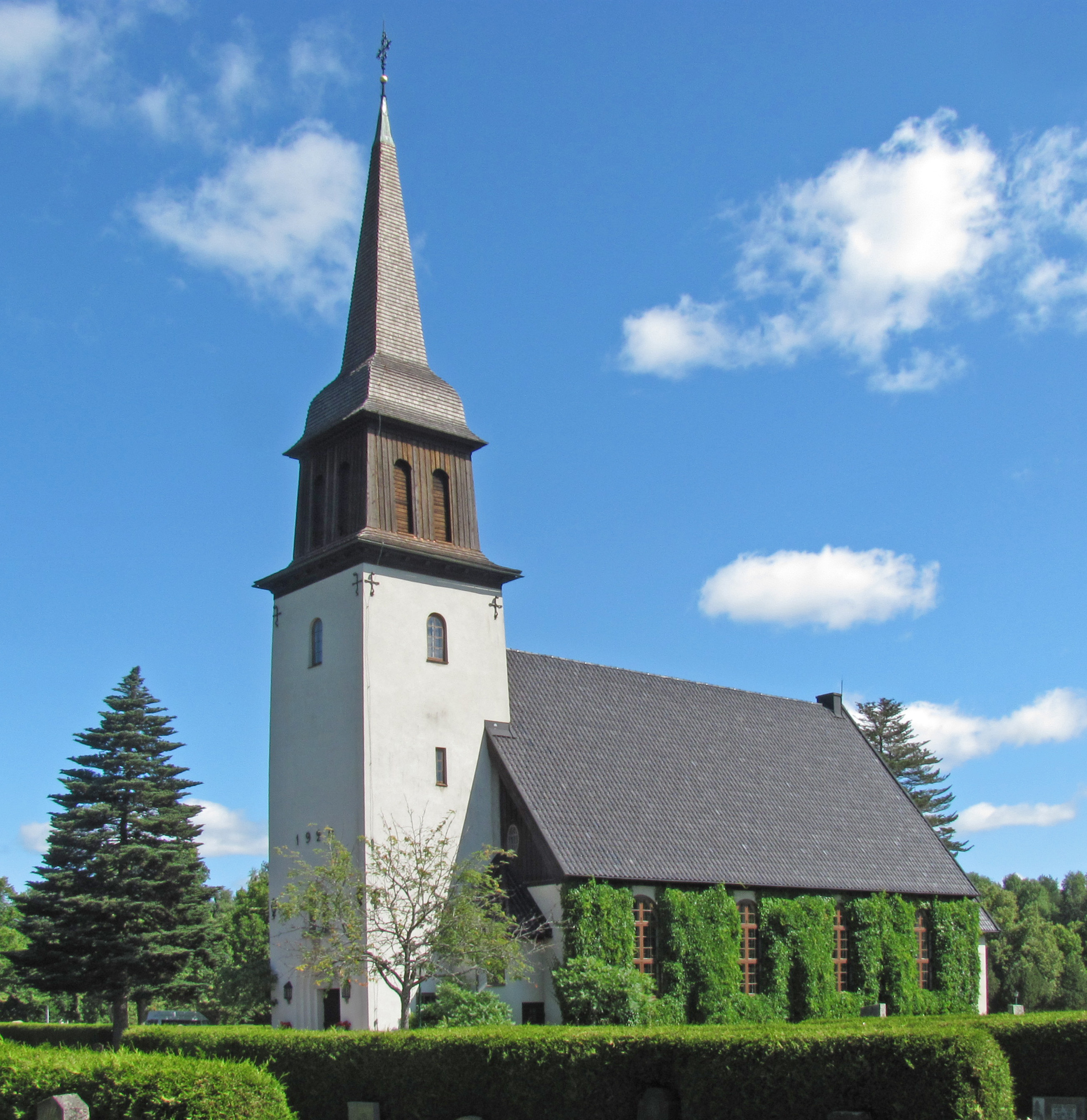
- Forshaga Church

- Location within Sweden
- Coordinates: 59°32′N 13°28′E
- Country: Sweden
- Province: Värmland
- County: Värmland County
- Municipality: Forshaga Municipality

Area
  - Total: 5.18 km^{2} (2.00 sq mi)

Population (31 December 2010)
  - Total: 6,229
  - Density: 1,201/km^{2} (3,110/sq mi)
- Time zone: UTC+1 (CET)
  - Summer (DST): UTC+2 (CEST)

Forshaga is a locality and the seat of Forshaga Municipality, Värmland County, Sweden, with 11,520 inhabitants in 2025.

== Industry ==
The municipality has more than 850 small and medium-sized companies across a broad spectrum of industries. A number of them are active in dental technology and in the care and rehabilitation of youths.

Forshaga municipality is the largest employer with about 950 employees. The largest private company in Forshaga is Stora Enso which has about 100 employees. Stora Enso is active in the paper industry and a member of the regional company cluster Paper Province.

== Notable natives ==
- Stefan Holm, high jump Olympic champion in 2004.
- Sten Tolgfors, Swedish Minister for Defence in the Reinfeldt Cabinet (2007–2012)
- Nisse Nilsson, Swedish ice hockey player.
- Vomitory, Swedish brutal death metal band.
- Pehr G. Holmes, Member of the U.S. House of Representatives from Massachusetts's 4th district (1931-1947)

== Schools ==
- Grossbolsskolan, primary school, elementary school and middle school in Grossbol
- Lärcenter, primary school, elementary school, middle school and junior high school in Lärcenter
- Skived Skolan, in Skived
