= Georg Dahl =

Swedish ichthyologist

- Born: 23 November 1905; Sunnemo, Värmland, Sweden
- Died: 16 August 1979 (aged 73); Kristinehamn, Sweden
- Known for: Ichthyological research in South America
- Scientific career
- Fields: Ichthyology
- Workplaces: University of Bogotá

Georg Dahl (23 November 1905 – 16 August 1979) was a Swedish author and professor of ichthyology at the Francisco José de Caldas District University in Bogotá, Colombia.

== Biography ==
Georg Dahl was born in Sunnemo, Värmland, as the son of forest manager Wilhelm Dahl and Emmy Carlsson.

Between 1936 and 1939, and again from 1946 to 1959, Dahl undertook several research expeditions to South America. In 1958, he was appointed professor at the University of Bogotá, and in 1961 he became head of the fisheries department in Cartagena (Departamento de Investigaciones Ictiológicas y Faunísticas).

Dahl was elected a member of the American Association for the Advancement of Science in 1956, the New York Academy of Sciences in 1957, and the Society of Systematic Zoology in 1958.

In 1936, Dahl married Marta Althén, daughter of landowner Johan Althén and Maria Larsson. He was the brother of zoologist Erik Dahl.

Georg Dahl is buried at the cemetery in Kristinehamn.
