= Pär Ericsson =

Swedish footballer

Personal information
- Full name: Kjell Pär Oskar Ericsson
- Date of birth: 21 July 1988 (age 38)
- Place of birth: Karlstad, Sweden
- Height: 1.83 m (6 ft 0 in)
- Position: Forward

Team information
- Current team: Karlstad

Youth career
- Deje IK

Senior career*
Years	Team	Apps	(Gls)
2005–2008	Carlstad United	43	(17)
2008	→ Degerfors IF (loan)	15	(6)
2009	GAIS	30	(6)
2010–2013	IFK Göteborg	17	(1)
2011–2013	→ Mjällby AIF (loan)	57	(25)
2014	Mons	7	(0)
2014–2016	Kalmar FF	24	(2)
2015	→ Örebro SK (loan)	20	(3)
2016	Jönköpings Södra	11	(1)
2017–2018	Kongsvinger IL	7	(2)
2018–	Karlstad	0	(0)

International career
2009–2010	Sweden U21	6	(1)
- * Club domestic league appearances and goals as of 8 April 2018

Pär Ericsson (born 21 July 1988), sometimes spelled Pär Eriksson, is a Swedish footballer who plays as a striker for Karlstad.

== Career ==
Born in Karlstad, he was raised in Deje. Starting his career in Deje IK, he later moved to Carlstad United BK. In 2008, he spent a short time in Degerfors IF, prior to 2009 season he was close to signing for Örgryte IS; however he instead signed for local rival GAIS as bosman; this upset Carlstad United as they were only receiving about 200,000 SEK while Örgryte IS's bid was claimed to be at least twice as big.

On 25 December 2009, it was announced that IFK Göteborg had signed him for an undisclosed fee. Ericsson failed to make an impact in Göteborg, only scoring once in 17 games and found himself starting on the substitute bench, meanwhile Mjällby AIF was faced with problems following the departure of their main forward Moestafa El Kabir to Cagliari, as a result Ericsson was loaned out to Mjällby during the summer for the duration of the 2011 season. Prior to the 2012 season he returned to Göteborg, in hopes that the new manager Mikael Stahre would give him a chance in the team, he however found himself outside the starting line-up and was soon loaned out to Mjällby yet again for the entire season.
