= Robert Jansson =

Swedish politician

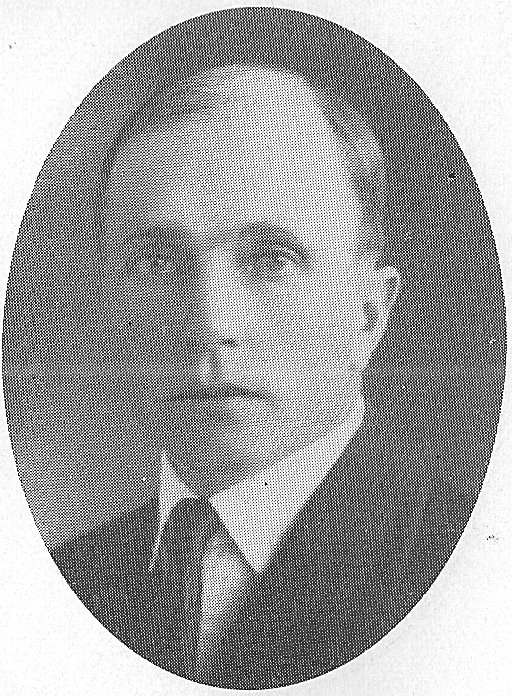
- Born: 27 February 1889; Norra Råda, Sweden
- Died: 15 August 1958; Aspeboda, Sweden
- Political party: Bondeförbundet

Robert Jansson (27 February 1889, in Norra Råda – 15 August 1958) was a Swedish politician, farmer, and member of the Bondeförbundet, now known as the Swedish Centre Party.
