= Psorosa mediterranella =

Scientific classification
- Domain: Eukaryota
- Kingdom: Animalia
- Phylum: Arthropoda
- Class: Insecta
- Order: Lepidoptera
- Family: Pyralidae
- Genus: Psorosa
- Species: P. mediterranella

Binomial name
- Psorosa mediterranella Amsel, 1953

Species of moth

Psorosa mediterranella is a species of snout moth. It is found in France, Spain, Portugal, Italy, Croatia, Bosnia and Herzegovina and North Macedonia.
