= Deje =

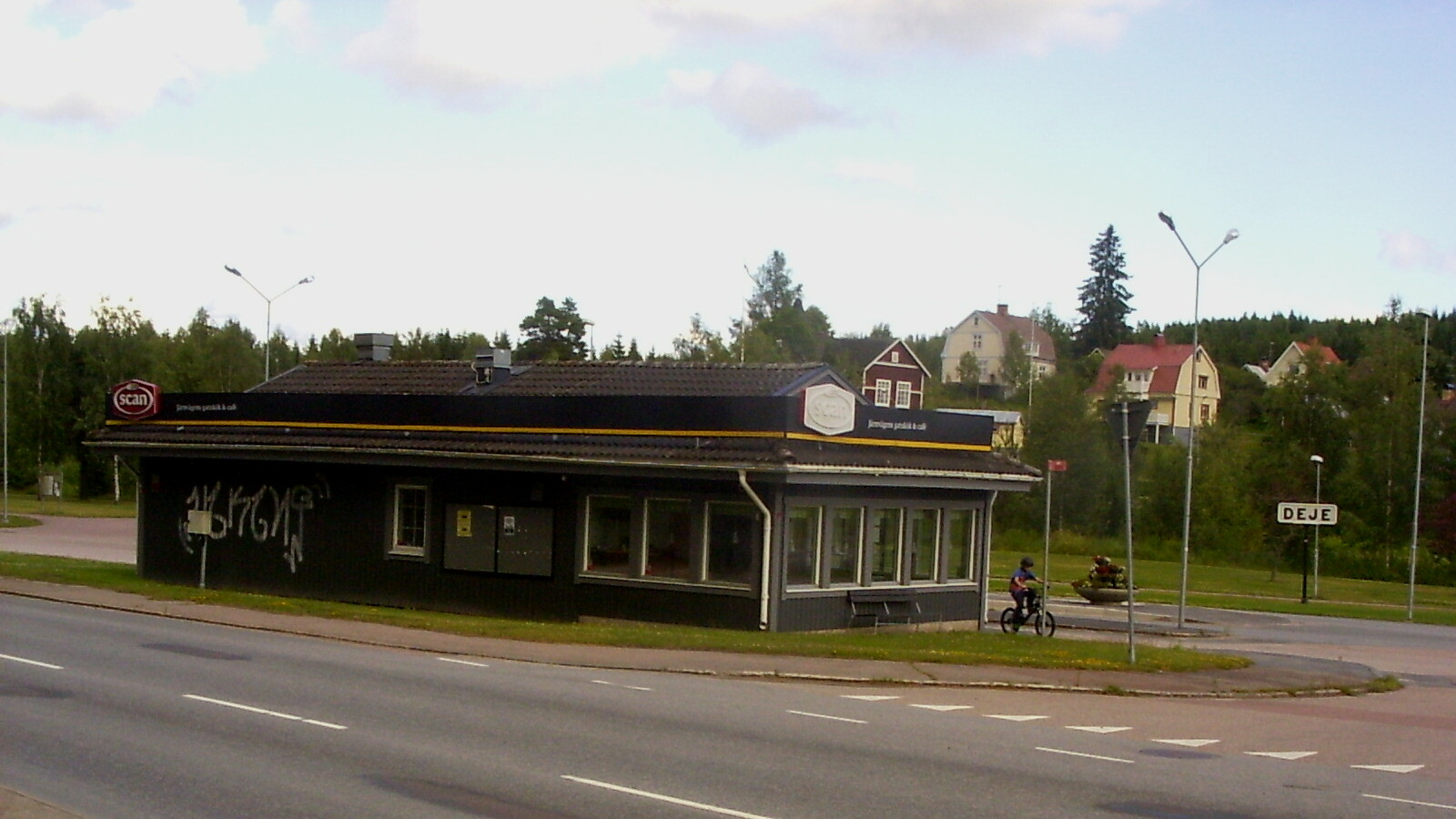
- Järnvägskiosken in 2014

- Location within Värmland County Location within Sweden
- Coordinates: 59°36′N 13°28′E
- Country: Sweden
- Province: Värmland
- County: Värmland County
- Municipality: Forshaga Municipality

Area
  - Total: 3.66 km^{2} (1.41 sq mi)

Population (31 December 2010)
  - Total: 2,742
  - Density: 750/km^{2} (1,900/sq mi)
- Time zone: UTC+1 (CET)
  - Summer (DST): UTC+2 (CEST)

Deje is a locality situated in Forshaga Municipality, Värmland County, Sweden with 2,742 inhabitants in 2010.

== Notable natives ==
- Ulf Sterner, Swedish ice hockey player, first European-born player to play in the National Hockey League (NHL)
- Pär Ericsson, Swedish footballer.
