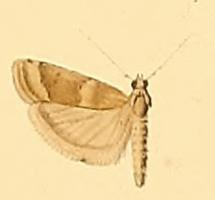

Scientific classification
- Kingdom: Animalia
- Phylum: Arthropoda
- Class: Insecta
- Order: Lepidoptera
- Family: Pyralidae
- Genus: Psorosa
- Species: P. flavifasciella

Binomial name
- Psorosa flavifasciella Hampson, 1901

= Psorosa flavifasciella =

Species of moth

Psorosa flavifasciella is a species of snout moth. It is found in Spain and Portugal.

The wingspan is about 22 mm.
