= Edebäck =

- Location within Sweden
- Coordinates: 60°04′N 13°33′E
- Country: Sweden
- Province: Värmland
- County: Värmland County
- Municipality: Hagfors Municipality

Area
  - Total: 1.28 km^{2} (0.49 sq mi)

Population (2005-12-31)
  - Total: 214
  - Density: 167/km^{2} (430/sq mi)
- Time zone: UTC+1 (CET)
  - Summer (DST): UTC+2 (CEST)

Edebäck is a village situated in Hagfors Municipality, Värmland County, Sweden with 214 inhabitants in 2005.
