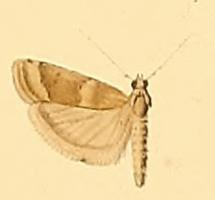
- Psorosa flavifasciella

Scientific classification
- Kingdom: Animalia
- Phylum: Arthropoda
- Clade: Pancrustacea
- Class: Insecta
- Order: Lepidoptera
- Family: Pyralidae
- Tribe: Phycitini
- Genus: Psorosa; Zeller, 1846

Synonyms
- Ectyposa de Joannis, 1929

= Psorosa =

Genus of moths

Psorosa is a genus of snout moths described by Philipp Christoph Zeller in 1846.

== Species ==
- Psorosa africana Balinsky, 1991
- Psorosa dahliella (Treitschke, 1832)
- Psorosa elbursella Amsel, 1954
- Psorosa flavifasciella Hampson, 1901
- Psorosa lacteomarginata (A. Costa, 1888)
- Psorosa mechedella Amsel, 1954
- Psorosa mediterranella Amsel, 1954
- Psorosa myrmidonella Ragonot, 1901
- Psorosa nucleolella (Möschler, 1866)
- Psorosa ochrifasciella Ragonot, 1887
- Psorosa tergestella Ragonot, 1901
- Psorosa tochalella Amsel, 1954
