= Forshaga Municipality =

Forshaga Municipality Forshaga kommun
- Municipality
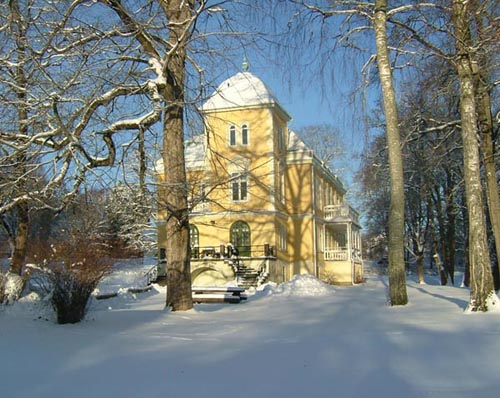
- Slottet villa (1880s)

- Coat of arms

- Coordinates: 59°32′N 13°28′E
- Country: Sweden
- County: Värmland County
- Seat: Forshaga

Area
  - Total: 397.29 km^{2} (153.39 sq mi)
  - Land: 348.18 km^{2} (134.43 sq mi)
  - Water: 49.11 km^{2} (18.96 sq mi)
- Area as of 1 January 2014.

Population (30 June 2025)
  - Total: 11,447
  - Density: 32.877/km^{2} (85.150/sq mi)
- Time zone: UTC+1 (CET)
  - Summer (DST): UTC+2 (CEST)
- ISO 3166 code: SE
- Province: Värmland
- Municipal code: 1763
- Website: www.forshaga.se

Forshaga Municipality (Swedish: Forshaga kommun) is a municipality in Värmland County in west central Sweden. Its seat is located in the town of Forshaga.

The first municipality named Forshaga was a market town (köping) which was detached from Grava in 1944. The local government reform of the 1970s made Forshaga a unitary municipality in 1971 and in 1974 Ullerud was added to it.

Forshaga was known in the 14th century as a location for salmon fishing in the river Klarälven. Salmon was used both locally and transported to monasteries in southern Sweden. Forshaga is still known for its rich fishing waters, which attract hobby sport fishers from all over the country.

== Localities ==
- Forshaga (seat)
- Deje
- Olsäter (59°43′N 13°29′E), with 104 inhabitants in 2023.

== Demographics ==
This is a demographic table based on Forshaga Municipality's electoral districts in the 2022 Swedish general election sourced from SVT's election platform, in turn taken from SCB official statistics.

In total there were 11,590 residents, including 8,824 Swedish citizens of voting age. 49.7% voted for the left coalition and 49.2% for the right coalition. Indicators are in percentage points except population totals and income.

Location	Residents	Citizen adults	Left vote	Right vote	Employed	Swedish parents	Foreign heritage	Income SEK	Degree
Location			%	%					
Deje	2,127	1,691	50.0	48.4	76	88	12	22,757	26
Dejefors	1,842	1,410	45.5	53.8	78	91	9	23,439	28
Forshaga V	1,671	1,191	52.8	46.1	74	82	18	23,031	36
Forshaga Ö	1,330	1,074	52.4	46.3	77	91	9	22,268	33
Grossbol	1,847	1,334	51.4	47.7	84	89	11	26,644	41
Skived V	1,511	1,155	52.1	47.0	85	91	9	26,365	45
Skived Ö	1,262	969	45.0	54.0	86	94	6	27,779	35
Source: SVT
