= Geijersholm =

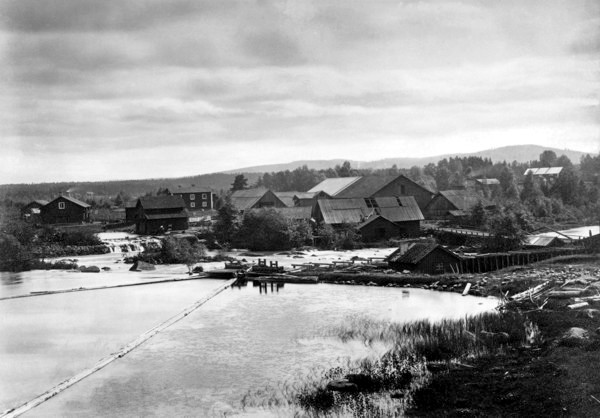

- Location within Sweden
- Coordinates: 60°05′N 13°43′E
- Country: Sweden
- Province: Värmland
- County: Värmland County
- Municipality: Hagfors Municipality

Area
  - Total: 0.29 km^{2} (0.11 sq mi)

Population (31 December 2010)
  - Total: 222
  - Density: 767/km^{2} (1,990/sq mi)
- Time zone: UTC+1 (CET)
  - Summer (DST): UTC+2 (CEST)
- Climate: Dfc

Geijersholm is a locality situated in Hagfors Municipality, Värmland County, Sweden with 222 inhabitants in 2010.
