= Sunnemo =

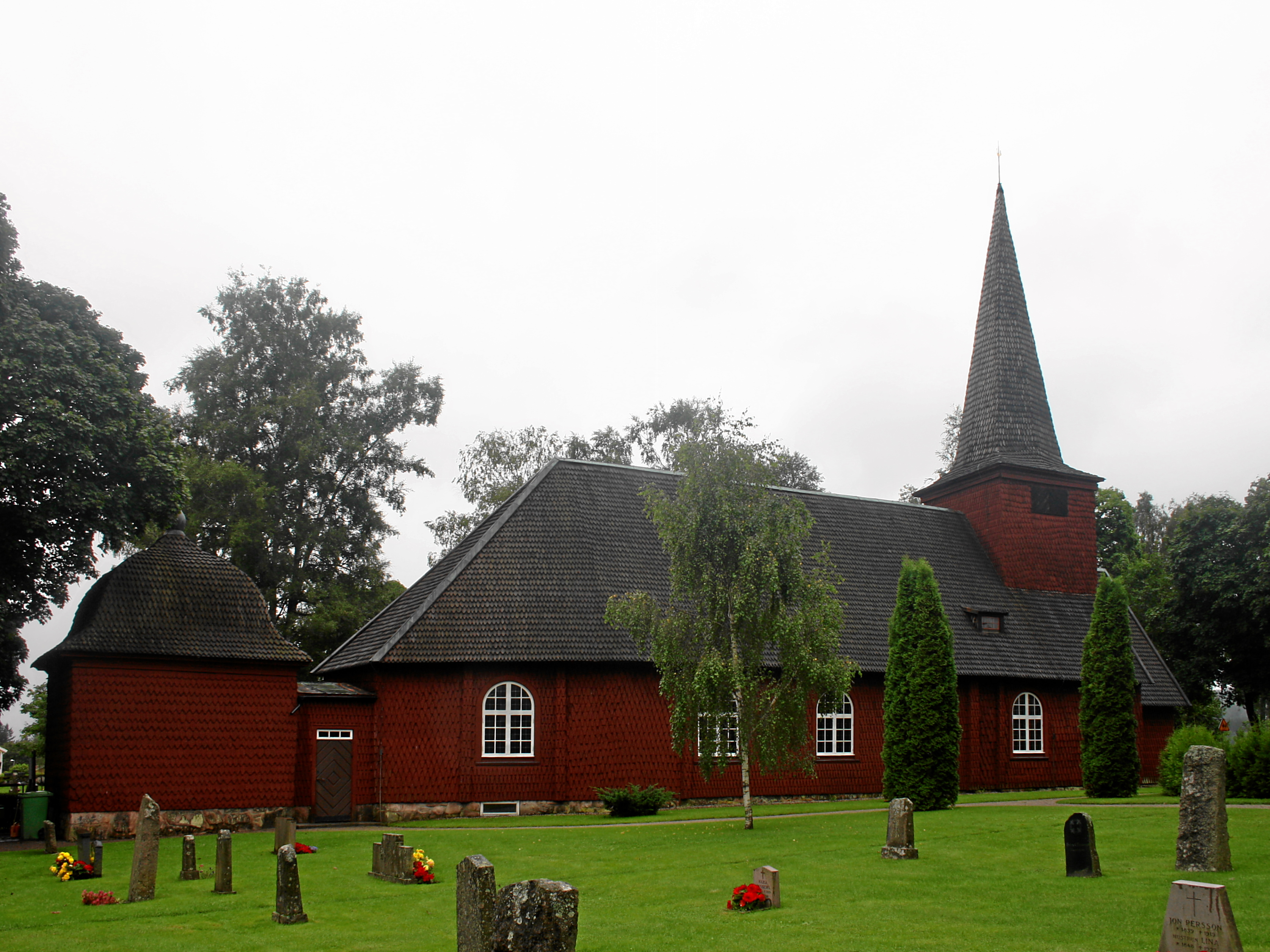
- Sunnemo parish church

- Location within Sweden
- Coordinates: 59°53′N 13°43′E
- Country: Sweden
- Province: Värmland
- County: Värmland County
- Municipality: Hagfors Municipality

Area
  - Total: 0.59 km^{2} (0.23 sq mi)

Population (31 December 2010)
  - Total: 241
  - Density: 411/km^{2} (1,060/sq mi)
- Time zone: UTC+1 (CET)
  - Summer (DST): UTC+2 (CEST)
- Climate: Dfb

Sunnemo (Swedish pronunciation: [ˈsɵ̂nːɛmʊ]) is a locality situated in Hagfors Municipality, Värmland County, Sweden with 241 inhabitants in 2010.
