= Johan Erkgärds =

Swedish ice hockey player (born 1989)

- Born: 12 November 1989 (age 36) Hagfors, SWE
- Height: 6 ft 0 in (183 cm)
- Weight: 176 lb (80 kg; 12 st 8 lb)
- Position: Forward
- Shoots: Left
- GET team Former teams: Frisk Tigers; Färjestad; Skåre; Bofors
- Playing career: 2006–present

Johan Erkgärds (born 12 November 1989 in Hagfors) is a Swedish ice hockey forward who in 2010 and 2013 played for the Frisk Tigers of the Norwegian GET-ligaen. During the 2006/07-season Erkgärds played eight games with Färjestad. The rest of the season has he played with the club's U18 team. Erkgärds was eligible for the 2008 NHL entry draft but was not selected.
