= Ekshärad =

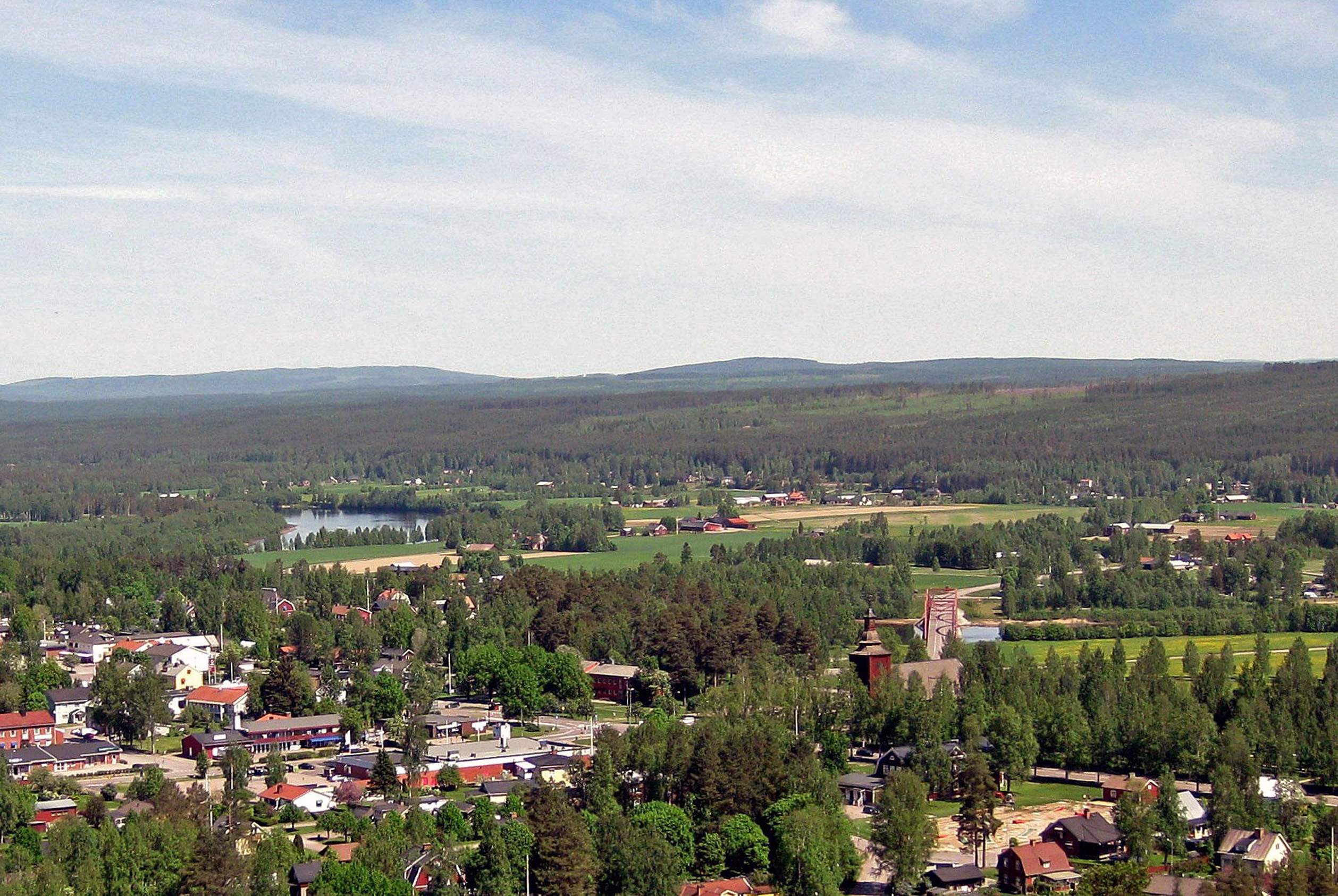
- Ekshärad

- Location within Sweden
- Coordinates: 60°10′N 13°30′E
- Country: Sweden
- Province: Värmland
- County: Värmland County
- Municipality: Hagfors Municipality

Area
  - Total: 1.74 km^{2} (0.67 sq mi)

Population (31 December 2010)
  - Total: 1,074
  - Density: 618/km^{2} (1,600/sq mi)
- Time zone: UTC+1 (CET)
  - Summer (DST): UTC+2 (CEST)
- Climate: Dfb

Ekshärad is a locality in Hagfors Municipality, Värmland County, Sweden with 1,074 inhabitants in 2010. Ekshärad is most famous for its historically rich church. Ekshärad is also well known for the unique Ekshäring dialect.

== Notable people ==
- Carl-Johan Bergman, biatholonist
- David Ekholm, biathlete
- Lennart Hall, professor of music
- Bertil Jonasson, centerpartistisk riksdagsledamot
- Lars Löfgren, head of TV-teatern and Royal Dramatic Theatre
- Gunnar Olsson, professor of Human Geography at Uppsala University
- Sofie Skoog, high jumper
