= The Paper Province =

The Paper Province is a business cluster for the pulp and paper industry in Värmland, northern Dalsland and the county of Örebro in central Sweden. It is focussed on encouraging collaboration on marketing, skills development, procurement, project development and regional growth. The cluster organization is owned and operated by its 90 member companies, from global giants to local suppliers, representing the entire value chain.

== History ==
Business history in Värmland and the surrounding area is strongly influenced by the region's natural wealth. Successful exploitation of the forest started early, and already in the mid-19th century there were more than 50 pulp and paper mills in the region. This attracted both skills and suppliers to the region. Much the technology used and installed in pulp and paper mills throughout the world still originates here.

At the end of the 1990s, the pulp and paper industry was facing severe structural challenges. To meet these needs, seven companies, together with Karlstad’s county and other public bodies, formed the cluster organization 'The Paper Province'. The number of member companies has grown to 90 with over 9,000 employees and annual sales of approximately SEK 17 billion, of which 13.5 billion contributes to Sweden’s net exports. In this, the member companies represent a significant part of the region's economy, with effects on both the regional and national economy.

== Milestones ==
- In 1999, the cluster organization The Paper Province was established.
- In 2004, The Paper Province established The Packaging Greenhouse, an independent and commercial R&D centre featuring a pilot machine and laboratories. Companies from across the world apply to the centre to test new products and services within the packaging industry. The research resources within the region is strengthened by Karlstad University and seven businesses operated R&D centres focusing on pulp and paper.
- In 2007, The Paper Province launched The Energy Square, the world’s first international centre for energy efficiency in the pulp and paper industry. Its aim is to simplify the process for developing new products and services that reduce energy consumption within the global pulp and paper industry. The Energy Square has a strong international appeal and co-operates with, among others, the China National Pulp & Paper Research Institute (CNPPRI).
- In 2007, The Paper Province was appointed one of Europe's most innovative clusters in a survey including more than 2,100 European clusters. The survey was conducted by the European Cluster Observatory, which works on behalf of the European Commission).
- In 2010, The Paper Province was named "A World-Class Cluster" by the European Cluster Observatory and made the top 100 list of the best clusters in the world.
- In 2018, Paper Province received the ECEI Gold Label "Excel in Cluster Excellence", and was recertified in 2020 for the Gold Label.

== Collaboration ==
The Paper Province collaborates with a variety of partners to retain and enhance the competitiveness of the pulp and paper industry. In addition to the member companies, this includes universities and a variety of public actors, such as municipalities, 'Region Värmland', VINNOVA and the Swedish Agency for Economic and Regional Growth (Tillväxtverket).

For several years, 'Region Värmland' has carried out independent surveys measuring the performance of The Paper Province and its impact on member companies. The 2009 survey showed that the member companies found that their participation resulted in increased collaboration, new products and services, increased sales and new job creation.
