= Hagfors Municipality =

Hagfors Municipality Hagfors kommun
- Municipality
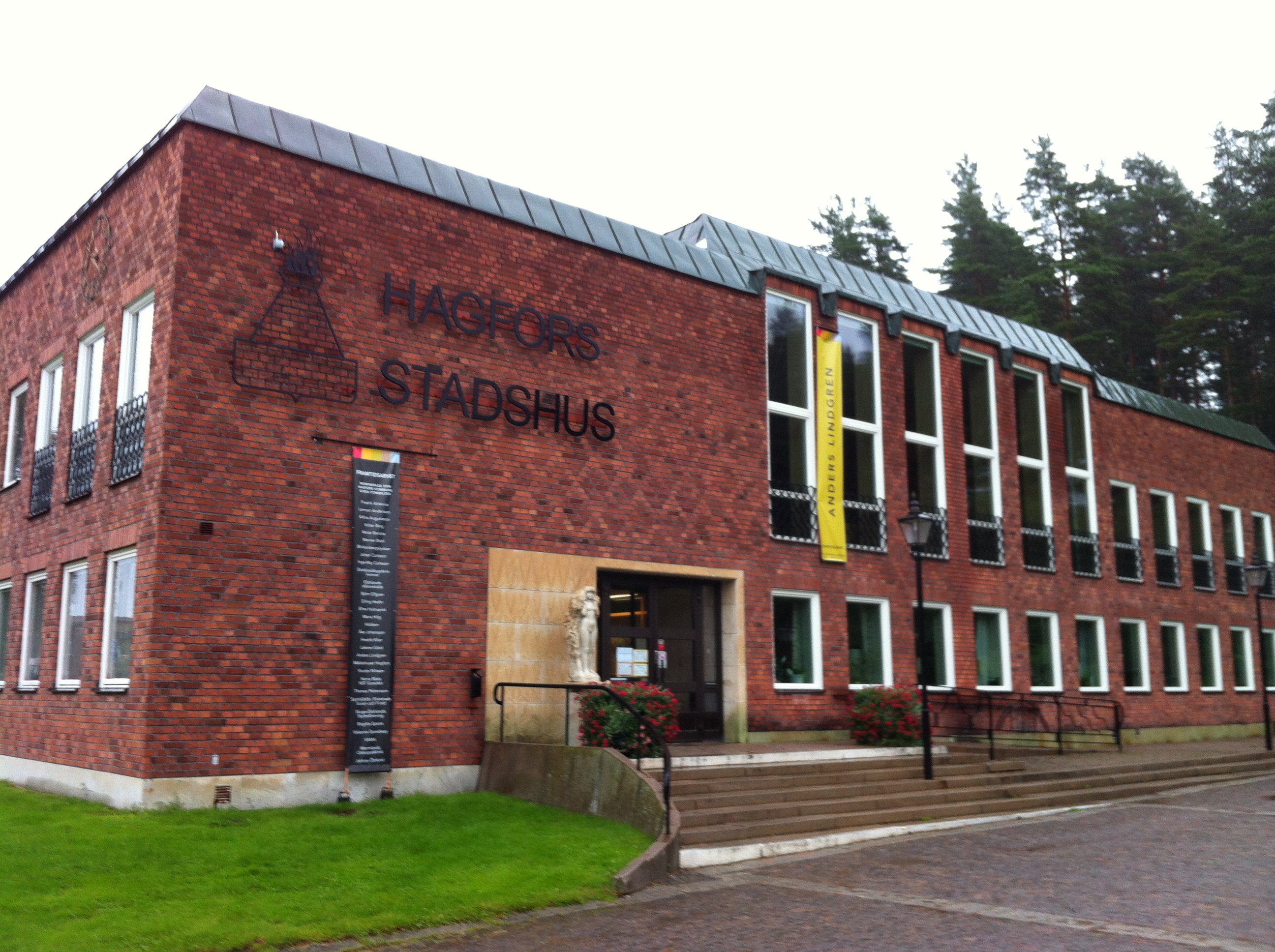
- Hagfors town hall

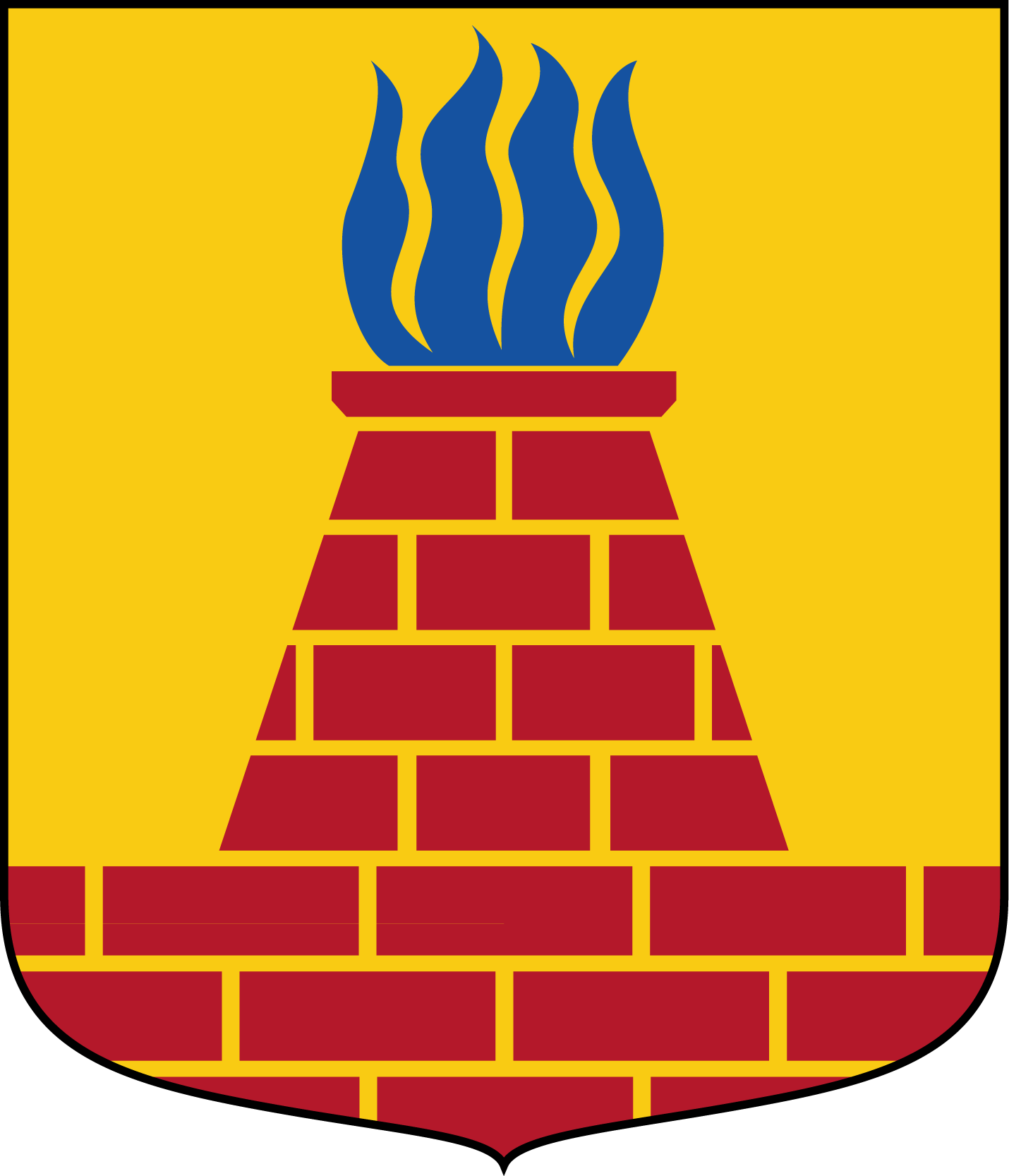
- Coat of arms

- Coordinates: 60°02′N 13°39′E
- Country: Sweden
- County: Värmland County
- Seat: Hagfors

Area
  - Total: 2,000.15 km^{2} (772.26 sq mi)
  - Land: 1,824.17 km^{2} (704.32 sq mi)
  - Water: 175.98 km^{2} (67.95 sq mi)
- Area as of 1 January 2014.

Population (30 June 2025)
  - Total: 11,364
  - Density: 6.2297/km^{2} (16.135/sq mi)
- Time zone: UTC+1 (CET)
  - Summer (DST): UTC+2 (CEST)
- ISO 3166 code: SE
- Province: Värmland
- Municipal code: 1783
- Website: www.hagfors.se

Hagfors Municipality (Swedish: Hagfors kommun) is a municipality in Värmland County in west central Sweden. Its seat is located in the city of Hagfors.

The present municipality was created in 1974, when the City of Hagfors (itself instituted as a municipal entity in 1950 as one of the last cities in Sweden) was amalgamated with three rural municipalities.

Being sparsely populated, Hagfors Municipality has natural areas that offer good fishing, canoeing and wildlife.

== Localities ==
- Bergsäng
- Edebäck
- Ekshärad
- Geijersholm
- Hagfors (seat)
- Mjönäs
- Råda
- Sunnemo
- Uddeholm

== Demographics ==
This is a demographic table based on Hagfors Municipality's electoral districts in the 2022 Swedish general election sourced from SVT's election platform, in turn taken from SCB official statistics.

In total there were 11,543 inhabitants, with 8,852 Swedish citizens of voting age. 54.7% voted for the left coalition and 44.1% for the right coalition. Indicators are in percentage points except population totals and income.

Location	Residents	Citizen adults	Left vote	Right vote	Employed	Swedish parents	Foreign heritage	Income SEK	Degree
Location			%	%					
Ekshärad-Västanberg	2,201	1,705	43.7	55.1	78	85	15	22,192	24
Hagfors C	1,955	1,681	61.9	37.0	74	85	15	21,851	21
Hagfors N	2,060	1,466	56.4	43.1	76	81	19	23,206	24
Hagfors Ö	1,746	1,349	58.1	40.8	75	80	20	23,169	23
Råda-Höje	1,825	1,335	53.0	45.5	75	80	20	21,398	23
Sunnemo-Uddeholm	1,756	1,316	57.0	41.6	81	86	14	24,987	30
Source: SVT
