= List of islands of the Haparanda archipelago =

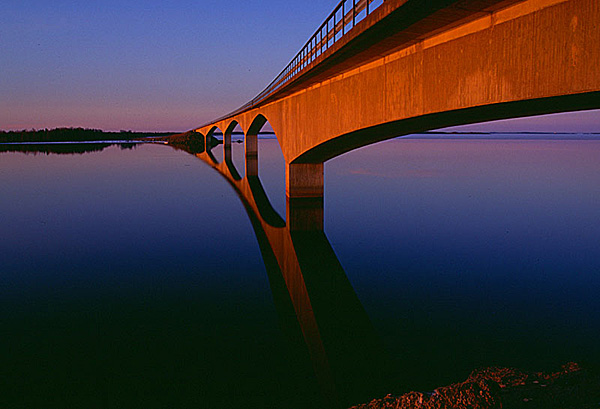
The bridge to Seskaro

This list of islands of the Haparanda archipelago includes the many islands, large and small, in the Swedish Haparanda archipelago in the north of the Bothnian Bay. They are part of the larger archipelago that encompasses islands around the northern end of the bay.

The Swedish Haparanda Archipelago National Park (Swedish: Haparanda skärgårds nationalpark) lies within the Haparanda group of islands, bordering the Finnish Bothnian Bay National Park. It includes the larger islands of Sandskär and Seskar Furö, and some smaller islands and skerries. All of these islands have emerged in the last 1,500 years as the bed of the bay has risen. Islands in Haparanda archipelago include:

- Abborrgrundet
- Ala Penno
- Äimä
- Björn sten
- Blåsut
- Byskär
- Dagsten
- Enskär
- Etukari
- Eva
- Granholmen
- Granvik
- Grusbrännan
- Gunnaren
- Hamngrundet
- Hamngrundet
- Hamppuleiviskä
- Hanhinkari
- Hargrundet
- Harrinkrunni
- Haru
- Hasu
- Hietasaari
- Honkasaarenkrunni
- Honkasaari
- Horden
- Huitori
- Huitorin Ulkokari
- Huitorintöyrä
- Hylkiletto
- Hyyppä
- Hälskerinkrunni
- Höynänkari (north)
- Höynänkari (south)
- Islandet
- Iso Lehtikari
- Isokivenkari
- Isokrunni
- Joutokrunni
- Juopalla
- Kaitta
- Kataja
- Kajava
- Kalkkikari
- Kalkkikari
- Kalliohasu
- Katajankrunni
- Kelkkaletto
- Keräsniemenkari
- Keski Penno
- Klauksenkari
- Klaus
- Koijukari
- Koijuluoto
- Kokkotöyrä
- Korkea
- Kourinkrunni
- Kraaseli
- Kraaseligrundet
- Kraaselikrunni
- Kråkholmarna
- Kuninkaankari
- Kurikanmatalat
- Kurikka
- Kutarna
- Kuusiriskilö
- Kuusitiipuri
- Laahaja
- Laitakari
- Legionen
- Lehmäkari
- Lehtitiipuri
- Leiskeri
- Lellikrunni
- Leppikari
- Leppäriskilö
- Letonkluppi
- Letonkrunni
- Letto
- Liipa
- Lill-Austi
- Lilla Almsten
- Lilla Harrsten
- Lilla Hepokari
- Lilla Vasti
- Länsikrunni
- Lådan
- Långören
- Löngrunden
- Mali
- Matalinkari
- Meriklupu
- Mustakari
- Nidunkari
- Nissu
- Norrviksgrundet
- Nuottalahenkari
- Nälkäkrunni
- Ostgrundet
- Östra Knivskär
- Östra Launinkari
- Öystinkari
- Paha
- Paljas
- Pensaskari
- Pihjalakari
- Pikku Lehtikari
- Pikku Tervakari
- Pikkukrunni
- Pirttiluoto
- Piskan
- Pitkäkari
- Pohjaskluppi
- Pohjaskrunni
- Pojkarna
- Prokko
- Puukko
- Puukkonkrunni
- Pöllö
- Rajakari
- Rautakrunni
- Rautaletto
- Remu
- Revässaari
- Riekonkari
- Riitakrunni
- Riskilö
- Ristikari
- Räiskä
- Salakrunni
- Saltgrundet
- Sandskär
- Santasaari
- Sarven Riskilö
- Sarvenkataja
- Satula
- Selkäkari
- Seskar Furö
- Seskarö
- Skomakaren
- Skratten
- Sprallen
- Stenungarna
- Stor-Austi
- Stora Almsten
- Stora Harrsten
- Stora Hamnskär
- Stora Hepokari
- Stora Vasti
- Svartsten
- Säivisklubbarna
- Sinnerstenarna
- Sipi
- Sölkäkari
- Sölkäkari
- Sölkäkarinkrunni
- Taipaleenkari
- Tallrikarna
- Tantamanni
- Tervakari
- Tervaletto
- Tervasaarenkrunni
- Tiilikrunni
- Tirro
- Tomten
- Torne-Furö
- Torne-Furögrund
- Torvikari
- Töyrä
- Vasikka
- Vasikkasaari
- Vasikkasaari (Nikkala)
- Västra Knivskär
- Vettarna
- Viinalanmatala
- Vikaren
- Vähä Lehtikari
- Vågören
- Ykspihlaja
- Yli Penno
- Ylikari (north)
- Ylikari (south)

== See also ==
List of islands of Bothnian Bay
