= Furo (disambiguation) =

Furo (風呂) is a Japanese traditional bath.

Furo may also refer to:

- Furo (風炉), a hearth used in Japanese tea ceremonies
- Furo (fish), an extinct genus of ray-finned fish
- Furo (river channel), a type of river channel in the Brazilian Amazon basin
- Furo Girl!, a Japanese manga series
- Furo MTV, a Brazilian satiric newscast

Furö may refer to several islands off the coast of Sweden:

- Furö
- Torne-Furö
- Seskar Furö

== People ==
- Kaye Furo, Belgian footballer
- Yasumasa Furo, Japanese sport shooter
- Furo Iyenemi, Nigerian footballer
