= Haparanda Municipality =

Haparanda Municipality Haparanda kommun
- Municipality
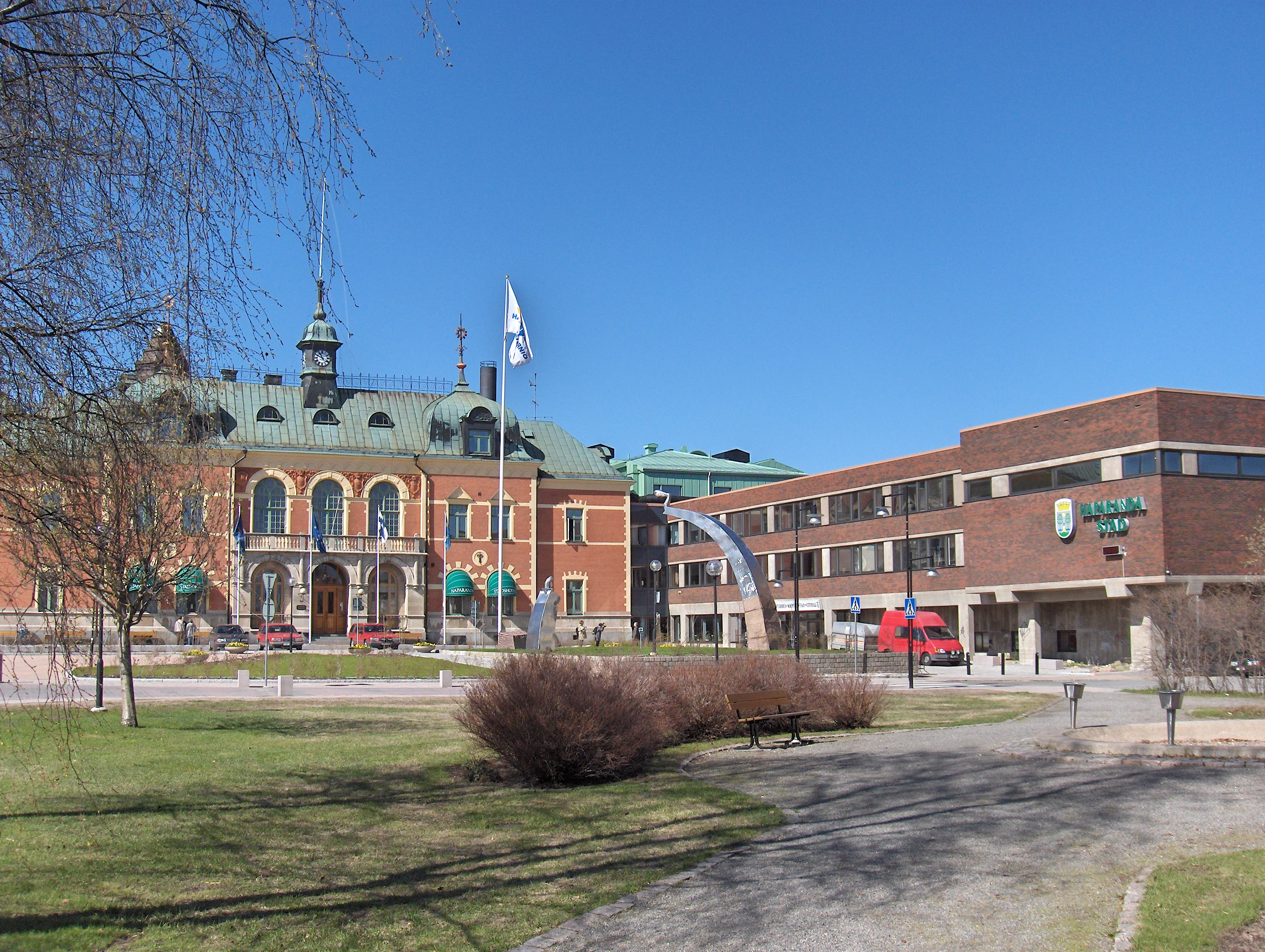
- Haparanda Hotel to the left, and the City Hall

- Coat of arms

- Coordinates: 65°50′N 24°08′E
- Country: Sweden
- County: Norrbotten County
- Seat: Haparanda

Area
  - Total: 1,868.27 km^{2} (721.34 sq mi)
  - Land: 922.76 km^{2} (356.28 sq mi)
  - Water: 945.51 km^{2} (365.06 sq mi)
- Area as of 1 January 2014.

Population (30 June 2025)
  - Total: 9,129
  - Density: 9.893/km^{2} (25.62/sq mi)
- Time zone: UTC+1 (CET)
  - Summer (DST): UTC+2 (CEST)
- ISO 3166 code: SE
- Province: Norrbotten
- Municipal code: 2583
- Website: www.haparanda.se

Haparanda Municipality (Swedish: Haparanda kommun; Meänkieli and Finnish: Haaparannan kunta) is a municipality in Norrbotten County in northern Sweden. Its seat is located in Haparanda (Meänkieli: Haaparanta).

In 1967 the "City of Haparanda" was merged with the rural municipalities Karl Gustav and Nedertorneå. Since 1971 Haparanda, like all other municipalities of Sweden, is a municipality of unitary type. However, it prefers to use the title stad ("city") for the whole territory, including the non-urban parts.

== Geography ==
In Sweden, Haparanda Municipality borders Övertorneå Municipality to the north and Kalix Municipality to the west.

Haparanda Municipality is located on the western side of where the Torne River discharges into the Bay of Bothnia. On the other side of the river lies the Finnish town Tornio (Swedish: Torneå). Haparanda and Tornio jointly call themselves "EuroCity".

Although Haparanda has a boat harbor, it is not accessible for larger vessels and is not, as often thought, the Baltic Sea's northernmost port, that honor most probably belonging to Töre further west on the Swedish coast.

The municipality includes the Haparanda archipelago, with 652 islands in the bay of Bothnia, part of the larger Norrbotten archipelago. The Haparanda Archipelago National Park lies within the Haparanda group of islands. It includes the larger islands of Sandskär and Seskar Furö, and some smaller islands and skerries. Some of the other islands in the Haparanda archipelago include Hanhinkari, Kataja, Seskarö, Skomakaren, Stora Hamnskär, Stora Hepokari and Torne-Furö.

=== Localities ===
There are five localities (or urban areas) in Haparanda Municipality:

#	Locality	Population
1	**Haparanda**	4,778
2	Marielund	1,865
3	Seskarö	498
4	Nikkala	447
5	Karungi	232

The municipal seat in bold

== Demographics ==
This is a demographic table based on Haparanda Municipality's electoral districts in the 2022 Swedish general election sourced from SVT's election platform, in turn taken from SCB official statistics.

Haparanda has a high degree of people of foreign background since records were kept in 2002, mainly a result of cross-border connections with Tornio and Finland. In total there were 6,198 Swedish citizens of voting age resident in the municipality. 73% of the population has a Finnish-background (a person who was either born in Finland or has at least one grandparent born in Finland). 59% of the population was born in Sweden, 33% were born in Finland and 8% elsewhere.

47.7% voted for the left coalition and 51.3% for the right coalition. Indicators are in percentage points except population totals and income.

Location	Residents	Citizen adults	Left vote	Right vote	Employed	Swedish parents	Foreign heritage	Income SEK	Degree
Location			%	%					
Grankullen	1,121	750	44.1	54.9	78	59	41	26,566	30
Haparanda N	2,365	1,459	46.0	52.3	67	40	60	19,798	24
Haparanda S	1,580	1,105	51.5	47.0	67	40	60	19,977	30
Karungi	913	605	41.9	57.4	74	66	34	20,761	22
Marielund	2,008	1,183	48.8	50.6	67	40	60	22,044	24
Nikkala	1,031	742	48.2	51.3	78	66	34	24,213	26
Seskarö	467	354	64.1	35.9	72	69	31	21,187	25
Source: SVT

== Twin towns – sister cities ==
Haparanda is twinned with:

- Hammerfest, Norway
- Kovdor, Russia
- Širvintos, Lithuania

== See also ==
- Sweden Finns
- Meänkieli
- List of islands of the Haparanda archipelago
