= Skomakaren =

Island in the Haparanda archipelago, Sweden

- Location within Sweden

Geography
- Coordinates: 65.689482°N 23.979540°E
- Adjacent to: Bay of Bothnia

Administration
- Sweden
- County: Norrbotten
- Municipality: Haparanda

Skomakaren is an island in the northeast of the Swedish sector of the Bothnian Bay, in the Haparanda archipelago.

== Location ==
Skomakaren ("shoemaker") is also called Suutari by the local people. It lies in the central part of the Haparanda archipelago, the sector of the Norrbotten archipelago that is included in the Haparanda Municipality. All of the islands in the Haparanda archipelago have emerged in the last 1,500 years or so, as the bed of the bay has risen due to post-glacial rebound following the last ice age.

== Description ==
The water around the island is relatively shallow. The highest point is 27 metres (89 ft) above sea level. The island has a large sandy beach on its northeastern side. There is a sheltered harbor at Norrviken. Visitors may pick berries and mushrooms in season.

As with Sandskär and Hamnskär, the island has potential for development of tourist facilities. The island has the remains of old fishing villages that could be developed as cultural attractions. There are no known special environmental concerns. A single port for seasonal residents and visitors could be built in the Norrviken area, or in the lagoon on the west side.
