= Revontulet =

Communist weekly newspaper in Sweden

Revontulet (the Finnish word for aurora, lit. "foxfire") was a Finnish language communist weekly newspaper published in Luleå, Sweden. Sven Linderot was the editor of the paper. The first issue was published on 3 January 1919. It was often considered as the Finnish-language edition of the Swedish-language newspaper Norrskensflamman, and was printed as the same printing shop as its Swedish-language counterpart (A.B. Norrskenet).

Copies of Revontulet were smuggled into Finland, during winter months the smugglers carried it over the frozen sea between Seskarö and Kemi. During the winter of 1918-1919 a group of smugglers were fired upon by border guards.

After 1921 the publication of Revontulet became more sporadic. As many Finnish red refugees accepted Swedish government aid to migrate to Soviet Russia, the readership decreased. No issues were published in 1922. Publishing resumed on 11 October 1923 and continued until 24 April 1924. On 28 May 1927 a last and final issue was published.
