= Sweden during World War I =

Sweden, following its long-standing policy of neutrality in place since the end of the Napoleonic Wars, remained neutral throughout World War I from 28 July 1914 to 11 November 1918. However, maintaining this neutrality was challenging, and at different times, Sweden expressed sympathy towards various parties involved in the conflict.

Despite strong pro-German sentiment both in the Swedish nobility and in Swedish political circles, Sweden did not enter the war on the German side. Instead, Sweden retained armed neutrality and continued to trade with both the Entente Powers and the Central Powers. Swedish trade with Germany, particularly in iron ore, eventually led to exports of food to Sweden being greatly reduced, especially after America's entry into the war in 1917. The resulting food shortages, and public unrest in the form of hunger marches and riots, caused the downfall of Sweden's conservative government which was replaced eventually by a social democrat one, bringing about an era of political reform in Sweden.

Sweden intervened militarily in Åland after the collapse of Russia into civil war and the advent of Finnish independence in 1918 and briefly occupied the islands, which Sweden had long sought to acquire because of a large Swedish population that supported annexation, but which were also claimed by Finland. However Sweden ultimately withdrew following Finnish protests. Significant numbers of Swedes also took part as volunteers in the Finnish Civil War, with the 350-strong Swedish brigade playing a role in the decisive Battle of Tampere.

At the end of the war, Sweden was not a signatory of the Treaty of Versailles, which brought the conflict to a conclusion, but Sweden joined the League of Nations, which was formed as a result of the treaty and so it was bound by its restriction of German rearmament. However, Swedish firms provided assistance to their German counterparts that helped them avoid the restrictions of the treaty.

== Immediate prewar period ==
=== German sympathies ===
During the early years of the 20th century the sympathies of the Swedish monarch, and of the Swedish military, were believed to be with the Germans due to cultural links and a shared fear of Imperial Russia. According to the Austrian ambassador to the Ottoman Empire, in 1904, during the Russo-Japanese War, Swedish King Oscar II had proposed an offensive military alliance with the Ottoman Empire against Russia, which was in a difficult military situation. Oscar's successor, King Gustaf V was married to a German, Victoria of Baden, a first cousin of Kaiser Wilhelm II, and the Swedish Marshal of the Realm, Ludvig Douglas, was also known to be a strong proponent of an alliance with Germany. In November 1910, the general staffs of Germany and Sweden had even met in secret to discuss a joint offensive against Saint Petersburg, but the meeting ended without a binding agreement being reached.

While as the royalty of Sweden sympathised with Germany, a number of Sweden's social-democratic politicians were also favourably inclined towards Germany because of their positive view of Germany's social security system and its industrial and scientific achievements. Prominent pro-Germans in the ranks of the Social Democrats included Otto Jarte and Yngve Larsson, both of whom were expelled from the Swedish Social Democratic Party in 1915 for contributing to a book that urged "courageously lining up on Germany's side".

=== Rearmament crisis ===
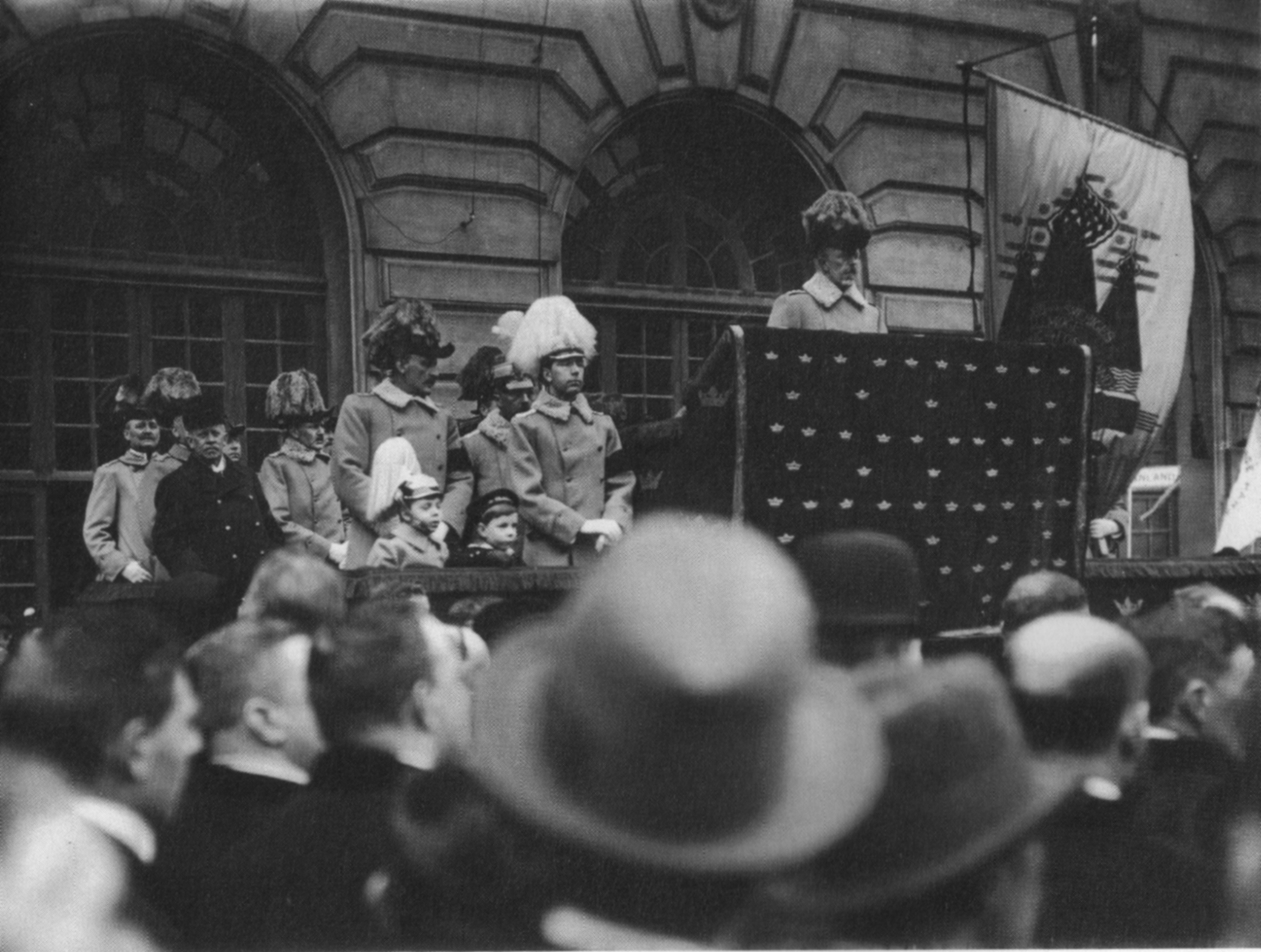
King Gustaf V giving the Courtyard Speech

Rearmament was a special concern in Sweden because of the growing tensions in Europe. When Karl Staaff's government proposed a reduction in military spending and the cancellation of the order for the coastal defence ships that were later known as the Sverige-class coastal defence ship, more than 30,000 Swedish farmers marched to Stockholm to protest in the Peasant armament support march. In response, King Gustaf gave a speech written by the ardently pro-German explorer Sven Hedin in the courtyard of the Royal Palace in Stockholm that argued for higher military spending.

The speech prompted a constitutional crisis in Sweden (the so-called "Courtyard Crisis") because of the interference of the crown in the running of the state, as the constitutional monarchy was supposed to be neutral in partisan politics. When King Gustaf refused to tone down his rhetoric on the subject of defence spending, Karl Staaff's government resigned and was replaced by the conservative government of Hjalmar Hammarskjöld.

== Early war period ==
European military alliances prior to the outbreak of war. Triple Entente Triple Alliance Neutral

=== July Crisis ===
During the July Crisis, both King Gustaf and Knut Wallenberg, the Swedish foreign minister, gave assurances to the Central Powers that in a war between Germany and Russia, Sweden would never stand on Russia's side, and that although Sweden would issue a declaration of neutrality at the start of the conflict she would retain the freedom to take other action later. The assurances given by King Gustaf and Knut Wallenberg led the German secretary of the foreign ministry, Gottlieb von Jagow, to believe that Germany would be supported by Sweden in the upcoming conflict. Talks even took place between the military and naval staffs of Sweden and Germany on cooperation, and preliminary arrangements were made for Germany to use bases and anchorages on the east coast of Sweden and on the island of Gotland.

Wallenberg also warned the Germans that Sweden could not intervene too soon as this might prompt a British intervention in the conflict, although this in turn led the German minister in Stockholm, Franz von Reichenau, to suggest that if Britain entered the conflict Germany should issue an ultimatum demanding that Sweden join the war. At the same time messages were sent by the Swedish foreign ministry to Russia promising that Sweden would remain neutral, although troops were sent to watch Sweden's frontier with Russian-ruled Finland.

=== Declarations of neutrality ===
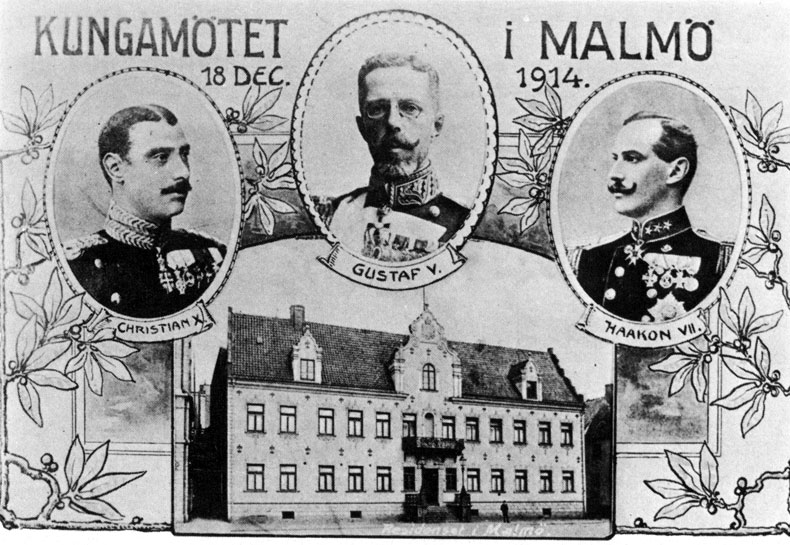
A card representing the meeting of the kings of Denmark, Norway, and Sweden. At the top "The royal meeting in Malmö" is written in Swedish.

Sweden declared neutrality in the Austro-Serbian conflict on 31 July 1914, and in the general conflict of Germany against France and Russia on 3 August. Both declarations left open the possibility that Sweden might later change her position if other countries joined the conflict. On 2 August, however, Wallenberg, speaking to the British minister in Stockholm, had repeated his assertion that if Sweden were driven into the war, she would never fight on the side of Russia. Apparently fearful that Germany might issue an ultimatum demanding Sweden choose sides (something the German Kaiser had threatened to do during a visit by King Gustaf to Germany in 1913) Wallenberg also promised Franz von Reichenau that Swedish neutrality would be "benevolent" to Germany.

The position of Norway also concerned Wallenberg, as he believed that the Norwegians would prefer to intervene on the British side if they entered the war. On 8 August the two countries (Sweden and Norway) issued a joint declaration of neutrality warning that they would maintain their neutrality against all belligerents and would guarantee each other's neutrality. A further joint declaration was made by the three kings of Denmark, Norway, and Sweden on 18 December 1914, and the Swedish army units that had been sent to the Finnish border were stood down.

=== Germany offers an alliance ===
In early 1915, Arthur Zimmermann, the Under-Secretary of State at the German foreign ministry, approached Hammarskjöld, who was on a visit to Berlin, with an offer of potentially forming a "Nordic Block" under Swedish leadership in return for an alliance between Sweden and Germany. Whilst Hammarskjöld rebuffed this first offer, Zimmermann persisted and approached Ludvig Douglas with an offer for a renewed Swedish Empire covering Finland and the Baltic provinces of the Russian Empire. Douglas then conveyed this offer to King Gustaf on 8 June 1915, and also to Hammarskjöld and Wallenberg, however only King Gustaf received it positively.

Following this failure, Prince Maximilian of Baden, a cousin of the Swedish Queen Victoria, made a further overture to King Gustaf. Prince Max had been instructed by Kaiser Wilhelm II and Erich von Falkenhayn, who wished to integrate Sweden into the German Mitteleuropa, to obtain an alliance with a view to a joint attack on St. Petersburg, in return Germany was willing to offer material and military support as well as the promise of Åland (which contained a Swedish-speaking population, and the fortification of which by the Russians during 1915 caused concern in Sweden), an adjustment of the frontier, and an independent or autonomous Finland. King Gustaf rejected this offer on 20 November 1915 as, without a clear casus belli, he could not be sure of popular support for the war.

On 1 December 1915 two leading pro-German Swedish political figures, the Social Democrat Otto Järte, and the conservative editor Adrian Molin, had an audience with King Gustaf in which they urged him to join the war on Germany's side. They urged him to consider that "If the Entente wins, ideas of republicanism and parliamentarism will win the ratification of world history". According to Otto Järte's account, the King stated repeatedly that he was of the same view and that Sweden would "speed into action" once German forces had entered Finland; however, according to Järte the King also stated that as a constitutional monarch he could not make any binding promises.

Whilst talk of an alliance eventually came to nothing, Sweden did favour Germany over Russia in at least one important respect. Knut Wallenberg, without the knowledge of Hammarskjöld, allowed the Germans to use Swedish ciphers to communicate with their embassies overseas, and these communications were carried over the telegraph cables used by Sweden to communicate with their embassies. This allowed the Germans to communicate with their embassies via Stockholm without their communications being so easily censored and intercepted by the British. Despite claiming that they would end the practice in late 1915, a scandal erupted in 1917 when it became known that a telegram from the German chargé d'affaires in Argentina, Count Luxburg, to Berlin proposing that certain Argentine ships be "sunk without trace" had been transmitted via the facilities of the Swedish foreign ministry. This became known as the "Luxburg Affair".

Swedish exports to Germany increased massively after the war started, with exports for the two months December 1914 to January 1915 being eight times that of December 1913 to January 1914. This great increase in exports helped Germany mitigate the effect of the stringent Allied blockade on German trade.

== Swedish military preparedness during the war ==
=== Army ===
During the entirety of the war, the active strength of the Swedish army never exceeded 13,000 men, even after the doubling in strength requested in Hammarskjöld's Army Bill of 1914 of reserve formations from six to twelve infantry divisions and a cavalry division. As the war went on and the threat of invasion receded, the number of active, deployable men, by 1918, had fallen as low as 2,000.

While relatively well equipped by the standards of 1914, as the war went on this force was less and less well prepared for fighting a conflict according to the prevailing standards of the day. For example, in 1914 the number of machine guns in a Swedish army division's establishment (24) was roughly the same as that of a division of the German or French army, however by 1918 French army divisions had 108 heavy and 405 light machine guns, whilst German army divisions had 108 heavy and 216 light machine guns, a Swedish army division still had 24. The situation with field artillery was similar: in both 1914 and 1918 the average Swedish infantry battalion was supported by 3.6 field guns, a figure similar to that of the great powers in 1914, yet by 1918 the equivalent figure for a German battalion was 8.4 and for a French battalion was 12.

In terms of doctrine and tactics, the Swedes were inexperienced in modern warfare. The only experienced officers in the Swedish army were those who observed the ongoing war on the Western, Italian and Eastern fronts of the world war, or who volunteered for service in one of the belligerent armies.

=== Navy ===
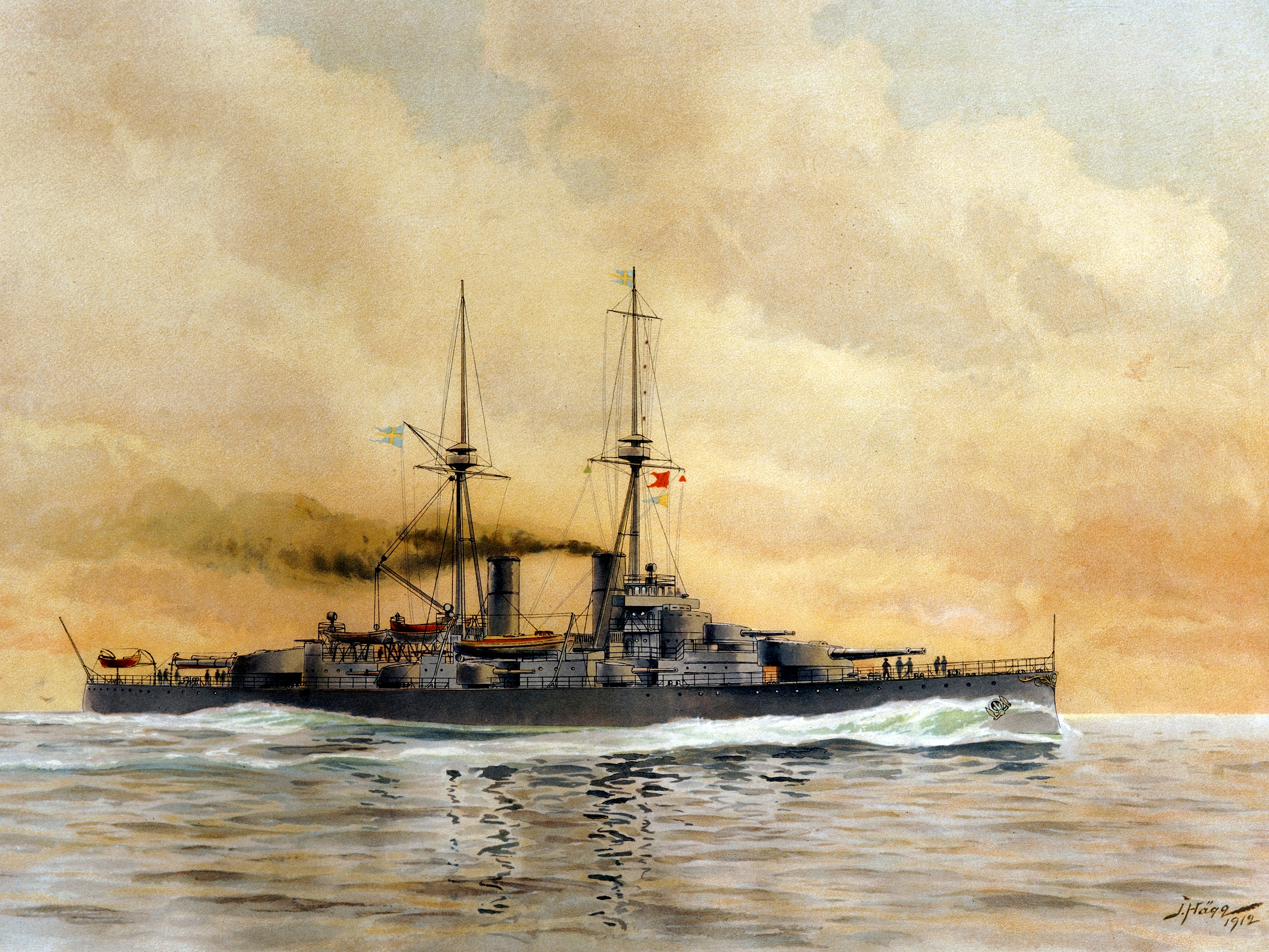
HSwMS Sverige, depicted in her originally-intended form

Sweden began the 20th century with one of the strongest navies outside of the great powers, with 13 major warships. By 1914 it had an additional small mine-laying cruiser (the HSwMS Clas Fleming), as well as 8 destroyers and 10 submarines. However, Sweden lacked any true dreadnought-type warships, and, of the three heavy Sverige-class warships ordered before the war, only one was completed before the war's end (HSwMS Sverige, launched in 1915 and commissioned in 1917).

The coastal defence branch of the Swedish armed forces, the Kustartilleriet (coastal artillery), fell within the purview of the navy, had a strength of 7,500 men in 1914 (roughly half of the Navy's total active strength of 15–16,000 officers and rating). Despite its name, the Kustartilleriet did not consist only of artillery units, but also included infantry regiments formed separately to those of the army, and included both mobile and static defence forces.

The main weight of defending Swedish neutrality during the war fell on the Swedish navy.

=== Air forces ===
The Swedes began the war with relatively few aircraft in military service, with reconnaissance groups being formed in both the army and the navy. The Swedish navy's group was originally formed in 1911, when a single Blériot monoplane was gifted to the navy. In 1913 a special naval aviation corps, the "Marinens Flygväsende" (MFV) was founded in Stockholm, and by 1914 this had expanded to include, in addition to the Blériot, two Henri Farmans and a Donnet-Leveque flying boat, all of which were based at Oscar Frederiksborg.

During the war the total Swedish strength was expanded to a few dozen aircraft, many of these being bought through private subscription. In 1916 fighter aircraft were added to Sweden's air forces. However, Sweden's airforces were lacking in experience, doctrine, and tactics, and it was not until 1926 that an independent airforce was established.

== Sweden and the naval war ==
=== Mining of the Oresund ===
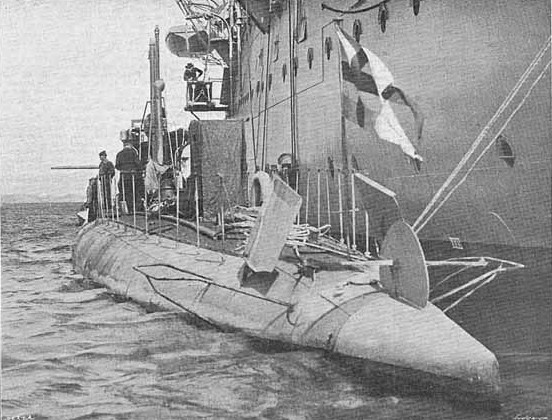
HSwMS Hvalen in 1912.

Throughout the war Germany applied pressure on Sweden and Denmark to close the channels connecting the Baltic sea to the (Allied-dominated) North Sea to Allied warships. Whilst Denmark had given into this pressure and mined the Danish Straits at the outbreak of the war, Sweden resisted demands that its side of the Øresund should be mined.

Eventually Germany relented in return for a promise that Sweden's lighthouses in the Øresund would be switched off and markers showing the way through the channel would be removed if the Royal Navy was sighted in the sound. When Royal Navy submarines entered the Baltic through the sound in October 1914, the Germans demanded that the Swedes carry out their promise.

In October 1915 British submarines operating in the Baltic successfully sank several German cargo ships as well as the armoured cruiser SMS Prinz Adalbert. A German warship opened fire on a Swedish submarine HSwMS Hvalen killing a member of the crew. According to the captain of the Hvalen, the submarine was flying the Swedish naval flag at the time and was sailing in Swedish home waters. Compensation was later paid to the widow of the crew-member and an apology was issued.

In the wake of these sinkings, Germany applied renewed pressure to the Swedes to lay mines in the Øresund channel, and laid mines within the four-mile-limit for territorial waters claimed by Sweden, but outside the three-mile-limit actively enforced by Sweden. Another concern was that British and French merchant ships, which had been stranded in the Baltic when war began, were being brought back to the UK and France via the Kogrund Channel (Kogundsrännan) running through the Øresund straits, which the Swedes believed might invite a German response. Sweden eventually mined the Kogrund Channel in a move announced on 28 July 1916, closing it to all but Swedish ships which would be led through the minefields by pilots.

The mining of the channel drew criticism from the Allied powers, causing them to describe Sweden as “neutral with reservations.” However the Swedes responded to this by stating that the Kogrund Channel had not been an international channel, having been dredged only to allow for the transit of Swedish cabotage, and as such was purely a domestic channel which had only gained international significance due to the acts of other powers, and that as a result the mining of the channel was purely a domestic matter.

=== Aftermath of the Battle of Jutland ===
In the aftermath of the Battle of Jutland, the bodies of both British and German sailors were washed ashore in Sweden. The Swedish authorities took care to collect these bodies and have them interred, British and Germans alike, on the island of Stensholmen. The most well known among these casualties was the German writer Gorch Fock (real name Johann Kinau), who was among the crew of the sunk light cruiser SMS Wiesbaden and whose body was found on the Swedish shore near Fjällbacka.

=== War-time iron-ore trade ===
Prior to the outbreak of war, the export of iron-ore had been a major business for Sweden. The iron-ore trade was run by an association in which the Swedish government was a member, and production of iron-ore for export was fixed at 22,500,000 tons for the period 1907–1938.

Iron mining in Sweden was not affected by the advent of war, production was maintained at 6–7 million tons throughout the war period. However, the destination of Sweden's exports of iron ore did change. The iron-ore fields of Gällivare, which in pre-war years produced on averaged 1,200,000 tons of iron-ore, most of which was shipped for export from the port of Luleå on the Baltic, could no longer export to the Allied countries and instead all of their produce went to Germany. In 1915 alone, Germany's demand for high-grade Swedish iron ore summed some 4 million tons.

By contrast, the iron-ore fields of Kiruna, whose produced was exported through the Norwegian port of Narvik via the North Sea and the Atlantic, became overwhelmingly dominated by exports to the allies, with only 5% of exports going to Germany whereas German exports had previously constituted 70%. The Swedish ships that did continue carrying iron-ore from Narvik to Germany avoided the British blockade by hugging the Norwegian coast and remaining in Norwegian waters as much as possible. British imports of Swedish iron ore totalled 5–600,000 tons annually during the war, in comparison the entire British national stock of iron ore in June 1916 had been 253,000 tons, highlighting British reliance on Swedish iron-ore exports.

== Late war period ==
=== Food shortages and downfall of Hjalmar Hammarskjöld ===
As a result of food shortages caused by the Allied blockade on imports, the sinking of Swedish ships during the German U-boat campaign, and also a bad harvest, by January 1917 the Swedish government had begun rationing of bread, sugar, and flour. The American entry into World War I on the side of Allies in April 1917 greatly increased the pressure on Sweden to conclude an agreement on trade and shipping favourable to the Allied powers. One specific request was that the Swedish reduce their iron-ore exports to Germany in return for increased supplies of food from the Allies.

Despite the food shortage, Hjalmar Hammarskjöld had continued to resist an agreement that might loosen the blockade in return for reducing exports to Germany due to fear of angering the Germans and being seen as favouring the Allies. Hammarskjöld had also come into conflict with his foreign minister Knut Wallenberg over a mooted trade agreement with Britain and a defence co-operation agreement with Norway. Hammarskjöld's refusal to negotiate trade agreements with the Entente countries resulted in unrest in Sweden. Hammarskjöld's government also became weakened around this time when the "Luxburg Affair", involving Swedish facilities being used to transmit secret messages targeting allied shipping for the Germans, became known.

Angered by Hammarskjöld's rejection of trade with the Entente, Hammarskjöld's allies in the Swedish parliament rebelled against him. In early 1917, a combination of protests over food shortages and the failure of the Riksdag to approve increased defence spending, forced Hammarskjöld to resign. King Gustaf called on the conservative Ernst Trygger to form a government, however he lacked the necessary support in the Riksdag to do so, so he was instead replaced by Carl Swartz in March 1917.

The replacement of Hammarskjöld by Swartz did not prevent further disturbances, which were inflamed by heavy-handed policing of so-called "hunger marches". Nor did the food situation in Sweden improve, as rationing was extended to include potatoes. In May 1917 disturbances hit the island of Seskarö in northern Sweden, where fighting broke out between the local population and the military in which the police had to intervene. The island was only pacified after a shipment of food reached the island and a number of local men were jailed.

The largest disturbance occurred on 5 June 1917, when 20,000 people assembled near the Riksdag in Stockholm to hear the response of Carl Swartz to a request from Hjalmar Branting to introduce universal suffrage and constitutional reform, and were dispersed by mounted police.

Swartz served as Swedish prime minister for only seven months before being forced from power after the Swedish elections of 1917 and replaced by the liberal government of Nils Edén. Following Edén's election disturbances subsided as the social-democrats stopped supporting them, though demands for reforms, including an 8-hour day and improved living conditions, continued. However, it was not until 29 May 1918 that the British blockade of trade with Sweden was completely lifted. The sinking of Swedish ships by German U-boats continued until the end of the war and were eventually to total 280 ships with a loss of 800 lives.

=== Swedish occupation of the Åland Islands ===
During late 1917, as the German army advanced on the Russian capital of St. Petersburg, Richard von Kühlmann, the new German Secretary of State for Foreign Affairs, renewed Germany's offer to champion Swedish sovereignty over Åland in return for increased support for the German war effort from Sweden that included increased iron-ore exports. Germany's support for Sweden's claim under this proposal would take the form of either occupying the islands and then handing them over to Sweden, or negotiating for their transfer to Sweden in the upcoming peace talks.

With the declaration of Finnish independence on 6 December 1917, and Sweden's recognition of Finland without reservation on 4 January 1918, the situation became even more complex. Whilst the Åland islands were linguistically Swedish, and 95% of voters had voted for Swedish annexation in a referendum, the Finns claimed the islands as a historical part of the Grand Duchy of Finland.

Knowing that King Gustaf favoured the annexation of the Åland islands to Sweden, von Kühlmann approached King Gustaf with them in secret on 11 November and 17 December 1917. Both King Gustaf and the Swedish government reacted cautiously to these overtures, responding on 23 December with letters to Austria, Turkey, and Germany requesting only that Sweden's interest in the islands be safeguarded, and proposing neutralisation of the islands as the best solution.

This situation changed, however, when, on 13 February 1918, exaggerated reports of atrocities committed on the Åland islands by Russian soldiers prompted the Swedish government to launch a military expedition to the islands. The Swedish army deployed to the islands and a stand-off ensued with the Russian garrison. A week later Germany, acting in response to a request for support from the Finnish Whites who also claimed the islands, informed the Swedes that they intended to occupy the islands and that Swedish forces were to leave immediately. A German force landed and took the Russian garrison prisoner as they were about to leave. Eventually an agreement was reached for a joint German-Swedish occupation of the islands that lasted until 25 April 1918, when Swedish forces eventually withdrew in the face of Finnish protests.

=== Sweden and the Finnish Civil War ===
With the outbreak of the Finnish Civil War between the communist "Reds" and the nationalist-democratic "Whites", steps were taken by various actors within Sweden assist the cause of the Whites. The organisation Finlands vänner (Friends of Finland) was formed in January 1918 with financing from the Swedish business sector to provide support and recruits to the White armies. In addition to this, approximately 1,100 Swedes volunteered for service with the White forces, of whom roughly 500 saw combat. These volunteers included officers of the Swedish army.

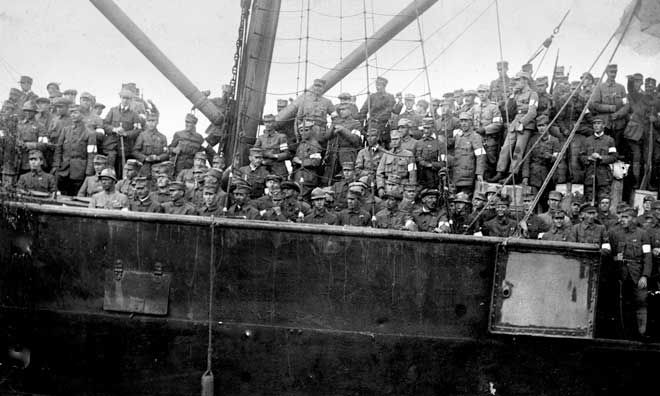
Men of the Swedish Brigade returning to Sweden in 1918

The largest group of Swedish volunteers that served with the White army was a roughly 350-strong unit dubbed the "Swedish Brigade". Whilst this unit was kept in reserve for much of the war, it was deployed at the decisive battle of Tampere. It was at Tampere that the Swedish Brigade suffered its first casualty (a right-wing historian by the name of Olof Palme), and their casualties in the taking of the city went on to be heavy. The Swedish Brigade suffered 34 men killed and 50 wounded in the battle. Sweden also provided a group of six aeroplanes that was to provide the leader of the Finnish Whites, Marshal Mannerheim, with valuable intelligence. Swedish support for the Whites also included financial support from Swedish business interests, and military munitions which were delivered by Swedish warships. Medical and veterinary support was also provided.

In terms of support for the Reds in Swedish society, even though Sweden's new social-democratic/liberal government was towards the left side of the political spectrum, social-democratic/liberal politicians like Hjalmar Branting and Johannes Hellner were sympathetic to the Whites as they were seen as the legitimate government and the Reds were seen, in contrast, as undemocratic and too close to communist Russia. Few Swedes volunteered to serve with the Reds and there was little support for them until close to the end of the war, when reports of poor treatment of captured Reds prompted calls in Politiken (a left-wing news paper) to support them.

== Aftermath ==
=== Cultural and societal impact ===
During the war, a number of antiwar authors had risen to prominence within Sweden. These included Elin Wägner, Anna Lenah Elgström, Selma Lagerlöf and Marika Stiernstedt. Swedish poets, including Karl Gustav Ossiannilsson, Bertil Malmberg, and Ture Nerman used the medium of war-poetry to explore various themes.

During the war the Swedish media had been divided into a number of differing camps depending on their position on the war. The large conservative outlets, including Svenska Dagbladet, Aftonbladet (which was majority-owned by German interests), and Nya Dagligt Allehanda had been broadly pro-German. Left/liberal-leaning newspapers such as Dagens Nyheter, on the other hand, were more pro-allied. Finally, Stockholms-Tidningen, Sweden's largest news paper at the time, was relatively neutral and pro-government.

The rise to power of social-democratic politicians also permanently altered the Swedish political landscape, as many aspects of Liberal policy were implemented, and universal suffrage was accepted.

=== Treaty of Versailles and German postwar re-armament ===
Sweden was not a signatory of the Treaty of Versailles, which brought the war to an end, but the Swedish diplomat Marcus Wallenberg (senior), the half-brother of Knut Wallenberg, took part in negotiations at Versailles in relation to Swedish assets in Germany. However, in 1920, Sweden joined the League of Nations, which was formed as a result of the treaty, and so was bound by its restriction of German rearmament.

Despite the Versailles restrictions, Swedish firms provided assistance to German counterparts that helped them avoid the restrictions of the treaty, ultimately aiding the rearmament efforts of Nazi Germany before the Second World War. The assistance included assembling Junkers military aircraft and manufacturing artillery weapons for Rheinmetall.

== See also ==
- Swedish intervention in Persia
- Sweden during World War II
- Seskarö Uprising
