= Kalliohasu =

Island in the country of Sweden

Coordinates: 65°47′28″N 23°56′56″E

Kalliohasu is a Swedish island belonging to the Haparanda archipelago. The island is located near Nikkala. It has no shore connection and no buildings.
