= Koijukari =

Island in the Haparanda archipelago, Sweden

Koijukari is a Swedish island (65°48′N 23°43′E) located in Norrbotten, Sweden, belongs to the Haparanda archipelago. The island lies in the south of the Säivisviken, 2,5 kilometres south-east of Säivis. The island has no connection to the mainland, and there are no buildings on it.

== See also ==
- List of islands of the Haparanda archipelago
