= Finnrevet =

Lighthouse in Sweden

Finnrevet lighthouse Finnrevet
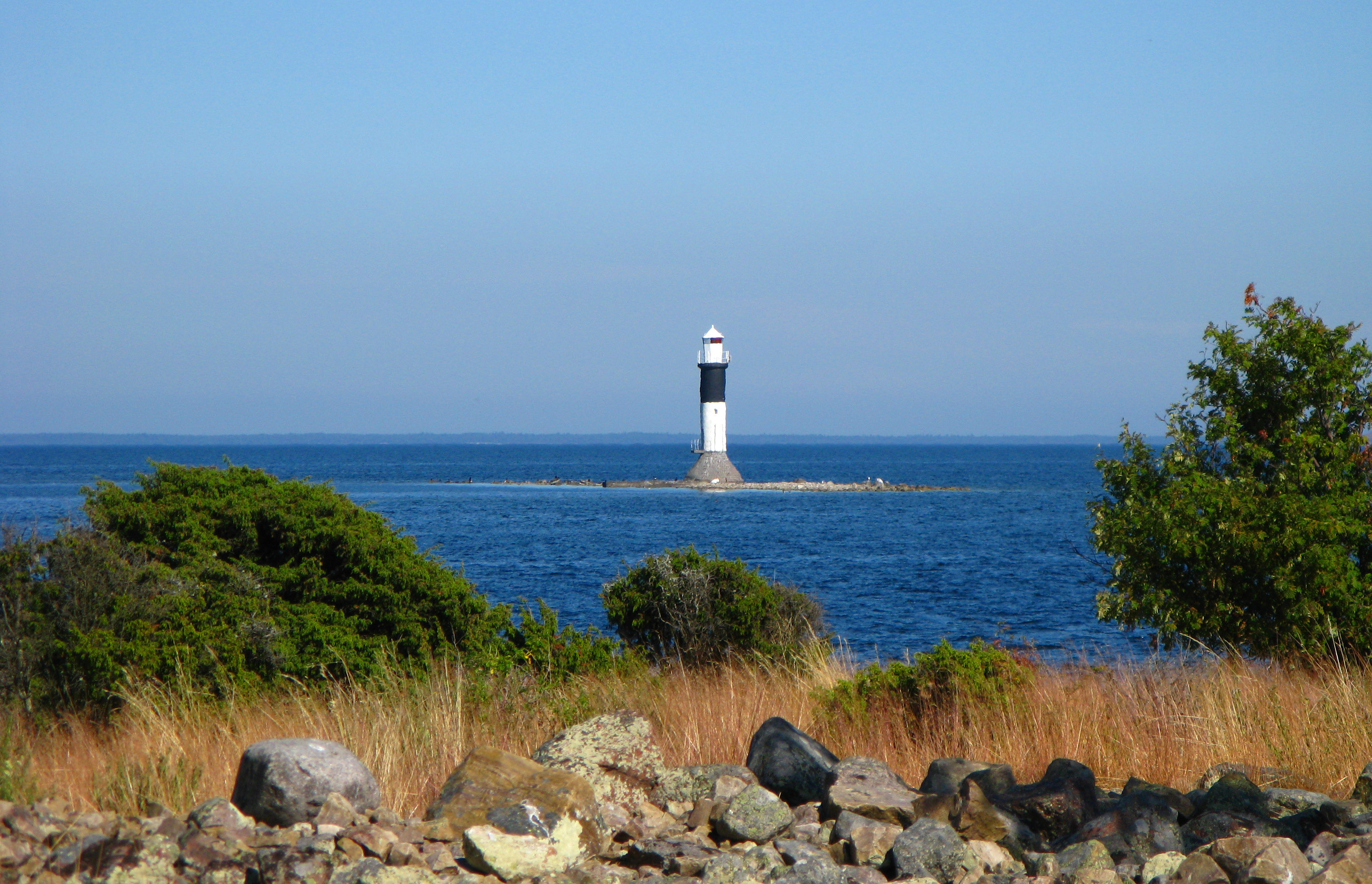
- Finnrevet Lighthouse
- Location: 5 nmi (9.3 km) east of Oskarshamn; Kalmar County; Sweden
- Coordinates: 57.276745°N 16.634482°E

Tower
- Constructed: 1921
- Foundation: concrete base
- Construction: cast iron
- Height: 14.5 m (48 ft)
- Shape: cylindrical tower with balcony and lantern
- Markings: White and black
- Operator: Swedish Maritime Administration (Sjöfartsverket)

Light
- Focal height: 15.5 m (51 ft)
- Lens: fifth order Fresnel lens
- Range: 16 nmi (30 km; 18 mi)
- Characteristic: Fl (2) W 6s.

Finnrevet is a Swedish lighthouse located on a shoal about 5 nautical miles (9 kilometres) outside Oskarshamn in Europe.

== General information ==
The lighthouse was built in 1921 and is located on a reef just east of island Furö. The black and white tower is about 15.5 metres (51 ft) high. The light can be seen at a distance of 16 nmi (30 km).

== Wrecks near Finnrevet ==
The waters around island Furön are shallow and many ships have run aground in the area near the lighthouse.

Shipwrecks in the area:

- Schooner Charlotta wrecked east of Finnrevet 17 May 1882 in a northern gale.
- Russian schooner Lotus av Libau ran aground here in 1898.
- S/S Britkon, cargoship, built 1917 in Sunderland, beached at Finnrevet in November 1949. The steamship had a length of 109 meters, and broke in half after about one month grounded at the reef. The 37 men-crew were rescued by maritime pilots stationed on the nearby island Furön.
- The Hans Olof was a Swedish ship grounded at the reef in due to a sudden north-eastern gale in 1950.
- M/S Priwall, West German flagged cargoship beached at Finnrevet 1 February 1968 loaded with wooden goods.

== See also ==
- List of lighthouses and lightvessels in Sweden
