= Sarvenkataja =

Island in the Haparanda archipelago, Sweden

Coordinates: 65°37′13″N 24°08′33″E

Sarvenkataja is a Swedish island belonging to the Haparanda archipelago. The island lies 23 kilometres south of Haparanda. The island has no connection to the main land and except a single house there are no buildings. On Sarvenkataja, Primula nutans and Moehringia lateriflora grow. Sarvenkataja is part of Natura 2000.
