= Skratten =

Island in the country of Sweden

Coordinates: 65°46′47″N 23°58′38″E

Skratten is a Swedish island belonging to the Haparanda archipelago. The island is located southeast of island of Vasikkasaari. It has no shore connection and has no buildings.
