= Harrinkrunni =

Island in the country of Sweden

Coordinates: 65°41′34″N 23°51′56″E

Harrinkrunni is a Swedish island belonging to the Haparanda archipelago. The island is located 13 kilometres south of the town Haparanda. The island has no shore connection and no buildings.
