= Tantamanni =

Island in Sweden

Coordinates: 65.609°N 23.917°E

Tantamanni is a Swedish island belonging to the Haparanda archipelago. The island is located 27 kilometers south of the town Haparanda. The island has no shore connection. Tantamanni is an island that consists partly of sandy beaches, partly of mudflat and partly of a wooded area. Two-thirds of the island is part of Natura 2000 because of the antiquity of its forests.
