= Katajankrunni =

Coordinates: 65°43′06″N 24°08′36″E

Katajankrunni is a Swedish rock formation or shoal belonging to the Haparanda archipelago. The island is located 14 kilometres south of the town Haparanda. The island has no shore connection and is unbuilt.
