= Haparanda Archipelago National Park =

National park in Haparanda Municipality, Norrbotten County, Sweden

- Haparanda skärgårds nationalpark
- IUCN category II (national park)
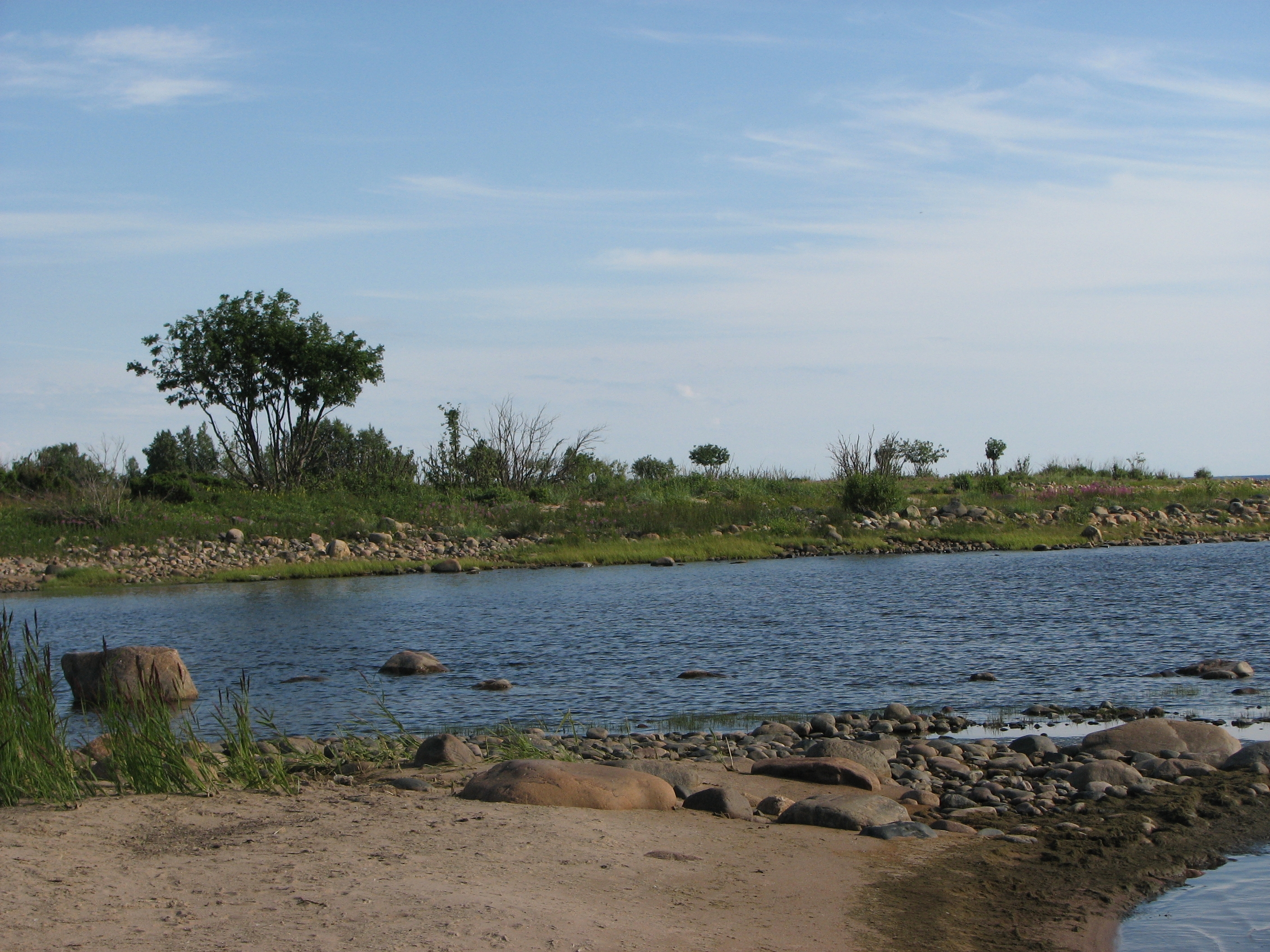
- Landscape of Sandskär island
- Interactive map of Haparanda Archipelago National Park
- Location: Norrbotten County, Sweden
- Nearest city: Haparanda, Haparanda Municipality
- Coordinates: 65°34′N 23°44′E
- Area: 60 km^{2} (23 sq mi)
- Established: 1995
- Governing body: Naturvårdsverket

Haparanda Archipelago National Park (Swedish: Haparanda skärgårds nationalpark) is a national park in Haparanda Municipality, Norrbotten County, Sweden.

The park covers part of the Haparanda archipelago in the northeast of the Bothnian Bay near the border with Finland. There are two relatively large islands, Sandskär and Seskar Furö, and several smaller islands and reefs. The park is to the west of the Finnish Perämeri National Park.

All of the islands in the Haparanda archipelago have emerged in the last 1,500 years or so, as the bed of the bay has risen due to post-glacial rebound following the last ice age. The land continues to rise at about 8.5 millimetres (0.33 in) per year, so the islands are steadily expanding. The water surrounding the islands is shallow, making it difficult to land. The islands are typified by large dunes.

National parks of Sweden (clickable map)
