= Marielund, Haparanda =

Marielund
- Location within Norrbotten Location within Sweden
- Coordinates: 65°50′N 24°07′E
- Country: Sweden
- Province: Norrbotten
- County: Norrbotten County
- Municipality: Haparanda Municipality

Area
  - Total: 1.17 km^{2} (0.45 sq mi)

Population (31 December 2010)
  - Total: 1,726
  - Density: 1,478/km^{2} (3,830/sq mi)
- Time zone: UTC+1 (CET)
  - Summer (DST): UTC+2 (CEST)

Marielund is a locality situated in Haparanda Municipality, Norrbotten County, Sweden with 1,726 inhabitants in 2010. It was built as a suburb to Haparanda in the 1970s and then got the name Mattila after a small village in the neighbourhood. To avoid confusion, the name was changed to the current one in the 1980s.
