= Tallrikarna =

Island in the country of Sweden

Coordinates: 65°46′23″N 24°03′23″E

Tallrikarna is a Swedish island belonging to the Haparanda archipelago. It is located south of the Finnish island Kraaseli. It has no shore connection.
