= Seskarö Uprising =

Part of the Swedish hunger riots of 1917

- Part of the Swedish hunger riots of 1917
Date	May – June, 1917
Location	Seskarö, Sweden
Result	Government victory

Belligerents
Sweden	Seskarö Republic

Commanders and leaders
Wenzel Falk; Erik Grafström; Captain Ringström; Gustaf Hårleman	

Units involved
Västernorrland Regiment; Norrbotten Regiment; Swedish Police; Swedish Navy	

Strength
Several policemen 550 soldiers 1 Destroyer; 3 Steamers; 1 Icebreaker; 1 Cannon	+1,000

Casualties and losses
Unknown	Unknown

As a consequence of the 1917 food shortage in Sweden, the residents of Seskarö went against the authority of the Swedish government by forcibly purchasing bread from local bakeries when the supplies from the mainland failed to reach demand. Later attempts by authorities to put the perpetrators of these forced purchases to justice sparked a confrontation with the Seskarö residents resulting in a temporary expulsion of all government power from the island by May 30. However, later reinforcements from the Norbotten regiment once again put Seskarö in government hands in June.

== Background ==
Although hunger was a nationwide problem in Sweden in 1917, the situation on Seskarö was especially poor. The remote island of Seskarö was cut off from the mainland by a thick layer of ice that greatly decreased the already limited amount of supplies arriving from Sweden. The small number of provisions that were sent to the starving islanders was mostly rotten food that was just enough for 3-5 kg of potatoes per person as well as 2000 kg of turnips. This lack of supplies resulted in the Seskarö residents holding a meeting at Folkets hus (the people's house) on May 25, where the situation was discussed. The course of action eventually agreed upon was forcibly purchasing bread from the local bakeries. There was already much disdain towards the local bakers on the island as many believed that they were selling their bread on the black market for a higher price rather than giving it to their fellow islanders.

The next day, the baker Eriksson alerted the authorities of the forced purchases which were committed by around 300 residents.

== Uprising ==
=== Law enforcement arrives ===
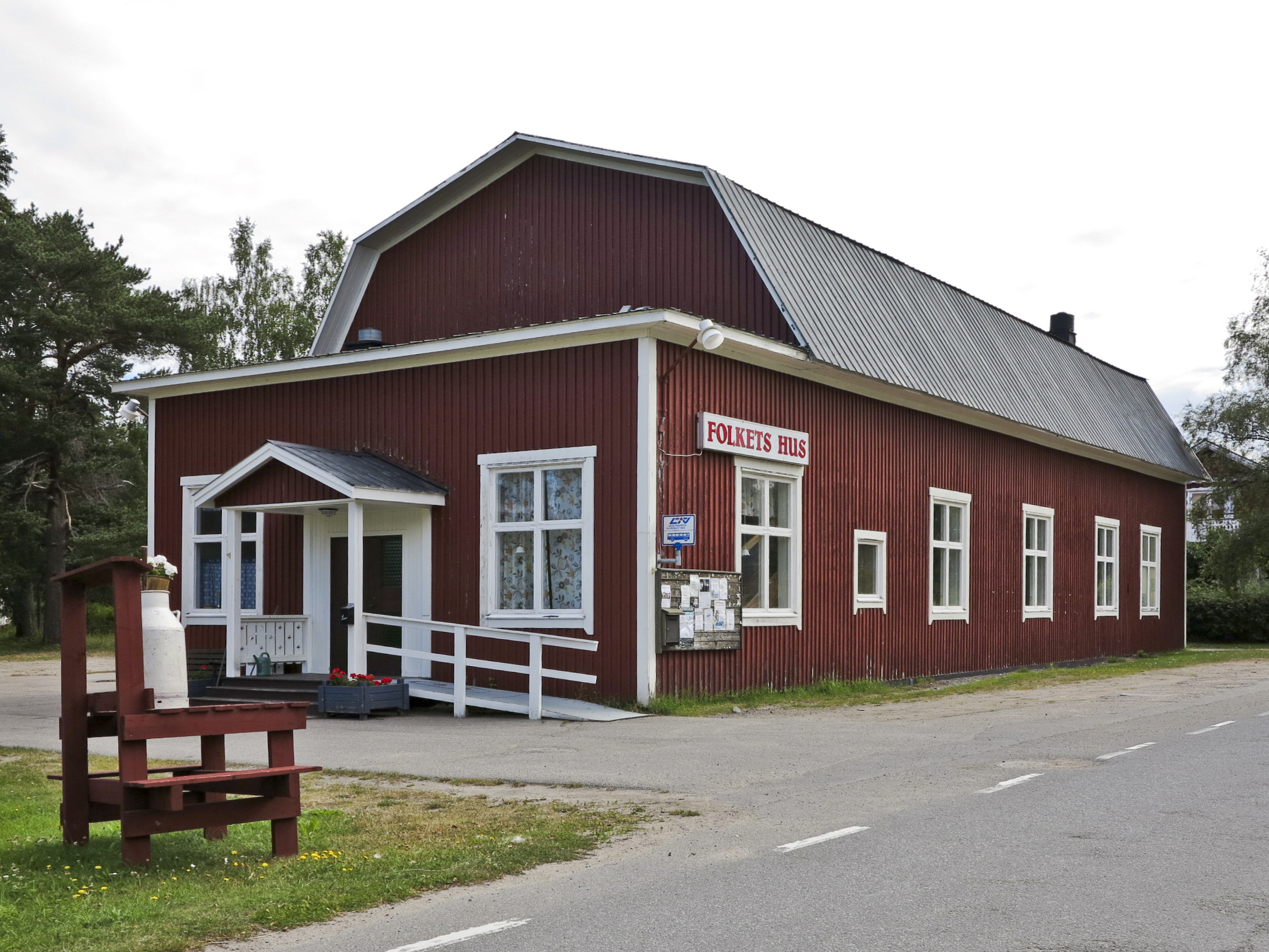
Folkets Hus in Seskarö

On May 28, only 4 out of the 300 involved in the forced purchases were called in for questioning by the recently arrived sheriffs because Eriksson was only able to point out 16 perpetrators and the sheriffs lacked the resources to punish such a large number of people. The Seskarö refused to let their countrymen be arrested as scapegoats and helped the arrested out of the building where they were interrogated, simultaneously locking in two sheriffs present. The hostilities the sheriffs faced, coupled with threats of a strike from the workers at the local sawmill, forced them to leave the island.

The next day, the sheriffs return accompanied by the county detective and the bailiff. Fearing that only a few scapegoats would be picked out for questioning again, the islanders gave the authorities a list of all who had admitted to being involved in the forced purchases. The names on the list were arranged in a circle to prevent any one name from looking more guilty than the other. However, the authorities dismissed the list and continued to demand that they choose who would be interrogated. In a discussion with the authorities, the Seskarö residents made clear to that the authorities' demands would not be met and that the authorities could do little against them. The authorities then determined that the best course of action to subdue the Seskarö residents was to deploy the military.

=== Military escalation ===
During the early hours of May 30, 50 soldiers out of the Västernorrland Regiment under Captain Wenzel Falk arrived to Seskarö. The islanders again held a meeting at Folkets house in which they discussed how to respond to the military presence. At 12:00, the suspects were again called in for questioning; the interrogations took place at Eriksson's bakery, which was guarded by the armed soldiers of the Västernorrland regiment. Meanwhile, a large crowd of 1000 islanders, consisting of men, women, and children alike, had gathered around the bakery throughout the afternoon. The islanders were very loud and disruptive, even playing Arbetets Söner (a Swedish worker's song) on a gramophone while demanding that their countrymen be released. Attempts by the authorities to make the islanders quiet down were ignored until, eventually, the crowd got so loud and rowdy that the authorities could not continue with their interrogations. The bailiff read out the riot act to the islanders and demanded that they disperse on three different occasions. Upon being ignored, the bailiff determined that the use of the military against the islanders was now justified. However, before the military could engage, the islanders charged them. Accounts of what happens next vary, with some stating that the soldiers willingly gave up their weapons and others stating that their weapons were forcibly taken away from them. With the military unit unarmed, they had no other choice than to retreat to the mainland. They had lost 24 rifles and 2 revolvers. Ten soldiers had been injured from the ensuing fire from the insurgents, and one had been shot accidentally by another soldier. Two islanders were injured, both having been shot by Captain Wenzel Falk before he was disarmed and forced to flee to the mainland under fire. The islanders spent the following night celebrating their victory.

=== Invasion of Seskarö ===
In the early hours of May 31, the military once more tried to quell the uprising on Seskarö, but this time with a more capable force out of the Norrbotten Regiment. Although somewhat hindered by an uncooperating crew and their icebreaker running aground, the military managed to land some 500 soldiers on Seskarö throughout the day. Under Erik Grafström and later also by Ringström, the military managed to take over several of the insurgent fortifications and was now besieging the island with the help of the Navy. By now, the whole island was occupied by Swedish forces.

== Military occupation ==
On June 1, the whole island had returned to government control. It was decided that no one was to be allowed to enter or leave Seskarö. To enforce this, the occupation force extensively monitored the civilian population, erecting several cannon-enforced fortifications beside the piers on the island along with frequent patrols by the navy. All the boats on Seskarö were confiscated by the government and phone calls in and out of the island were censored by the government. However, the occupation would only last until June 3 when, after hearing about the situation on Seskarö, the popular governor Walter Murray arrived with an abundance of food. He brought the bailiff and the islanders to Folkets hus to discuss the recent events. Now that he was well informed about the uprising, he ordered the military back to the mainland and that a food council be formed to prevent future starvation. He also promised that the islander's punishments would be mild if they agreed to be calmer in the future and return the guns that they stole from the Västernorrland Regiment.

== Aftermath ==
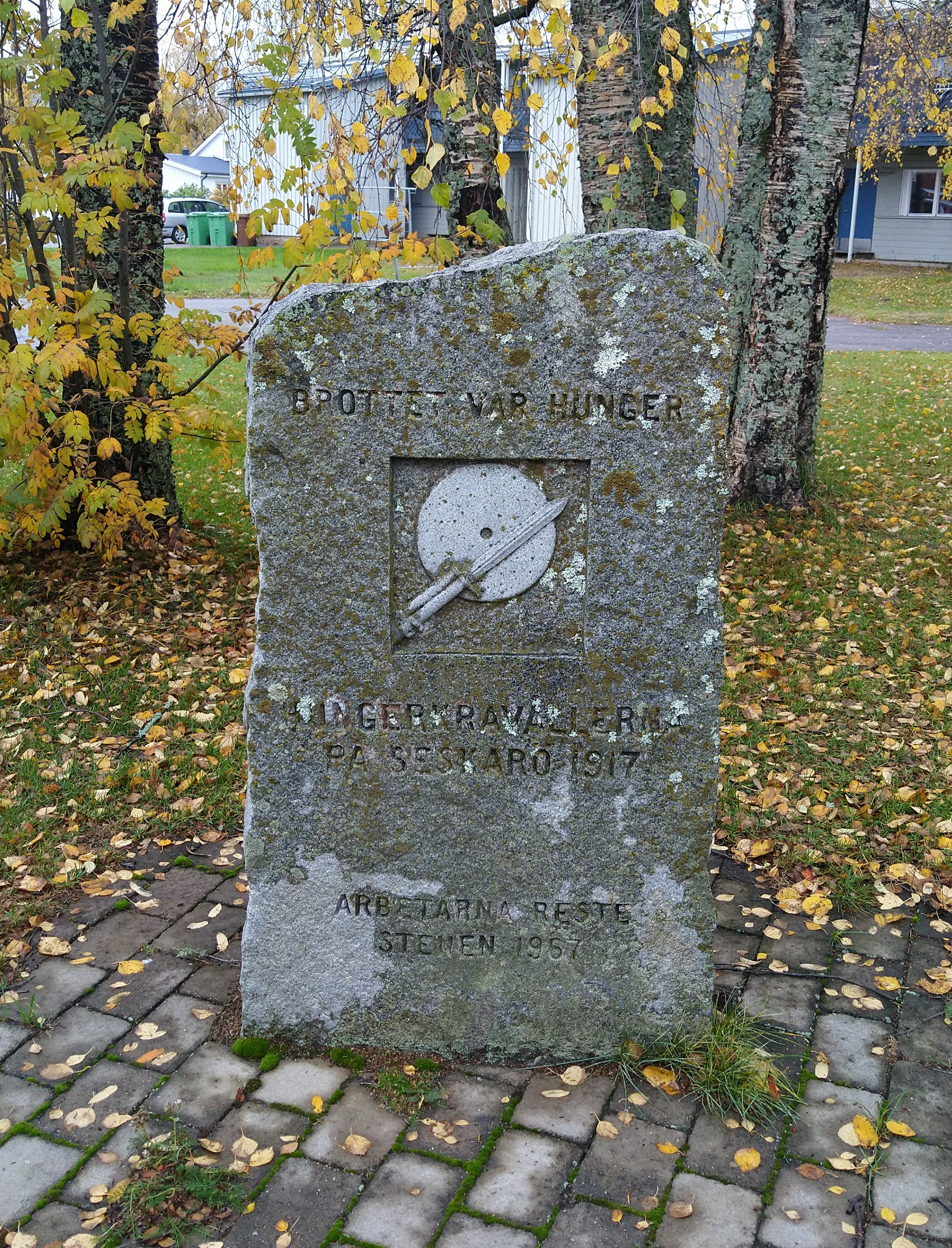
Memorial erected in the center of Seskarö village in 1967 (65°44′17.9″N 23°44′20.8″E)

The authority's response to the uprising received heavy backlash from the public and the press, with some even attempting to rise up in solidarity with the islanders. Due to the public sympathies towards the Seskarö islanders, 3087 sek in legal aid were donated towards those who were to face the law with an additional 2000 sek from the Sawmill Industry Workers Union. However, only around 10 people would see jail time.

== See also ==
- Tullberg Uprising
