= Hanhinkari =

Island in the Haparanda archipelago, Sweden

- Location within Sweden

Geography
- Coordinates: 65.76375°N 24.049108°E
- Adjacent to: Bay of Bothnia

Administration
- Sweden
- County: Norrbotten
- Municipality: Haparanda

Hanhinkari is an island in the northeast of the Swedish sector of the Bothnian Bay, in the Haparanda archipelago.

== Location ==
Hanhinkari lies in the Haparanda archipelago, the part of the Norrbotten archipelago that is included in the Haparanda Municipality. All the islands in the Haparanda archipelago have emerged in the last 1,500 years or so, as the bed of the bay has risen due to post-glacial rebound following the last ice age. Hanhinkari lies offshore from the mouth of the Torne River, which forms the boundary between Sweden and Finland. It is about 10 kilometres (6.2 mi) from Haparanda and 6 miles (9.7 km) from the mainland. The major shipping lane leading to Kemi, Finland, passes Hanhinkari. It is northwest of the island of Katajavuori, the easternmost point in Sweden.

== Visitor facilities ==
Hanhinkari is the most visited of the islands in the archipelago, with about 50 summer houses. The harbor is 1.7 metres (5 ft 7 in) deep. There is a walking trail that leads around the island. The Haparanda boat club has its clubhouse on the island, open to all visitors in the summer, as is the sauna. There are two barbecue areas beside the clubhouse. There is a floating dock by the clubhouse and another, larger, dock nearby. Wells provide water. There are two stone labyrinths.
