= Vähä Lehtikari =

Island in the Haparanda archipelago, Sweden

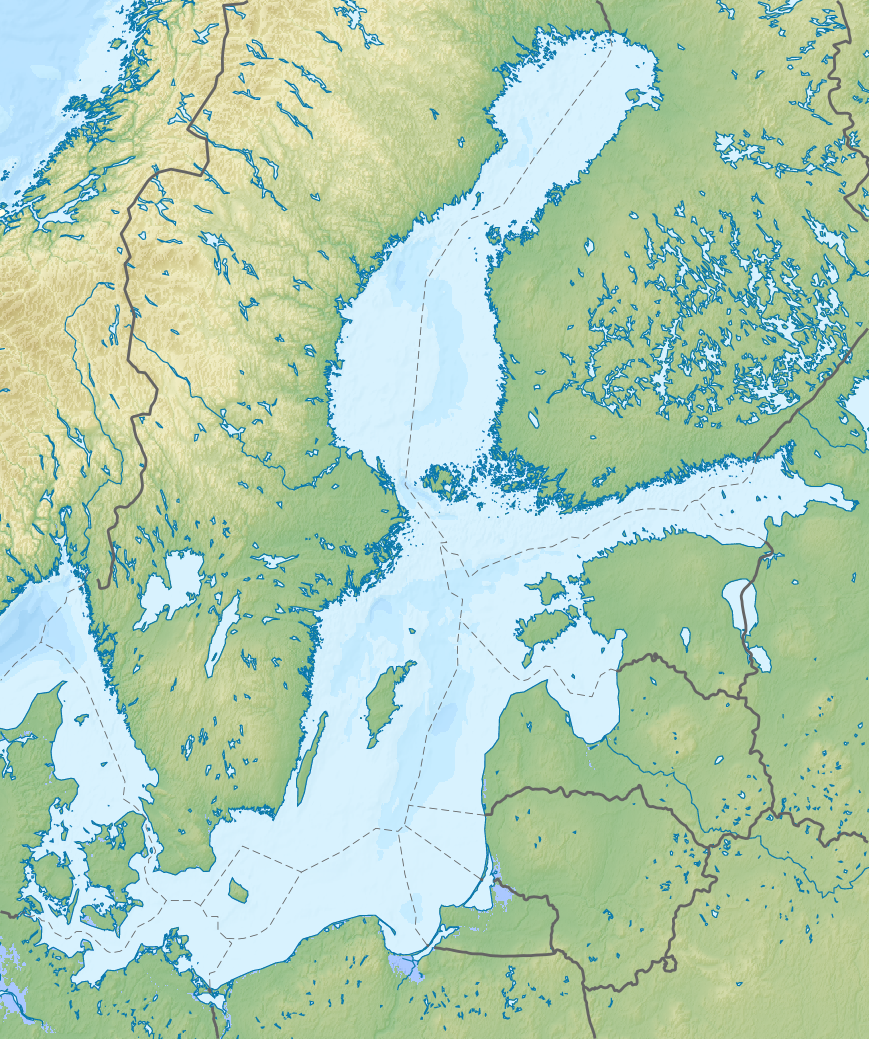
- Location within Sweden Location within Baltic Sea
- Interactive map of Vähä Lehtikari

Geography
- Coordinates: 65°46′29″N 23°40′50″E

Administration
- Sweden
- Province: Norrbotten County

Demographics
- Population: Uninhabited

Vähä Lehtikari is a Swedish island belonging to the Haparanda archipelago. Together with Iso Lehtikari and Pikku Lehtikari the island is an extension of the northeastern tip of Seskarö. The island has no shore connection and is except for a few summer houses unbuilt. It is attached to Iso Lehtikari by a sand strip.
