= Stora Hepokari =

Island in the country of Sweden

- Location within Sweden

Geography
- Coordinates: 65.607609°N 24.031831°E
- Adjacent to: Bay of Bothnia

Administration
- Sweden
- County: Norrbotten
- Municipality: Haparanda

Stora Hepokari is an island in the northeast of the Swedish sector of the Bothnian Bay, in the Haparanda archipelago.

== Location ==
Stora Hepokari lies in the Haparanda archipelago, the part of the Norrbotten archipelago that is included in the Haparanda Municipality. Stora Hepokari is in the outer part of the archipelago, about 5 kilometres (3.1 mi) from the border with Finland. All of the islands in the Haparanda archipelago have emerged in the last 1,500 years or so, as the bed of the bay has risen due to post-glacial rebound following the last ice age.

== Description ==
Stora Hepokari is about 185.3 hectares (458 acres) in size. The island is rich in archaeological remains, including the ruins of a fishing village, with mounds for drying nets and a maze. The island contains rocky areas and open meadows as well as deciduous trees and bushes.

== Siberian Primrose ==
The island has been chosen for inclusion in Natura 2000 because it is abundant in Siberian Primrose (Primula nutans), a species listed in the Habitats directive. The goal is to maintain at least 60,000 specimens of the plant. The main danger facing the plants is exploitation of the beaches by humans. The Siberian Primrose is red-listed in the Near Threatened category in Sweden. The plant grows in meadows and boulder beaches. The environment on Stora Hepokari is unstable, because uplift eliminates suitable terrain while new areas appear. The plant's seeds are wind-dispersed, but may also be carried by water.
