= Pensaskari =

Island in the country of Sweden

Coordinates: 65°46′N 23°59′E

Pensaskari is an island of the Haparanda archipelago in Sweden. The island is located south of Vasikkasaari. It has no shore connection and has no buildings.
