= Torne-Furö =

Island in the country of Sweden

- Location within Sweden

Geography
- Coordinates: 65.749829°N 24.066961°E
- Adjacent to: Bay of Bothnia

Administration
- Sweden
- County: Norrbotten
- Municipality: Haparanda

Torne-Furö is an island in the northeast of the Swedish sector of the Bothnian Bay, in the Haparanda archipelago.

== Location ==
Torne-Furö lies in the Haparanda archipelago, the part of the Norrbotten archipelago that is included in the Haparanda Municipality. All of the islands in the Haparanda archipelago have emerged in the last 1,500 years or so, as the bed of the bay has risen due to post-glacial rebound following the last ice age. The island is about 8 kilometres (5.0 mi) from the port of Nikkala and 10 kilometres (6.2 mi) southwest of Haparanda.

== Description ==
The north-eastern tip of the island is surrounded by beautiful beaches. Bathing from these beaches can be dangerous, since in places the sea suddenly becomes deep, and several drownings have occurred. The southern and eastern sides of the island are dominated by boulder beaches.

The island is a popular destination for excursions to the islands of the region. There are fireplaces in the northern cape, and a year-round cabin provides shelter. The woodshed contains firewood. Visitors can camp and make fires in designated areas, hike and pick berries and mushrooms. They are not allowed to harm plant or animal life.

== Environment ==
The Torne-Furö nature reserve consists of the island of Torne Furö and the small islet of Vassika. Torne-Furö is thinly wooded, mostly with pines, although vegetation is richer in the wetter southwest of the island. The forest is fringed with deciduous species such as alder, rowan, willow and birch. There are many birds including the common tern, tern, black woodpecker, Eurasian three-toed woodpecker, pygmy owl, boreal owl and black grouse. Torne-Furö is included in the European Union's Natura 2000 network of protected areas. The western cape forms a peninsula with lush and biologically diverse meadows and deciduous brushwood.
