= Oskarshamn archipelago =

Coordinates: 57°13.122′N 16°29.598′E

Oskarshamn archipelago is a cluster of island and islets in the Baltic Sea, located in the south-east of Sweden in Oskarshamn Municipality.

== General description ==
The archipelago extends roughly 55 kilometers in a north–south direction, with a chain of islands along the coastline of Småland. The archipelago consists of approximately 5,500 islands and islets. Most of the islands consist of granite rock. The bedrock has been shaped and smoothed by the glaciers at the end of the last ice age, about 11,000 years ago. The largest island named Runnö is located in the south part of the archipelago. Other larger islands are Blå Jungfrun (national park), Furö, Storö, Ekö and Vinö.

== Boat travelling ==
There are tourist boats which cruise the waters of Oskarshamn archipelago. There are also five guest harbours for leisure boating, for example in Oskarshamn and in Figeholm as well as natural harbours on many of the islands.

== Gallery ==
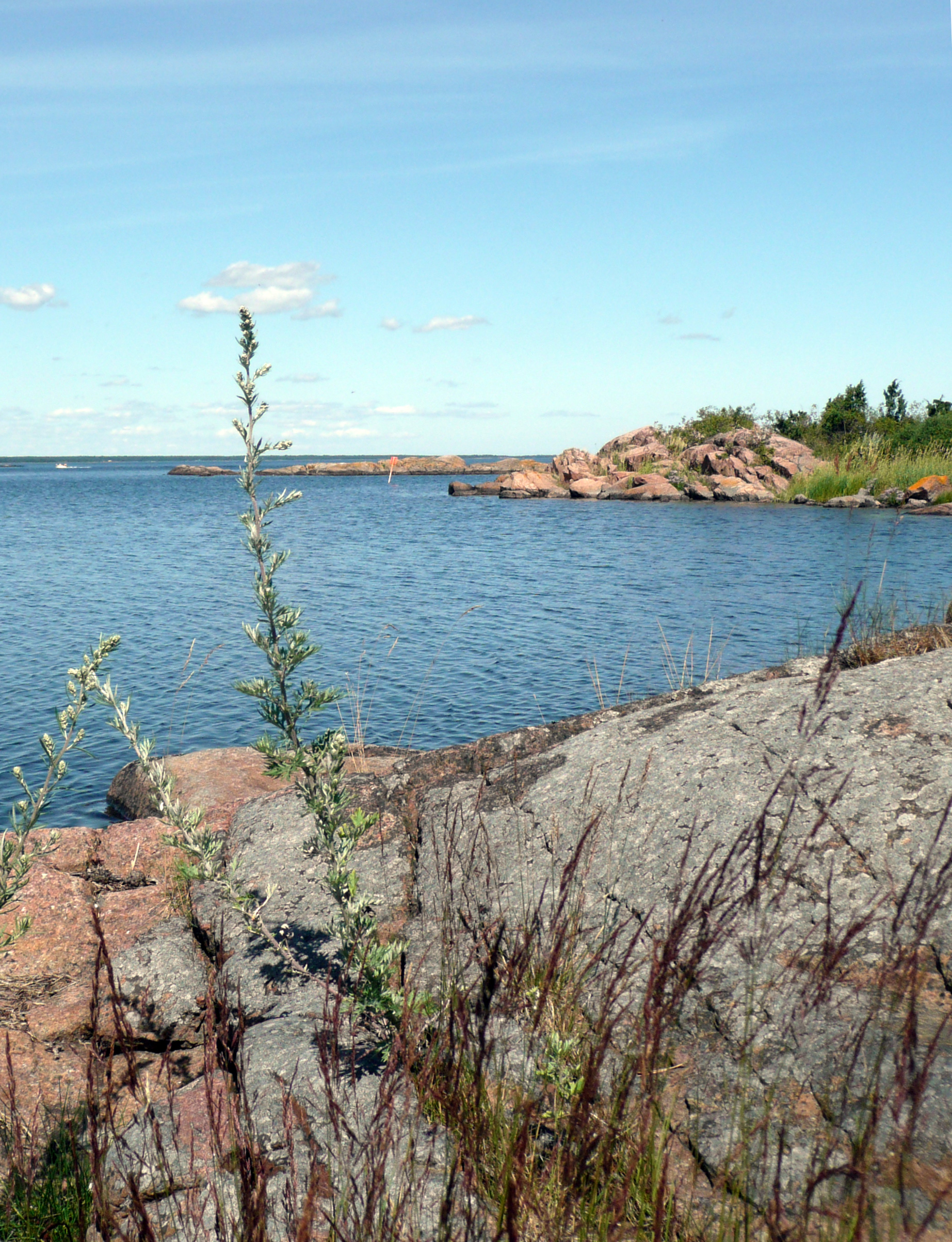
Island outside Oskarshamn.

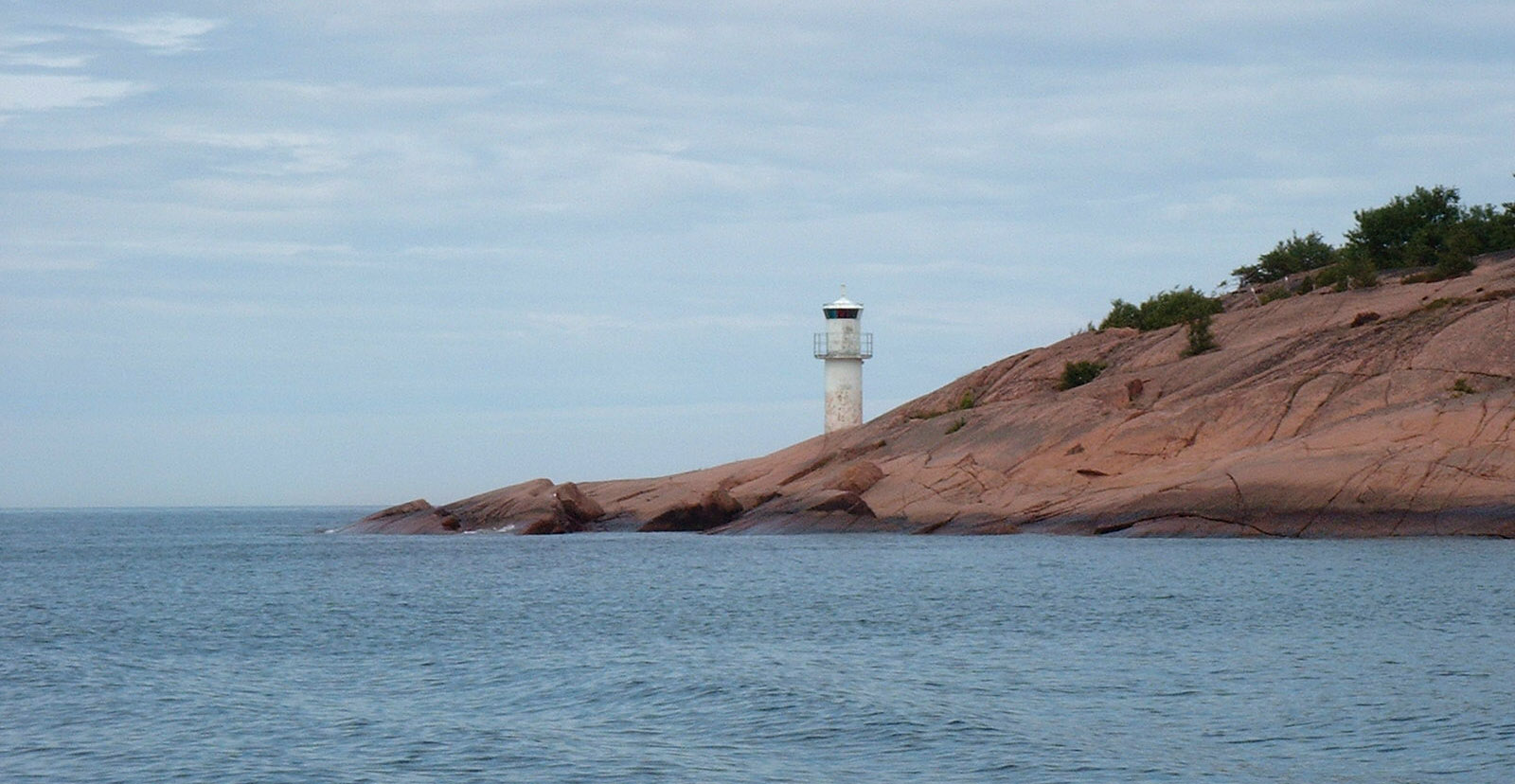
Blå Jungfrun National Park.

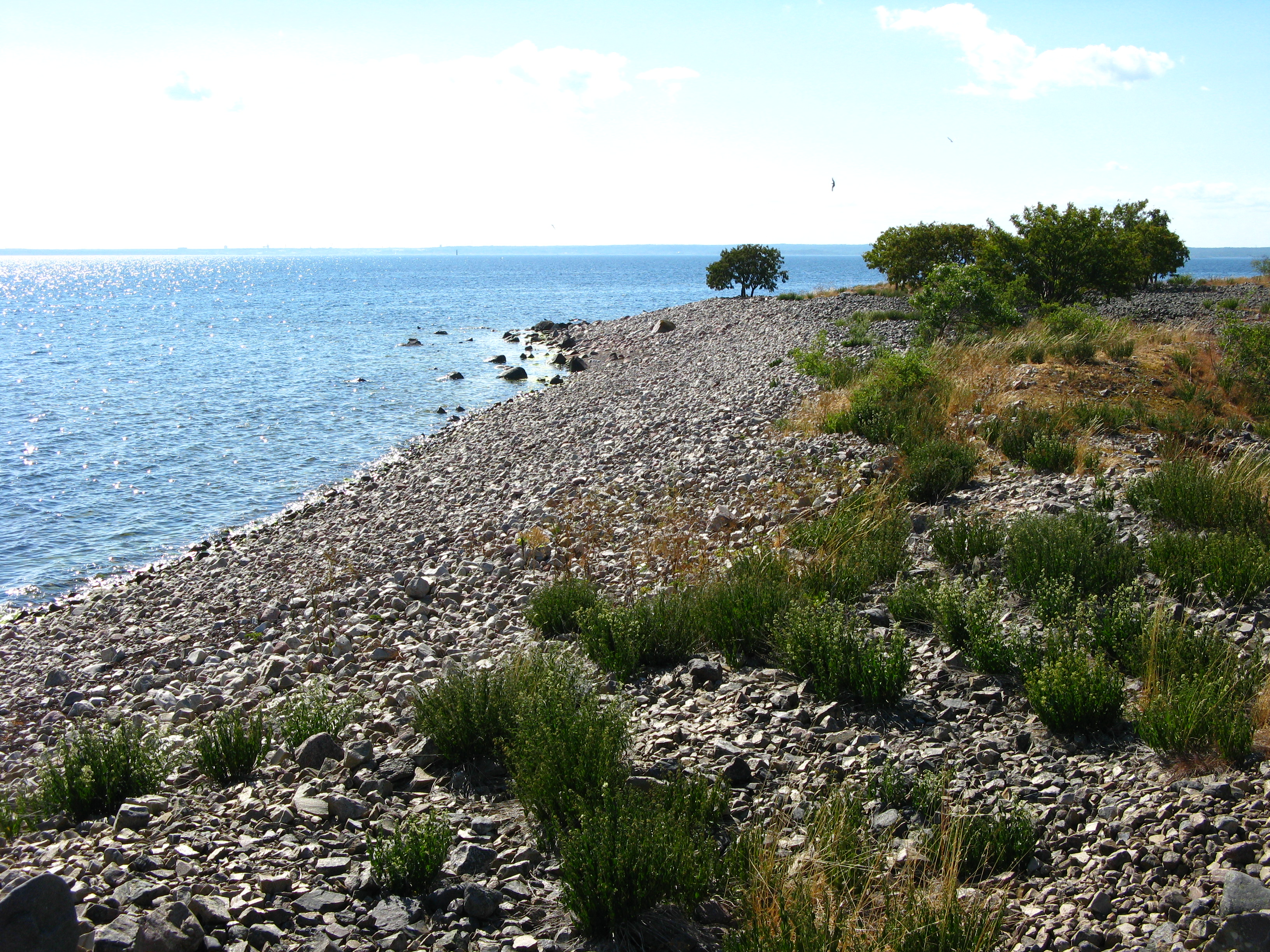
Furö.

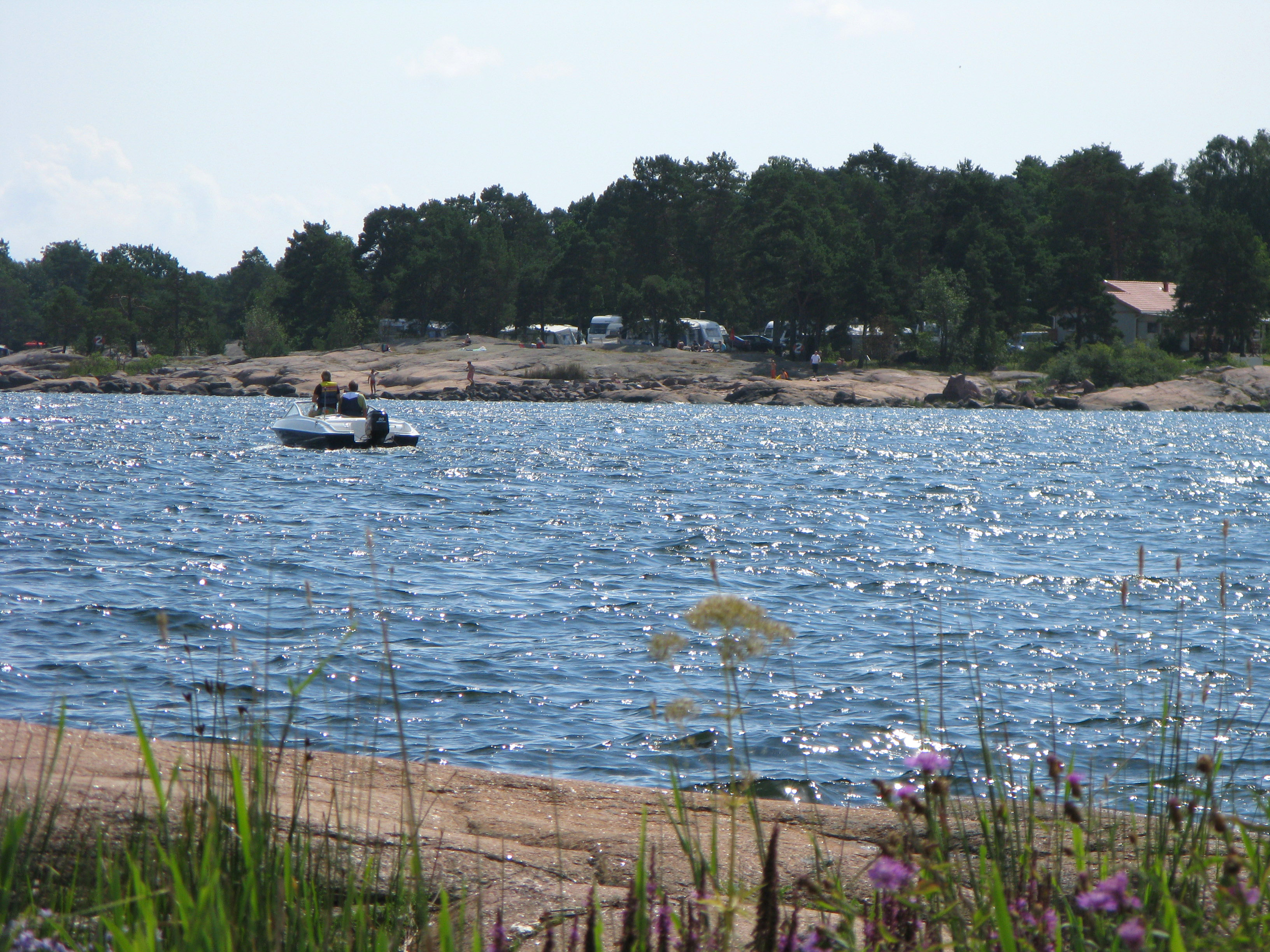
Gunnarsö

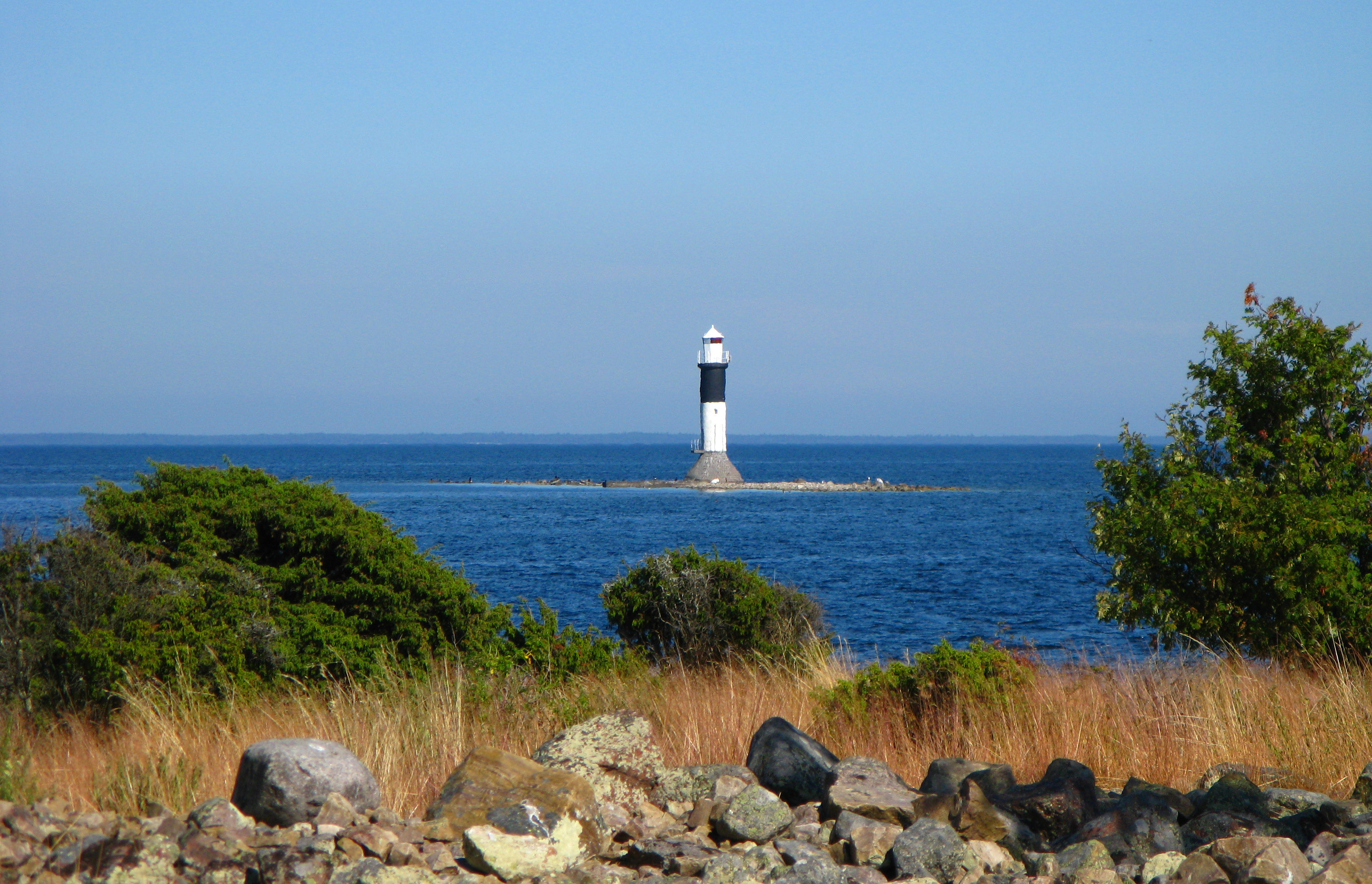
Lighthouse outside Furön.

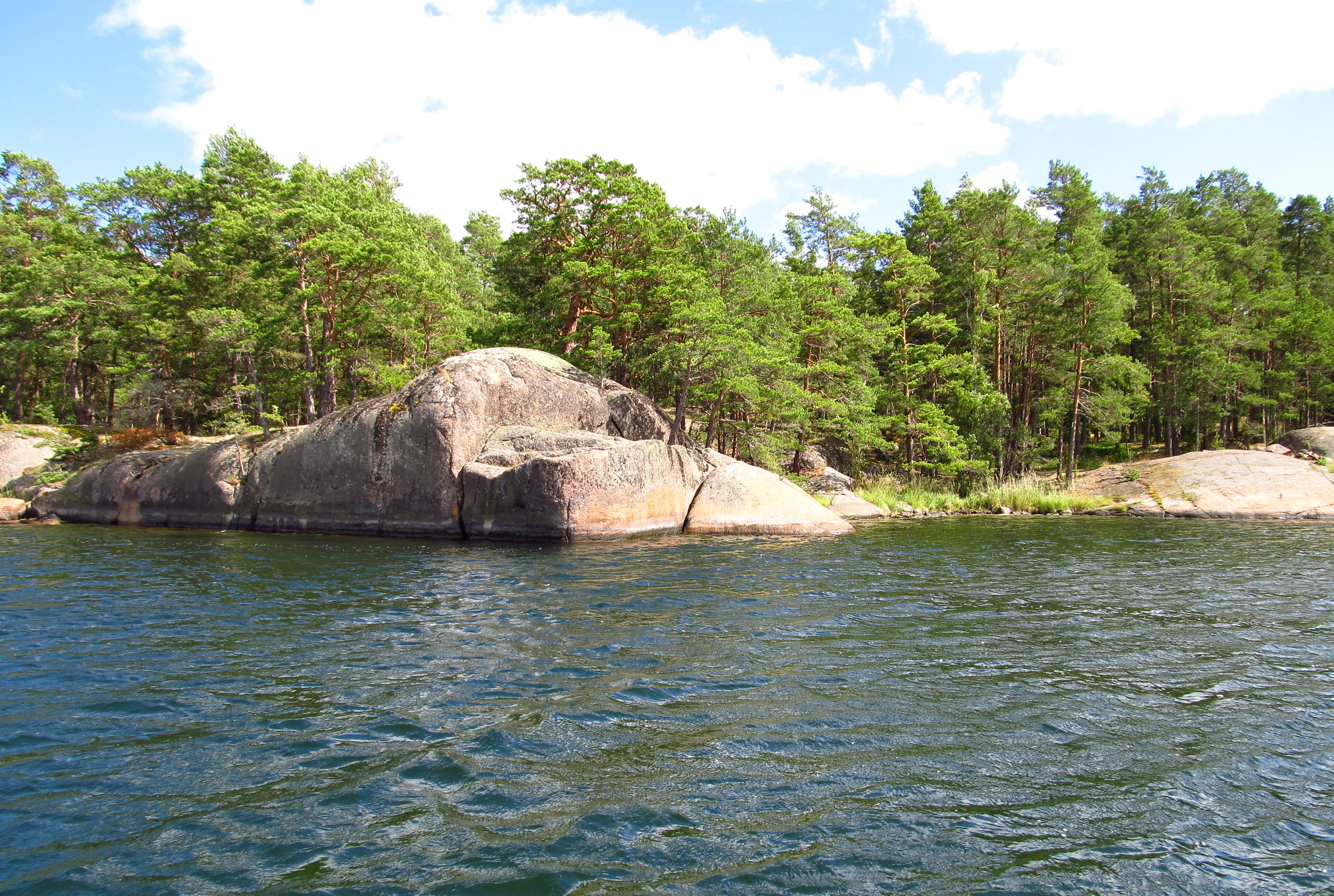
Isle of Storö.
