= Yasumasa Furo =

Japanese sports shooter (born 1944)

Yasumasa Furo (不老 安正, Furō Yasumasa; born 26 January 1944) is a Japanese sport shooter who competed in the 1988 Summer Olympics.
