= Furö =

Nature reserve in Kalmar, Sweden

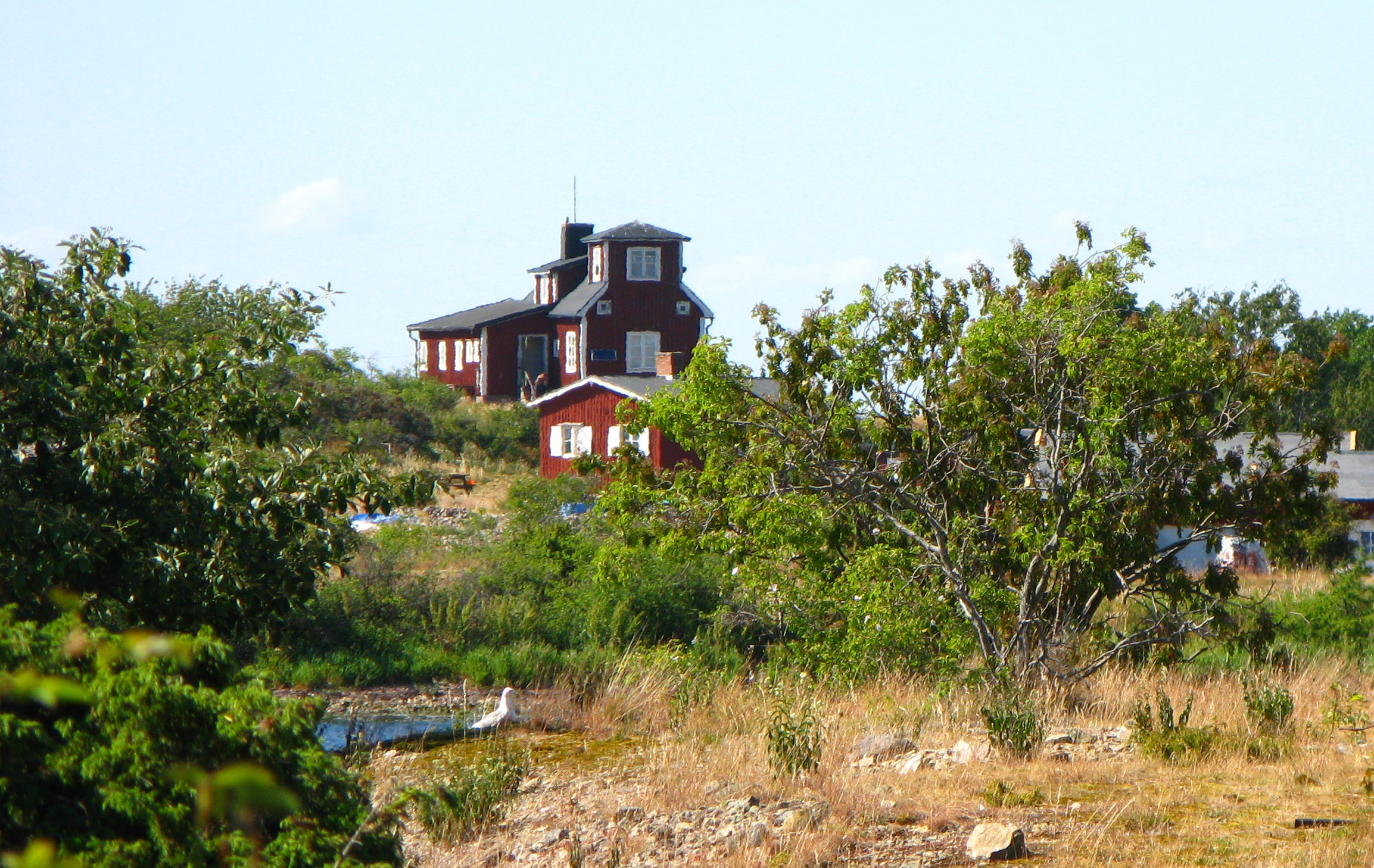
- The old pilot building on Furö from 1933.
- Interactive map of Furö

Geography
- Location: Oskarshamn archipelago, Baltic Sea
- Coordinates: 57°16′51″N 16°37′18″E
- Length: 1.1 km (0.68 mi)
- Width: 0.9 km (0.56 mi)

Administration
- Sweden
- Municipality: Oskarshamn

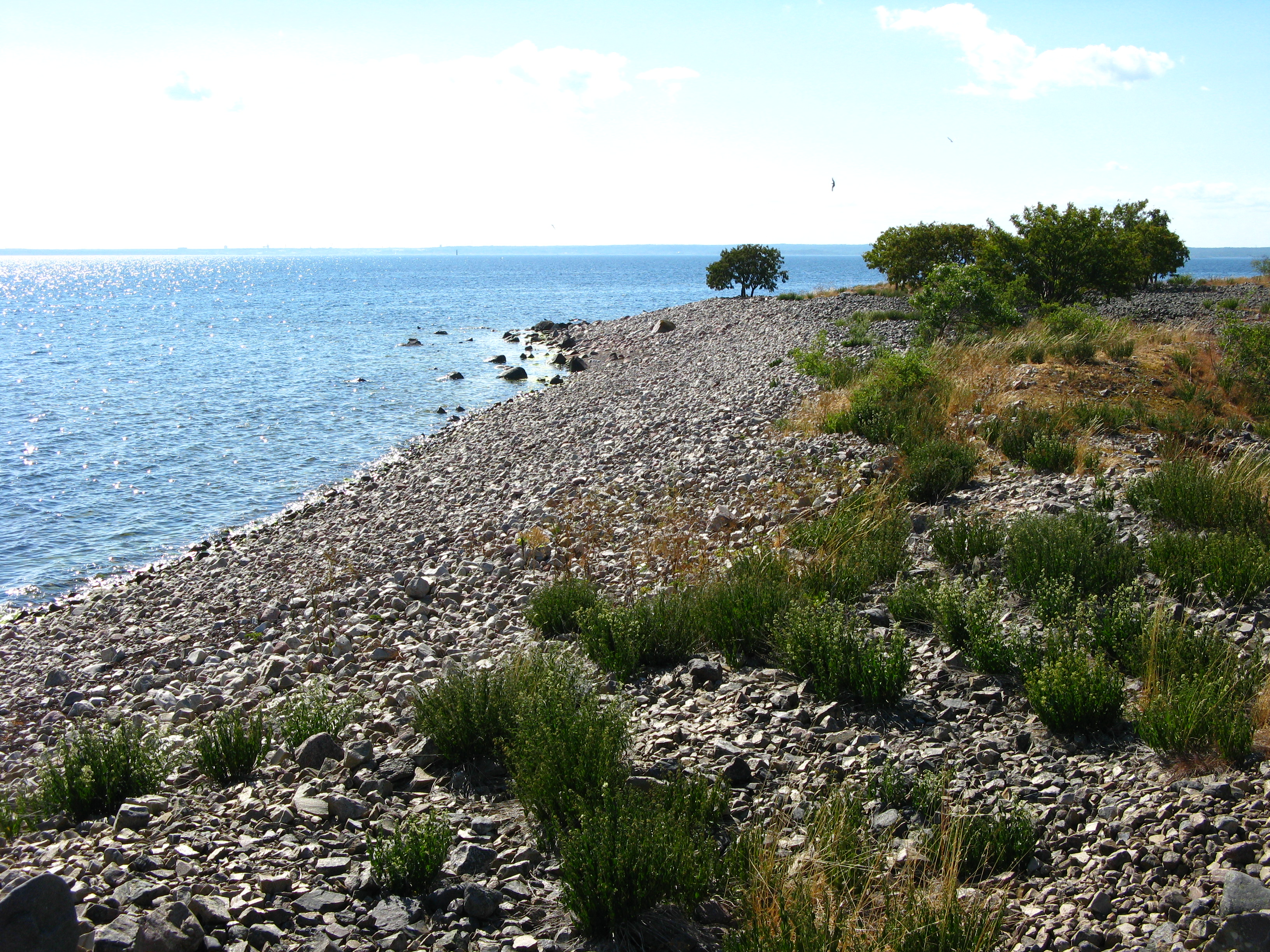
The southern shore on Furö.

Furö is an island located in the Baltic Sea five nautical miles (about 6 miles) off the east coast of Oskarshamn in Sweden.

== History ==
Historically the island has been used as base for fishing (mainly cod, herring and flounder). Today there are no permanent fishermen on the island. The whole island is a nature reserve and forms part of the EU-wide Natura 2000-network.

== Pilot and lighthouse ==
In 1874, the Swedish authorities located a lighthouse and a pilot station to Furö. The lighthouse was built at the north-western end of the island. The building was also used as accommodation for the pilots. In 1921 a new, more modern, lighthouse was raised at the reef Finnrevet just south-east off Furö. Today there are no pilots left on Furö, but their latest red wooden building from 1933 still exists, and is now used as a summer cottage. The island is today mainly used for recreation.

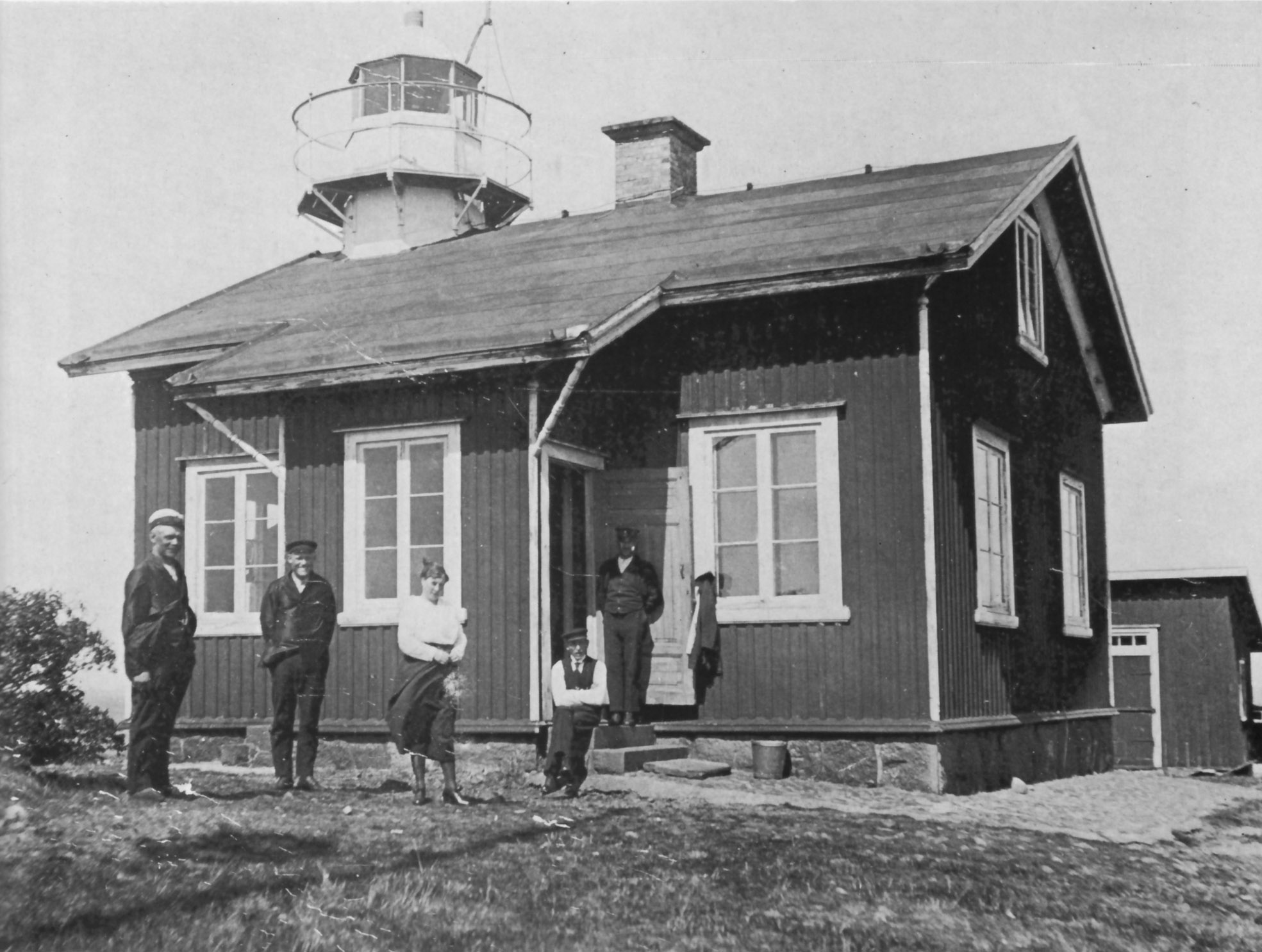
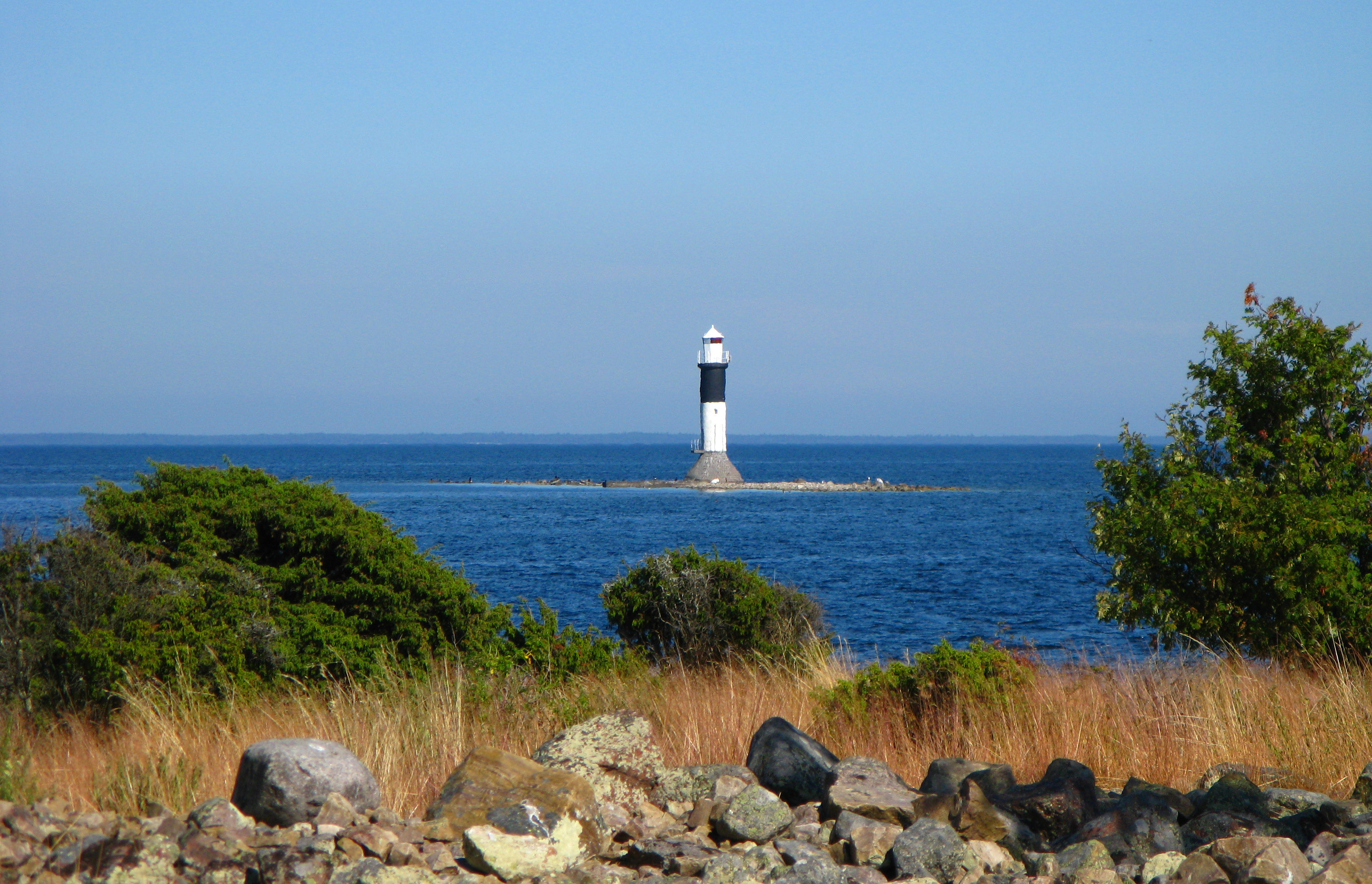
Left: The lighthouse built 1874. Right: The existing lighthouse Finnrevet from 1921.

== Shipwrecks ==
The waters around Furö are quite shallow. Many ships have run aground near the island. On the night of November 28, 1949 the British steamer Britkon ran aground at Furö during a heavy gale. The fully loaded ship was stranded on the reef Finnrevet just off the island. Eleven men and women reached the shore by lifeboat. The remaining 27 of the crew was rescued by the pilots on Furö. The Britkon was hard stranded and broke in half two days later. Today nothing is visible above the surface since the wreck has been partly broken up and salvaged.
