= Stora Hamnskär =

Island in the country of Sweden

- Location within Sweden

Geography
- Coordinates: 65.70715°N 24.10201°E
- Adjacent to: Bay of Bothnia

Administration
- Sweden
- County: Norrbotten
- Municipality: Haparanda

Stora Hamnskär is an island in the northeast of the Swedish sector of the Bothnian Bay, in the Haparanda archipelago.

== Location ==
Stora Hamnskär lies in the Haparanda archipelago, the part of the Norrbotten archipelago that is included in the Haparanda Municipality. All of the islands in the Haparanda archipelago have emerged in the last 1,500 years or so, as the bed of the bay has risen due to post-glacial rebound following the last ice age. This has contributed to a distinctive ecology. The eastern Gulf of Hamnskär provides a good night harbor except in an easterly wind, and the northeast cape has a good beach. It takes about an hour to reach the island by boat from Saskarö.

== Description ==
The isthmus between Stora Hamnskär and the Prokko Peninsula is mainly covered with grasslands, with flora that shows the influence of limestone. The rest of the island is well-wooded with rowan and alder trees. There are remains of the time when the island was used as a base for fishing. Commercial fishermen still use the surrounding waters. There is an old cabin dating from fishing times, which can be rented, and a modern sleeping cabin. Wells provide water, and there is an old ice cellar. There is also a sauna and a barbecue pit.

== Siberian primrose ==
About 30.3 hectares (75 acres) of the island has been chosen for inclusion in Natura 2000 because it is abundant in Siberian Primrose (Primula nutans), a species listed in the Habitats directive. The protected area consists of the southeast shore of Stora Hamnskär, the Prokko peninsula to the east and the isthmus between Stora Hamnskär and Prokko. The goal is to maintain 2,300 plants.

The main danger facing the plants is exploitation of the beaches by humans. There is also a risk of genetic problems due to the small population. The Siberian Primrose is red-listed in the Near Threatened category in Sweden. The plant grows in meadows and boulder beaches. The environment on Stora Hepokari is unstable, because uplift eliminates suitable terrain while new areas appear. The plant's seeds are wind-dispersed, but may also be carried by water.
