= Sandskär =

Island in the Haparanda archipelago, Sweden

- Location within Sweden

Geography
- Coordinates: 65.573016°N 23.752943°E
- Adjacent to: Bay of Bothnia

Administration
- Sweden

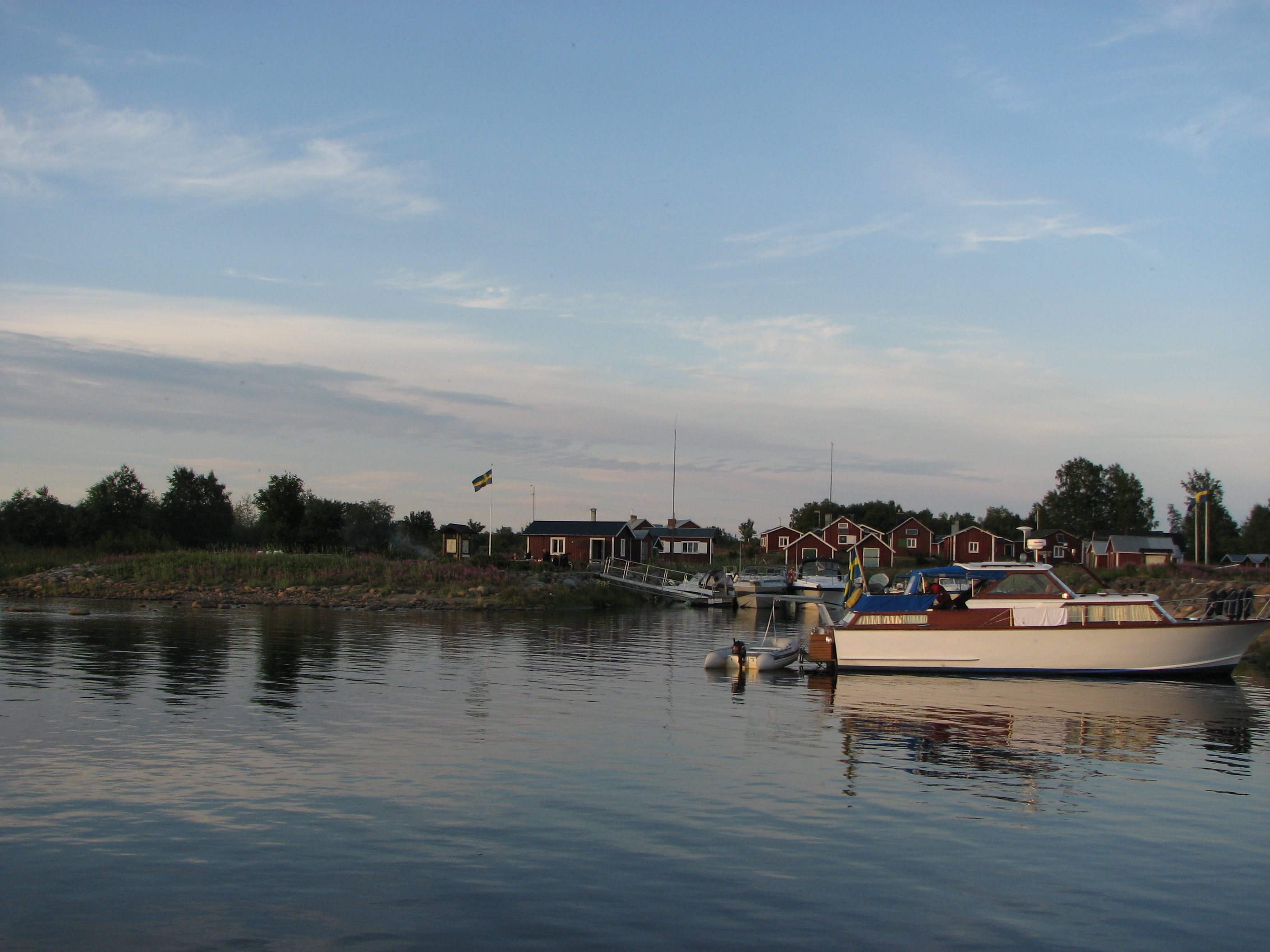
Village of Kumpula on Sandskär

Sandskär is an island in the northeast of the Swedish sector of the Bay of Bothnia. Once used as a base for fishing and sealing, it is now part of a national park.

== Location ==
Sandskär is the largest island in the Haparanda Archipelago National Park (Swedish: Haparanda skärgårds nationalpark), in the Haparanda archipelago, to the west of the Finnish Perämeri National Park. It may be reached from the mainland harbor of Haparanda in a one-hour boat-trip. The island was once used as a base for fishing Baltic herring and hunting seals. The remains of an old fishing village are still visible. The old chapel has been preserved and may be visited by tourists. Behind it there is a modest graveyard. Sunday visitors still fish for whitefish, whitebait and salmon. The island has a marina, cabins, toilet, sauna and camping area. There is a 5 kilometres (3.1 mi) boardwalk hiking trail.

== Terrain ==
All of the islands in the Haparanda archipelago have emerged in the last 1,500 years or so, as the bed of the bay has risen due to post-glacial rebound following the last ice age. The island would have first emerged as a reef, but now contains moorlands, dunes, beaches, dense woods and meadows. The core of the island is moraine shingle, on which sand has accumulated. The island lies in shallow water. The seabed around the island is often exposed and dries up, and the sand blows onto the island to form dunes, some of which are very large. The moorlands and dunes are in the south of the island, while the north has wetlands and deciduous forest.

== Ecology ==
The island's flora include meadows, heath and forests of pine, birch and especially aspen. Around mid summer orchids and lily-of-the-valley bloom in the meadows. The island provides a varied habitat for over two hundred bird species, which use it for nesting or resting. Waders and ducks will be seen in the many shallow bays. The non-profit Haparanda Sandskär Bird Observatory on Sandskär was founded in 1981. Since then over 100,000 birds of 137 species have been ringed. The most common species are the willow warbler, redpoll, brambling and common reed bunting, but rarer eastern species such as the dusky warbler and yellow-browed warbler are often caught.
