= Seskar Furö =

Island in the Haparanda archipelago, Sweden

- Location within Sweden

Geography
- Coordinates: 65.642987°N 23.78779°E
- Adjacent to: Bay of Bothnia
- Area: 3 km^{2} (1.2 sq mi)

Administration
- Sweden
- Province: Norrbotten
- Municipality: Haparanda

Demographics
- Population: uninhabited

Seskar Furö is an uninhabited island in the northeast of the Swedish sector of the Bay of Bothnia. It is now part of a national park.

== Location ==
Seskar Furö is the second largest island in the Haparanda Archipelago National Park (Swedish: Haparanda skärgårds nationalpark), in the Haparanda archipelago, to the west of the Finnish Perämeri National Park. All of the islands in the Haparanda archipelago have emerged in the last 1,500 years or so, as the bed of the bay has risen due to post-glacial rebound following the last ice age. The land continues to rise at about 8.5 millimetres (0.33 in) per year, so the island is steadily expanding.

The island is sandy, with large dunes on the western shores. It is mostly covered by relatively undisturbed pine forests. There are remains of a former fishing village, including a turf maze.
