= Nikkala =

- Location within Norrbotten Location within Sweden
- Coordinates: 65°48′N 23°55′E
- Country: Sweden
- Province: Norrbotten
- County: Norrbotten County
- Municipality: Haparanda Municipality

Area
  - Total: 1.23 km^{2} (0.47 sq mi)
- Elevation: 0 m (0 ft)

Population (31 December 2010)
  - Total: 435
  - Density: 353/km^{2} (910/sq mi)
- Time zone: UTC+1 (CET)
  - Summer (DST): UTC+2 (CEST)

Nikkala is a locality situated in Haparanda Municipality, Norrbotten County, Sweden with 435 inhabitants in 2010.
