= Seskarö =

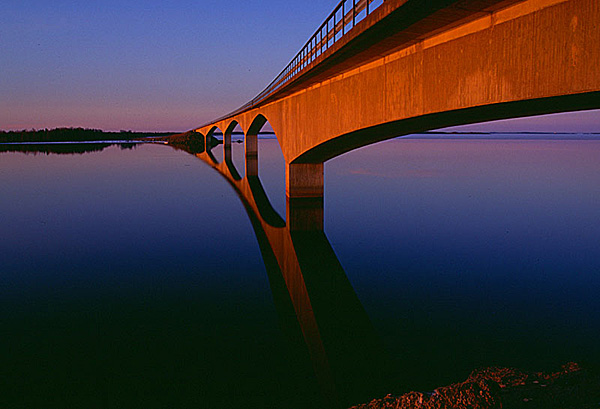
- The bridge to Seskarö

- Location within Norrbotten Location within Sweden
- Coordinates: 65°44′19″N 23°44′20″E
- Country: Sweden
- Province: Norrbotten
- County: Norrbotten County
- Municipality: Haparanda Municipality

Area
  - Total: 1.62 km^{2} (0.63 sq mi)

Population (31 December 2010)
  - Total: 491
  - Density: 304/km^{2} (790/sq mi)
- Time zone: UTC+1 (CET)
  - Summer (DST): UTC+2 (CEST)

Seskarö (Meänkieli and Finnish: Seittenkaari) is a locality situated in Haparanda Municipality, Norrbotten County, Sweden with 491 inhabitants in 2010. It is located on the island with the same name which is about 20 km^{2} and situated in the Haparanda Archipelago. Since 1978, it has been connected to the mainland through a bridge, via some intermediate islands.

== See also ==
- Seskarö Uprising
