= Bothnian Bay National Park =

National park in Lapland, Finland

- IUCN category II (national park)
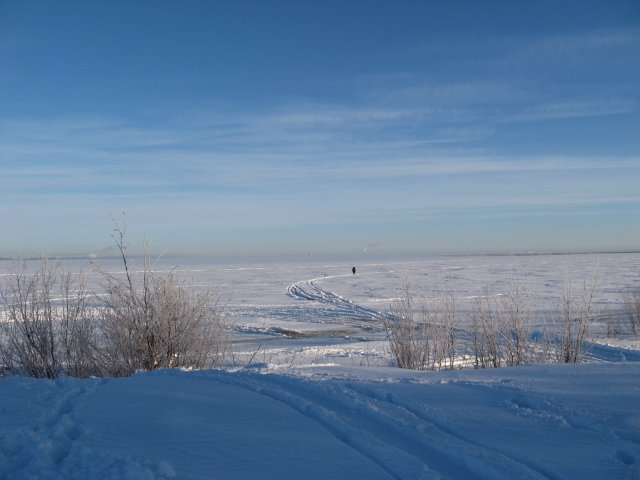

- Location within Finland
- Location: Lapland, Finland
- Coordinates: 65°37′N 024°19′E
- Area: 157 km^{2} (61 sq mi)
- Established: 1991
- Visitors: 6,300 (in 2024)
- Governing body: Metsähallitus
- Website: https://www.luontoon.fi/en/destinations/bothnian-bay-national-park

Bothnian Bay National Park (Finnish: Perämeren kansallispuisto, Swedish: Bottenvikens nationalpark) is a national park in Lapland, Finland. The park which was established in 1991, covers 157 square kilometres (61 sq mi) of which 2.5 square kilometres (0.97 sq mi) is on land. It is maintained by Metsähallitus.

The islands in the area have been formed by post-glacial rebound, and the scenery is still in a constant state of change. There are also numerous traditional fishing bases.

The national park is reachable by boat although visiting is only recommended for experienced boaters.

== See also ==
- List of national parks of Finland
- Protected areas of Finland
