= Norrbotten archipelago =

Group of Swedish Islands

- Location within Sweden

Geography
- Coordinates: 65.487335°N 22.435241°E
- Adjacent to: Bay of Bothnia

Administration
- Sweden
- Province: Norrbotten

The Norrbotten archipelago (Swedish: Norrbotten skärgård) is a group of Swedish islands in the north part of the Bay of Bothnia. A few of the islands have small permanent populations, but most are used only for recreation in the summer months. They are icebound during the winter.

== Location ==
The north of the bay of Bothnia contains a large archipelago area. The islands in the Swedish sector make up the Norrbotten archipelago. It is divided into the archipelagos of Piteå (550 islands), Luleå (1,312 islands), Kalix (792 islands) and Haparanda (652 islands). The largest island is Rånön in the Kalix archipelago. Due to post-glacial rebound the land is rising at from 0.8 to 1 centimetre (0.31 to 0.39 in) annually, so the shoreline can retreat by as much as 100 metres (330 ft) in one person's lifetime. As a result, the islands are growing in size but the waters and harbors are becoming shallower.

== Climate ==
The archipelago is only 100 kilometres (62 mi) south of the Arctic Circle, so there is daylight for 24 hours in the summer, and full moon all day in the winter. The waters around the archipelago are brackish, with less the 10% of the salt content of the Atlantic. The sea freezes in January and remain frozen until March–April.

== Gallery ==
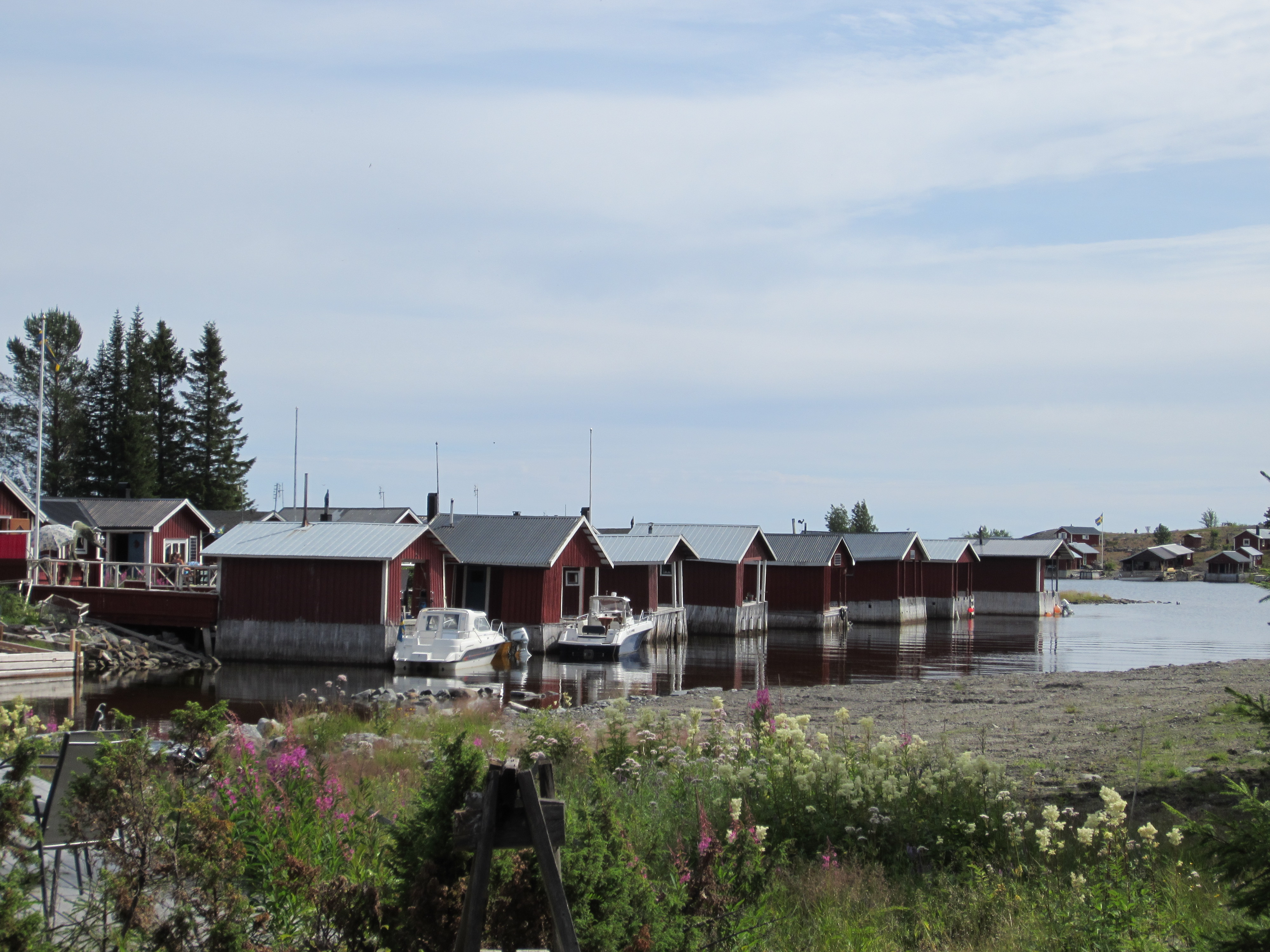
Old fishing huts at Brändöskär

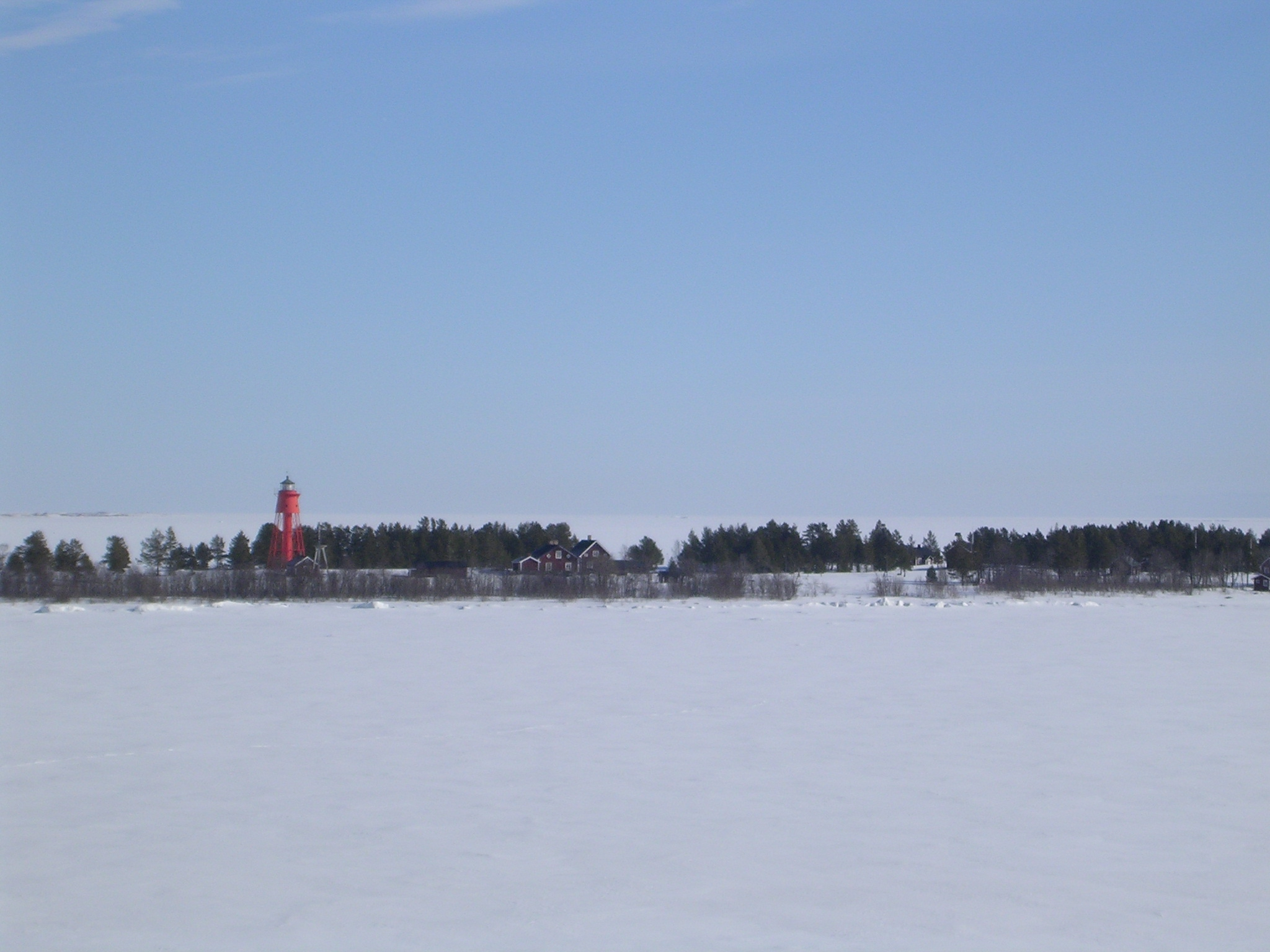
Rödkallen in winter

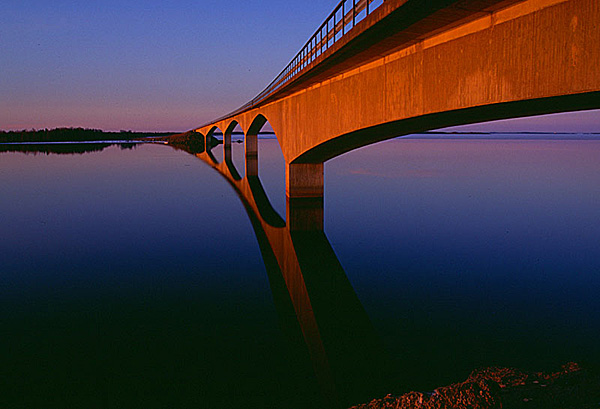
The bridge to Seskarö

== See also ==
- List of islands of Bothnian Bay
