= Haparanda archipelago =

Group of 792 Swedish islands

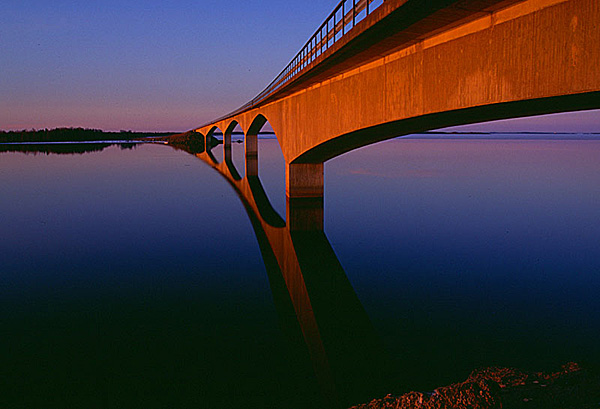
- The bridge to Seskarö

- Location within Sweden

Geography
- Coordinates: 65.662236°N 23.923888°E
- Adjacent to: Bay of Bothnia

Administration
- Sweden
- Province: Norrbotten
- Municipality: Haparanda Municipality

The Haparanda archipelago (Swedish: Haparanda skärgård) is a group of 792 Swedish islands in the northern part of the Bay of Bothnia. The islands are used for recreation in the summer months. They are icebound during the winter.

== Location ==
The north of the bay of Bothnia contains a large archipelago area. The islands in the Swedish sector make up the Norrbotten archipelago. It is divided into the archipelagos of Piteå (550 islands), Luleå (1,312 islands), Kalix (792 islands) and Haparanda (652 islands). Due to post-glacial rebound the land is rising at from 0.8 to 1 centimetre (0.31 to 0.39 in) annually, so the shoreline can retreat by as much as 100 metres (330 ft) in one person's lifetime. As a result, the islands are growing in size but the waters and harbors are becoming shallower.

The Swedish Haparanda Archipelago National Park (Swedish: Haparanda skärgårds nationalpark) lies within the Haparanda group of islands. It includes the larger islands of Sandskär and Seskar Furö, and some smaller islands and skerries. All of these islands have emerged in the last 1,500 years as the bed of the bay has risen. Some of the other islands in Haparanda archipelago include Hanhinkari, Kataja, Seskarö, Skomakaren, Stora Hamnskär, Stora Hepokari and Torne-Furö.

Kataja is divided between Sweden and Finland. The border was established in 1809 between two islands, a larger Swedish one called Kataja and a smaller Finnish one called Inakari. In the years since then, post-glacial rebound has caused the land in the region to rise relative to sea level, joining the two islands.

== Climate ==
The archipelago is only 100 kilometres (62 mi) south of the Arctic Circle, so there is daylight for 24 hours in the summer, and full moon all day in the winter. The waters around the archipelago are brackish, with less the 10% of the salt content of the Atlantic. The sea freezes in January and remain frozen until March–April.

== See also ==
- List of islands of the Haparanda archipelago
