= Gotland Deep =

Marine depression in the Baltic Sea

Coordinates: 57.32°N 20.05°E

Position of the Gotland Deep in the Baltic Sea

The Gotland Deep (Swedish: Gotlandsdjupet), is a marine depression in the Baltic Sea and, at 248m below sea level, is its fourth lowest point, after the Landsort Deep, Åland Deep (channel of the Åland Sea) and Ulvo Deep (Bothnian Sea). It is noted for having a periodically anoxic environment.

It is located between the Swedish island of Gotland and the Latvian west coast and marks the deepest point of the East Gotland Basin.

Cores from the Gotland Deep have provided insights into the climate and geologic history of the Baltic during the Holocene.

== See also ==
- Depression (geology)
- Mariana Trench
- Landsort Deep
