= Kahvankari =

Island in Oulu, Finland

- Location within Finland

Geography
- Coordinates: 65.055588°N 25.344599°E
- Adjacent to: Bay of Bothnia
- Area: 0.016 km^{2} (0.0062 sq mi)

Administration
- Finland
- Region: Northern Ostrobothnia
- Municipality: Oulu

Demographics
- Population: Uninhabited

Kahvankari is a small uninhabited island in the Finnish sector of the Bay of Bothnia offshore from the city of Oulu.

== Description ==
Kahvankari lies to the north of the Hermannit island and to the south of the larger Kellon Kraaseli island in the Kuivasmeri bay offshore from Taskila. It is about 2.2 kilometres (1.4 mi) from Letonniemi. The island is protected under the Nature Conservation Act. The island and surrounding water is part of a nature reserve.

The island is mainly covered with mixed forest, and its beaches are rocky. North of the island is a sand bar that stretches up to Kellon Kraaseli. Sea birds nest on the island, including the Ruddy turnstone (Arenaria interpres).

== Gallery ==
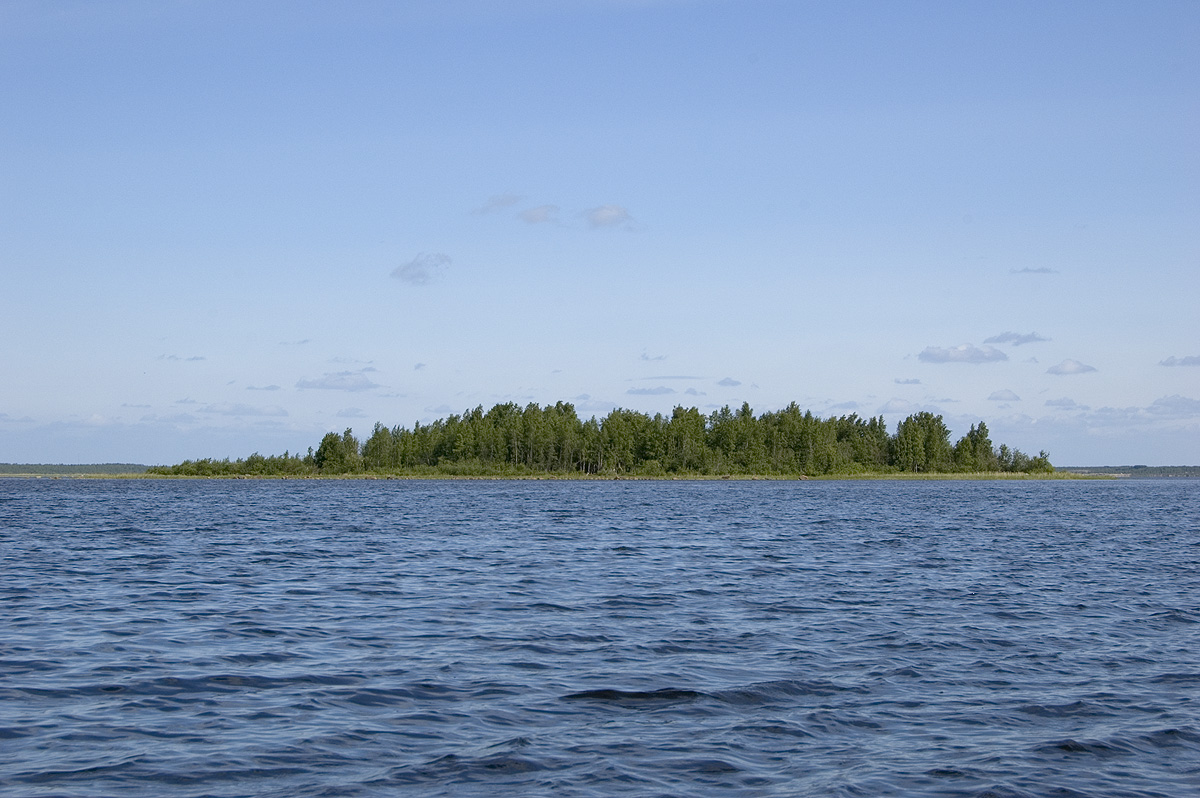
Kahvankari from the south
