= Gotland Basin =

The Gotland Basin is the large central basin in the Baltic Sea between Sweden and the Baltic countries. It is subdivided into the Gdansk Deep (or Gdansk Basin), the Western Gotland Basin, and the Eastern Gotland Basin. Within the Eastern Gotland Basin is the Gotland Deep (249 metres deep) which is an anoxic basin. The Western Gotland Basin contains Landsort Deep, which is the deepest spot of the Baltic sea (459 metres deep).

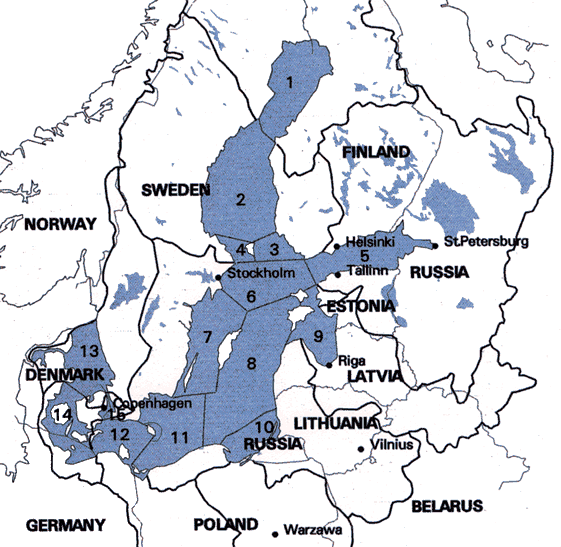
The Gotland Basin is marked by the numbers 7, 8 and 10 in this map of the area's marine environment.

The sediments in the Gotland Basin are important for studying the climate changes in northern Europe over the past 5,000 years.
