= Bothnian Bay =

Bay in the northern Bothnian Sea

- Bay of Bothnia
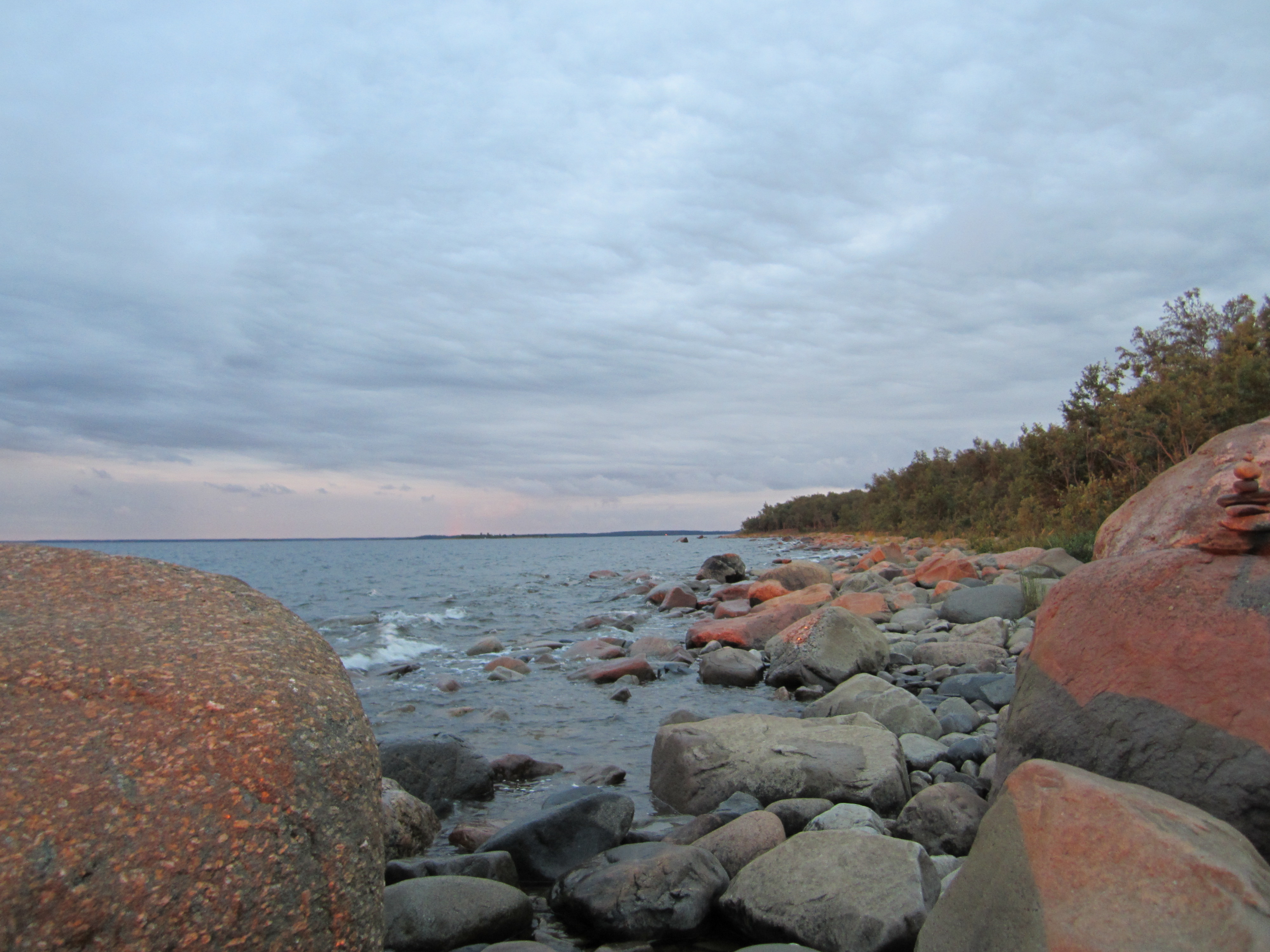
- The rocky shoreline of Ohtakari, in the southeast of the bay

- Location of the Bothnian Bay in Europe
- Location: Fennoscandia
- Coordinates: 65°N 023°E
- Type: Sea
- Primary outflows: Bothnian Sea
- Catchment area: 260,675 km^{2} (100,647 sq mi)
- Basin countries: Finland, Norway, and Sweden
- Surface area: 36,800 km^{2} (14,200 sq mi)
- Average depth: 43 m (141 ft)
- Max. depth: 147 m (482 ft)
- Water volume: 1,490 km^{3} (360 cu mi)
- Frozen: 110–190 days annually

The Bothnian Bay or Bay of Bothnia (Swedish: Bottenviken; Finnish: Perämeri) is the northernmost part of the Gulf of Bothnia, which is in turn the northern part of the Baltic Sea. The land holding the bay is still rising after the weight of ice-age glaciers has been removed, and within 2,000 years the bay will be a large freshwater lake since its link to the south Kvarken is mostly less than 20 metres (66 ft) deep. The bay today is fed by several large rivers, and is relatively unaffected by tides, so has low salinity. It freezes over each year for up to six months. Compared to other parts of the Baltic, it has little plant or animal life.

== Extent ==
The bay is divided from the Bothnian Sea, the southern part of the Gulf of Bothnia, by the Northern Quark (Kvarken) strait. The Northern Quark has a greatest depth of 65 metres (213 ft), with two ridges that are just 25 metres (82 ft) deep. It lies between a group of islands off Vaasa in Finland and another group at Holmöarna in Sweden. The bay is bounded by Finland to the east and Sweden to the west. The bay is asymmetric, with a smoother and shallower bottom slope on the Finnish side, and a deeper bottom with a steeper and more rugged coast on the Swedish side.

The Bothnian Bay has a catchment area of 260,675 square kilometres (100,647 sq mi). Of this, 56% lies in Finland, 44% in Sweden and less than 1% in Norway. The catchment contains about 11,500,000 hectares (28,000,000 acres) of forest, split roughly equally between Sweden and Finland.

The average depth is 41 metres (135 ft). The Luleå Deep is the deepest part of the bay, at 146 metres (479 ft), southeast of the town of Luleå. On the Finnish side the average depth is 30 metres (98 ft). The deepest part is near the island of Lönkytin, with a depth of 50 metres (160 ft).

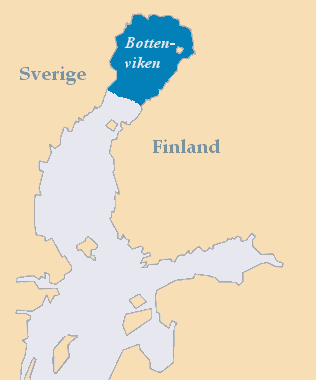
Map of the Gulf of Bothnia showing location of Bothnian Bay (shaded and labelled Bottenviken)

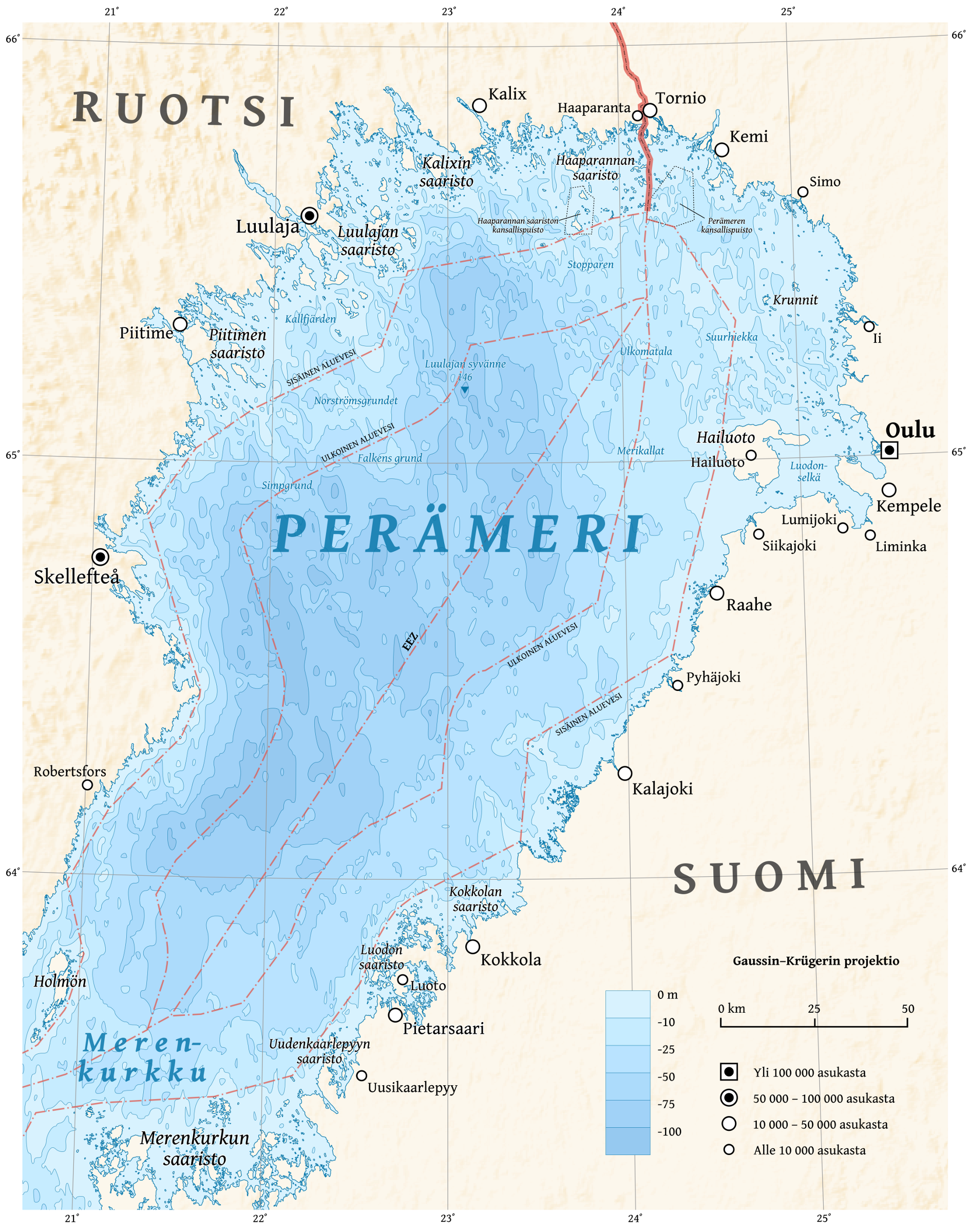
Finnish map of the bay – click to enlarge

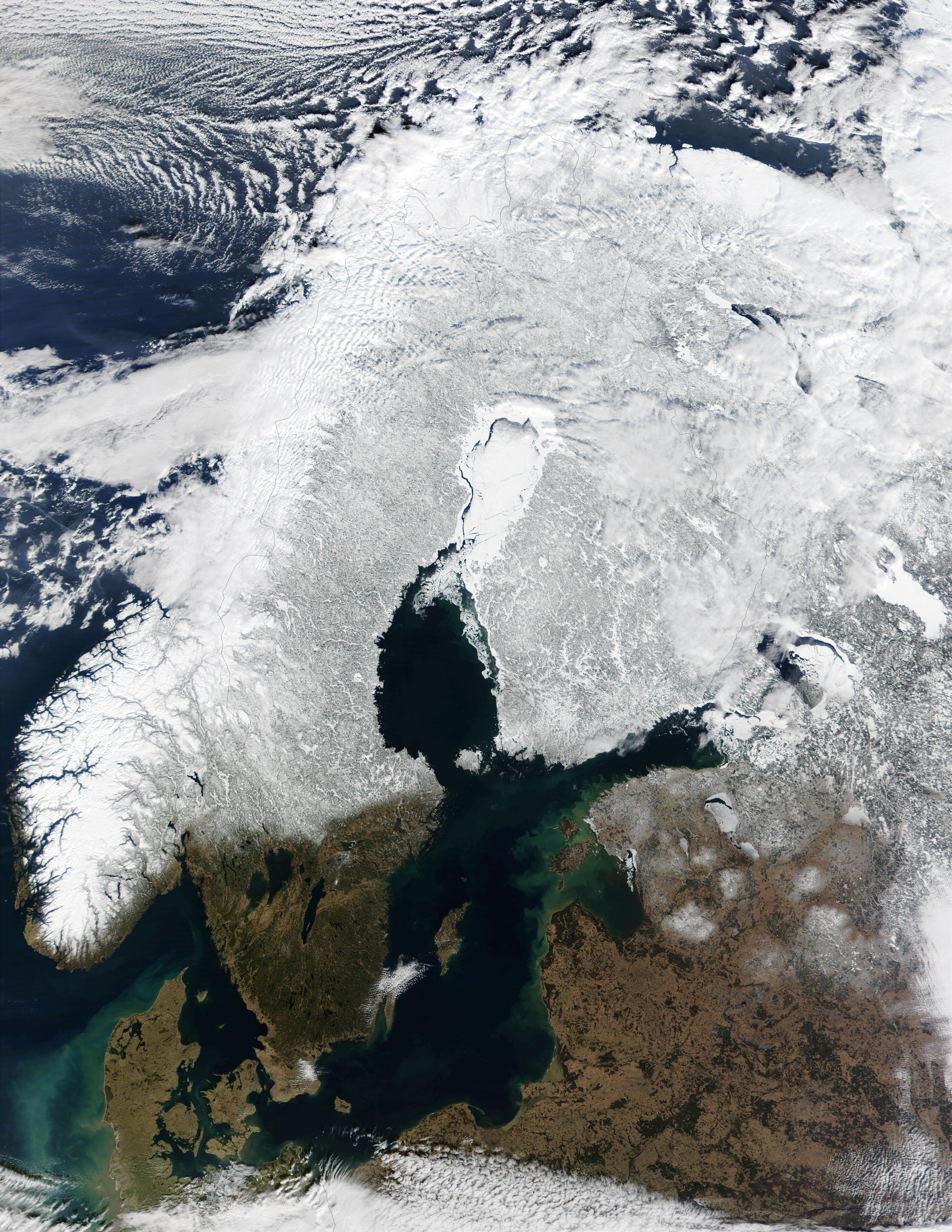
Satellite image of Fennoscandia with sea ice covering the Bothnian Bay (white region in center)

=== Isostatic rebound ===
The bay lies in the area in Northern Europe where the ice was at its thickest during the last ice age. The Bay of Bothnia was under ice until the "Ancylus Lake" period (7500–6000 BC), when the ice sheet withdrew to the mountains of Northern Scandinavia. The land is now rising by post-glacial rebound at the highest rate in the Baltic Sea, at an estimated rate of 9 millimetres (0.35 in) a year. Today the Bothnian Bay lies around 300 metres (980 ft) higher than it did at the end of the Last Ice Age. The local population has seen the sea retreating during their lifetimes from piers and boathouses, leaving them stranded on land. Some former islands such as Porsön and Hertsön near the city of Luleå are still called islands, but are now connected to the mainland.

The maximum depth at the Kvarken sound today is around 20 metres (66 ft). Within 2,000 years, the exit from the bay at Kvarken will be raised above sea level, which will result in it becoming Europe's largest lake.

== Hydrology ==
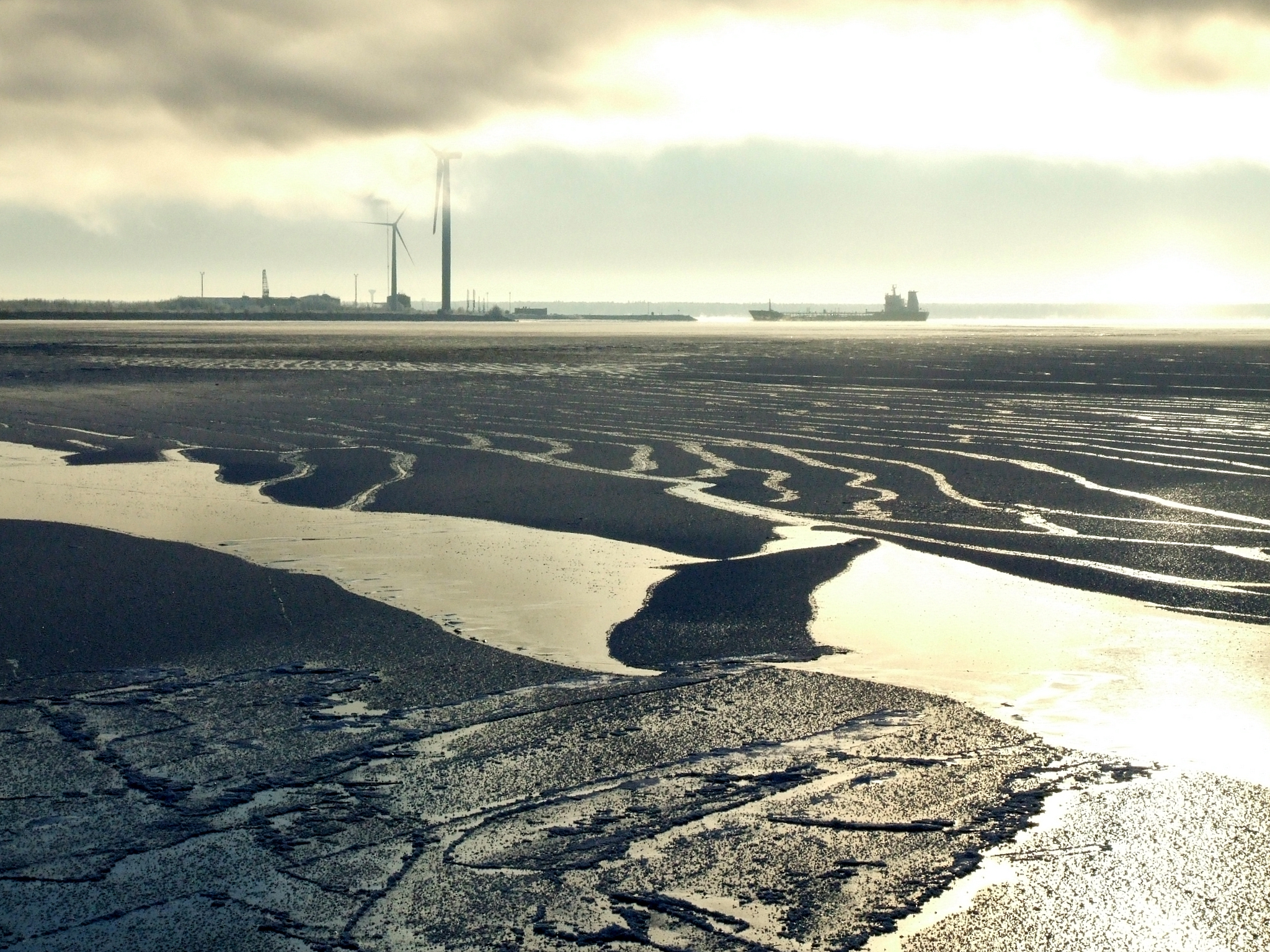
A cargo ship approaching the Vihreäsaari harbour in Oulu, Finland, while the Bay of Bothnia starts to freeze for the winter

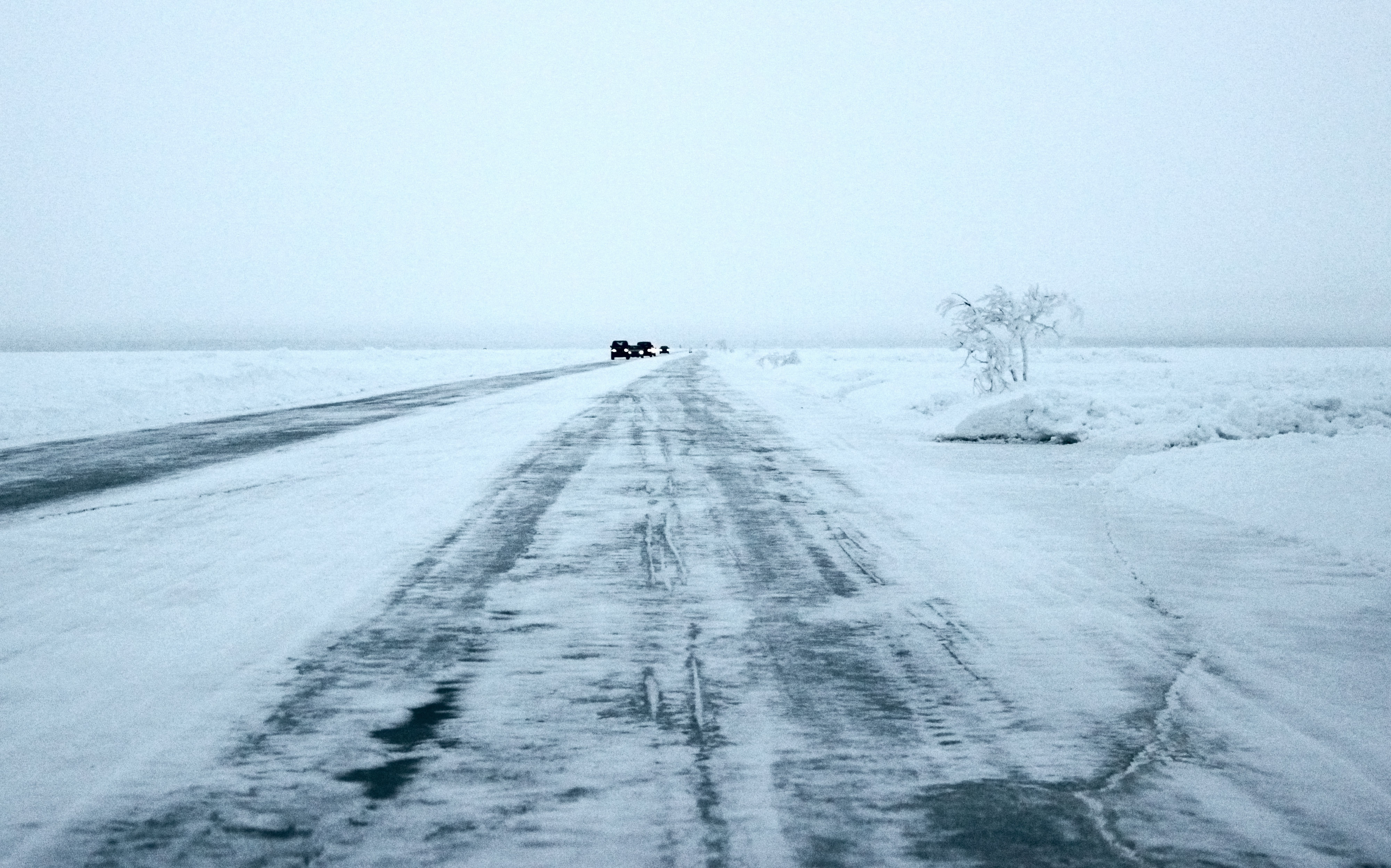
The ice road between the Hailuoto island and the mainland

The Bothnian Bay has a harsher environment than other parts of the greater Baltic Sea. The bay is ice-covered for 110 to 190 days each year. Tides have little effect, but high winds driving the water from the south or north may cause the water level to rise or fall by 1.5 metres (4 ft 11 in).

Major rivers that flow into the bay include:

River	Country	Discharge
Kemijoki	Finland	556 m^{3}/s (19,600 cu ft/s)
Lule River	Sweden	506 m^{3}/s (17,900 cu ft/s)
Torne River	Sweden and Finland	388 m^{3}/s (13,700 cu ft/s)
Kalix River	Sweden	295 m^{3}/s (10,400 cu ft/s)
Oulujoki	Finland	250 m^{3}/s (8,800 cu ft/s)
Pite River	Sweden	167 m^{3}/s (5,900 cu ft/s)
Skellefte River	Sweden	162 m^{3}/s (5,700 cu ft/s)
Iijoki	Finland	164 m^{3}/s (5,800 cu ft/s)

The salinity is only about 0.2 psu in the northern part of the bay, dropping almost to zero in some of the archipelagos with large river inflows. The low salinity and cold temperatures in winter results in ice that is considerably stronger than more saline or warmer ice.

== Islands ==
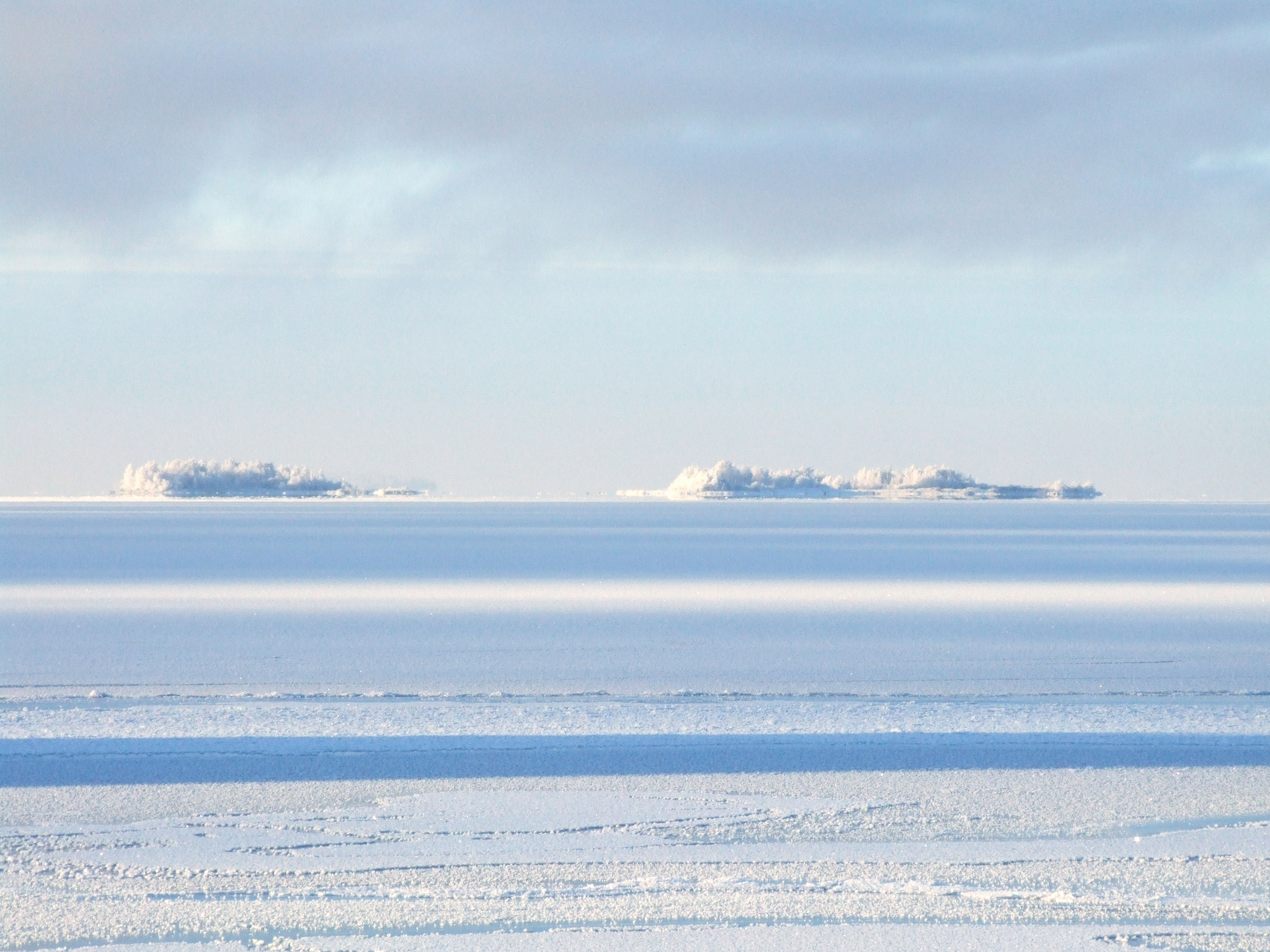
The Hermanni islands. A wintery view of a group of small islands in the Bothnian Bay near Oulu, Finland

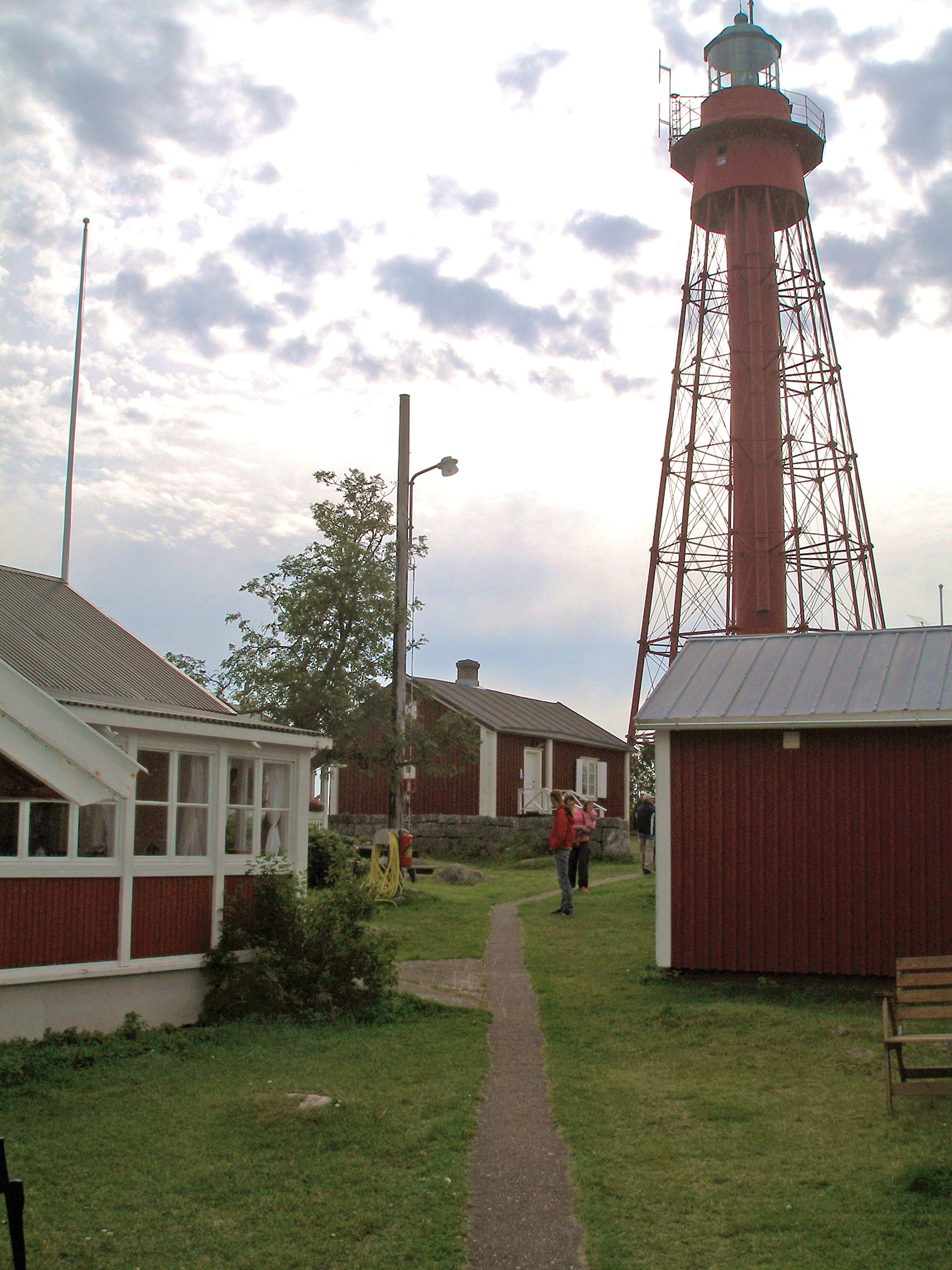
The lighthouse on the island of Pite-Rönnskär in Bothnian Bay

If an island is defined as an area of land more than 20 square metres (220 sq ft) that is surrounded by water, the Bay of Bothnia has 4,001 islands. The largest island is Hailuoto. The north of the bay contains a large archipelago area. The Swedish portion of this area is the Norrbotten archipelago. This is divided into the Piteå, Luleå, Kalix and Haparanda archipelagos. Many of the islands are uninhabited and in a natural state. In the winter the larger islands may be accessed via ice roads. Some of them are inhabited or have seasonal fishing villages used by people from the mainland.

The Swedish Haparanda Archipelago National Park (Swedish: Haparanda skärgårds nationalpark) occupies the Haparanda group of islands, bordering the Finnish Bothnian Bay National Park. It includes the larger islands of Sandskär and Seskar Furö, and some smaller islands and skerries. All of these islands have emerged in the last 1,500 years as the bed of the bay has risen. The Bay of Bothnia National Park in the Finnish section (Finnish: Perämeren kansallispuisto, Swedish: Bottenvikens nationalpark), established in 1991, is located in the archipelago offshore from Tornio and Kemi. It covers 157 square kilometres (61 sq mi) of which about 2.5 square kilometres (0.97 sq mi) is land.

== Climate ==
The immediate coastal areas of the Bothnian Bay tend to be bordering between humid continental and subarctic climates. The summers on the coastlines are the northernmost coastlines to average above 20 °C (68 °F) in summer. In winter the sea freezes over, many times completely. This means that there is vast seasonal lag offshore such as on the island of Rödkallen on the Swedish side. Due to the mild nature of summers and the low diurnals, offshore islands tend to be humid continental since September usually stays above 10 °C (50 °F) means.

Climate data for Luleå Airport, 2002–2020 averages; extremes since 1944
Month	Jan	Feb	Mar	Apr	May	Jun	Jul	Aug	Sep	Oct	Nov	Dec	Year
Record high °C (°F)	10.3 (50.5)	9.8 (49.6)	13.4 (56.1)	18.1 (64.6)	28.4 (83.1)	32.2 (90.0)	32.1 (89.8)	29.2 (84.6)	22.5 (72.5)	16.9 (62.4)	13.0 (55.4)	8.5 (47.3)	32.2 (90.0)
Mean maximum °C (°F)	4.0 (39.2)	5.3 (41.5)	8.7 (47.7)	13.3 (55.9)	21.4 (70.5)	24.3 (75.7)	26.7 (80.1)	24.1 (75.4)	18.8 (65.8)	12.5 (54.5)	7.2 (45.0)	5.3 (41.5)	27.8 (82.0)
Mean daily maximum °C (°F)	−5.2 (22.6)	−4.5 (23.9)	0.2 (32.4)	5.6 (42.1)	12.3 (54.1)	17.4 (63.3)	20.5 (68.9)	18.7 (65.7)	13.4 (56.1)	5.9 (42.6)	0.6 (33.1)	−2.0 (28.4)	6.9 (44.4)
Daily mean °C (°F)	−9.1 (15.6)	−8.7 (16.3)	−4.2 (24.4)	1.5 (34.7)	7.7 (45.9)	13.3 (55.9)	16.6 (61.9)	15.0 (59.0)	9.9 (49.8)	2.9 (37.2)	−2.4 (27.7)	−5.6 (21.9)	3.1 (37.5)
Mean daily minimum °C (°F)	−13.0 (8.6)	−12.9 (8.8)	−8.5 (16.7)	−2.6 (27.3)	3.1 (37.6)	9.1 (48.4)	12.6 (54.7)	11.2 (52.2)	6.3 (43.3)	−0.2 (31.6)	−5.4 (22.3)	−9.1 (15.6)	−0.8 (30.6)
Mean minimum °C (°F)	−26.6 (−15.9)	−25.7 (−14.3)	−20.1 (−4.2)	−10.2 (13.6)	−3.1 (26.4)	3.5 (38.3)	7.3 (45.1)	4.3 (39.7)	−0.9 (30.4)	−9.7 (14.5)	−15.8 (3.6)	−21.2 (−6.2)	−29.2 (−20.6)
Record low °C (°F)	−42.3 (−44.1)	−38.2 (−36.8)	−32.3 (−26.1)	−20.4 (−4.7)	−8.8 (16.2)	−1.2 (29.8)	3.2 (37.8)	−0.2 (31.6)	−8.4 (16.9)	−20.7 (−5.3)	−30.3 (−22.5)	−33.7 (−28.7)	−42.3 (−44.1)
Average precipitation mm (inches)	57.9 (2.28)	36.8 (1.45)	30.2 (1.19)	31.3 (1.23)	45.1 (1.78)	65.8 (2.59)	67.6 (2.66)	69.5 (2.74)	66.0 (2.60)	52.9 (2.08)	52.6 (2.07)	56.3 (2.22)	632 (24.89)
Average extreme snow depth cm (inches)	55 (22)	72 (28)	75 (30)	64 (25)	—	0 (0)	0 (0)	0 (0)	0 (0)	5 (2.0)	16 (6.3)	30 (12)	79 (31)
Mean monthly sunshine hours	21	78	172	225	289	305	310	245	154	92	38	3	1,932
Source 1: SMHI
Source 2: SMHI

Climate data for Rödkallen, (2002–2020 averages; extremes from available data since 1961; sunshine from Luleå 2002–2020)
Month	Jan	Feb	Mar	Apr	May	Jun	Jul	Aug	Sep	Oct	Nov	Dec	Year
Record high °C (°F)	7.1 (44.8)	7.0 (44.6)	6.9 (44.4)	10.2 (50.4)	21.9 (71.4)	26.2 (79.2)	28.9 (84.0)	25.0 (77.0)	19.2 (66.6)	13.3 (55.9)	10.0 (50.0)	5.6 (42.1)	28.9 (84.0)
Mean maximum °C (°F)	2.5 (36.5)	2.6 (36.7)	4.2 (39.6)	7.3 (45.1)	15.7 (60.3)	20.1 (68.2)	22.4 (72.3)	21.1 (70.0)	16.5 (61.7)	11.1 (52.0)	6.4 (43.5)	3.8 (38.8)	23.4 (74.1)
Mean daily maximum °C (°F)	−3.4 (25.9)	−4.1 (24.6)	−1.4 (29.5)	2.6 (36.7)	8.3 (46.9)	14.2 (57.6)	18.1 (64.6)	17.2 (63.0)	12.8 (55.0)	6.7 (44.1)	2.5 (36.5)	−0.6 (30.9)	6.1 (42.9)
Daily mean °C (°F)	−6.1 (21.0)	−7.4 (18.7)	−4.7 (23.5)	0.2 (32.4)	5.9 (42.6)	12.0 (53.6)	16.2 (61.2)	15.5 (59.9)	11.1 (52.0)	5.1 (41.2)	0.8 (33.4)	−2.7 (27.1)	3.8 (38.9)
Mean daily minimum °C (°F)	−8.7 (16.3)	−10.6 (12.9)	−8.0 (17.6)	−2.3 (27.9)	3.4 (38.1)	9.8 (49.6)	14.2 (57.6)	13.7 (56.7)	9.4 (48.9)	3.5 (38.3)	−1.0 (30.2)	−4.8 (23.4)	1.5 (34.8)
Mean minimum °C (°F)	−20.9 (−5.6)	−22.3 (−8.1)	−17.7 (0.1)	−8.6 (16.5)	−1.3 (29.7)	5.6 (42.1)	10.4 (50.7)	9.2 (48.6)	4.1 (39.4)	−2.6 (27.3)	−7.4 (18.7)	−13.8 (7.2)	−25.3 (−13.5)
Record low °C (°F)	−38.0 (−36.4)	−33.1 (−27.6)	−27.0 (−16.6)	−19.7 (−3.5)	−9.0 (15.8)	1.7 (35.1)	6.5 (43.7)	5.6 (42.1)	−0.4 (31.3)	−10.3 (13.5)	−20.5 (−4.9)	−27.7 (−17.9)	−38.0 (−36.4)
Average precipitation mm (inches)	25.5 (1.00)	19.3 (0.76)	18.6 (0.73)	21.7 (0.85)	32.8 (1.29)	47.0 (1.85)	49.2 (1.94)	46.8 (1.84)	47.6 (1.87)	50.0 (1.97)	44.8 (1.76)	40.0 (1.57)	443.3 (17.43)
Mean monthly sunshine hours	21	78	172	225	289	305	310	245	154	92	38	3	1,932
Source 1: SMHI Open Data
Source 2: SMHI Open Data

Climate data for Haparanda (2002–2020; extremes since 1901)
Month	Jan	Feb	Mar	Apr	May	Jun	Jul	Aug	Sep	Oct	Nov	Dec	Year
Record high °C (°F)	8.4 (47.1)	7.8 (46.0)	10.3 (50.5)	18.5 (65.3)	28.8 (83.8)	31.4 (88.5)	33.6 (92.5)	29.7 (85.5)	24.0 (75.2)	17.0 (62.6)	11.5 (52.7)	7.0 (44.6)	33.6 (92.5)
Mean maximum °C (°F)	2.5 (36.5)	3.4 (38.1)	7.5 (45.5)	12.7 (54.9)	22.3 (72.1)	25.2 (77.4)	27.1 (80.8)	24.6 (76.3)	18.7 (65.7)	11.8 (53.2)	6.4 (43.5)	3.7 (38.7)	28.1 (82.6)
Mean daily maximum °C (°F)	−5.9 (21.4)	−5.1 (22.8)	−0.3 (31.5)	5.4 (41.7)	12.3 (54.1)	17.8 (64.0)	21.1 (70.0)	18.7 (65.7)	13.3 (55.9)	5.6 (42.1)	0.4 (32.7)	−2.4 (27.7)	6.7 (44.1)
Daily mean °C (°F)	−9.8 (14.4)	−9.1 (15.6)	−4.9 (23.2)	1.1 (34.0)	7.4 (45.3)	12.9 (55.2)	16.5 (61.7)	14.4 (57.9)	9.4 (48.9)	2.4 (36.3)	−2.4 (27.7)	−5.8 (21.6)	2.7 (36.8)
Mean daily minimum °C (°F)	−13.6 (7.5)	−13.1 (8.4)	−9.5 (14.9)	−3.3 (26.1)	2.5 (36.5)	8.0 (46.4)	11.8 (53.2)	10.1 (50.2)	5.5 (41.9)	−0.8 (30.6)	−5.1 (22.8)	−9.1 (15.6)	−1.4 (29.5)
Mean minimum °C (°F)	−27.6 (−17.7)	−27.3 (−17.1)	−22.3 (−8.1)	−12.1 (10.2)	−4.3 (24.3)	1.8 (35.2)	5.3 (41.5)	2.0 (35.6)	−2.5 (27.5)	−10.1 (13.8)	−16.0 (3.2)	−21.5 (−6.7)	−29.7 (−21.5)
Record low °C (°F)	−40.8 (−41.4)	−41.7 (−43.1)	−37.5 (−35.5)	−26.0 (−14.8)	−10.5 (13.1)	−1.5 (29.3)	2.2 (36.0)	−1.8 (28.8)	−8.1 (17.4)	−23.0 (−9.4)	−32.3 (−26.1)	−37.3 (−35.1)	−41.7 (−43.1)
Average precipitation mm (inches)	56.5 (2.22)	44.9 (1.77)	35.8 (1.41)	32.4 (1.28)	45.5 (1.79)	52.8 (2.08)	60.7 (2.39)	57.2 (2.25)	64.8 (2.55)	59.2 (2.33)	68.9 (2.71)	63.6 (2.50)	642.3 (25.28)
Average extreme snow depth cm (inches)	47 (19)	67 (26)	76 (30)	62 (24)	7 (2.8)	0 (0)	0 (0)	0 (0)	0 (0)	4 (1.6)	13 (5.1)	26 (10)	77 (30)
Source 1: SMHI Open Data
Source 2: SMHI Monthly Data

Climate data for Oulu, 1981–2010 normals, records 1921 – present
Month	Jan	Feb	Mar	Apr	May	Jun	Jul	Aug	Sep	Oct	Nov	Dec	Year
Record high °C (°F)	9.3 (48.7)	7.8 (46.0)	11.5 (52.7)	23.9 (75.0)	29.9 (85.8)	32.3 (90.1)	33.3 (91.9)	30.5 (86.9)	25.4 (77.7)	20.5 (68.9)	11.2 (52.2)	8.2 (46.8)	33.3 (91.9)
Mean daily maximum °C (°F)	−6 (21)	−5.7 (21.7)	−0.9 (30.4)	5.6 (42.1)	12.5 (54.5)	17.9 (64.2)	20.9 (69.6)	18.3 (64.9)	12.5 (54.5)	5.8 (42.4)	−0.4 (31.3)	−4 (25)	6.4 (43.5)
Daily mean °C (°F)	−9.6 (14.7)	−9.3 (15.3)	−4.8 (23.4)	1.4 (34.5)	7.8 (46.0)	13.5 (56.3)	16.5 (61.7)	14.1 (57.4)	8.9 (48.0)	3.3 (37.9)	−2.8 (27.0)	−7.1 (19.2)	2.7 (36.8)
Mean daily minimum °C (°F)	−13.6 (7.5)	−13.3 (8.1)	−8.8 (16.2)	−2.6 (27.3)	3.3 (37.9)	9.0 (48.2)	12.2 (54.0)	10.1 (50.2)	5.4 (41.7)	0.8 (33.4)	−5.5 (22.1)	−10.8 (12.6)	−1.2 (29.9)
Record low °C (°F)	−37.5 (−35.5)	−41.5 (−42.7)	−32 (−26)	−21.4 (−6.5)	−9.1 (15.6)	−6.1 (21.0)	3.6 (38.5)	−1.5 (29.3)	−8 (18)	−20.6 (−5.1)	−33 (−27)	−37.2 (−35.0)	−41.5 (−42.7)
Average precipitation mm (inches)	31 (1.2)	26 (1.0)	26 (1.0)	20 (0.8)	37 (1.5)	46 (1.8)	71 (2.8)	65 (2.6)	44 (1.7)	45 (1.8)	36 (1.4)	30 (1.2)	477 (18.8)
Average precipitation days	10	8	8	6	7	7	9	10	9	10	11	10	105
Average relative humidity (%) (daily average)	87	86	82	73	67	66	71	76	82	86	90	89	80
Mean monthly sunshine hours	24	69	137	208	273	296	283	212	133	69	28	8	1,740
Source 1: FMI
Source 2: FMI (record highs and lows 1961–present) FMI(record highs and lows 1921–1961)

== Ecology ==
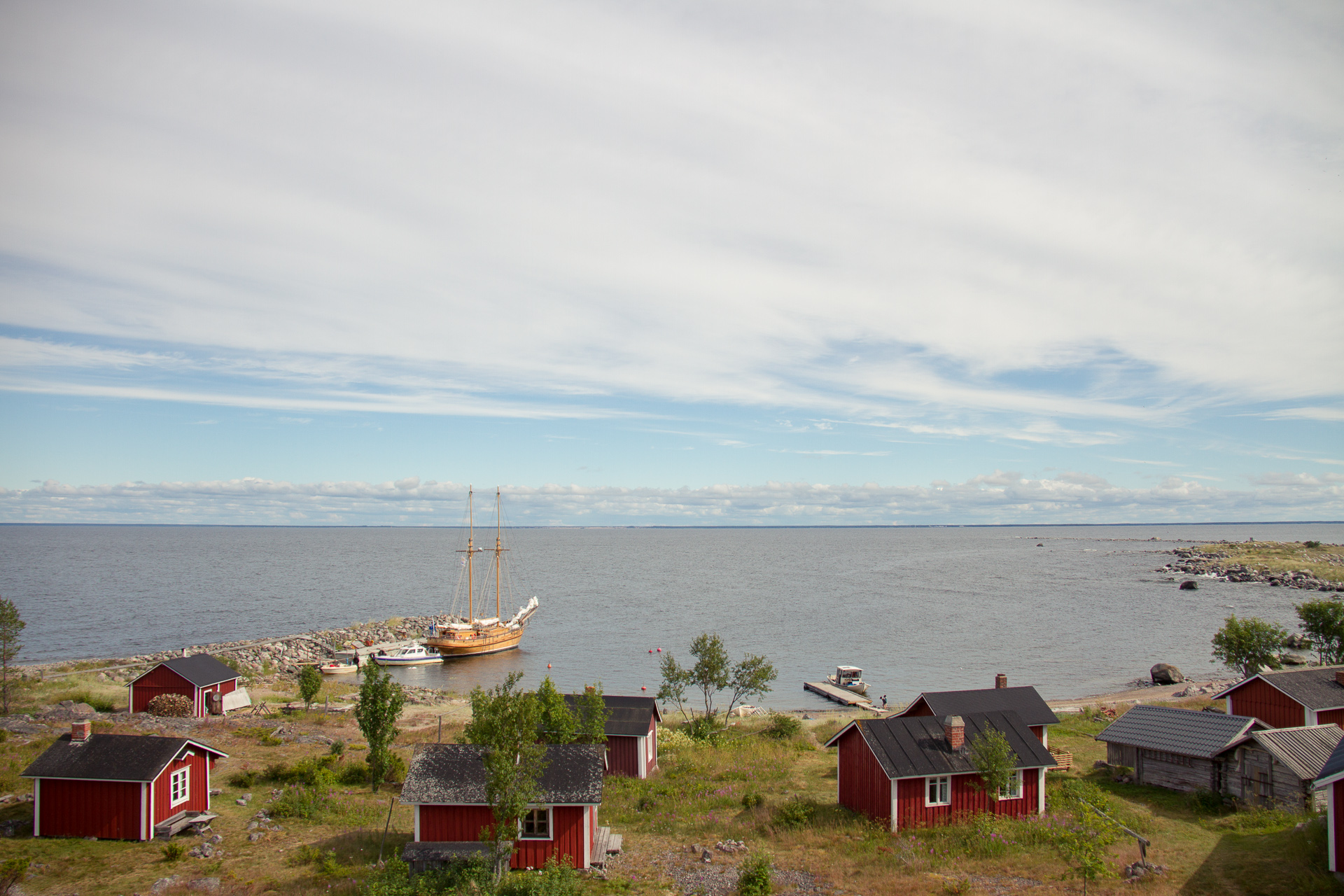
A fishing village of the Kallankari Islands, part of Kalajoki

The Quark ridge at the south of the bay defines the dividing line beyond which many salt water species are unable to survive. Instead of the red and brown algae found further south, the bay has predominantly green algae and phanerogams. Annual plant species are almost completely dominant. The only perennials are a few specimens of the freshwater cryptogam Isoetes echinospora and the moss Fontinalis dalecarlica. Often the green algae have a dense covering of epiphytic diatoms. The shores, beaches and shallows include a variety of northern plant species including the endemic yellow hair grass (Deschampsia bottnica).

The only filter feeders are Ephydatia and, at the river mouths, small numbers of freshwater mussels. Bivalves make up 9% of animal biomass. Crustaceans, mostly Saduria entomon make up 45% and gastropoda 30%. The gastropoda are grazing snails related to freshwater species.

Fish species found in the area's lakes and rivers also live in the bay, including roach, perch, pike and grayling.

Ringed seal, grey seal, cod, herring and salmon may also be found in the bay. In the 16th century seals were hunted in the Bay of Bothnia. Ringed seals were captured using nets in the inshore open water, and were stalked and captured in their dens or at breathing holes. Both grey and ringed seals were hunted along the edge of the ice. Wild vendace roe harvested from the Kalix River, known as Kalix Löjrom or as sea gold, is a delicacy with a European protected designation of origin.

Birdlife includes the black guillemot, velvet scoter, oystercatcher, lesser black-backed gull, western capercaillie and willow ptarmigan. Moose and hare are found on the islands, as on the mainland.

Occasionally, whales have been observed in the Bothnian Sea and remains of extinct Atlantic gray whale was found from Gräsö while it is not clear whether or not whales might once have reached Bothnian Bay historically.

== Population ==
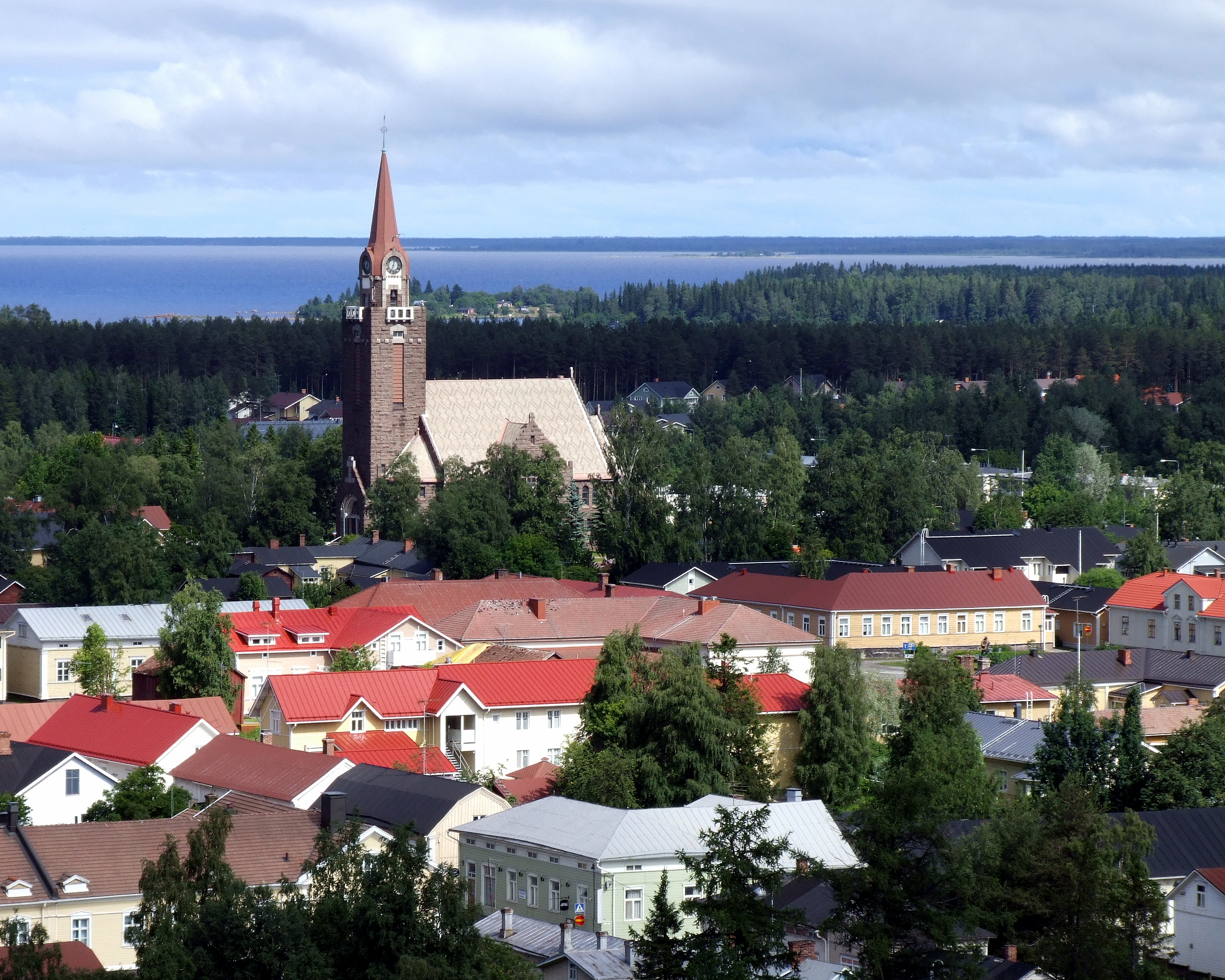
Old Raahe, Finland

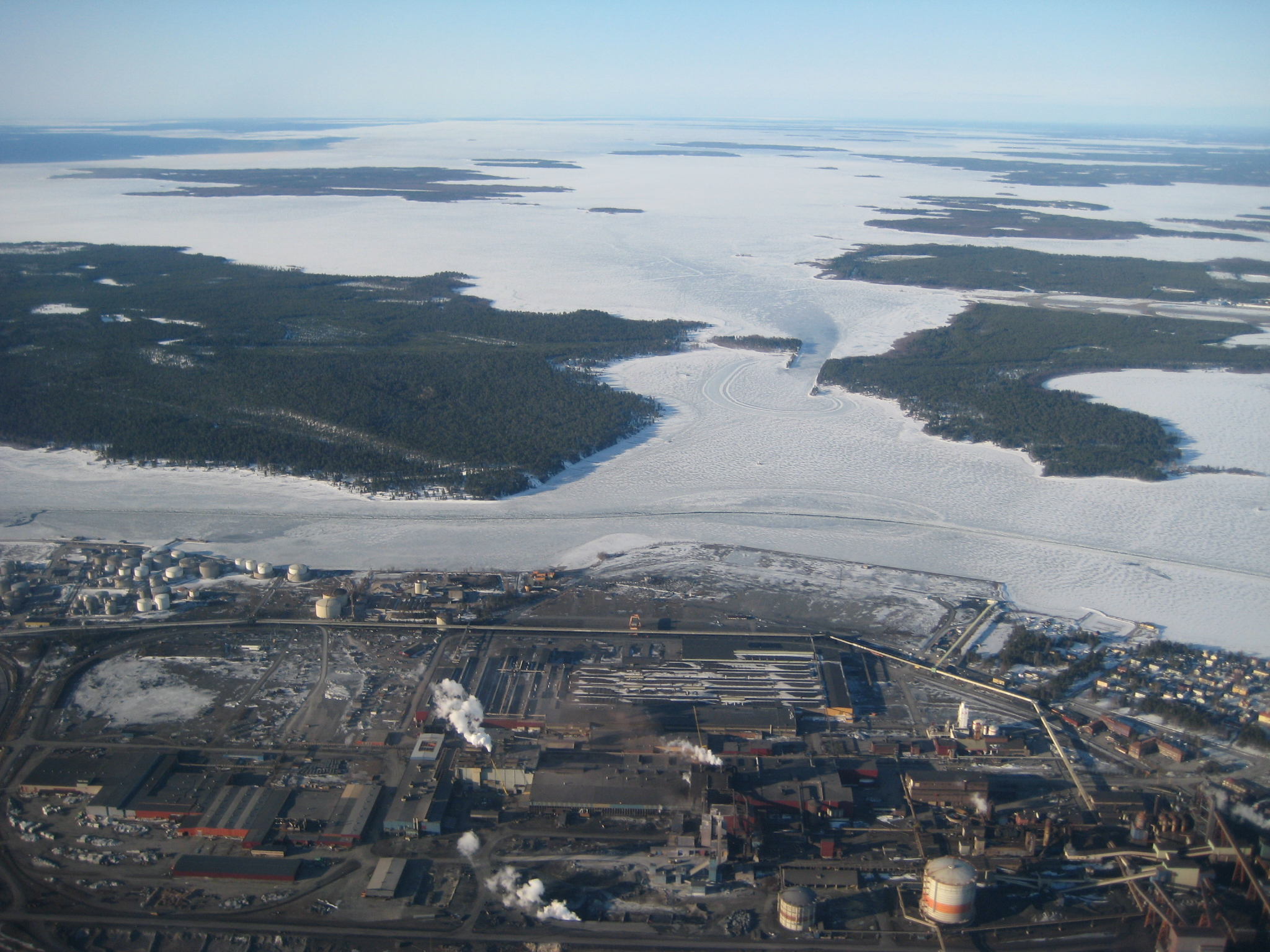
Industrial zone in Luleå

Ports on the Finnish side include Haukipudas, Jakobstad, Kemi, Kokkola, Oulu, Raahe and Tornio. The largest towns by population on the Finnish side as of 2013 were Oulu (192,680), Tornio (22,374), Kemi (22,157), Kempele (16,549), Raahe (25,641), Kalajoki (12,637), Kokkola (46,697) and Jakobstad (19,636). In Finland the catchment area included about 544,000 hectares (1,340,000 acres) of arable land as of 1993. There were four Finnish pulp and paper mills, of which two (Veitsiluoto Oy and Metsä Botnia Oy) were producing bleached kraft paper.

On the Swedish side ports include Haparanda, Karlsborg, Kalix, Luleå, Piteå and Skellefteå. The largest towns on the Swedish side as of 2013 were Luleå (74,000), Skellefteå (71,641), Piteå (40,860) and Kalix (16,926). Luleå is the largest city in Norrbotten, with the largest airport. The 1,312 islands of the Luleå archipelago are an important tourist attraction, as is the Gammelstad church village, listed as a Unesco World Heritage site. As of 1993 there were about 113,000 hectares (280,000 acres) of arable land in the Swedish part of the catchment basin, mostly used for small-scale low-intensity farming. There were five pulp and paper mills, of which one produced bleached kraft paper.

In the late 1960s the bay was being used to transport fuel oil to the Finnish settlements around the bay. In 1968 about 950,000 tons of cellulose and 230,600 tons of paper and cardboard were exported, a figure that was rising. In 1968 ships calling at the Finnish ports carried about 388,872 tons of iron bars and 64,326 tons of steel sheets. Mining and mineral products such as coal and ore were carried to and from the ports, and steel products were exported. Sea transport continued throughout the winter. In 1993 there were two non-ferrous heavy metal smelters, in Rönnskär and Kokkola, emitting significant quantities of heavy metals. Efforts were being made to reduce emissions. The drainage basin also held three iron and steel plants and a number of mines.

Human activities have affected the fragile sub-arctic environment. Dredging and other activities related to sea transport affect marine life. Agriculture, forestry and peat mining in the catchment basin add nutrients to the bay, affecting the ecological balance, while pollutants are delivered from steel mills and from pulp and paper mills around the bay, as well as from sewage treatment plants. Steel mills and stainless steel plants may have released nickel and chromium. Efforts have been made to reduce pollution through improved technology, but some areas along the Finnish coastline show evidence of eutrophication. Compared to other parts of the Baltic, higher levels of nitrate have been found in the Bothnian Bay and lower levels of phosphate and silicates.

== Gallery ==
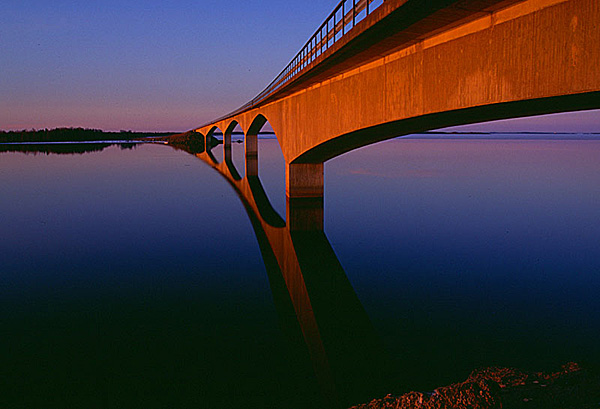
The bridge to Seskarö, Sweden

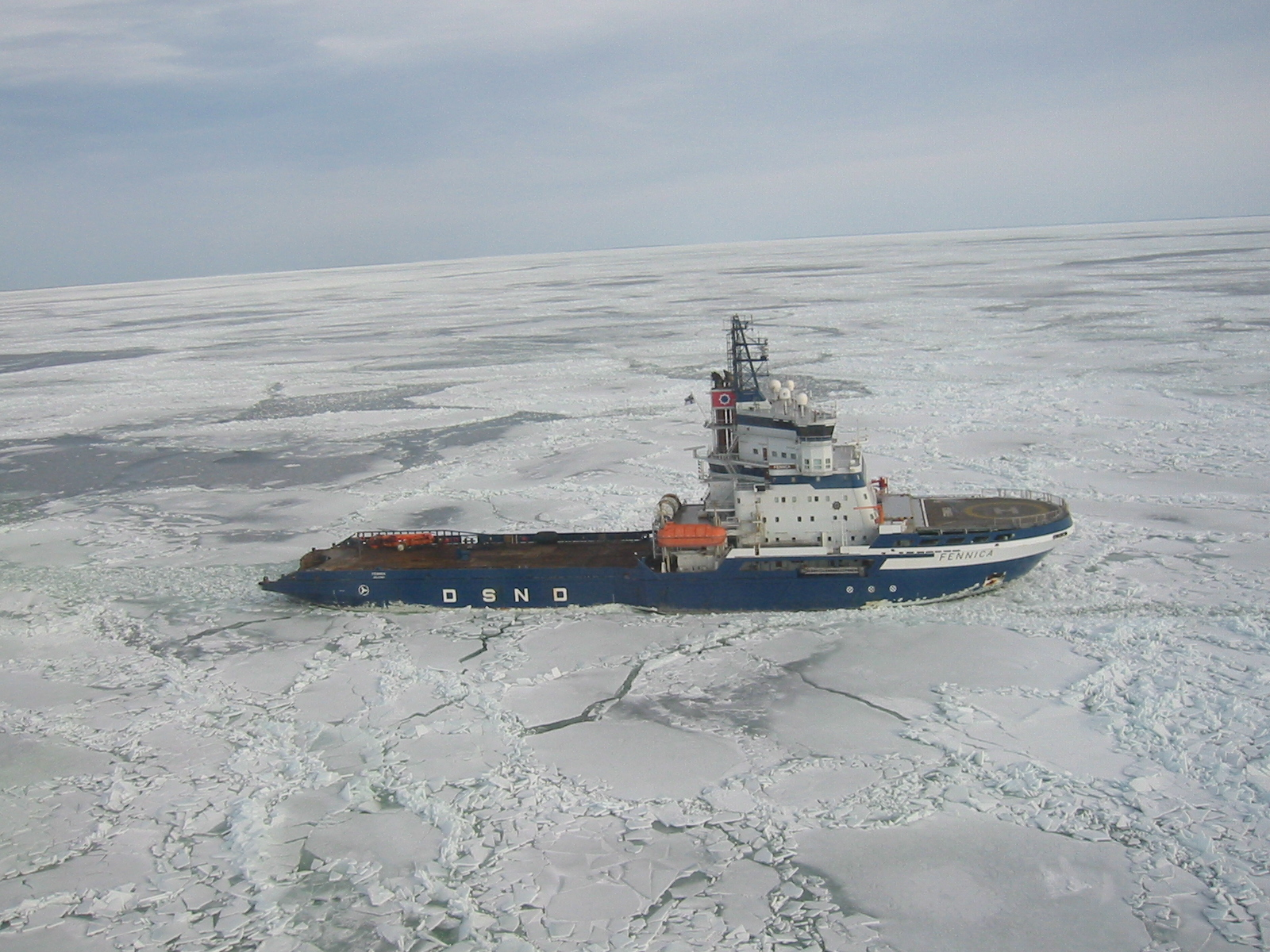
Finnish icebreaker MSV Fennica in the Bay

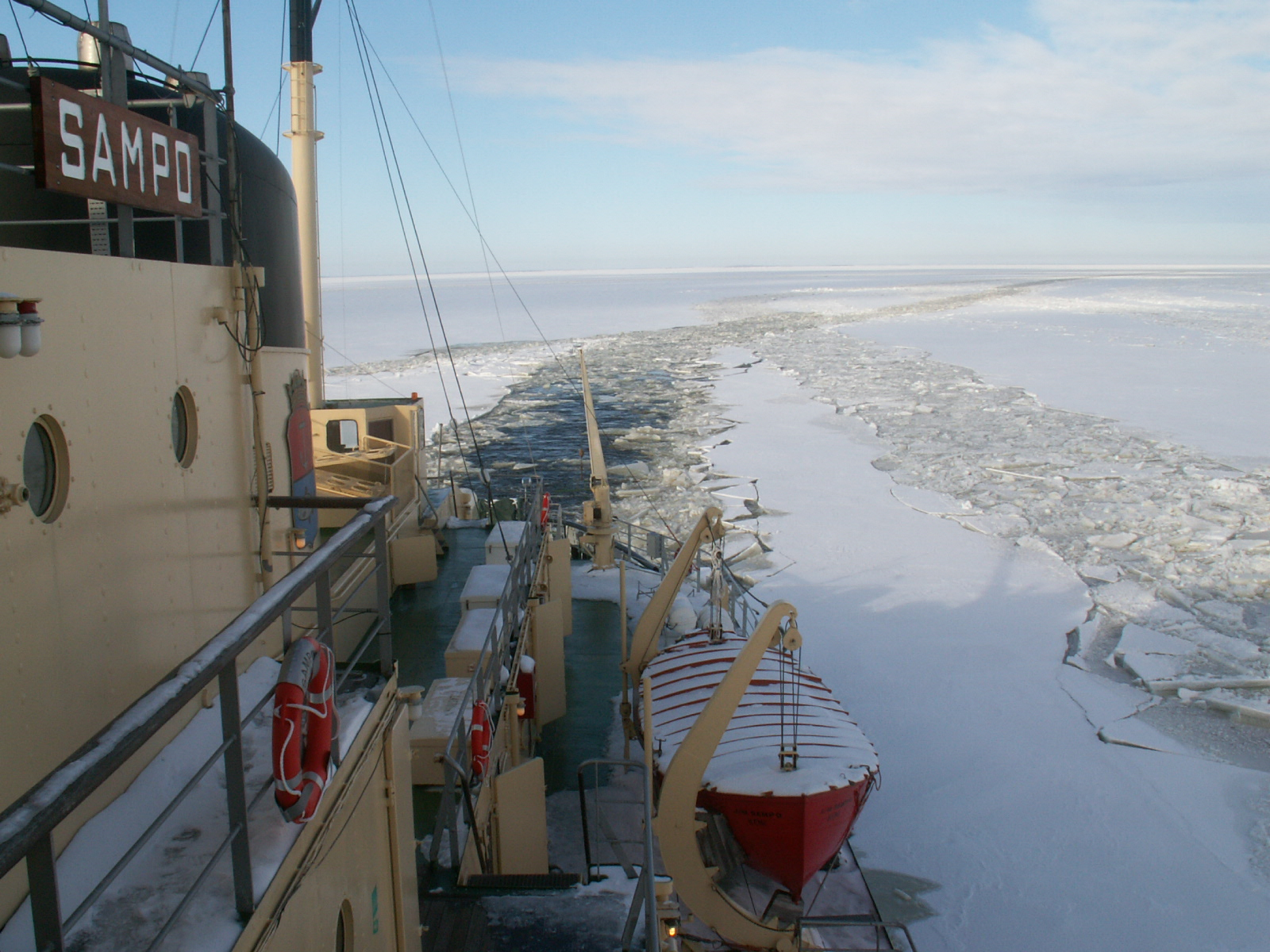
Looking back from the Icebreaker Sampo near Kemi, Finland

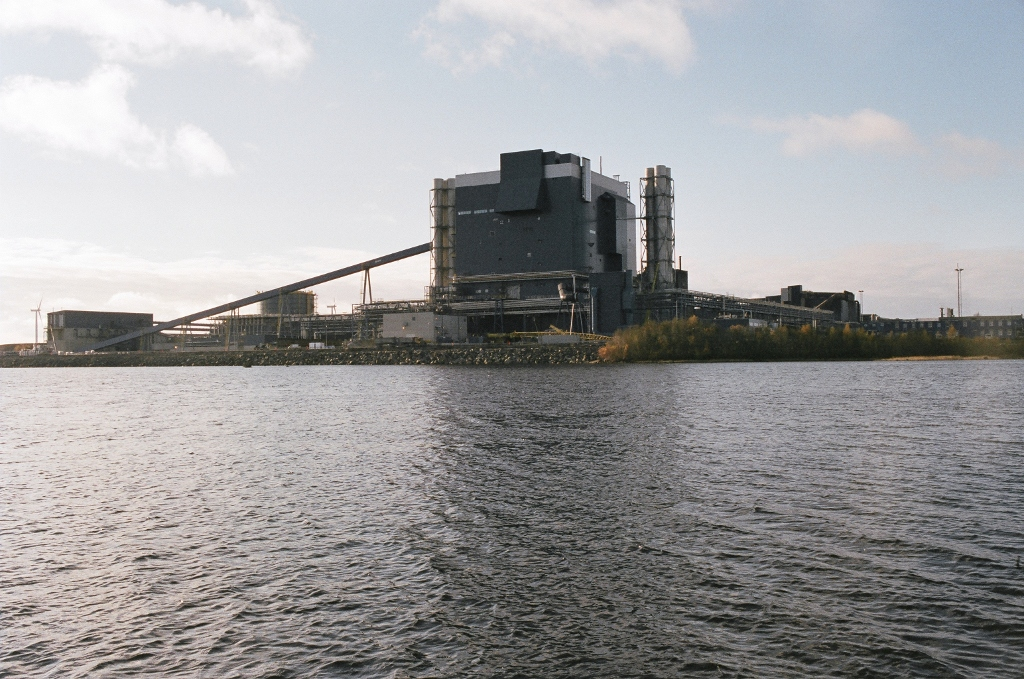
Outokumpu mill in Tornio

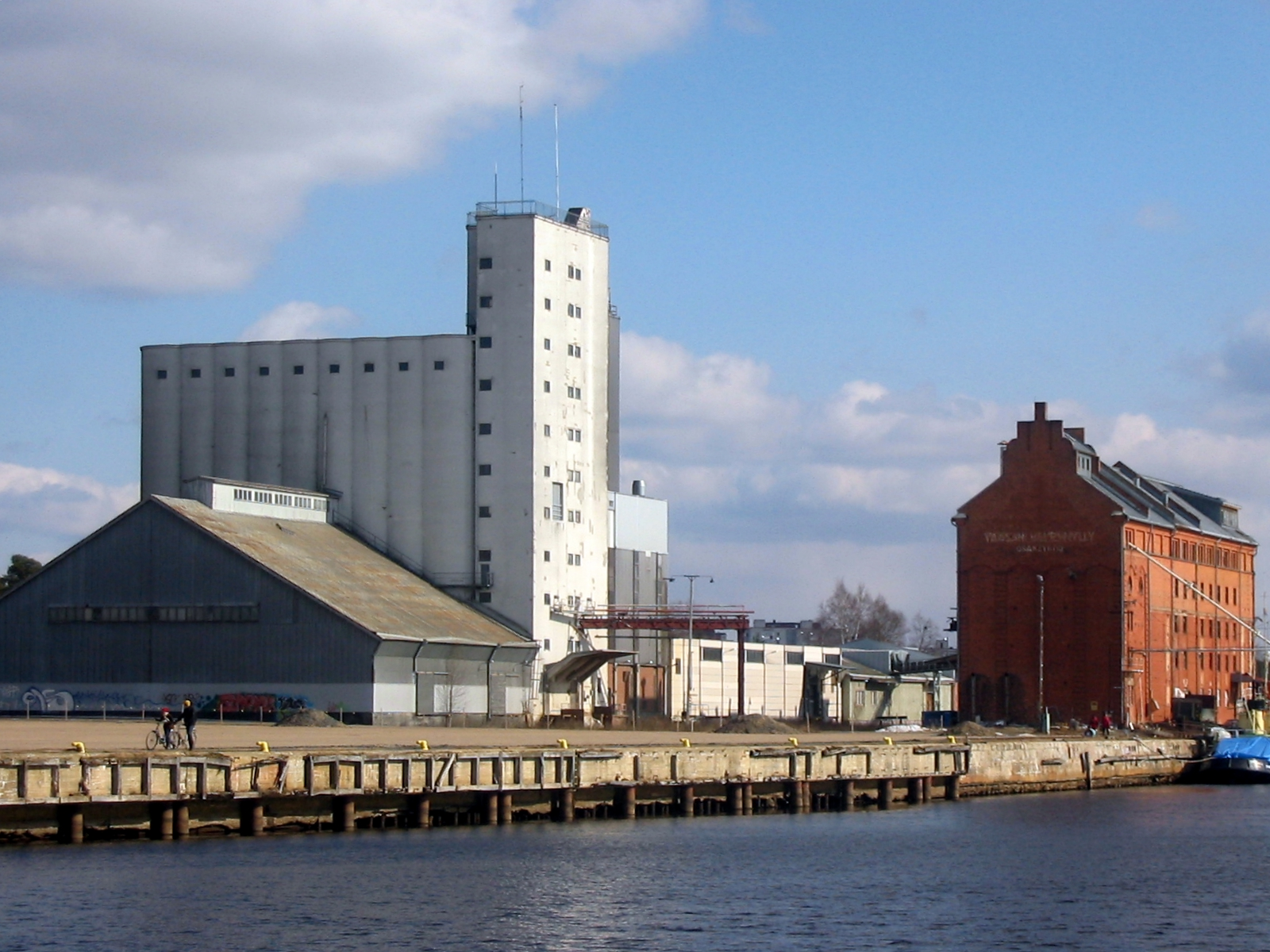
Old mill buildings and harbour in Toppila, Oulu, Finland

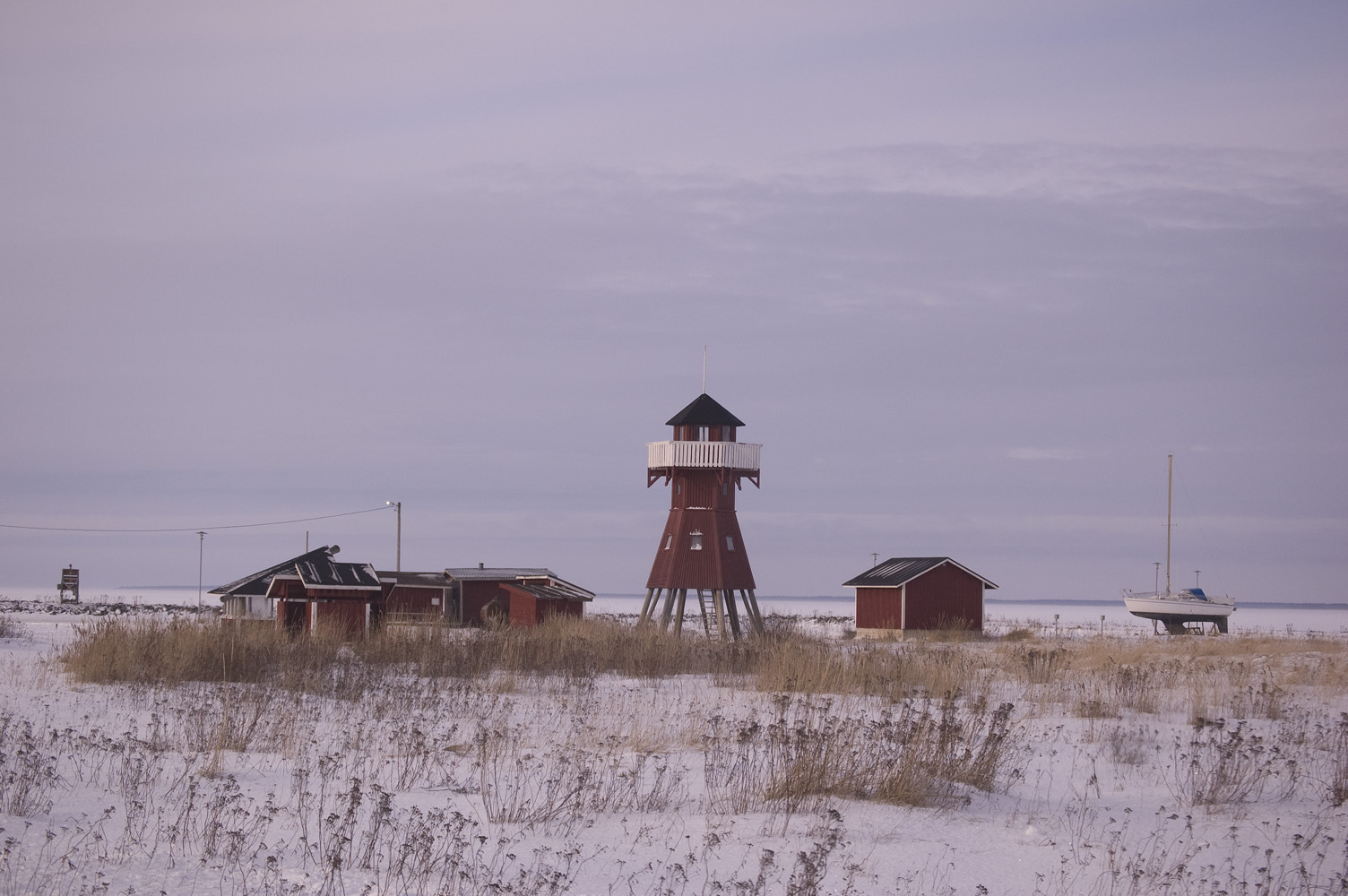
Buildings and the birdwatching tower at Varessäikkä harbour, Siikajoki, Finland

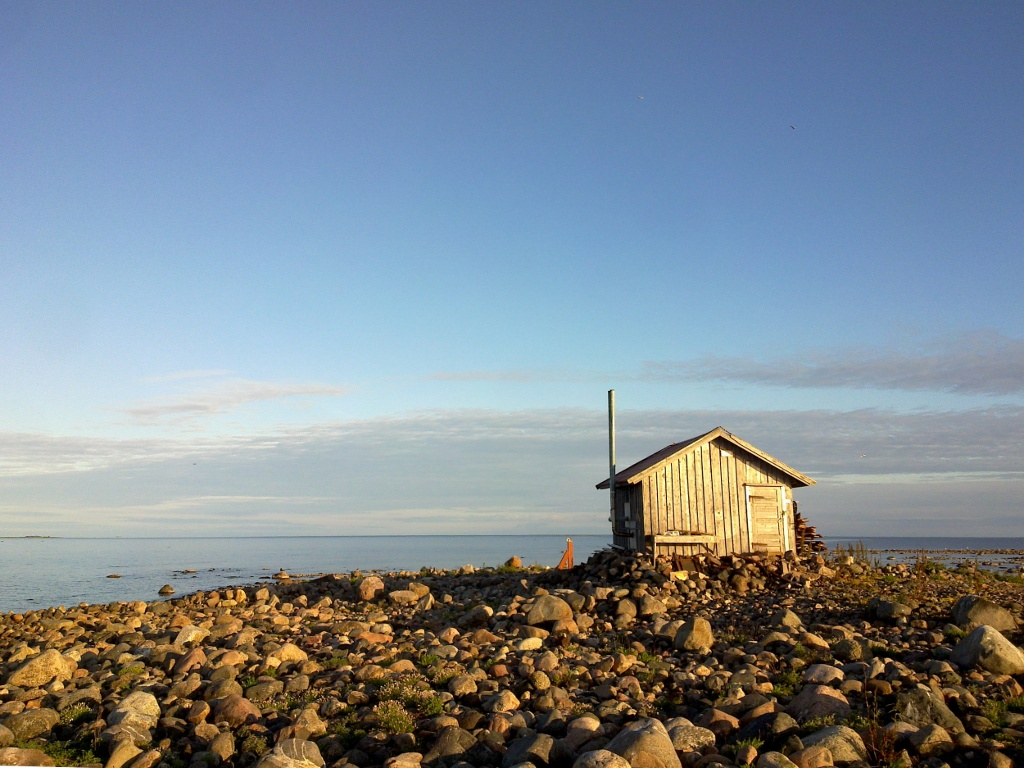
Old fisherman's cottage

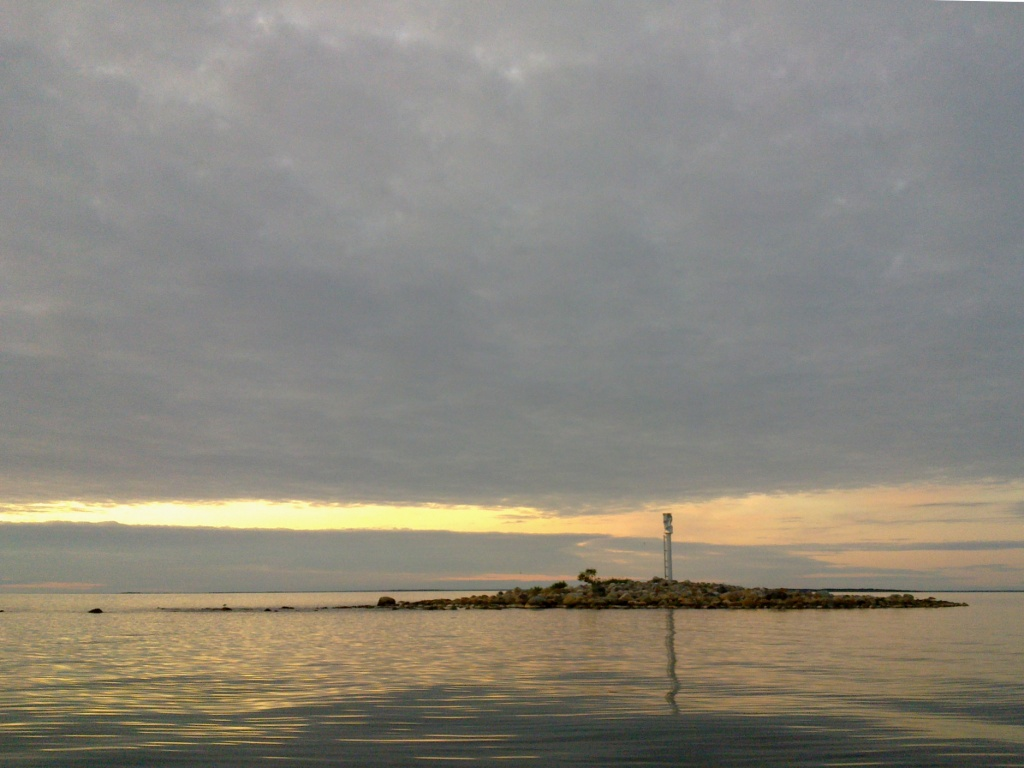
Lönkytin island

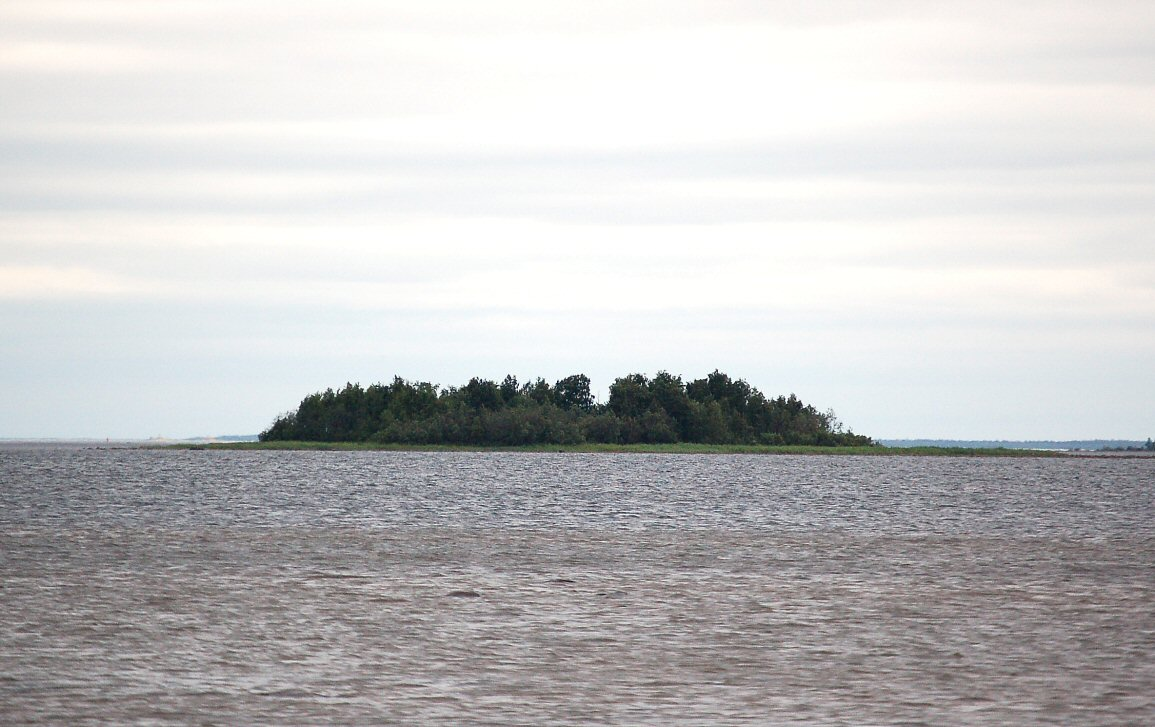
The island of Kahvankari in Oulu, Finland

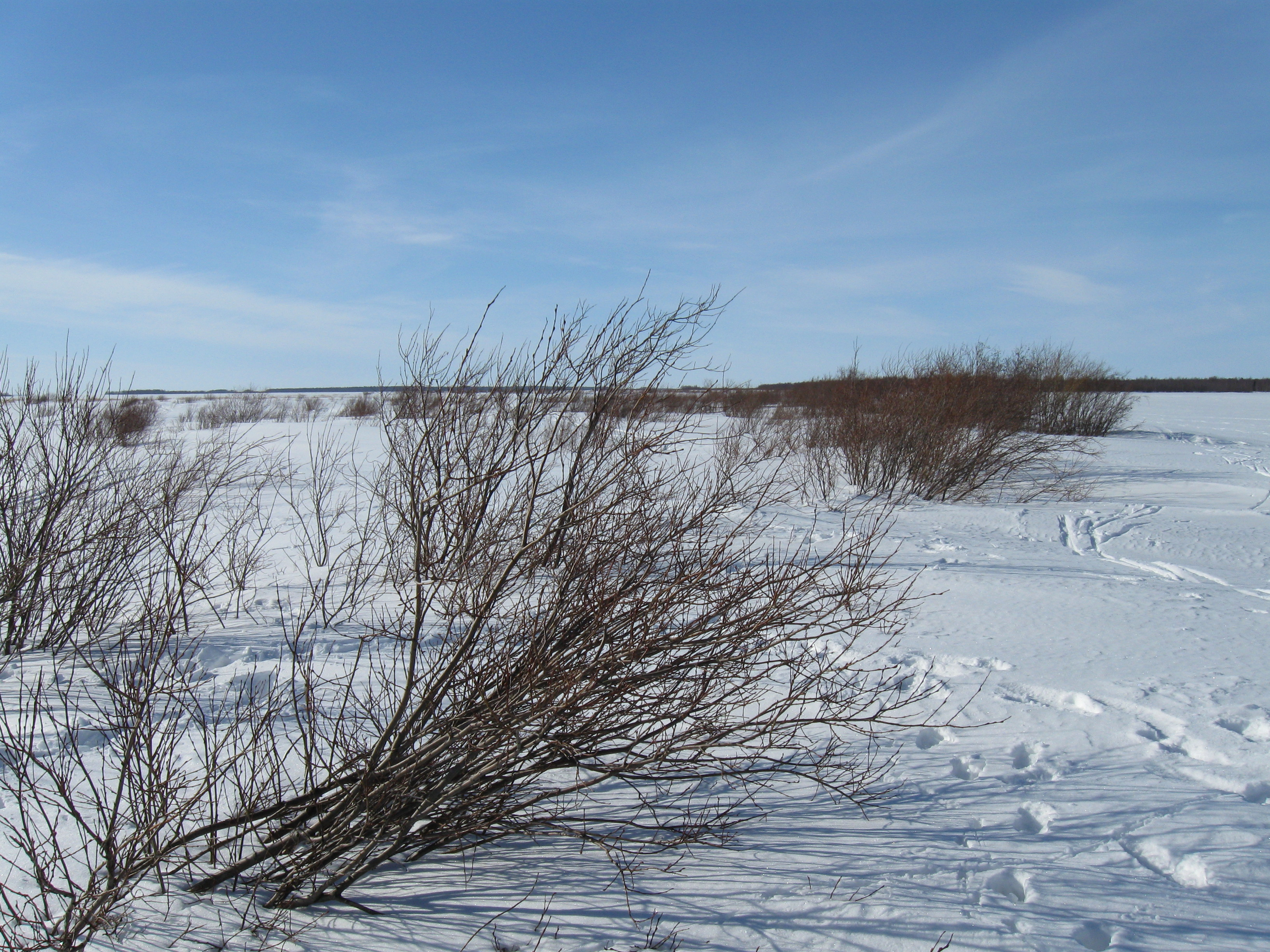
The eastern shore of the Kellon Kraaseli island, Haukipudas, Finland

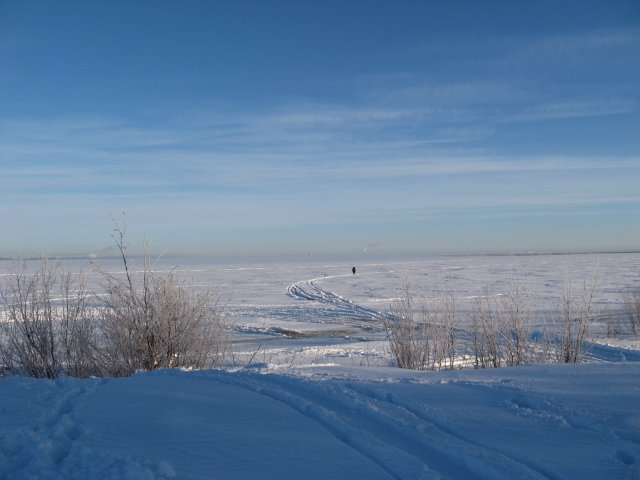
Bothnian Bay in Kemi, Finland

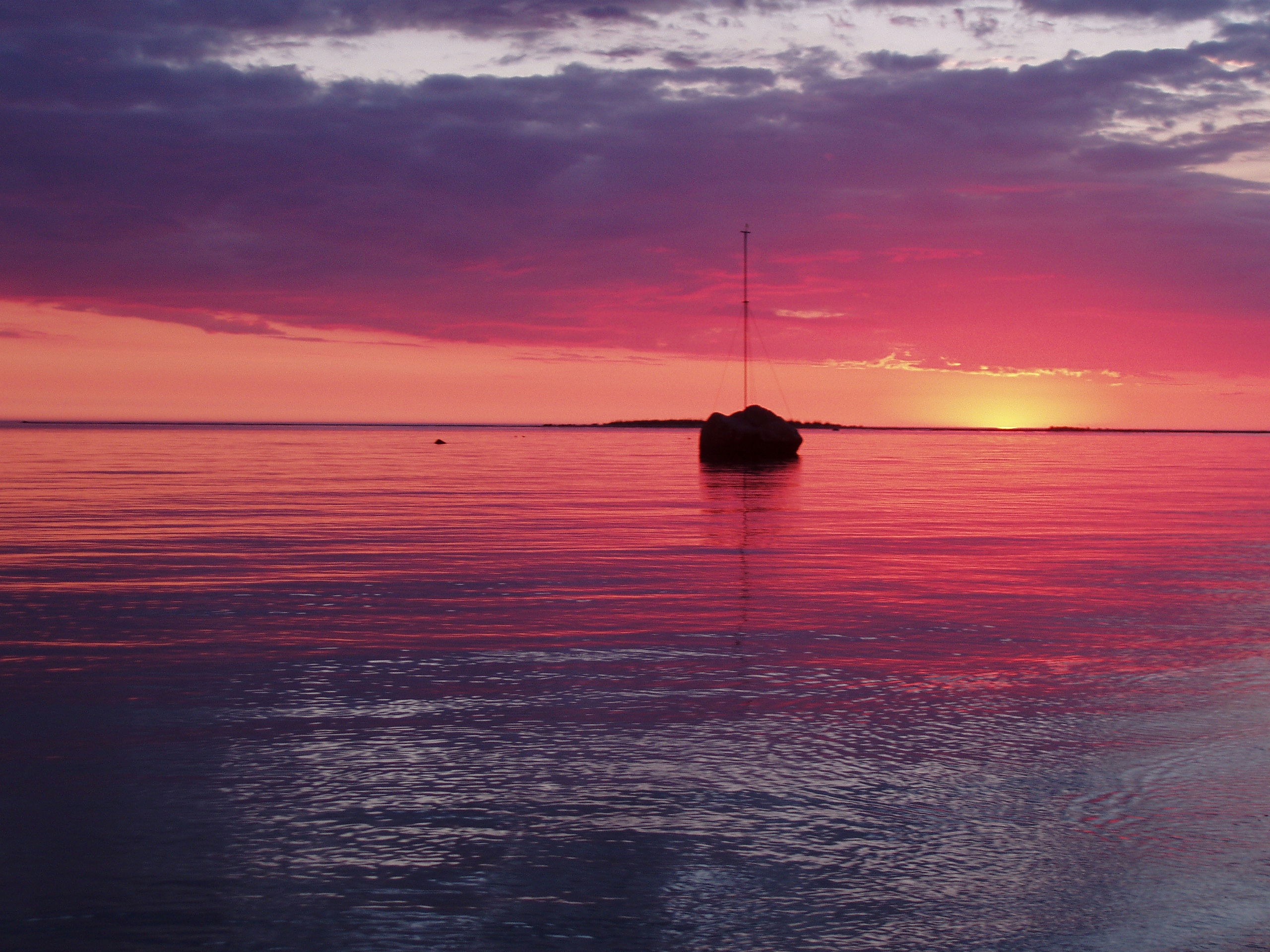
Sunset at Hiekkasärkät, Kalajoki, Finland
