= Ohtakari =

- Location within Finland

Geography
- Coordinates: 64°5.428′N 23°24.315′E
- Adjacent to: Bay of Bothnia

Administration
- Finland
- Region: Northern Ostrobothnia
- Municipality: Kokkola

Ohtakari is an island and community in the Finnish sector of the Bay of Bothnia.

== Description ==
Ohtakari is an island and fishing village of the Kokkola district in the former municipality of Lohtaja. Ohtakari is at the head of the Lohtaja Vattaja peninsula, connected by a causeway, the last island before the open sea. From Ohtakari to Lohtaja village is about 10 kilometres (6.2 mi). Ohtakari holds a fishing port, a fishing museum, a Lutheran Evangelical Association of Finland (Suomen Luterilainen Evankeliumiyhdistys ry, SLEY) camp and an old turf maze, or Troy Town. There is also a look-out tower and functioning lighthouse. An annual festival is held in the village.

== History ==
The oldest taxation records of Ohtakari date to the 1500s. Fishermen lived on the island during the best fishing period. The island also served as a pilot's station for more than a hundred years. The work of the fishermen in the old days is presented in the fishing museum. The causeway leading to the island was completed in the 1970s.

== Distances ==
- Lohtaja village - about 10 kilometres (6.2 mi)
- Kokkola - about 45 kilometres (28 mi)
- Himanka - about 20 kilometres (12 mi)

== Gallery ==
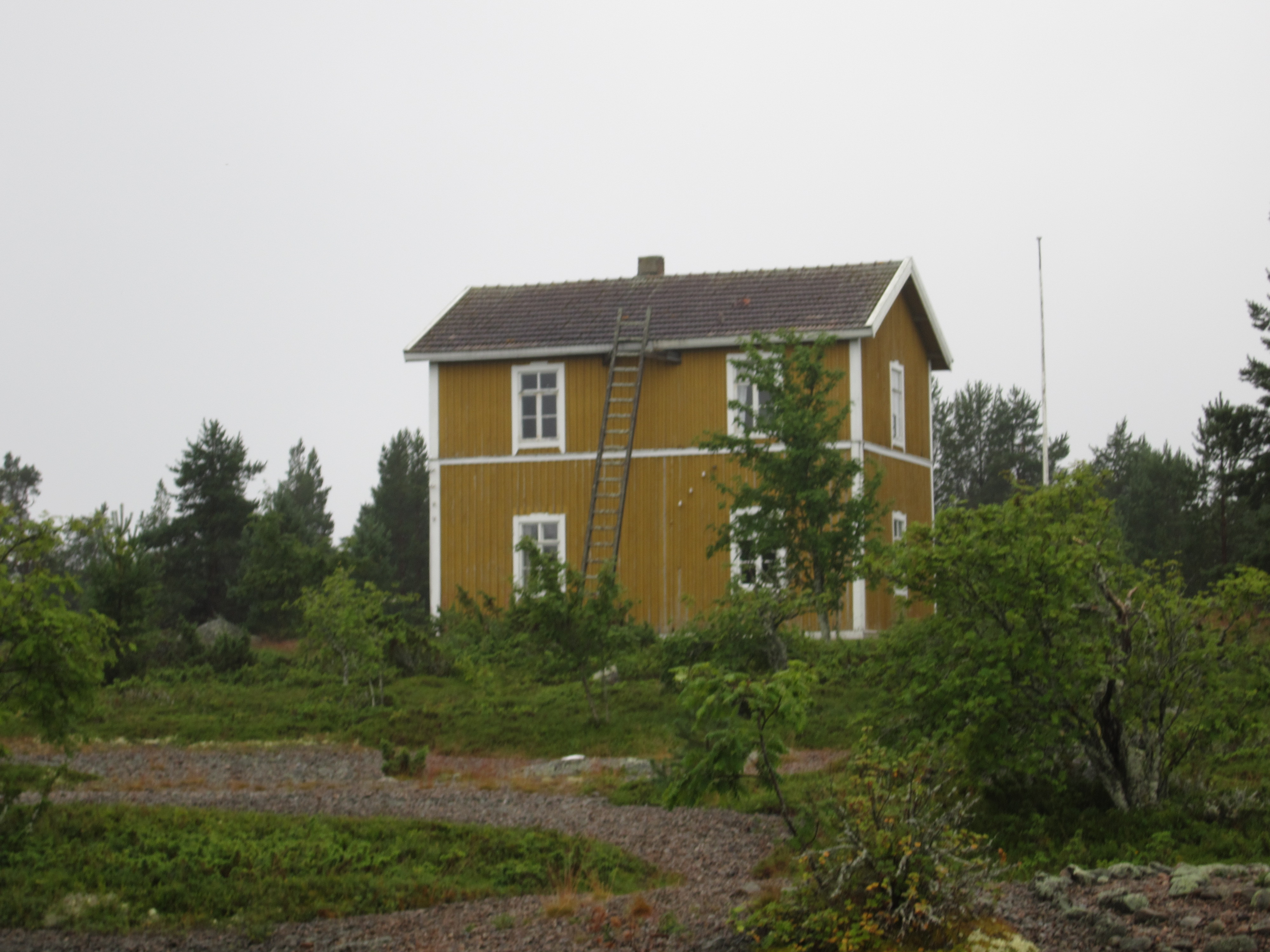
The pilot's house on the island

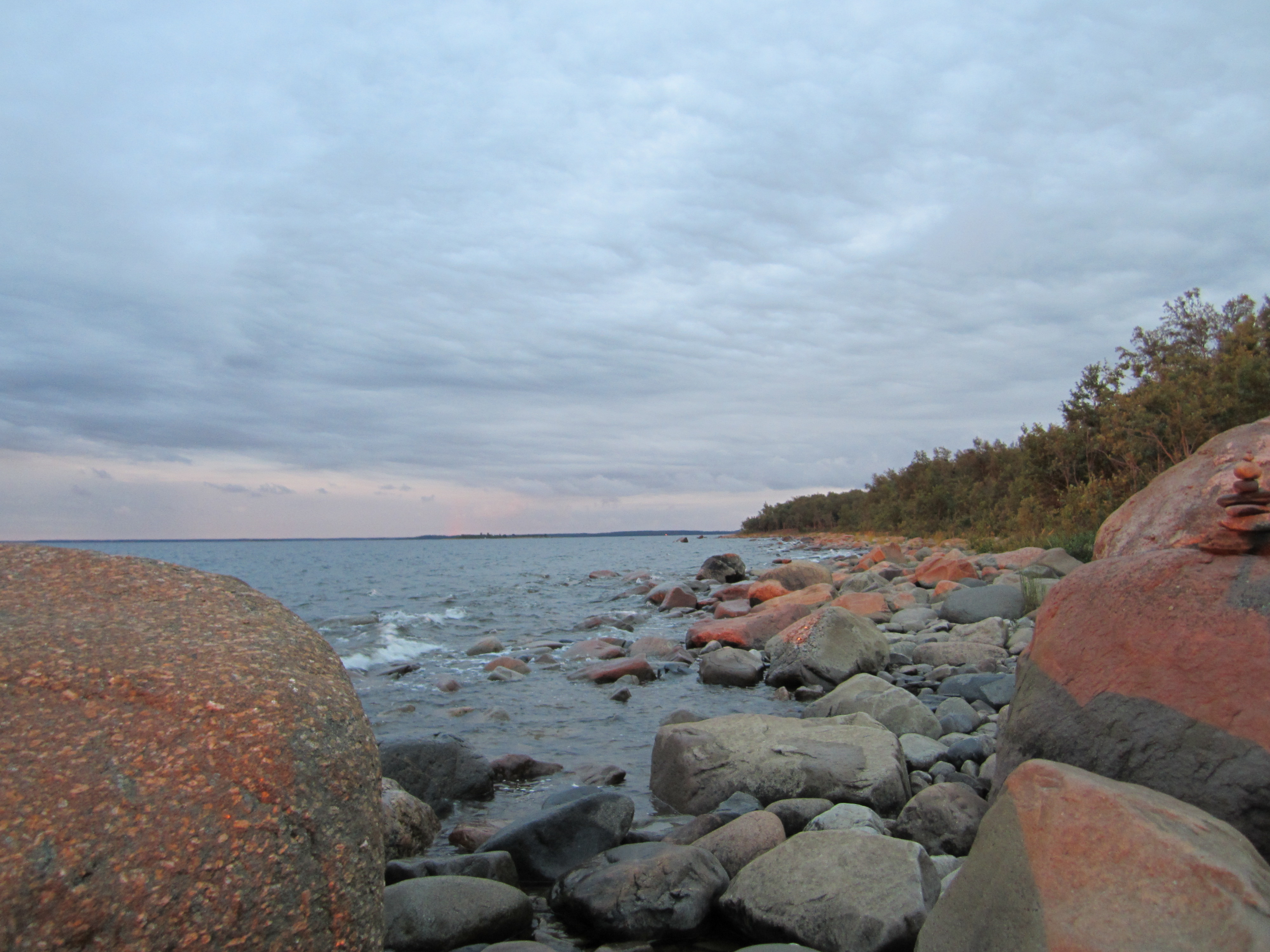
Ohtakari's rocky shoreline
