= South Kvarken =

Stretch of sea between Finnish Åland and Sweden

Coordinates: 60.1492°N 19.1725°E

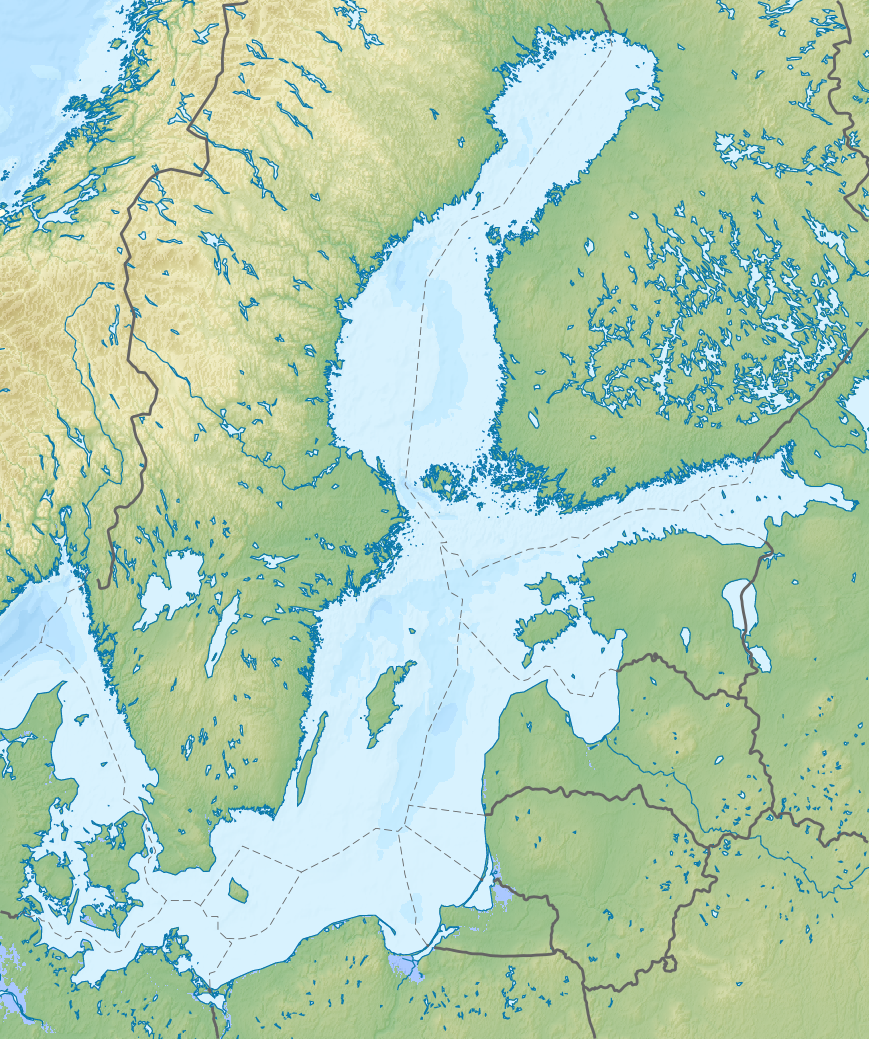
Location of South Kvarken

South Kvarken (Finnish: Ahvenanrauma, Swedish: Södra Kvarken) is the narrowest stretch of sea between Finnish Åland and Sweden, forming a strait connecting the Sea of Åland and the Bothnian Sea of approximately 30 km (18.5 mi) across.
