= Sea of Åland =

Sea between the Åland islands and the Swedish mainland

Coordinates: 60°10′N 019°10′E

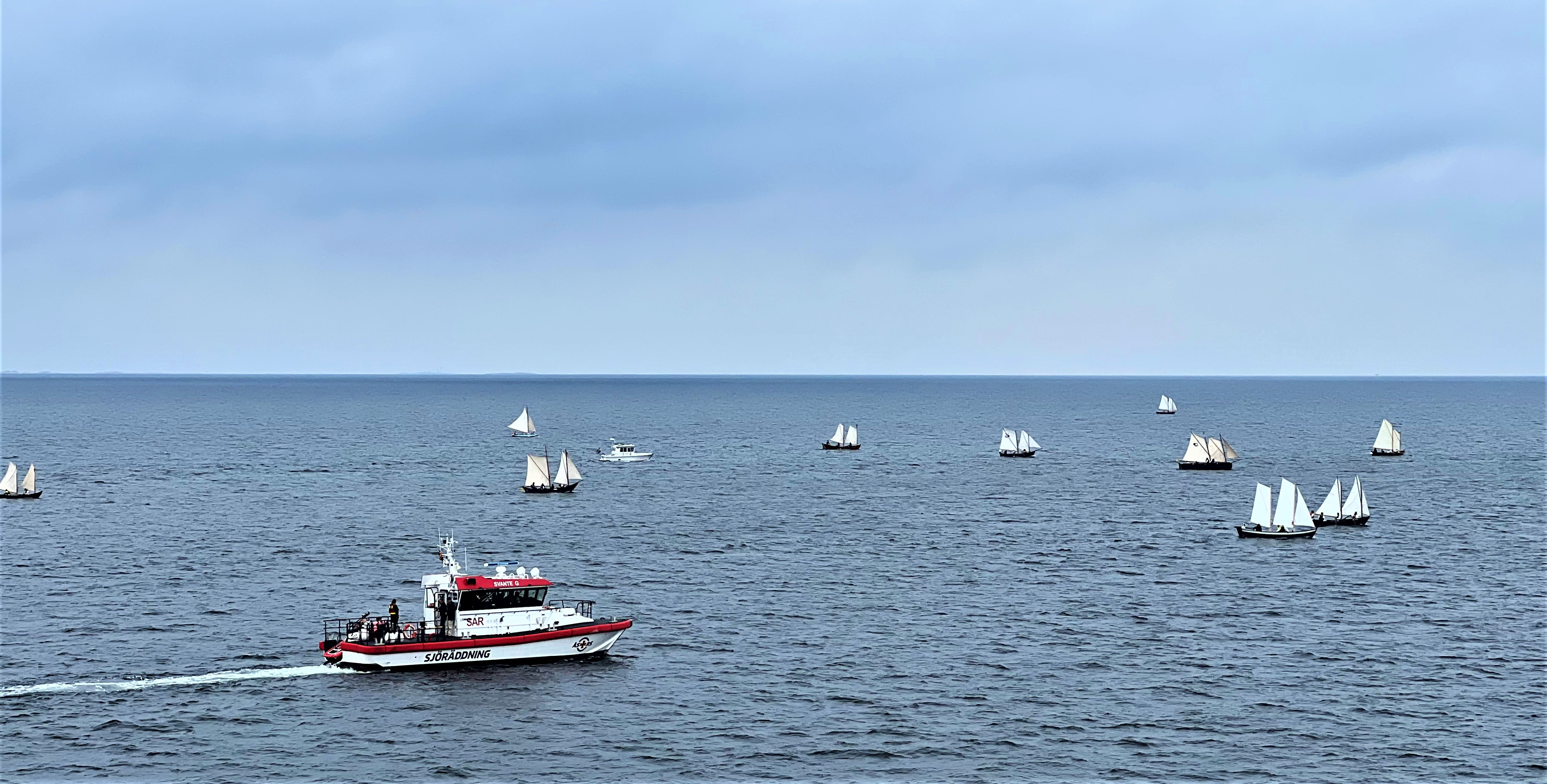
Boat race Postrodden between Grisslehamn and Eckerö 2022, with Rescue Svante G bottom left

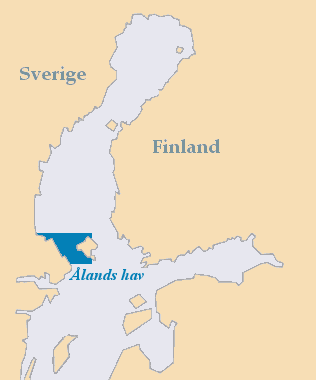
Sea of Åland

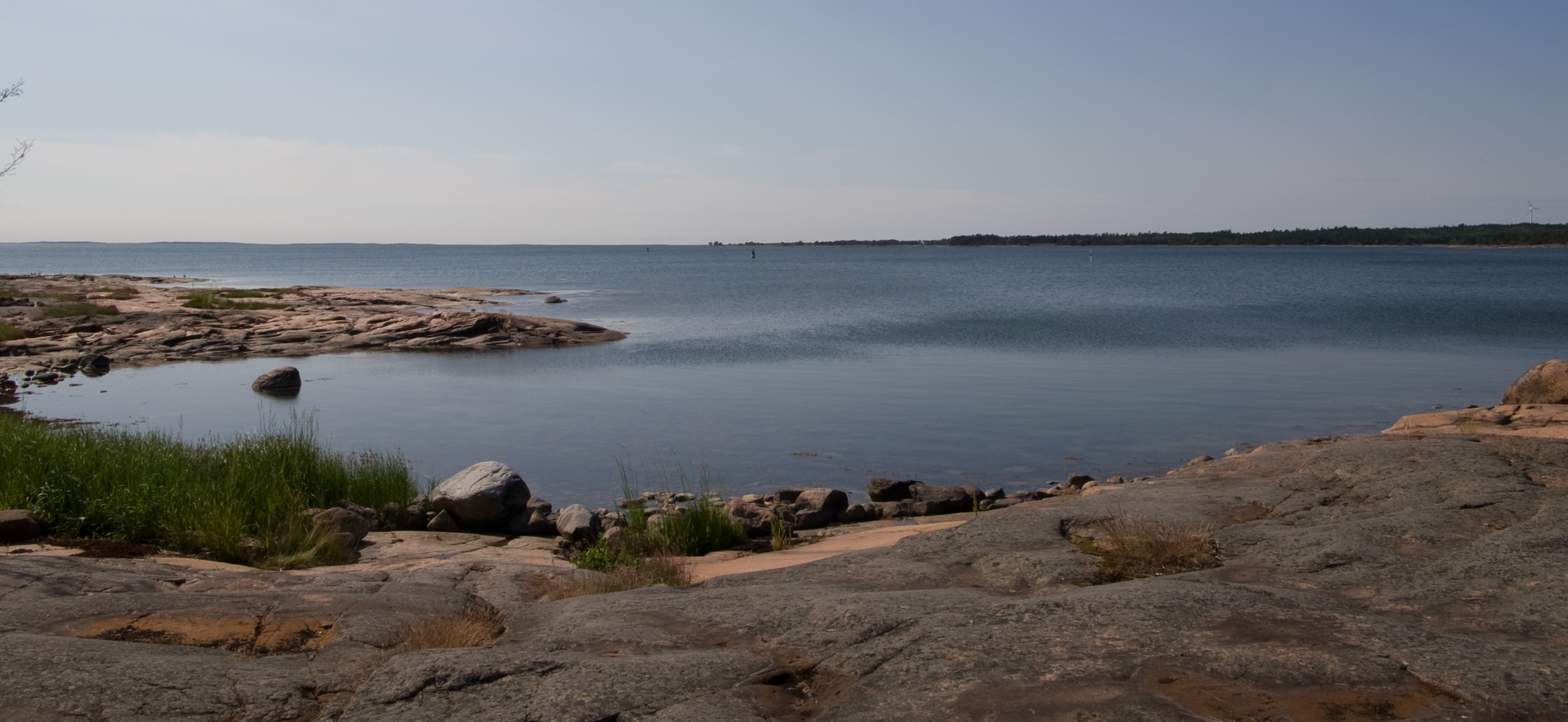
The Sea of Åland, seen from Eckerö island

The Åland Sea (or the Sea of Åland; Swedish: Ålands hav, Finnish: Ahvenanmeri) is a waterway in the southern Gulf of Bothnia, between Åland and Sweden. It connects the Bothnian Sea with the Baltic Sea proper. The western part of the basin is in Swedish territorial waters while the eastern part is in Finnish territorial waters.

The Åland Sea has two sub-basins. The main basin is the Åland Sea proper, also called the northern Åland Sea basin. In the south, there is the smaller Lågskär Deep, also called the Lågskär Basin or the southern Åland Sea basin. The narrowest part on the northern edge of the basin is the South Kvarken (Swedish: Södra Kvarken, Finnish: Ahvenanrauma). The trench running on the bottom of the Sea of Åland contains the second-deepest spot of the Baltic Sea, at a depth of 301 meters, which is second only to Landsort Deep. The mean depth of Åland Sea is 75 m, area 5,477 km^{2} and its volume is 411 km^{3}. The Archipelago Sea and the Åland Sea regulate water exchange between Gulf of Bothnia and Baltic Proper.

Many ferries moving between Finland and Sweden cross the Sea of Åland.

The official English Language name of the sea area as defined by the Baltic Marine Environment Commission HELCOM, is "Åland Sea". The HELCOM nomenclature is also referenced by the International Council for the Exploration of the Sea (ICES). The same name is also used in scientific literature. Some other sources also use the name "Sea of Åland" in English.
