= Lönkytin =

Island in Oulu, Finland

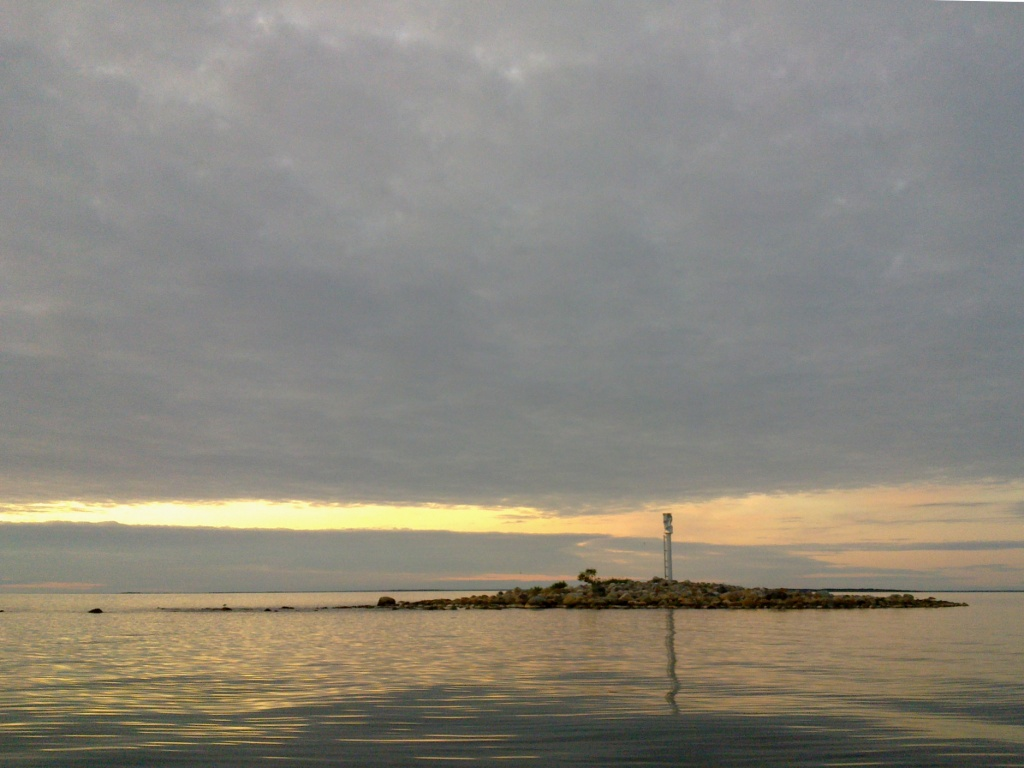

- Location within Finland

Geography
- Coordinates: 65°14.35′N 25°04.05′E
- Adjacent to: Bay of Bothnia

Administration
- Finland
- Region: Northern Ostrobothnia
- Subregion: Oulu
- Municipality: Oulu

Demographics
- Population: Uninhabited

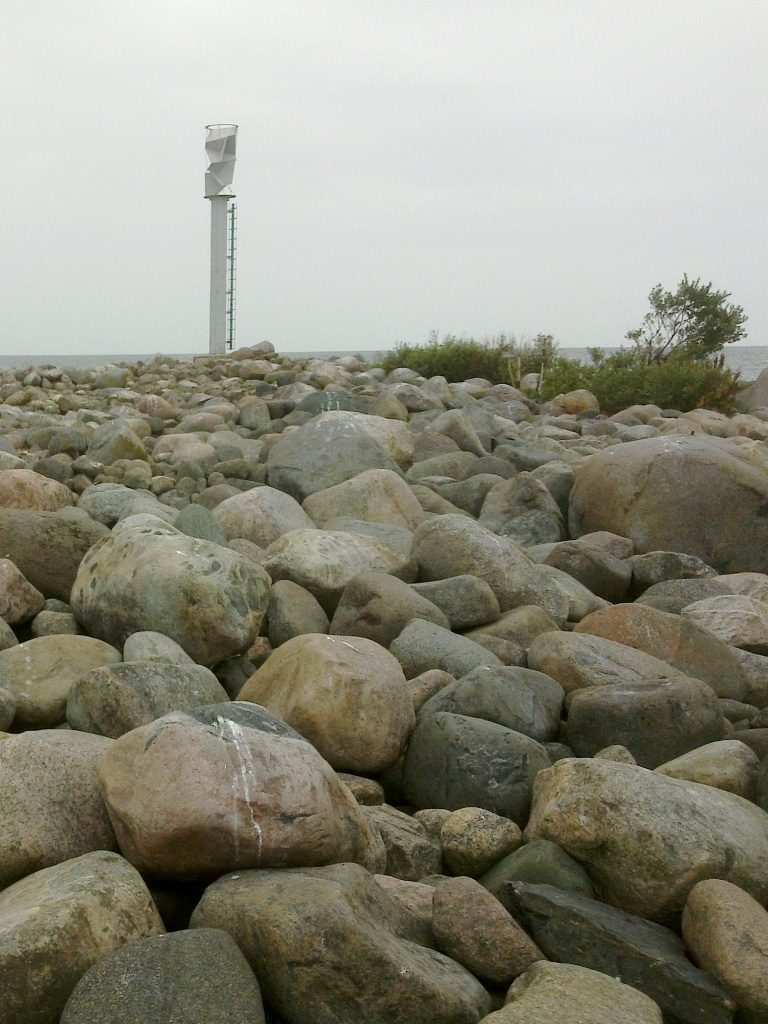
Lönkytin radar reflector

Lönkytin is an island in the Finnish sector of the Bay of Bothnia, off shore from the town of Haukipudas.

== Description ==
Lönkytin is a high, rocky islet. It is located about 10 kilometres (6.2 mi) west-northwest of the mouth of the Kiiminkijoki river, to the east of the Oulu and Kemi deep-water route. The island has a radar reflector. It is near one of the deepest parts of the Finnish sector of the Gulf of Bothnia, at some places reaching a depth of 50 metres (160 ft).

The second-closest island to the east is Satakarinletto.
