= Kellon Kraaseli =

Island in Oulu, Finland

- Location within Finland

Geography
- Coordinates: 65.091224°N 25.323089°E
- Adjacent to: Bay of Bothnia
- Area: 5 km^{2} (1.9 sq mi)

Administration
- Finland
- Region: Northern Ostrobothnia
- Municipality: Oulu
- District: Kello

Demographics
- Population: Uninhabited

Kellon Kraaseli (officially Kraaseli) is an island in the Finnish sector of the Bay of Bothnia.

== Description ==
Kellon Kraaseli is located off shore from the village of the Kello district in Oulu. The name is derived from the Swedish word gråsäl, meaning "gray seals".

Kellon Kraaseli is a low island, with its highest point only a few meters above sea level. The coastline has a total length of about 10 kilometres (6.2 mi). The island is almost entirely covered by deciduous vegetation. It has extensive riparian areas which are often covered by high sea water. The island is used only for summer cottages and harbor protection.

Kellon Kraaseli was used for common pasturage for cows and sheep until the start of the 1980s. Today the island is separated from Rapakari island towards the mainland by an artificial channel built as a recreational waterway with a nominal depth of 1.8 metres (5 ft 11 in). The sea area north of the island is known as Kellonlahti, and the sea area to the east off the coast of Pateniemi is called the Kuivasmeri. This stretch of water is fairly sheltered, and is used as a common anchorage for fishing boats during stormy weather.

== Gallery ==
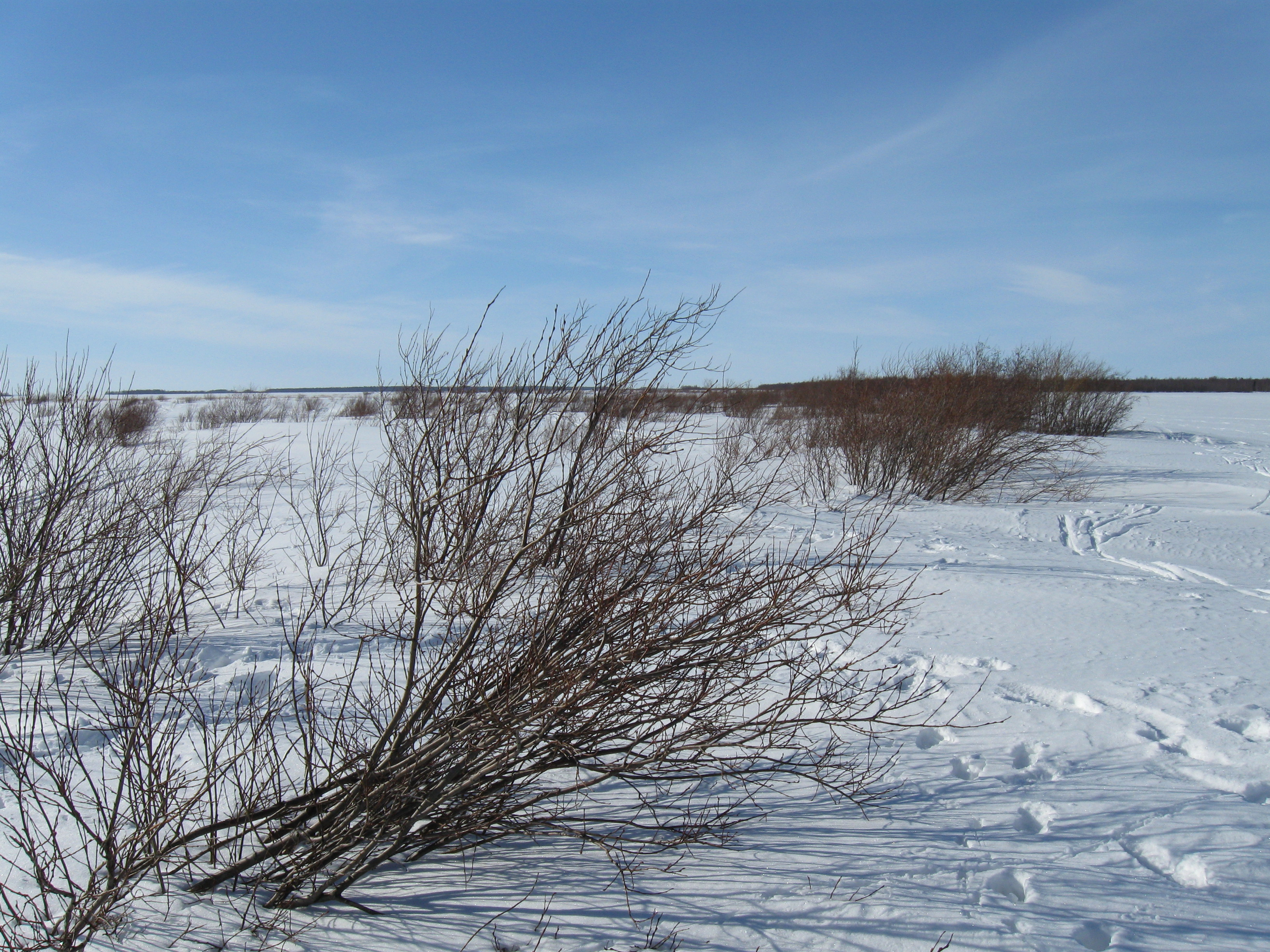
Kraaseli in winter

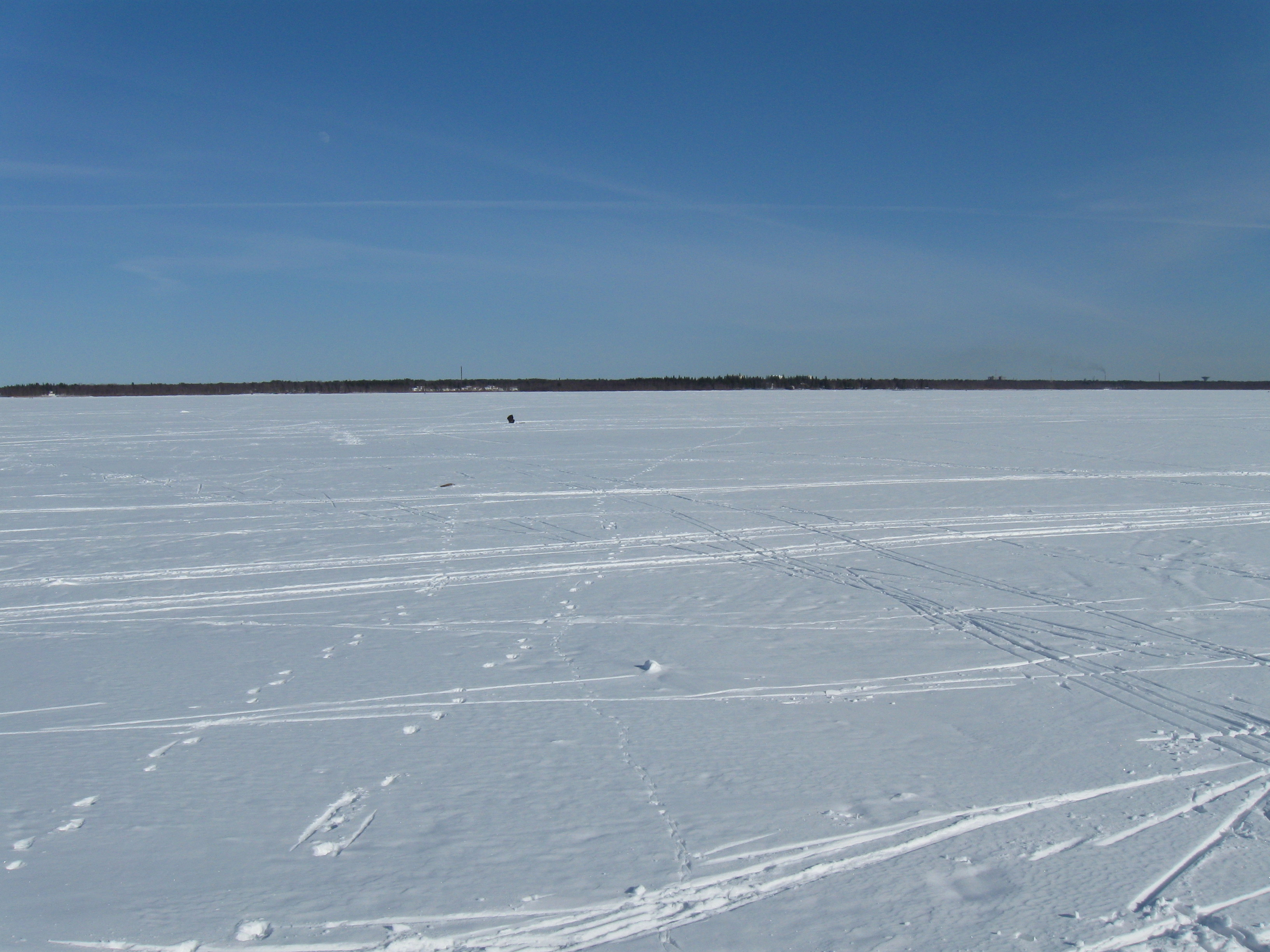
Kuivasmeri from Kraaseli, looking towards the east

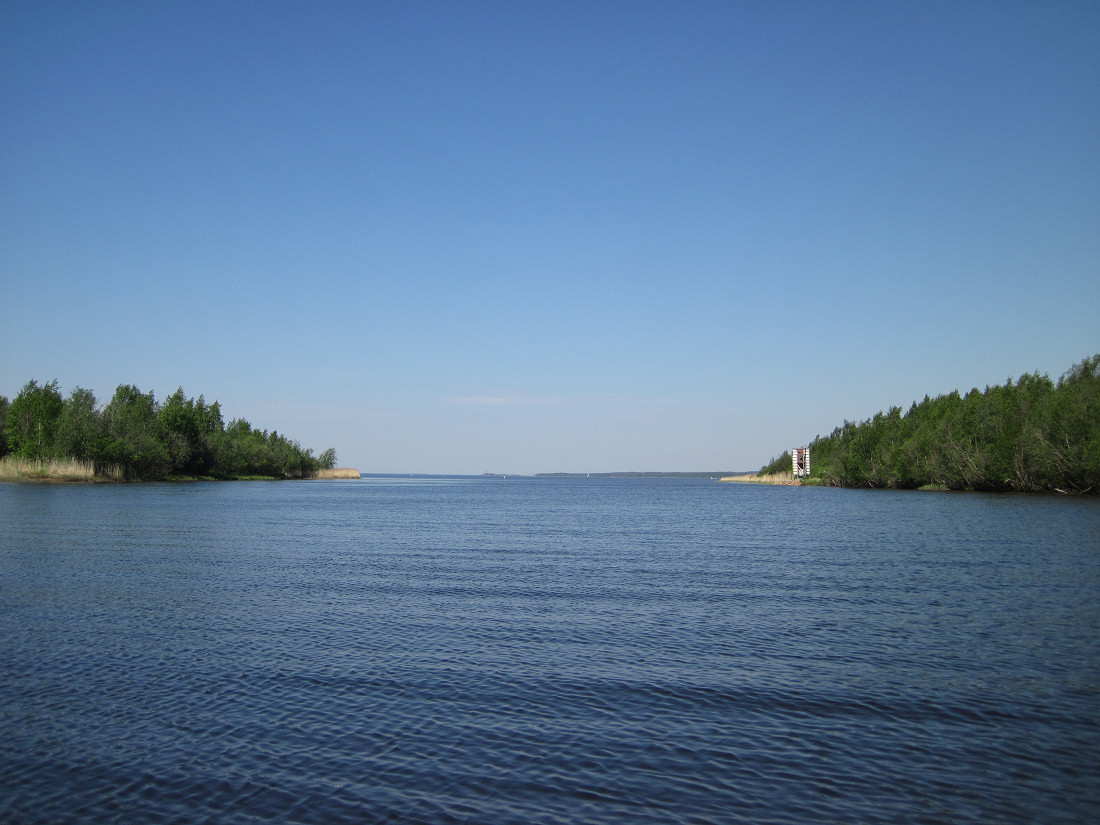
Sudenväylä (also known as Kraaselin kaivanto) boating channel, Haukipudas, Finland. Seen from a vessel approaching from Kuivasmeri bay towards Kellonlahti bay. The island on the left (south) is Kellon Kraaseli, on the island on the right (north) is Rapakari
