= Landsort Deep =

Deepest point in the Baltic sea

Coordinates: 58°36′00″N 18°14′00″E

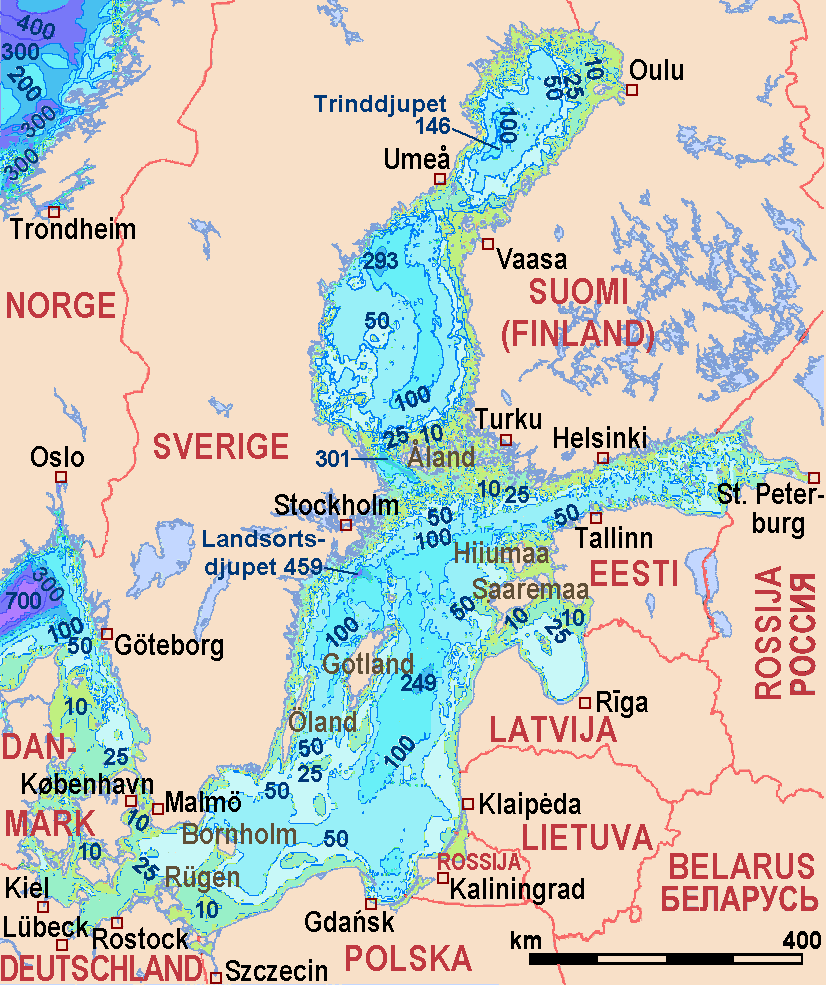
Baltic Sea bathymetry

The Landsort Deep (Swedish: Landsortsdjupet) is a marine abyss located in the Baltic Sea and, at 456.51 m (1,497.7 ft) deep, constitutes its deepest point.

== Geographical location ==
The Landsort Deep is located 24km southeast of the ancient lighthouse Landsorts fyr on the southern tip of the Swedish island of Öja (in front of the Södertörn peninsula), 80km northwest of Cape Harudden on the large Swedish island of Gotland and 62.9km northwest of Cape Bredsandsudden on the small Swedish island of Gotska Sandön where the Gotska Sandön National Park is located.

Until the 1960s, radioactive waste and chemical residues were dumped on the Landsort Deep.

== See also ==
- Depression (geology)
- Gotland Deep
