= Bothnian Sea =

Southern part of the Gulf of Bothnia

Coordinates: 61°30′N 019°30′E

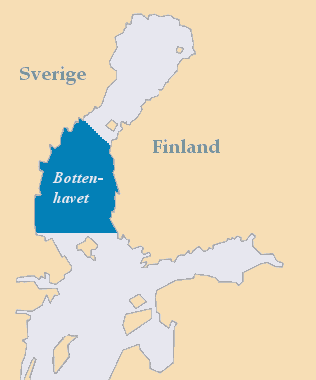
The area of the Bothnian Sea.

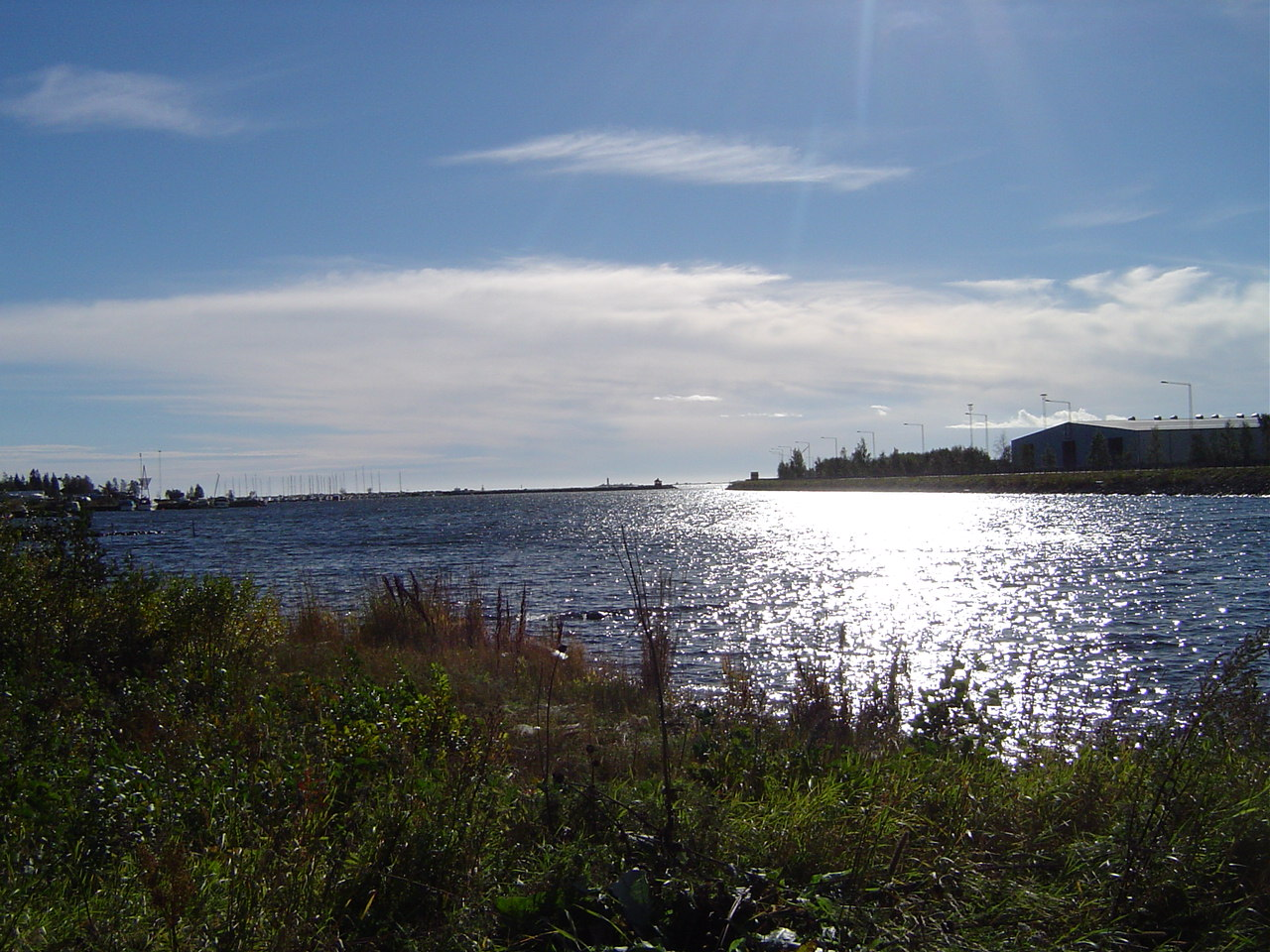
Bothnian Sea at Holmsund in Sweden in September 2004.

The Bothnian Sea (Swedish: Bottenhavet; Finnish: Selkämeri) links the Bothnian Bay (also called the Bay of Bothnia) with the Baltic proper. Kvarken is situated between the two. Together, the Bothnian Sea and Bay make up a larger geographical entity, the Gulf of Bothnia, where the Bothnian Sea is the southern part. The whole Gulf of Bothnia is situated between Sweden, to the west, Finland, to the east, and the Sea of Åland and Archipelago Sea to the south. The surface area of the Bothnian Sea is approximately 79,000 square kilometres (30,500 sq mi). The largest coastal towns, from south to north, are Rauma and Pori in Finland, and Gävle and Sundsvall in Sweden. Umeå (Sweden) and Vaasa (Finland) lie in the extreme north, near Bothnian Bay.

== See also ==
- Bothnian Sea National Park
