= List of islands of the Kalix archipelago =

This list of islands of the Kalix archipelago includes the many islands, large and small, in the Swedish Kalix archipelago in the north of the Bothnian Bay. They are part of the larger archipelago that encompasses islands around the northern end of the bay. Islands in Kalix archipelago include:

- Ajaxarna
- Algrundet
- Alholmarna
- Alholmen
- Almansgrundet
- Ankargrynnan
- Bastagrundet
- Berghamn
- Berghamnklippan
- Bergnäsgrunden
- Bergön
- Bettnäsgrundet
- Binnören
- Binnörgrynnan
- Björkgrundet
- Björkholmen
- Björn
- Björnholmsgrynnan
- Björngrundet
- Björnrevet
- Blackgrundet
- Blåhällan
- Bockön
- Bodskatagrynnan
- Bodögrönnan
- Bodörsreven
- Bodöskären
- Bredskäret
- Börstholmsgrunden
- Börstskärsbådan
- Börstskärsgrundet
- Dagbrotten
- Djupbäcksholmen
- Djupvarpsgrynnan
- Dockholmen
- Enagrundet
- Enholmen
- Enrisgrundet
- Eriksören
- Erikören
- Finskören
- Fjuksholmen
- Fjuksholmsgrundet
- Fjärdsgrundet, east
- Fjärdsgrundet, west
- Flaragrynnorna
- Flockgrundet
- Flottgrundet
- Frevisören
- Furuholmen
- Furuholmen, Sangis
- Furuholmsgrunden
- Fälesön-Lägenön
- Fårögrundet
- Följet
- Gammalhusgrundet
- Gammalhusgrynnorna
- Getholmen
- Getskär
- Granholmen
- Granön-Börstskäret
- Granskatagrunden
- Granskäret
- Grisselholmen
- Grundet
- Gräddmanshällorna
- Gräddören
- Gräsgrynnan
- Gräsören
- Gårdgrönnan
- Gåsören
- Halsögrundet
- Halsön
- Hamnholmen
- Haragrunden
- Hastaskäret
- Hastaskärsgrundet
- Humlan
- Huvögrunden
- Häggholmen
- Hällgrundet
- Hällhamskatagrynnorna
- Hällholmen, Kalix east
- Hällholmen, Kalix west
- Hällskäret
- Hönsungen
- Hönsunggrundet
- Innerstgrundet
- Inre Grönnan
- Kallskär
- Kallvikskäret
- Kalvgrunden
- Kastören
- Kattholmen
- Kattholmsgrynnorna
- Kaxen
- Klingergundet
- Korpholmen
- Korpholmgrynnan
- Korsgrundet-Vattungen
- Kringelön
- Kuggen
- Kuggrynnan
- Kullmössan
- Kungsörarna
- Kusen
- Kvarnörbådan
- Kvarnören
- Kyrkgrundet
- Lappören
- Ligogrunnan
- Likskär
- Likskärsgrynnan
- Likskärshällan
- Likskärsrevet
- Lillbådan
- Lillfårögrynnan
- Lillfåröholmen
- Lillvarpgrundet
- Lillögrundet
- Lill-Fårön
- Lill Bergholmen
- Lill-Jakobgrund
- Lill Skabben
- Lilla Gubben
- Lilla Gumman
- Lilla Huvön
- Lilla Sonaholmen
- Lilla Trutskär
- Lillholmen
- Lutskärsgrynnan
- Lägenö-Furuholmen
- Lägenön, west
- Lång-Lövgrundet
- Långgrundet, east
- Långgrundet, west
- Långgrynnan
- Långören-Rossören
- Långskärsgrunden
- Lövgrundet
- Malgrundet
- Malungsgrundet
- Malungsgrynnan
- Malören
- Massan
- Matsgrundet
- Mellanbrottet
- Mellangubben
- Mellangrundsbotten
- Mellerstskäret
- Mittigrundet, east
- Mittigrundet, west
- Mitti Holsterören
- Nordanskär
- Norra Gammelgrundet
- Notörsgrundet
- Nygrundet
- Nygrynnan
- Nässkatagrundet
- Nätigrundet
- Näverön
- Ollgrundet
- Olnilsbrottet
- Ol-Knuts
- Ornskäret
- Orrskärsgrundet
- Orrskärsrevet
- Oxören
- Per-Jönsagrynnan
- Portstenen
- Pölgrynnan
- Renen
- Repskäret
- Repskärsbådan
- Repskärsgrundet
- Repskärssten
- Revelholmen
- Risholmen
- Risön-Ångören
- Rågholmen
- Rånön
- Rödhällgrundet
- Rönnören
- Sissan
- Sjugranagrynnan
- Skabbgrunden
- Skagsgrunden
- Skags-Furuholmen
- Skarven
- Skirgrundet
- Skogören
- Skränmåsören
- Skötholmen-Lövholmen
- Slätbådan
- Sonaholmsgrundet
- Splitterören
- Stabbsandsgrundet
- Starrgrynnan
- Stenen
- Stengrund
- Stor Bergholmen
- Stor-Fårön
- Stor-Granholmen
- Stora Huvön
- Stor-Jakobgrund
- Stora Gubben
- Stora Gumman
- Stora-Rågholmgrundet
- Stora Sonaholmen
- Stora Trutskär
- Storbrottet
- Storbådan
- Storfårögrynnan
- Storören
- Stridsgrynnan
- Strömsgrundet
- Ströstenarna
- Svallgrundet
- Svartgrundet
- Svarten
- Svartholmen, east
- Svartholmen, west
- Svartholmsgrynnan
- Svarthällan
- Svartskatahällan
- Svartskäret
- Sydhällsgrynnan
- Sälgrönnan
- Södra Gammelgrundet
- Sören-Långören
- Tallholmen
- Tappermann
- Tjärugrundet
- Tjäruskäret
- Tomten
- Tregränagrundet
- Trollen
- Troppören
- Trutbådan
- Truten
- Trutgrynnan
- Trutskär
- Trutskärsgrynnan
- Träffen
- Tunnskär
- Tunnskärshällorna
- Tärnören
- Vaktgrynnan
- Vattengrynnan
- Vattungen
- Vibbgrundet
- Vitgrundet
- Vitgrundet, Lägenön
- Västerst Holsterören
- Vånafjärdsgrynnan
- Yrstenen
- Ytterstlandet
- Yttregrundet
- Yttre Sandgrundet
- Yttre Västantillgrundet
- Åsenholmen
- Örarna

== See also ==
- List of islands of Bothnian Bay
