= Kalix =

Municipality in Norrbotten County, Sweden

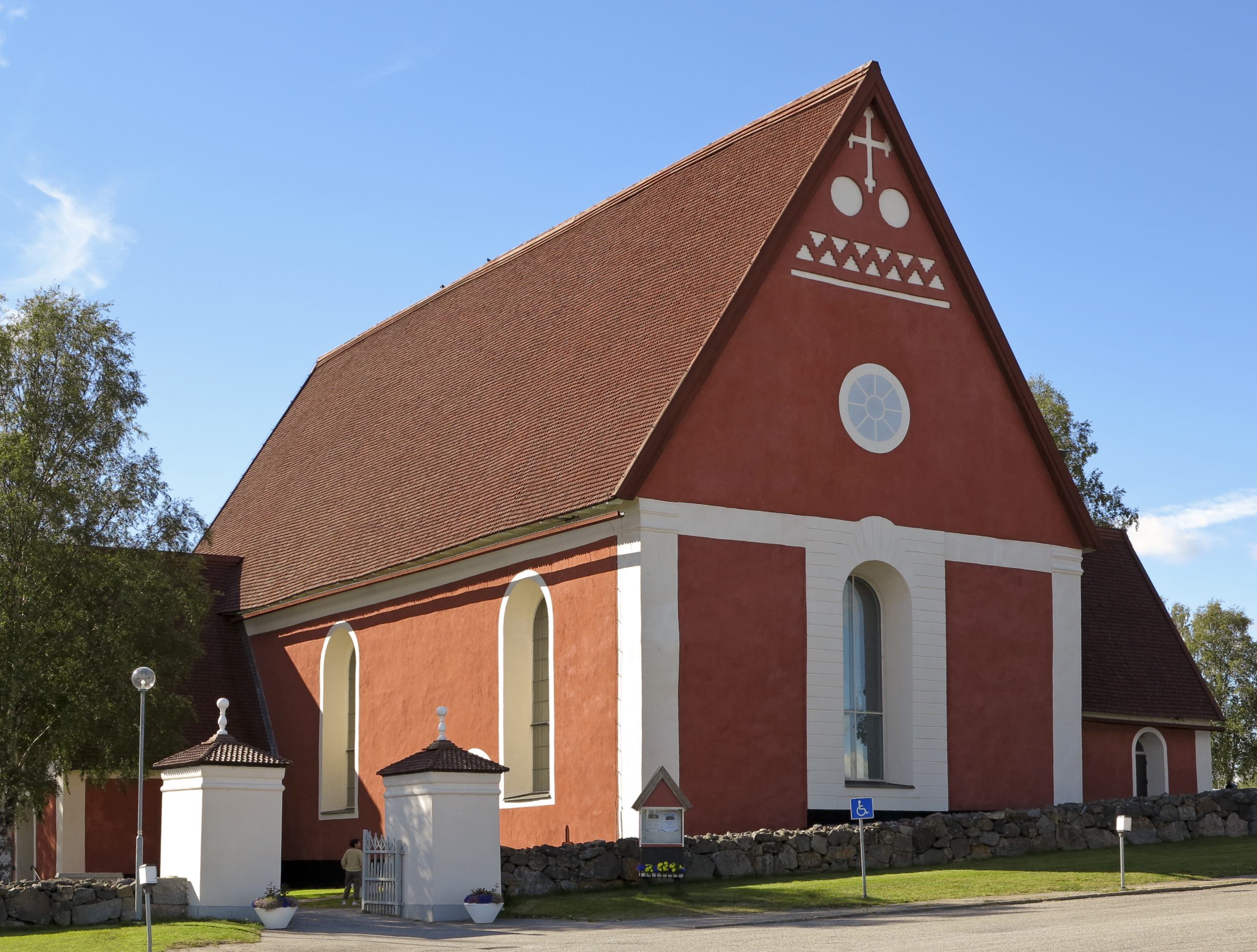
- Kalix Church

- Location within Norrbotten Location within Sweden
- Coordinates: 65°51′N 23°10′E
- Country: Sweden
- Province: Norrbotten
- County: Norrbotten County
- Municipality: Kalix Municipality

Area
  - Total: 7.57 km^{2} (2.92 sq mi)

Population (31 December 2010)
  - Total: 7,299
  - Density: 964/km^{2} (2,500/sq mi)
- Time zone: UTC+1 (CET)
  - Summer (DST): UTC+2 (CEST)
- Website: www.kalix.se

Kalix (Swedish: Kalix; Kalix dialect: Kôlis [ˈcʰ(j)ɞɽɪs], phonemically /kɞɽis/; Finnish: Kainuu; Meänkieli: Kainus) is a locality and the seat of the Kalix Municipality in Norrbotten County, Sweden. The name Kalix is believed to originate from the Sami word Gáláseatnu, or "Kalasätno", meaning "The cold river" the ancient name of the Kalix River. It had 7,299 inhabitants in 2005, out of 17,300 inhabitants in the municipality of Kalix.

== Kalix Löjrom ==
There is a culinary speciality specific to Kalix, called Kalix Löjrom, also referred to as caviar of Kalix. It is basically fish eggs (caviar) of the vendace, but because of the large influx of fresh water from the huge rivers around and in Kalix, this has transformed the taste of the fish eggs, rendering them unique in flavour to this area alone. It is the special mix of the elements bromine, strontium, iodine, selenium, molybdenum, barium and lithium, along with a unique ratio between strontium and barium, that makes the Kalixlöjrom unique, which is why the EU has granted the Protected Geographical Status for the Kalixlöjrom. The Kalix Löjrom has been present at many Nobel dinners through the years, and among others, the 1990 Gastronomy Academy gold medal winner Norbert Lang of Paul & Norbert in Stockholm likes his Kalixlöjrom.

== Sites of interest ==
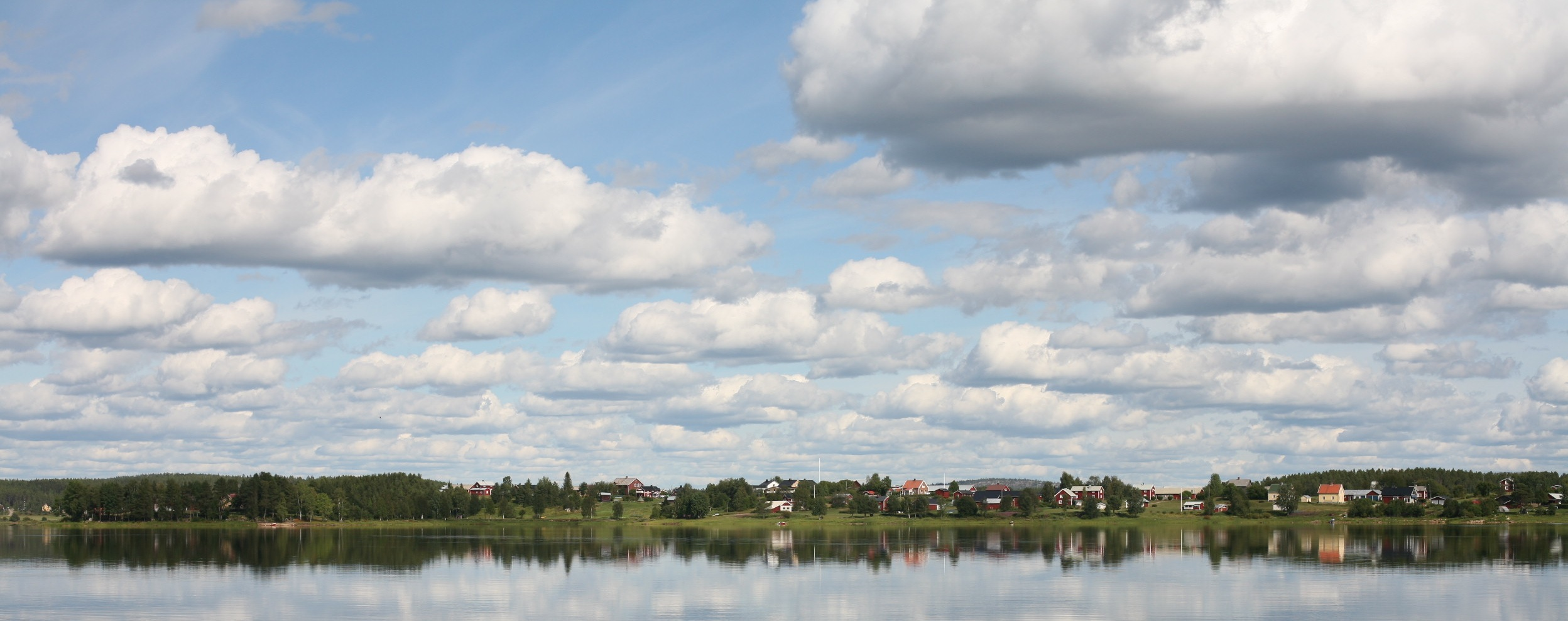
Kalix River in Övermorjärv, Kalix

The archipelago outside the Kalix coast line has 792 islands. Some of the larger islands in the Kalix archipelago include:

Name	Latitude	Longitude
Bergön	65°45'85"N	22°45'60"E
Berghamn	65°40'55"N	23°00'00"E
Getskär-Renskär	65°39'05"N	22°58'70"E
Halsön	65°43'10"N	23°31'00"E
Likskär	65°38'30"N	23°02'19"E
Malören	65°31'60"N	23°33'50"E
Rånön	65°44'06"N	22°55'01"E
Stora Huvön	65°40'75"N	22°54'00"E
Stora Trutskär	65°45'60"N	23°22'90"E

Bergön is known as having the highest-regarded sauna in the Kalix archipelago. Halsön has a large white sand beach with barbecue camps. The most popular island, however, is Malören. Malören is the final outpost of the archipelago and has as such had maritime pilots placed there from the 1830s all the way up to 1967. The island has a church, a small village with houses mostly used as summer cabins today, but also interesting remains of previous ages, like a small graveyard, a labyrinth and a shipwreck. The archipelago is significant to the people of Kalix - if one does not have a cabin there then at least a good boat to get from island to island in. Also, one of the most popular summer occurrences for the local population is the sailing races organized by the Kalix sail- and race boat society (Kalix Segel och Motorbåtssällskap, KSMS).

The perhaps most interesting building in Kalix is Kalix Church. The building of the church started in the first half of the 15th century. The first time it is mentioned in writing is in an indulgence letter written on June 29, 1472 by archbishop Jakob Ulfsson Örnfot of Uppsala. The letter of indulgence was written on the same day that the archbishop inaugurated the polyptych. The church also has a very interesting history, with a remarkably well preserved girl buried under the entrance dressed like a bride, and the fact that the church was used as a stable for the horses of the Russian army in 1808.

The town has a military museum called Kalix Line museum, dedicated to the region's line of fortification known as the Kalix Line (Kalixlinjens). It has over 60 vehicles, including a Saab 35 Draken and four Bandvagn 202 variants.

== History ==
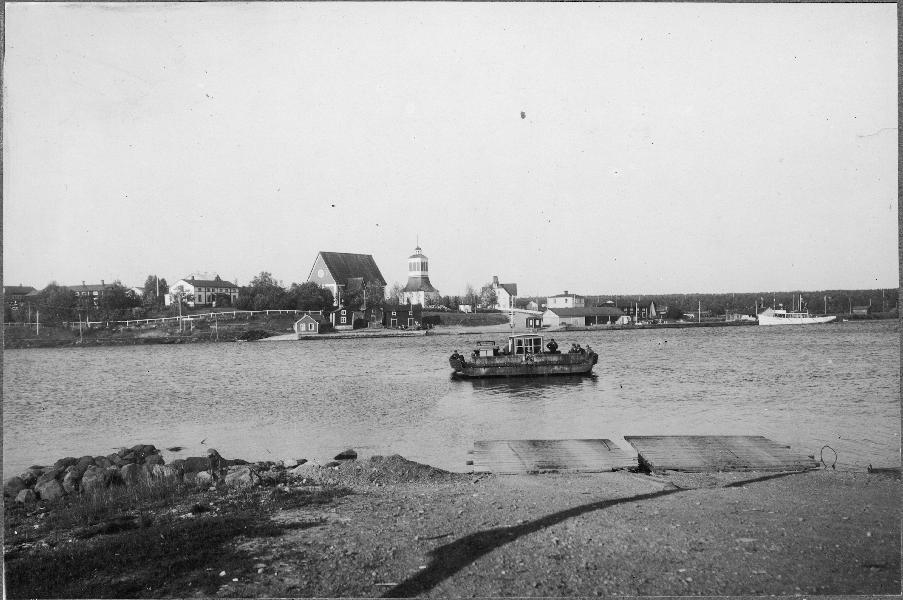
Kalix ferryplace in year 1926 before the first bridge has been built, which happened 1930. In the background you can see the church and a few houses and a store that was located next to the harbour.

About 4500 years ago the climate in the north of the Nordic countries started to warm up after the last ice age. The warmth together with isostasy made it possible to inhabit the area around Kalix.

Already around year 1000 Kalix had goods from the forest and river which would cause people from the south to sail all the way up to Kalix. The tradition of trading seems to have continued across the centuries, as Carl von Linné and his apprentice Lars Montin visited the Kalix marketplace in 1732 and 1749 and complained about the haggling with the Kalix' traders, which allowed the people of Kalix a good price on butter and tar but drove up the inflation in Stockholm.

Kalix as a socken (Nordic name for Local geographic area with its own administration) was First mentioned in 1482. Before this point the area had been referred to with many different names: Caliss, Kaliss, Calixe, Calix and Neder Kalix. To confuse things further, a current municipality called Överkalix (Upper Kalix) was a part of the Kalix municipality until 1644, when it became its own municipality, with the result that people started referring to Kalix as "Nederkalix (Lower Kalix).

During the 18th century each village in the Kalix area had its own part of the river to fish Salmon and Common whitefish. The villages along the coast line caught Common bleak and Herring. Part of the catch was transported down south, along with Seal blubber and tar. Around 1660 a copper mine was opened south of Bodträsk by Moån village. At the end of the 18th century Björkfors village also opened a mine, and in Törefors village an iron mine opened in 1801.

On March 25, 1809, Kalix was the location of the capitulation of the Swedish Army in the Finnish War. In effect it surrendered Finland to Russia. Peace talks were initiated in the Finnish town Fredrikshamn (or Hamina in Finnish), and a peace treaty was signed on August 30.

During World War II and the Cold War, the region was the center of the Kalix Line, a defensive position made to defend against an eventual invasion by the Soviet Union. The positions would be demilitarized in the 1990s and some parts of it open to the public.

== Economy ==
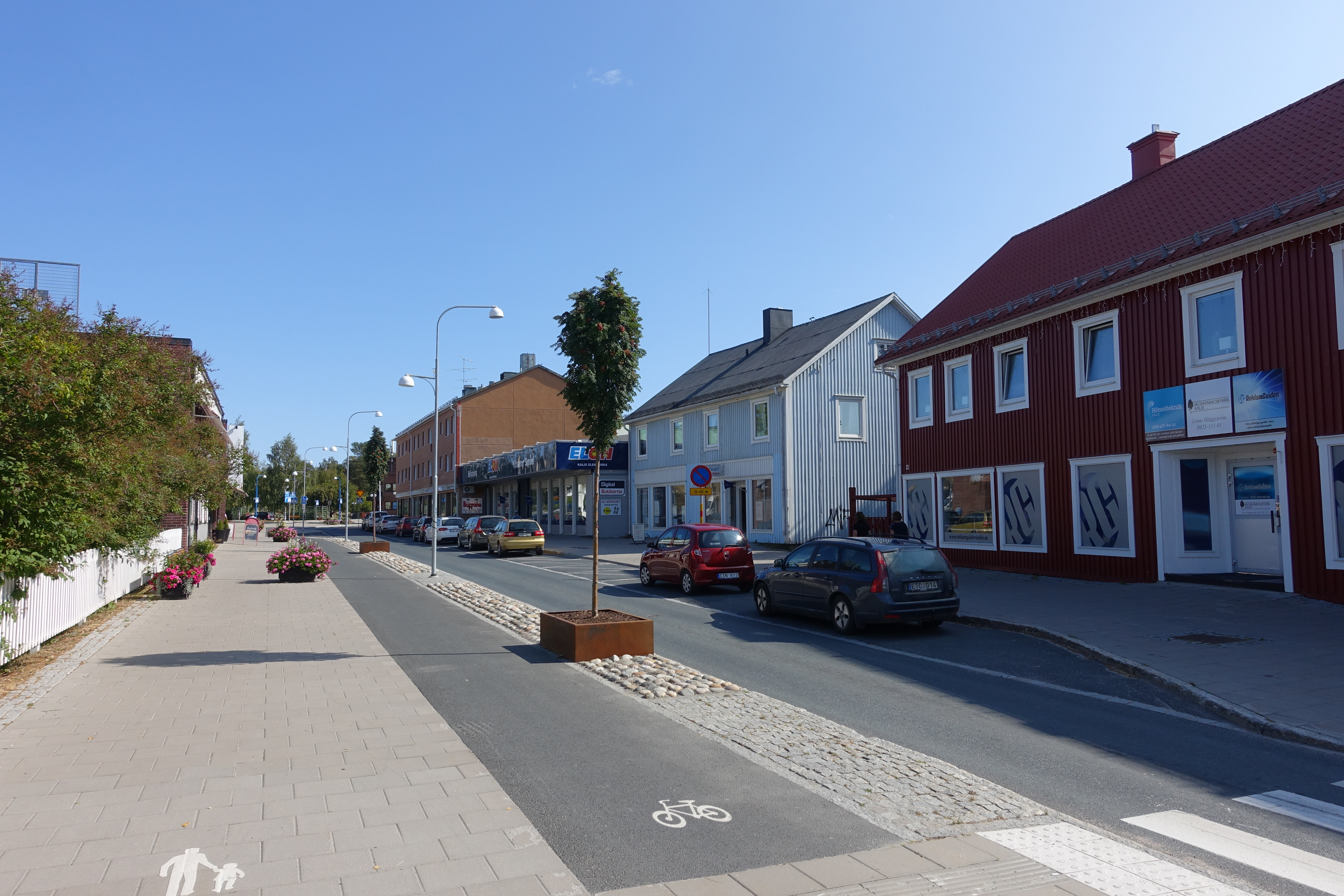
The main street in Kalix, Köpmannagatan.

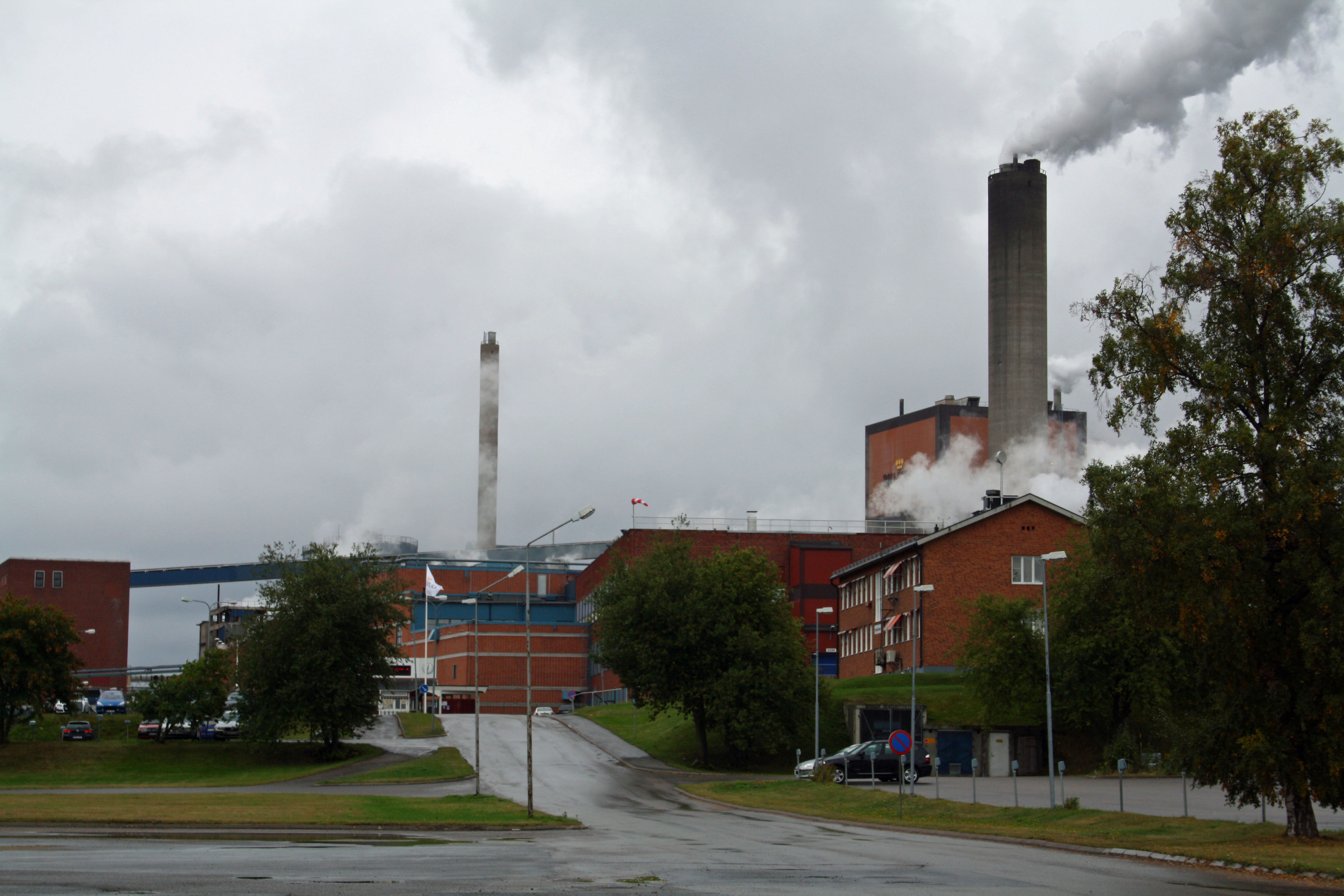
BillerudKorsnäs pulp mill and paper mill in Karlsborg, 2012.

The biggest employer in Kalix is the municipality, with 1600 employees. The hospital in Kalix comes second with 503 employees.

In the private sector the biggest employers are:

- Billerud Karlsborg AB 420 employees
- Part AB 164 employees
- Borö pannan AB 110 employees
- Samhall AB 110 employees
- Silja Line/Tallink AB 83 employees

The income and employment for many people in Kalix still revolves around the forest industry (Billerud Karlsborg AB and partially Part AB). Billerud is a paper packaging industry. Karlsborg is today one of Europe's biggest makers of white, porous paper for packaging of building materials, but they also have production of other strong packaging paper, and some white, long fiber sulphate mass. Part AB makes prefabricated bathrooms that they sell all over Europe. Borö Pannan AB makes accumulator tanks for water heating. Silja Line/Tallink AB are a phone service based office, taking advantage of the perception that the northern accent is pleasant to listen to over the phone, not to mention that the salaries up north are lower than in the south of Sweden.

The economy of the municipality has deteriorated over the past few years. In 2005 the tax incomes from local inhabitants was 562.5 million SEK in 2005 compared to 616.2 million SEK in 2008, but even so, the debt has increased by 8,8% (from 459,278,410 SEK to 499,997,708 SEK). During the same time period, meaning 2005 to 2008, the tax subsidies from the state taxes has increased from 197.1 million SEK to 210.1 million SEK. The municipality population has been steadily decreasing since 1955, and 321 people left the municipality between 2005 and 2008. Kalix has, in other words, a small population with a high tax pressure, and a much bigger debt than ever before.

== Sports ==
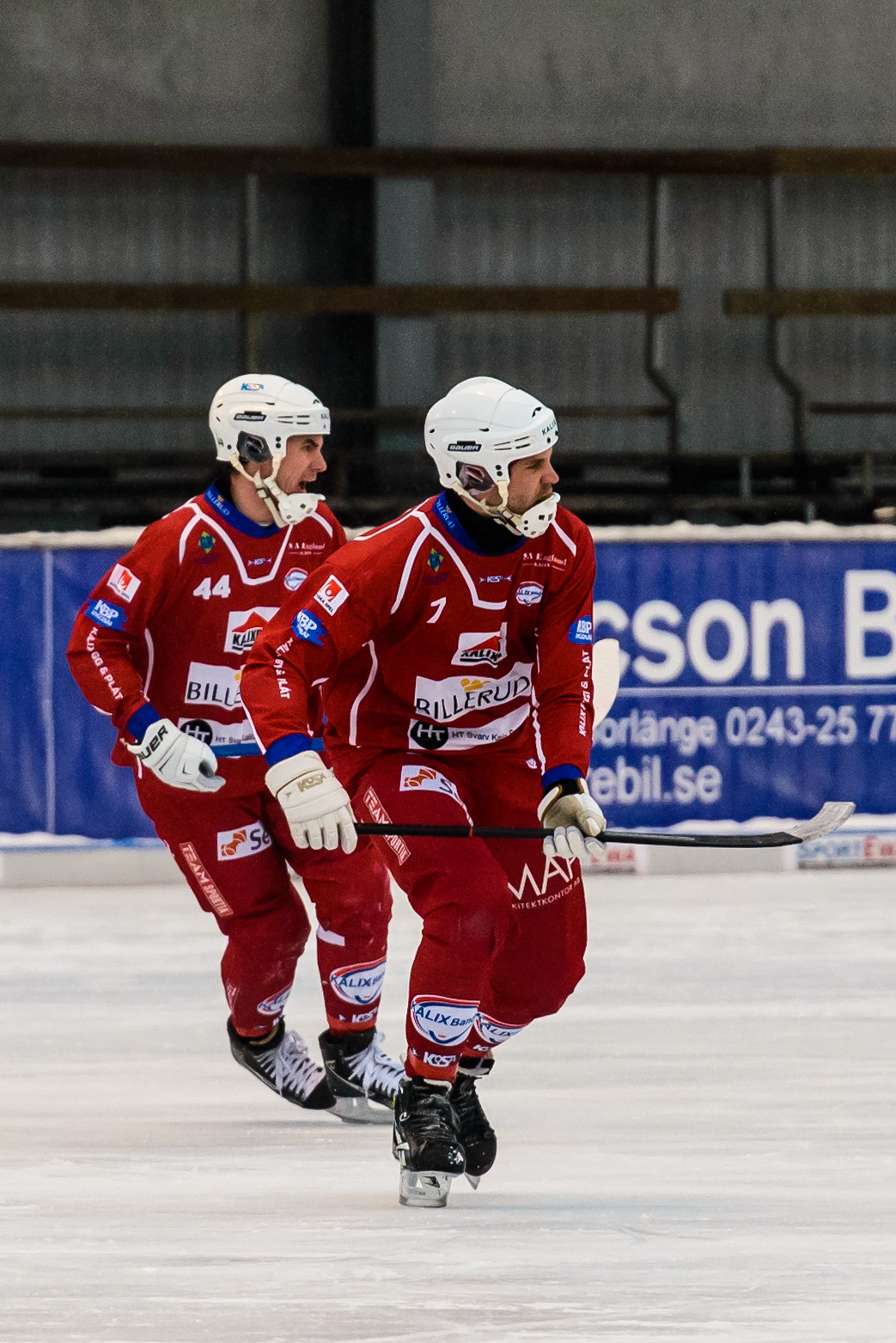
Kalix Bandy

The following sports clubs are located in Kalix:

- IFK Kalix

The town's bandy club, Kalix Bandy, has played in the men's highest division.

== Villages ==
- Långfors
