= Jänkänalusta =

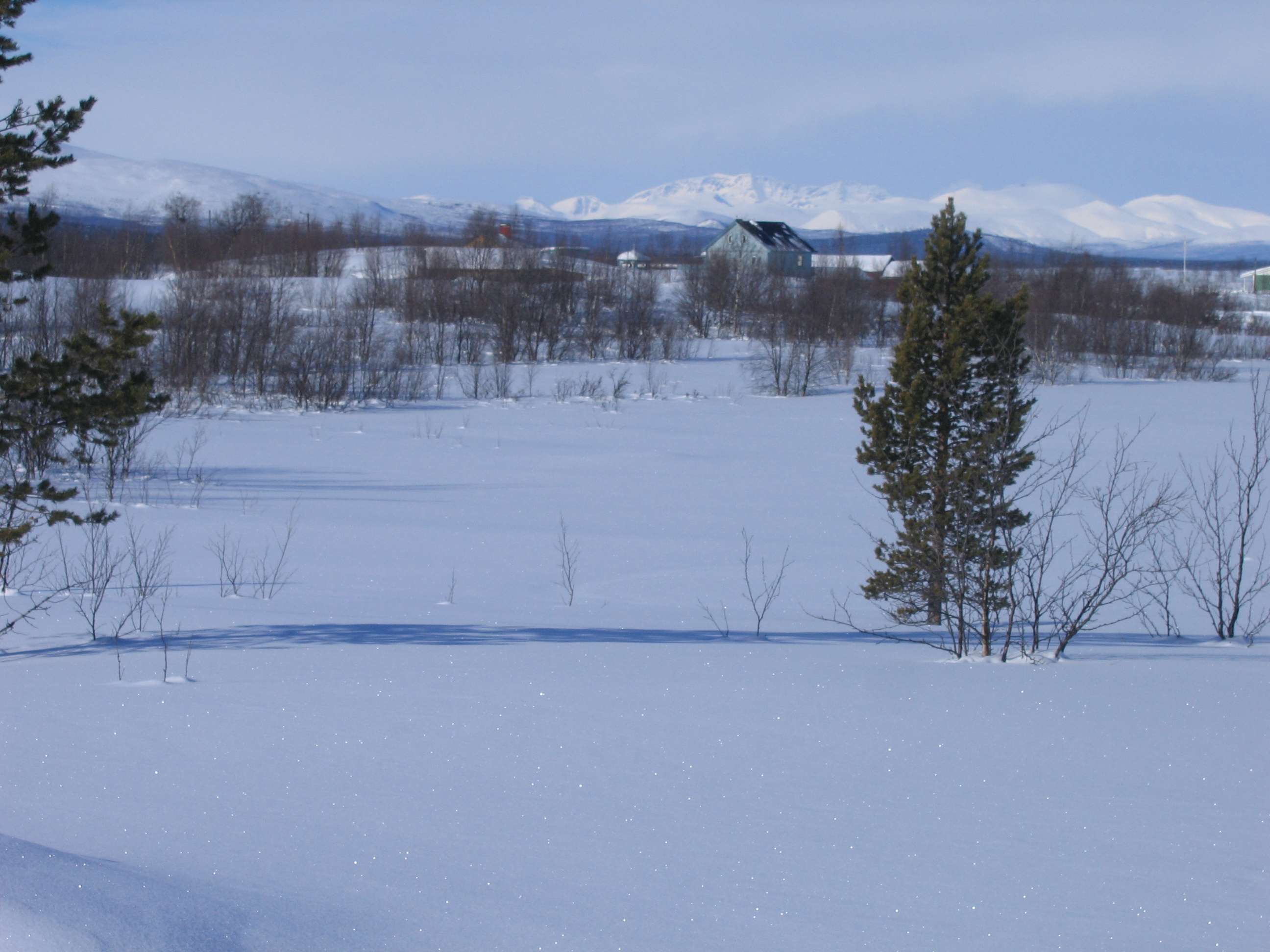
- Jänkänalusta with Kebnekaise

- Location within Norrbotten Location within Sweden
- Coordinates: 67°46′N 19°57′E
- Country: Sweden
- Municipality: Kiruna Municipality
- County: Norrbotten County
- Province: Lapland
- Elevation: 470 m (1,540 ft)
- Time zone: UTC+1 (CET)
  - Summer (DST): UTC+2 (CEST)

Jänkänalusta (Swedish pronunciation: [ˈjɛ̌ŋːkɛnalɵsta]) is a small settlement with roughly 20-30 inhabitants, located at lake Kaalasjärvi at the road from Kiruna to Nikkaluokta. The name of the settlement is Meänkieli and roughly translates as 'the beginning of the mire'.

The village was founded around 1902 when spouses Johan 'Posti-Juntti' Fjällborg (1873-1944) and Maria Erika Olsdotter Stålnacke (1878-1967) moved there from the nearby village Kaalasjärvi. Some time after moving there their house was demolished by the local merchant 'Monkka' Stålnacke due to their debts, despite this they still stayed and the settlement eventually grew.
