= Likskärshällan =

Island in the country of Sweden

Coordinates: 65°38′32″N 23°01′33″E

Likskärhällan is a Swedish island belonging to the Kalix archipelago. The island is part of the Likskär Nature Reserve. It lies to the west of the main island and is named after Likskär. The island has no shore connection and is unbuilt.
