= Tunnskär =

Island in the Kalix archipelago, Sweden

Coordinates: 65°45′55″N 23°28′29″E

Tunnskär is a Swedish Island belonging to the Kalix archipelago. It lies east of Båtskärsnäs. The island has no connection to the main land and has some houses along the north coast as only buildings.
