= Vettasjärvi =

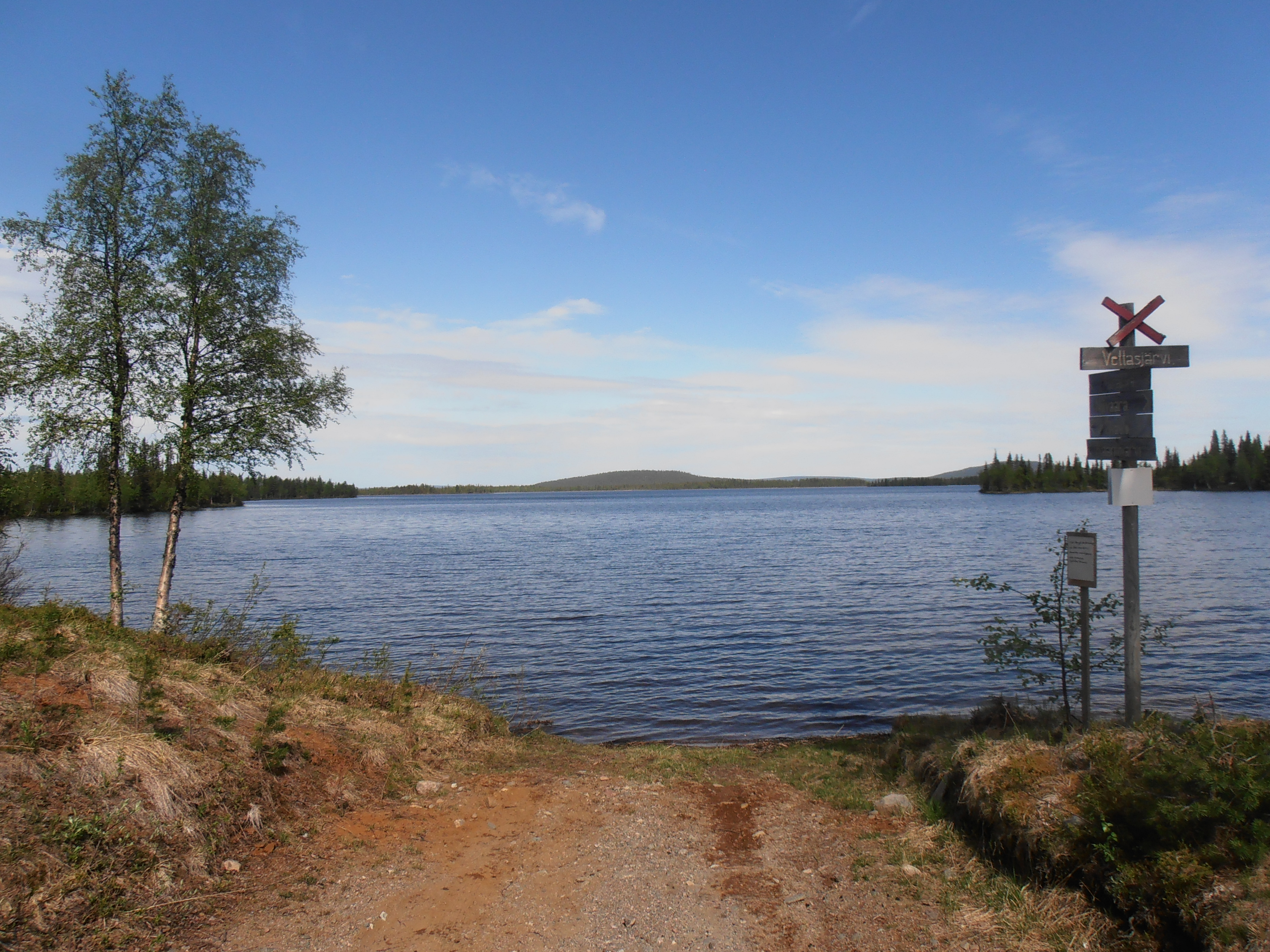
- Vettasjärvi in June 2020
- Location: Sweden, Norrbotten County, Gällivare Municipality, Lapland
- Coordinates: 67.41232°N 21.66504°E
- Type: Lake
- Surface area: 8.99 square kilometres (3.47 sq mi)
- Surface elevation: 349 metres (1,145 ft) above sea level

Location
- Interactive map of Vettasjärvi

Vettasjärvi is a lake in the municipality of Gällivare in Lapland and is part of the main catchment area of the Kalix River. The lake has an area of 8.99 square kilometres and is 349 metres above sea level. The lake is drained by the river Ängesån. The village of Vettasjärvi is located by the lake.

== Subbasin ==
Vettasjärvi is part of the sub-basin (749133-175063) that SMHI calls the Vettasjärvi outlet. The average altitude is 362 metres above sea level and the area is 33.01 square kilometres. There is a catchment area upstream, and if this is included, the accumulated area is 39.15 square kilometres. The river Ängesån draining the catchment area has tributary order 3, which means that the water flows through a total of 3 watercourses before reaching the sea after 228 kilometres. The catchment area consists mostly of forest (49%) and marshland (15%). The catchment area has 9.84 square kilometres of water surface, giving it a lake percentage of 29.8%. Settlements in the area cover an area of 1.11 square kilometres or 3% of the catchment area.

== History ==
Vettasjärvi is mentioned in old tax lists as Wettas and Nedre Wettas (1568), Öffuer and Nedre Uethes (1576, 1594) or Ofwer and Neder wolters träsk (1595). The lake was used by Sami people in the Lapp village of Siggevara or Lullebyn (Nederbyn), which covered the eastern part of Jukkasjärvi parish.
