= Kalix Church =

Coordinates: 65°51′14″N 23°07′56″E

- Kalix Kyrka
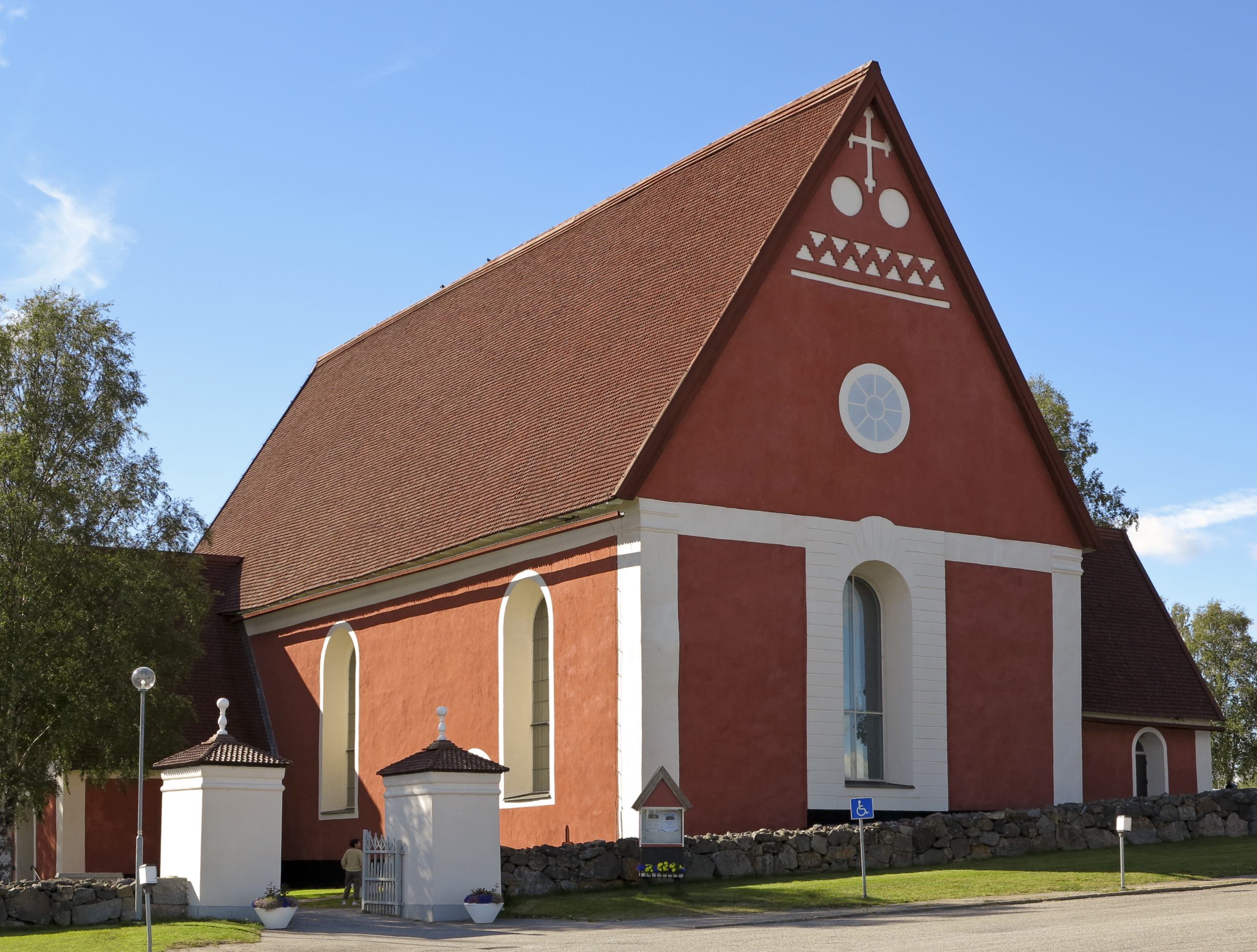
- Kalix Church, external view
- Kalix Church
- Location: Kyrkogatan 1A, Kalix
- Country: Sweden
- Denomination: Church of Sweden
- Previous denomination: Roman Catholic Church
- Website: www.svenskakyrkan.se/kalix/kalix-kyrka

History
- Status: Active
- Founder: Jakob Ulvsson
- Consecrated: 1472

Administration
- Diocese: Diocese of Luleå
- Parish: Kalix Parish

Kalix Church (Swedish: Kalix kyrka, sometimes Nederkalix kyrka) is a medieval Lutheran church in Kalix in Norrbotten County, Sweden. It belongs to the Diocese of Luleå. The church is the northernmost medieval church of Sweden.

== History ==
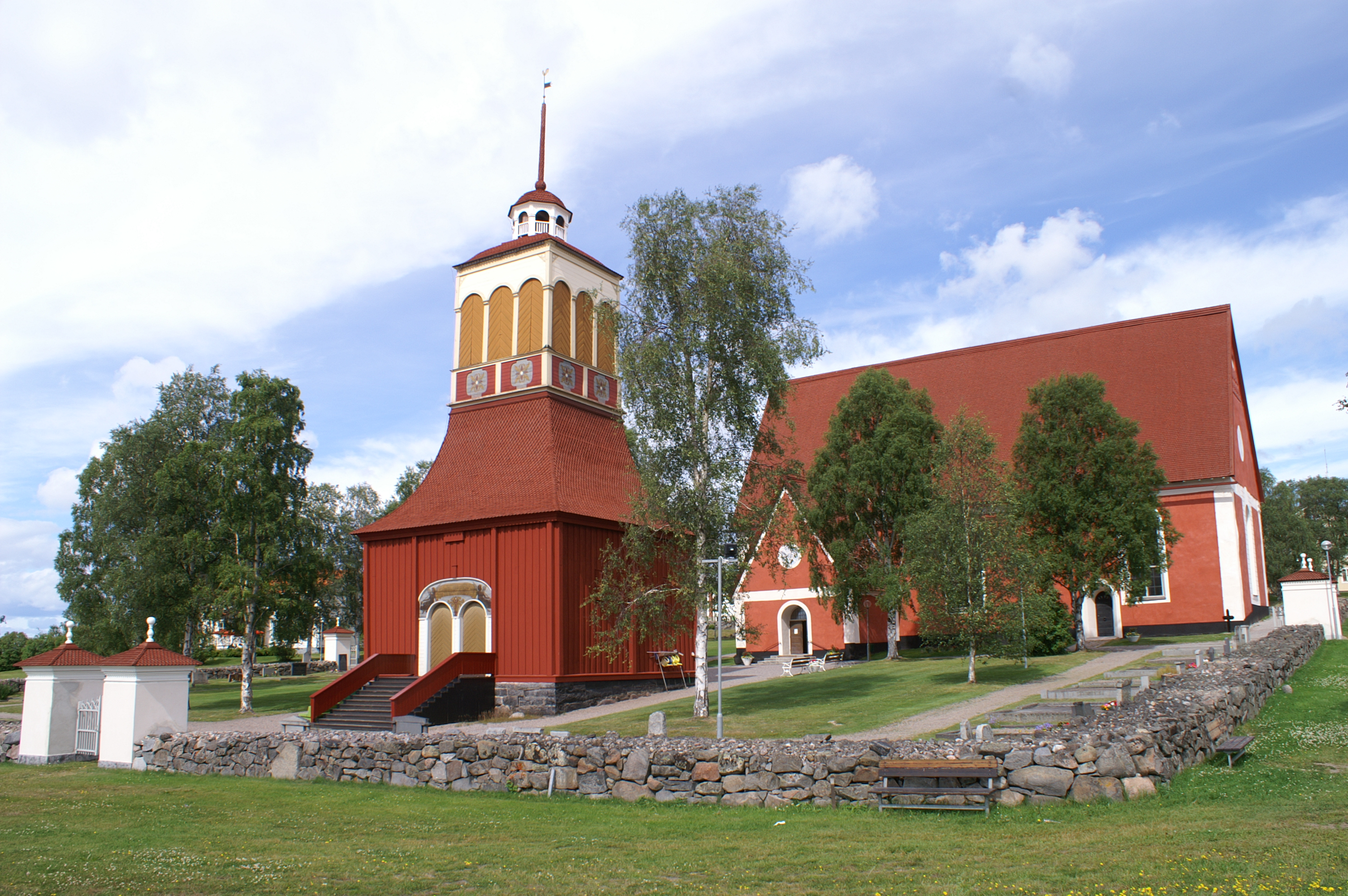
External view with the bell tower

The presently visible church was preceded by a wooden chapel. The exact time of construction of the church is not known, but it was probably constructed during the late 15th century. The church is mentioned for the first time in 1472 when archbishop Jakob Ulvsson from Uppsala visited the church in connection with the inauguration of the altarpiece of the church. The event is mentioned in a letter of indulgence, which is also the oldest written record from Kalix as well as the only letter of indulgence that is known to have been issued from the Diocese of Luleå. The inauguration of the altarpiece may have been done in connection with either the inauguration of the new church or with the start of the construction of it. The church was damaged by fire in 1595, in which a set of medieval frescos were destroyed. A wooden church porch was replaced with one made of stone in the late 17th century. In 1747 the windows were enlarged and in 1753–54 the church was renovated.

The church has been pillaged by Russian troops on two occasions: in 1716, when cash and church vestments were carried off, and again in 1809, when it was used by Russian troops as a stable during the Finnish War.

The church was renovated in 1955 and again in 1972.

== Architecture ==
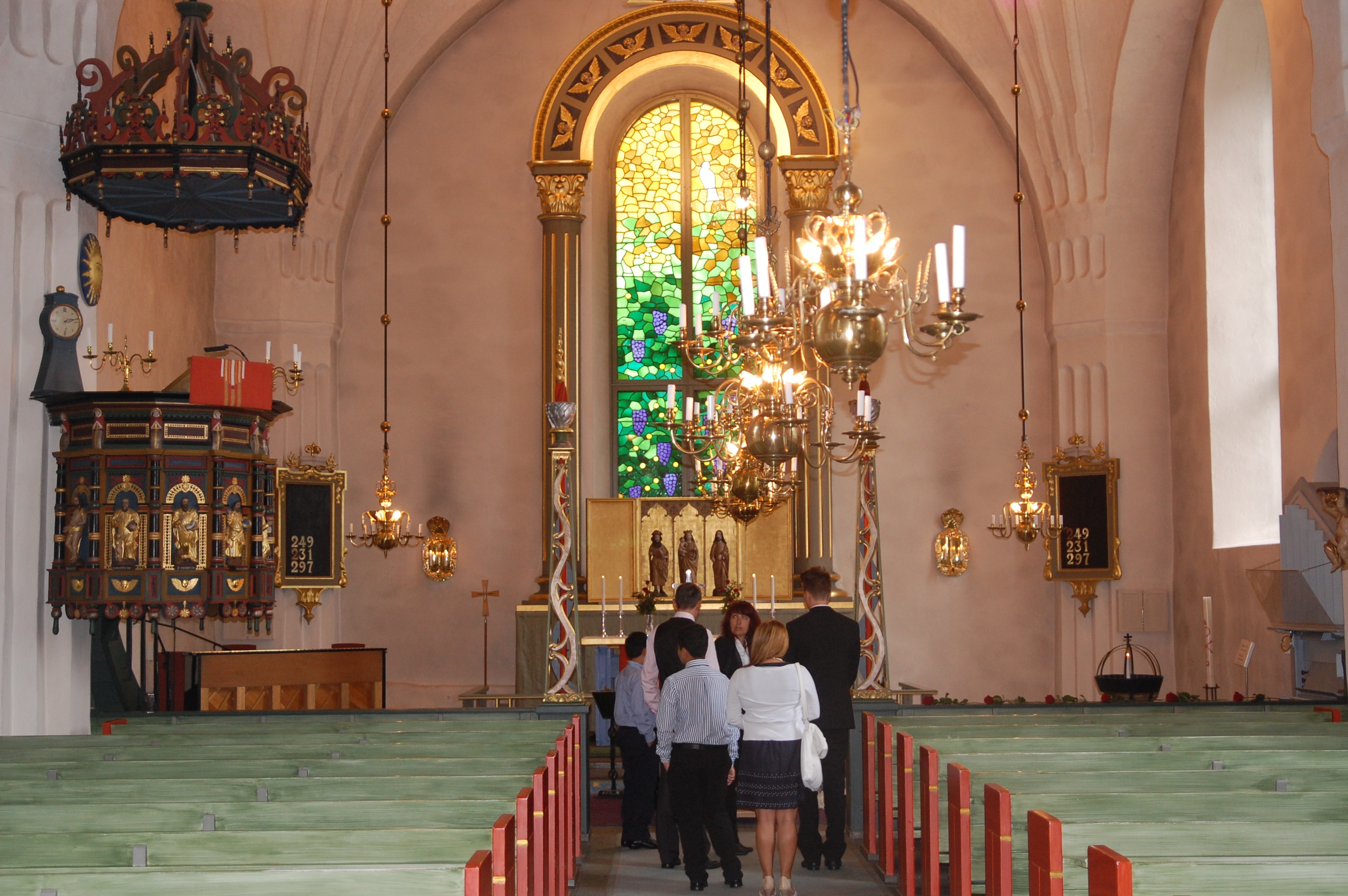
Interior view towards the choir

Kalix Church is a typical representative of a type of late medieval hall churches found in the north of Sweden. The gables of the church display brick ornaments and the building has two medieval portals in its south façade. It lies close to Kalix river in what used to be a so-called church village (Swedish: kyrkby) where congregation members who came from far away would have a small house or cottage in which to stay during church holidays, but of this church village only a single house remains today. Not far from the church lies the old parsonage. An external wooden bell tower, built by carpenters from Ostrobothnia, stands in the cemetery. All in all, the church and its environs constitute a typical representative of a church complex in Norrland.

Inside, the church ceiling rests on three star-shaped vaults. The church contains several medieval items. The aforementioned altarpiece still stands behind the main altar and is adorned with statues depicting, on the central panel, the Holy Virgin with the infant Christ, and on each side of her statues of James the Greater and James the Lesser. The baptismal font is also medieval, as are two separate sculptures of saints. The pulpit is one of the oldest in Norrland, and Baroque in style. The rood screen with its ornamented obelisks dates from the mid-18th century, while two more free-standing sculptures come from an altarpiece made in the 1880s. The choir window dates from 1972 and is made by artist Pär Andersson.

== See also ==
- Trondenes Church, the world's northernmost medieval church
