= Berghamn =

Berghamn may refer to:

- Berghamn, Kalix: Swedish island belonging to the Kalix archipelago in the northern edge of the Gulf of Bothnia
- Berghamn (Swedish peninsula): peninsula at the Swedish east coast, 25 km north of Härnösand.
- Berghamn (Åland): international ferry harbour on Eckerö, Åland islands
- Berghamn (Houtskär): small ferry harbour on the Finnish island Storlandet, belonging to Houtskär archipelago
- Berghamn (Nagu): Finnish island, belonging to Nagu archipelago
