= Långfors =

- Location within Norrbotten Location within Sweden
- Coordinates: 65°59′23″N 22°37′14″E
- Country: Sweden
- Land: Norrland
- County: Norrbotten
- Province: Norrbotten
- Municipality: Kalix

Population (2005)
  - Total: < 50
- Time zone: UTC+1 (CET)
  - Summer (DST): UTC+2 (CEST)

Långfors (long rapids) is a village within the Swedish municipality of Kalix. Långfors is located 10 kilometres north of Töre to the Töre River.
