= Finskören =

Island in the country of Sweden

Coordinates: 65°45′20″N 23°10′05″E

Finskören is a Swedish island belonging to the Kalix archipelago. It is located in the Kalix River. It has no shore connection and has some summer houses.
