= Tunnskärshällorna =

Coordinates: 65.764°N 23.489°E

Tunnskärshällorna is a group of Swedish islands belonging to the Kalix archipelago. It is located to the south-east of the village Båtskärsnäs. The ten smaller islands have no shore connection. On the two larger islands of the group, there are some summer houses.
