= Stengrund =

Island in the country of Sweden

Coordinates: 65°42′20″N 23°16′47″E

Stengrund is a Swedish island belonging to the Kalix archipelago. It is located within the boundary of the Kalix Archipelago Nature Reserve. The island has no shore connection and is unbuilt/uninhabited.
