= Bergön =

Island in the country of Sweden

- Location within Norrbotten Location within Sweden

Geography
- Coordinates: 65°44′17″N 22°45′58″E
- Adjacent to: Bay of Bothnia
- Area: 18.23 km^{2} (7.04 sq mi)

Administration
- Sweden
- Province: Norrbotten
- Municipality: Kalix Municipality

Demographics
- Population: Uninhabited

Bergön is an island in the northwest of the Swedish sector of the Bay of Bothnia, in the Kalix archipelago. The north end of the island has facilities for recreational boating. The southern part, which is used for forestry, has been proposed as the site for a wind farm.

== Location ==
Bergön is 20 kilometres (12 mi) southwest of the city of Kalix in Norrbotten County. It lies to the northwest of the island of Rånön. The island is owned by a forestry company, which has large scale forestry operations. The north and south of the island are designated municipal conservation areas, while there are no special conservation rules for the central area. Sami use Bergön for winter grazing for their reindeer herds. The white-tailed eagle has been reported to nest on the island.

== History ==
The National Heritage Board has records of tar pits, an old shipbuilding site and a former fishing village. A map of Bergön from 1779 shows an area on its eastern side marked as "Old Shipyard". At that time the island would have had a good supply of long, straight, high-quality spruce that could be used for the ships. The location today is a small bay with a sandy beach. There are traces of a slipway, the foundation of a large building, and a large charcoal pit where tar would have been extracted. A barque named "Gustaf" was built on Bergön in 1776, but was wrecked in rough weather off Holmön when only 13 hours into her maiden voyage.

== Boating facilities ==
Bergön has three ports: Gårdsviken, Kohamn and Harabolaviken. The Törevägen boat club has their facility at Gårdsviken on the north side, and they also take care of the two facilities of the Kalix Municipality. There is a barbecue area, a fine hexagonal sauna and an outhouse. Kohamn is a Kalix Municipality facility in a small lagoon on the island's northeastern side. It has two floating docks, toilets, barbecues with wood and garbage containers. Harabolviken is also a municipal facility, near to Kohamn, with a floating dock, outhouse and barbecue area with wood.

== Proposed wind farm ==
In 2011 wpd Scandinavia AB said it was studying the possibility of building a wind farm in Bergön. It would have up to 31 wind turbines with a maximum overall height of 200 metres (660 ft). The wind farm would mostly lie within the recent or planned forest harvesting areas, re-using forestry roads so as to minimize environmental impact. If 31 turbines each of 3.2 MW were built, the farm could produce 360 GWH per year, rather more than the total electrical consumption of the Kalix municipality in 2009. The wind power would be sufficient to supply more than 71,000 homes with electricity. A submarine cable would be needed to link the island to the mainland.

The Norrbotten County administrative board would have to approve construction of the plant, roads and power lines. It was planned to consult with stakeholders, then submit the project for approval in late 2012. The project would not come on stream before 2015. The first public consultation was held in March 2012. Another consultation was planned for the summer so that people with summer homes within sight of the turbines could be consulted. The wind farm would be 3 to 5 kilometres (1.9 to 3.1 mi) from Degerö Börstskär and Båtön in the Luleå Municipality, which was also invited to consult. A May 2012 report said the public reaction had been generally favorable.
