= Polar Explorer (ship) =

Swedish tourist icebreaker

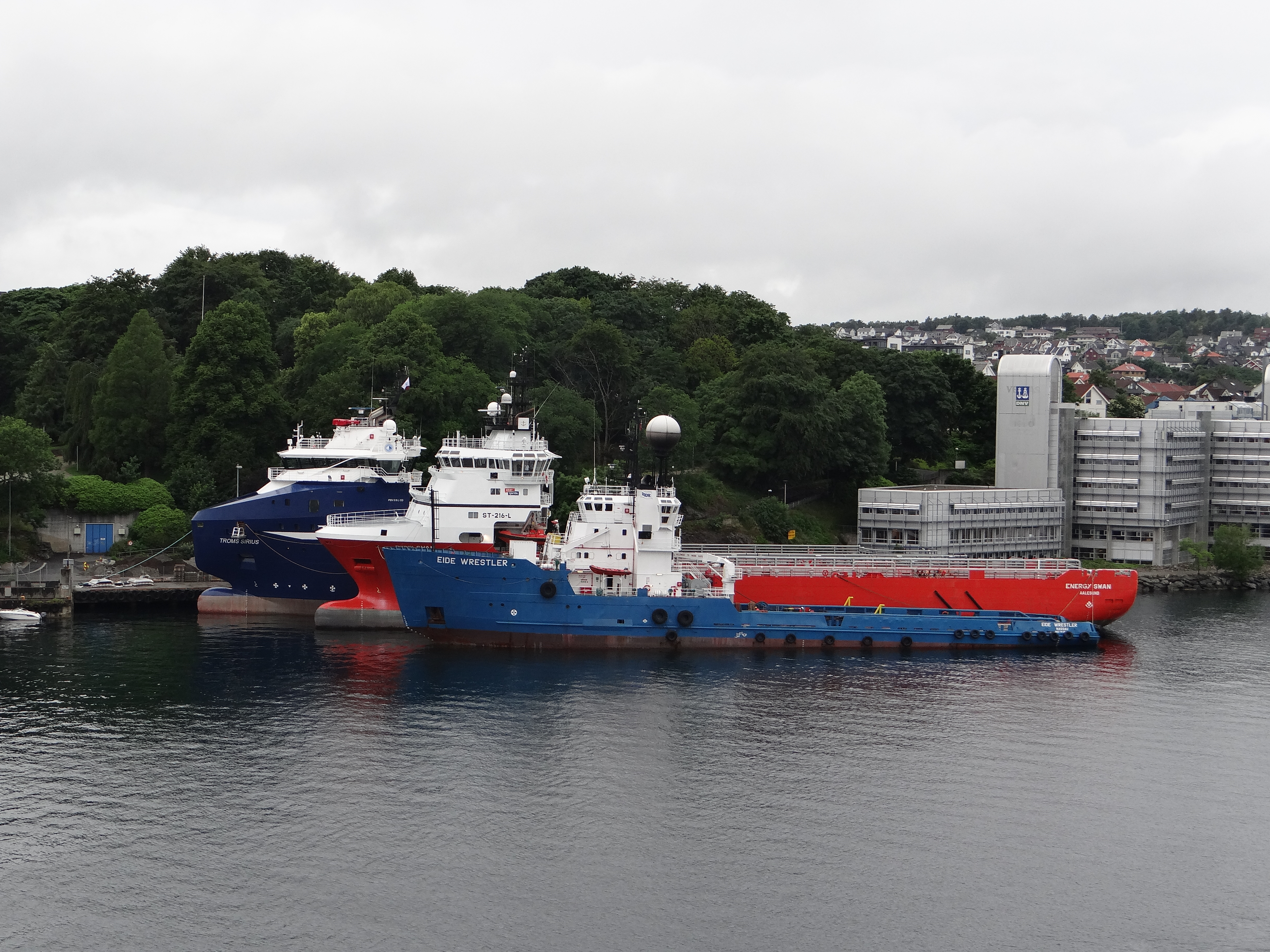
- The ship as Eide Wrestler in 2012

History
- Name: Polar Explorer
- Owner: Marine Solutions MG AB
- Builder: Elsflether Werft AG, Elsfleth, Germany
- Yard number: 394
- Laid down: 30 September 1975
- Launched: 28 March 1976
- Completed: 1976
- Identification: IMO number: 7415137

General characteristics
- Type: Anchor-handling tug/supply vessel
- Tonnage: 1,976 GT; 1,875 DWT
- Length: 78 m (256 ft)
- Beam: 14.33 m (47.0 ft)
- Draught: 6.27 m (20.6 ft)

Polar Explorer is a Swedish-flagged offshore tug and supply vessel that operates as a tourist icebreaker from Axelsvik in Kalix, northern Sweden. The vessel was built in 1976 as Schnoorturm and has IMO number 7415137.

== History ==
The vessel was built by Elsflether Werft AG in Elsfleth, Germany. TugeZine records yard number 394, a keel-laying date of 30 September 1975, a launch date of 28 March 1976.

Schnoorturm initially operated for Deutsche Dampfschiffahrt Gesellschaft Hansa of Bremen. In 1981 it entered Canadian service through Hansashore Canada and Crosbie Offshore Services in St. John's, Newfoundland and Labrador.

On 30 November 1986, an engine-room fire broke out aboard the vessel while it was at sea. The crew abandoned the vessel, which was subsequently towed to Balboa and declared a total loss. In 1987 it was acquired by Panama Air Marine Safety & Supply, renamed Baru, and taken to Conastil Shipyard in Cartagena, Colombia, for reconstruction and repair.

The vessel was subsequently acquired by A/S K/S Eide Sea Supply of Norway and lengthened by approximately 7.5 metres at Eide Contracting Shipyard. It returned to service in 1991 as Sun Wrestler.

It was renamed Statesman in 1998 and later Eide Wrestler in 2009. In December 2016 it became Polar Explorer, with Marine Solutions MG AB recorded as its Swedish owner. Gard also records Sun Wrestler as a former name of the vessel.

== Tourism operations ==
In December 2016, Finnish public broadcaster Yle reported on the introduction of Polar Explorer as a tourist icebreaker operating from Axelsvik in Kalix. The report said the second-hand vessel had been acquired from Norway and modified for tourism use in Poland, with growing demand for icebreaker excursions, particularly among visitors from Asia.

Finnish newspaper Ilta-Sanomat published a feature about an excursion aboard the icebreaker, including the passenger experience of floating in the icy water in protective suits.

In 2020, Swedish business newspaper Dagens industri described Polar Explorer as a tourist attraction operating in the Kalix archipelago.

In January 2022, Euronews featured Polar Explorer in a report on icebreaker tourism in Swedish Lapland. The report discussed the vessel's icebreaking operation and included comments from its captain about navigating through Baltic Sea ice.

A 2024 report distributed by the Associated Press described Polar Explorer as an industrial icebreaker that had been repurposed for tourism. The report discussed alterations made to increase passenger capacity, the ship's crew and tourist activities including walking on the frozen sea and floating in the water.

In February 2026, Dagens Nyheter published a report about visitors travelling to Kalix for excursions aboard Polar Explorer.

== Characteristics ==
Gard classifies Polar Explorer as an anchor-handling tug/supply vessel sailing under the Swedish flag. Its register lists a gross tonnage of 1,976, deadweight of 1,875 tonnes and a build year of 1976.

TugeZine records a length of 78 m (256 ft), beam of 14.33 m (47.0 ft) and draught of 6.27 m (20.6 ft). It also records two Atlas-M.A.K. 8M-551-AK main engines with a total output of approximately 9,462 bhp.
