= Lillfårögrynnan =

Island in the country of Sweden

Coordinates: 65°47′50″N 22°47′12″E

Lillfårögrynnan is a Swedish island belonging to the Kalix archipelago. The island is a part of Fåröholmarna together with Lillfåröholmen and Flaragrynnorna. Lillfårögrynnan means shallowness to Lill-Fårön, but over time it has become an island. The island is located south of Lill-Fårön and has no shore connection.
