= Ängesån =

Forest river in Sweden

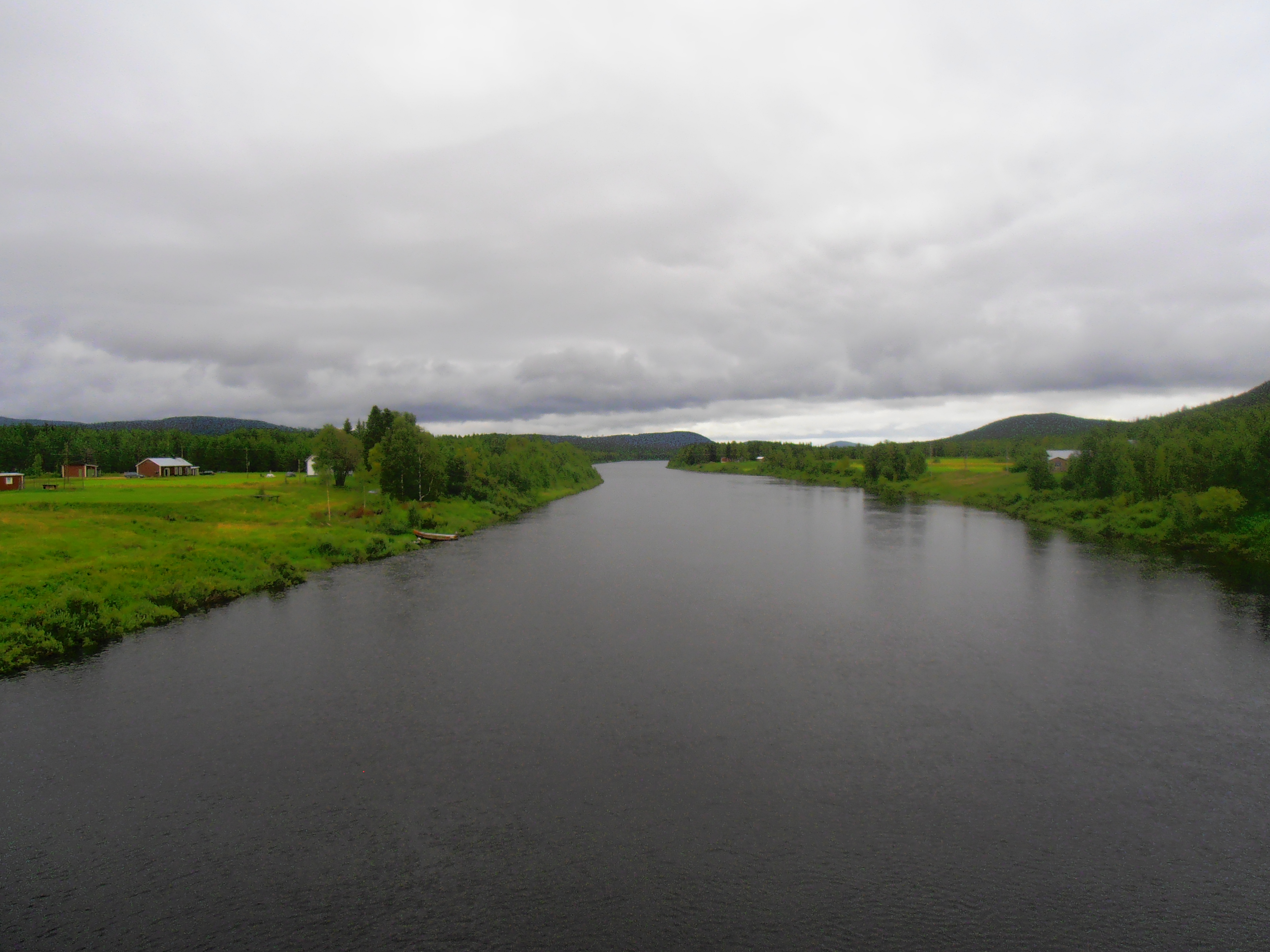
- The Ängesån from bridge at Ängeså Samiby, August 2016.

Location
- Country: Sweden

Physical characteristics
- Length: 20 km (12 mi)

The Ängesån is a forest river in Sweden and is the largest tributary of the Kalixälven River. The river flows into Vettasjärvi and is about 20 kilometres long. Between Vettasjärvi and the confluence with the Valtiojoki, it is called Vettasjoki. The largest tributaries are the Linaälven, which merges at Linafallet and the Bönälven, which reaches Ängesån through Tvärån.

The river is unaffected by hydropower development.
