= Binnören =

Island in the country of Sweden

Coordinates: 65.770°N 23.372°E

Binnören is a Swedish island belonging to the Kalix archipelago. It is connected to Rönnören by a road over a dam, which is connected to the mainland by a road. The island is uninhabited.
