= Ol-Knuts =

Island in the Kalix archipelago, Sweden

Coordinates: 65°47′12″N 22°47′34″E

Ol-Knuts is a Swedish island belonging to the Kalix archipelago. The island is located 400 meter south of Fåröholmarna. The island has no shore connection, and only a summer cottage as building.
