= Trondenes Church =

- Trondenes kirke
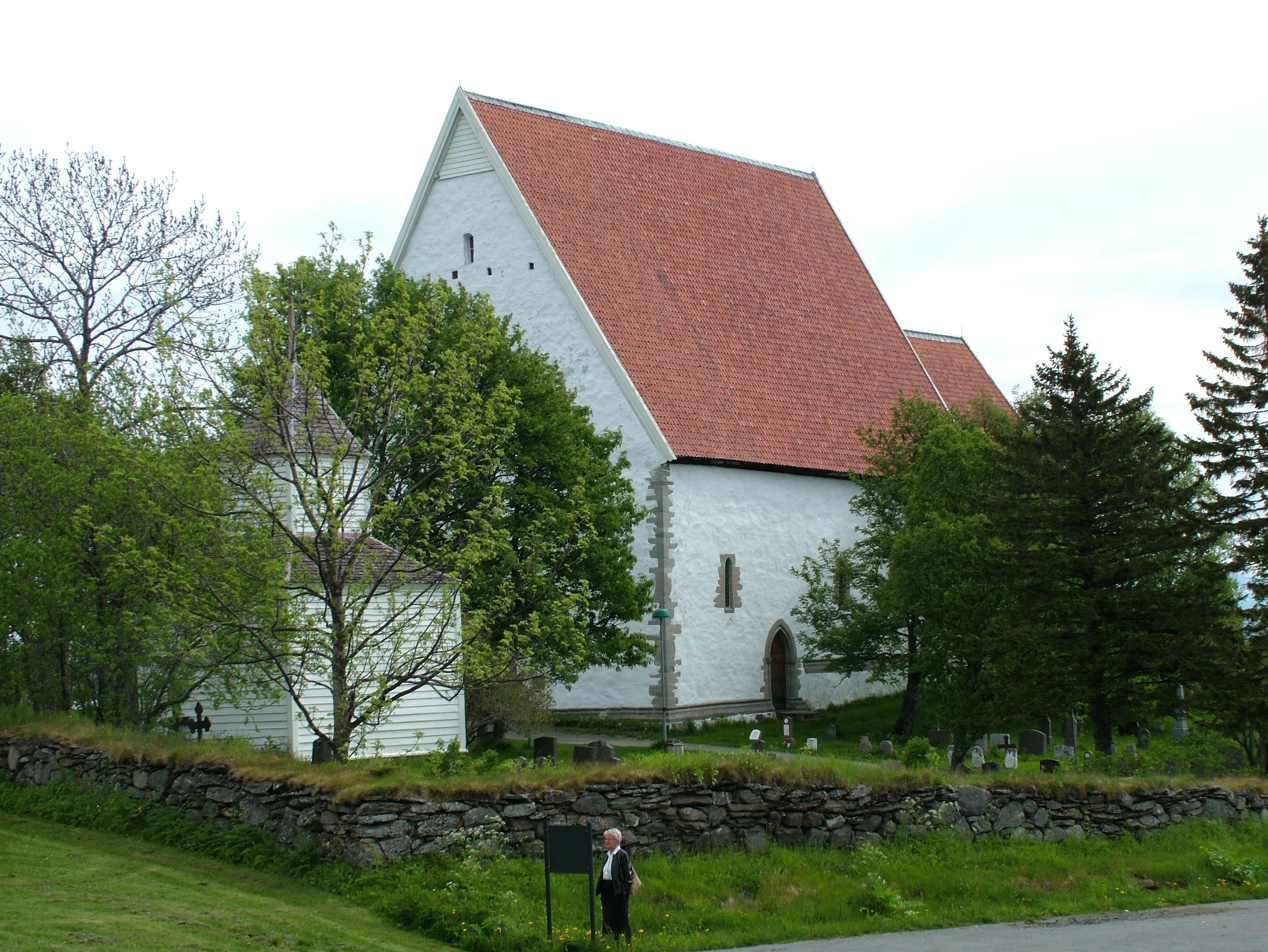
- View of the church
- Trondenes Church
- 68.82193339°N 16.5628402°E
- Location: Harstad Municipality, Troms
- Country: Norway
- Denomination: Church of Norway
- Previous denomination: Catholic Church
- Churchmanship: Evangelical Lutheran

History
- Status: Parish church
- Founded: 11th century
- Consecrated: c. 1435

Architecture
- Functional status: Active
- Architectural type: Long church
- Completed: c. 1435 (591 years ago)

Specifications
- Capacity: 300
- Materials: Stone

Administration
- Diocese: Nord-Hålogaland
- Deanery: Trondenes prosti
- Parish: Trondenes
- Norwegian Cultural Heritage Site
- Type: Church
- Status: Automatically protected
- ID: 85673

Trondenes Church (Norwegian: Trondenes kirke) is the northernmost medieval stone church of Norway and the world's northernmost surviving medieval building. It is a parish church of the Church of Norway in Harstad Municipality in Troms county, Norway. It is located on the northern edge of the town of Harstad. It is the main church for the Trondenes parish which is part of the Trondenes prosti (deanery) in the Diocese of Nord-Hålogaland. The white, stone church was built in a long church style around the year 1435 using plans drawn up by an unknown architect. The church seats about 300 people.

Though frequently referred to as a 13th-century church, dating based on dendrochronology places its completion shortly after 1434. Compared to the other ten north Norwegian medieval stone churches, Trondenes Church is well preserved, the exterior condition still close to the original state. The nave is 22.6 metres (74 ft) long and the chancel is 13.5 metres (44 ft), making it one of the largest medieval churches of rural Norway. In the late Medieval period, Trondenes served as the main church centre of Northern Norway.

The church is best known for its rich decorations, including three gothic triptychs, one of which was earlier attributed to the German Hanseatic artist Bernt Notke, although modern art historians now doubt the attribution. The baroque pulpit is equipped with an hourglass to allow the minister to time long sermons. The organ dates from the late 18th century. In the choir section, one can see remnants of medieval frescoes.

== History ==
The present church is presumably the third church on the site, the first stave church was likely built on the site during the 11th century, followed by another building in the 12th century. The second church was fortified with stone walls and ramparts, remnants of which can still be seen around the church today. The present stone church was built around the year 1435. The church bells once hung from a turret but, as the turret has long since been demolished, the bells now ring from a small tower in the graveyard.

In 1814, this church served as an election church (Norwegian: valgkirke). Together with more than 300 other parish churches across Norway, it was a polling station for elections to the 1814 Norwegian Constituent Assembly which wrote the Constitution of Norway. This was Norway's first national elections. Each church parish was a constituency that elected people called "electors" who later met together in each county to elect the representatives for the assembly that was to meet at Eidsvoll Manor later that year.

== Media gallery ==
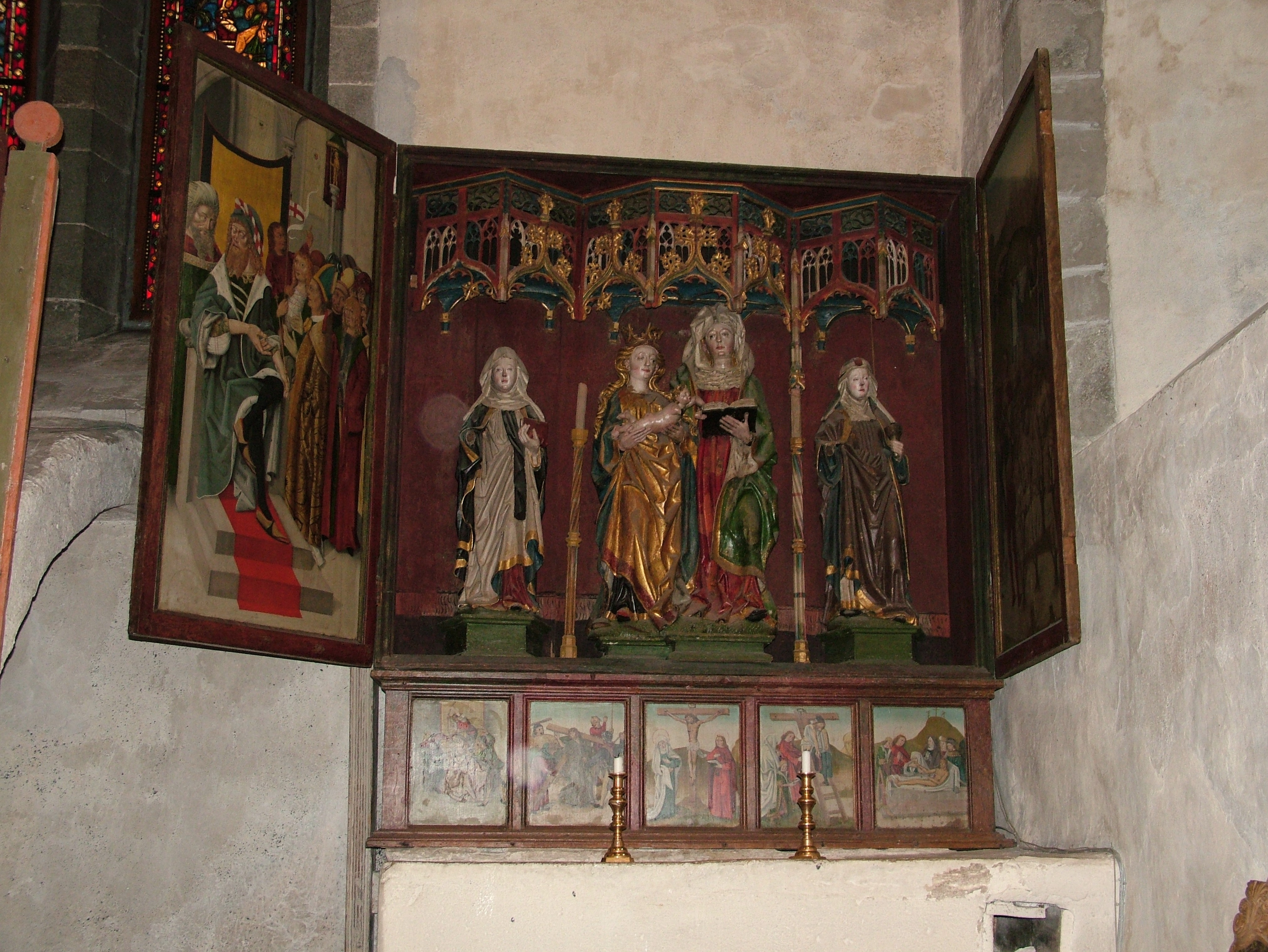
Small altar in the church

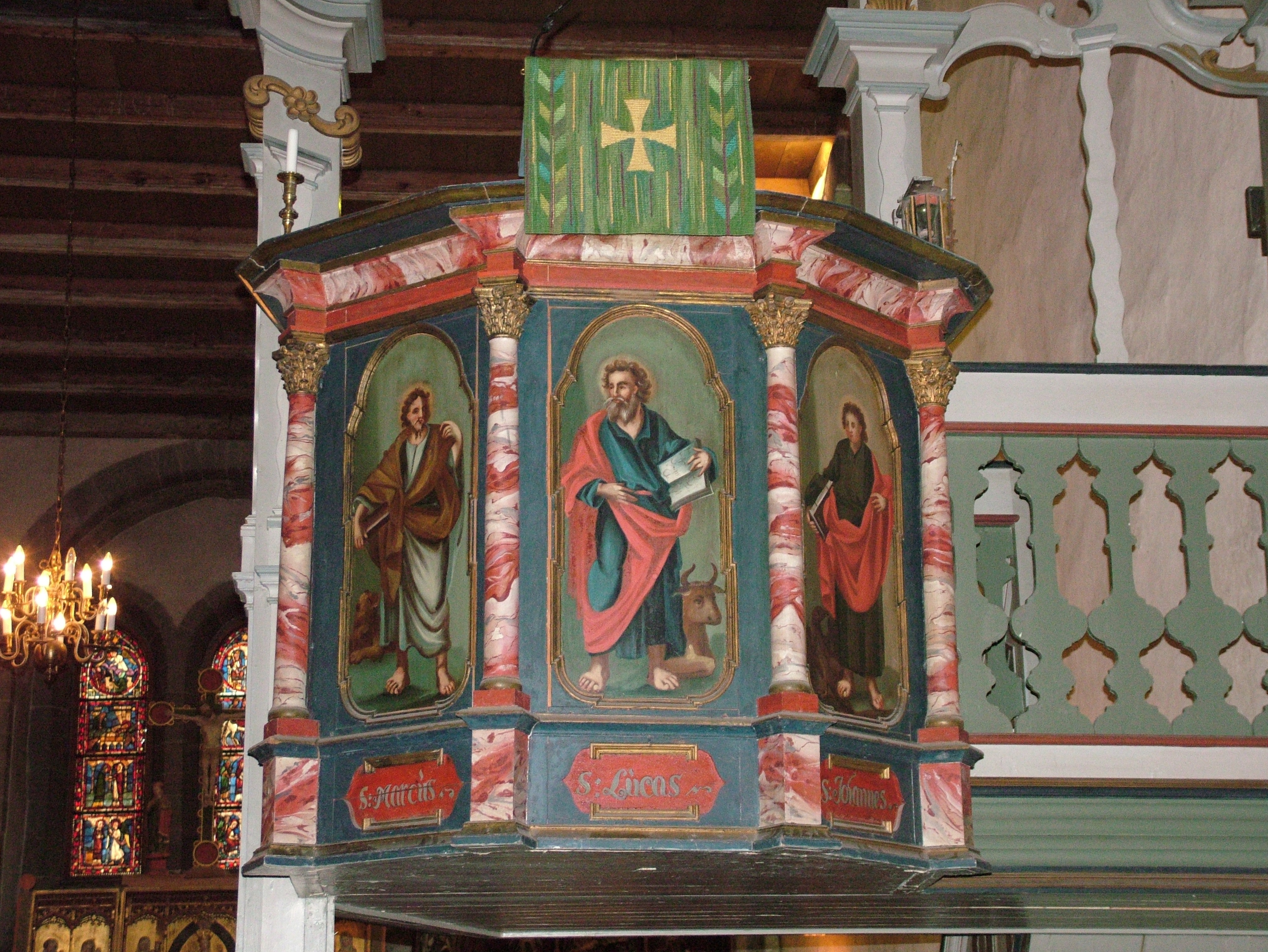
Pulpit of Trondenes Church

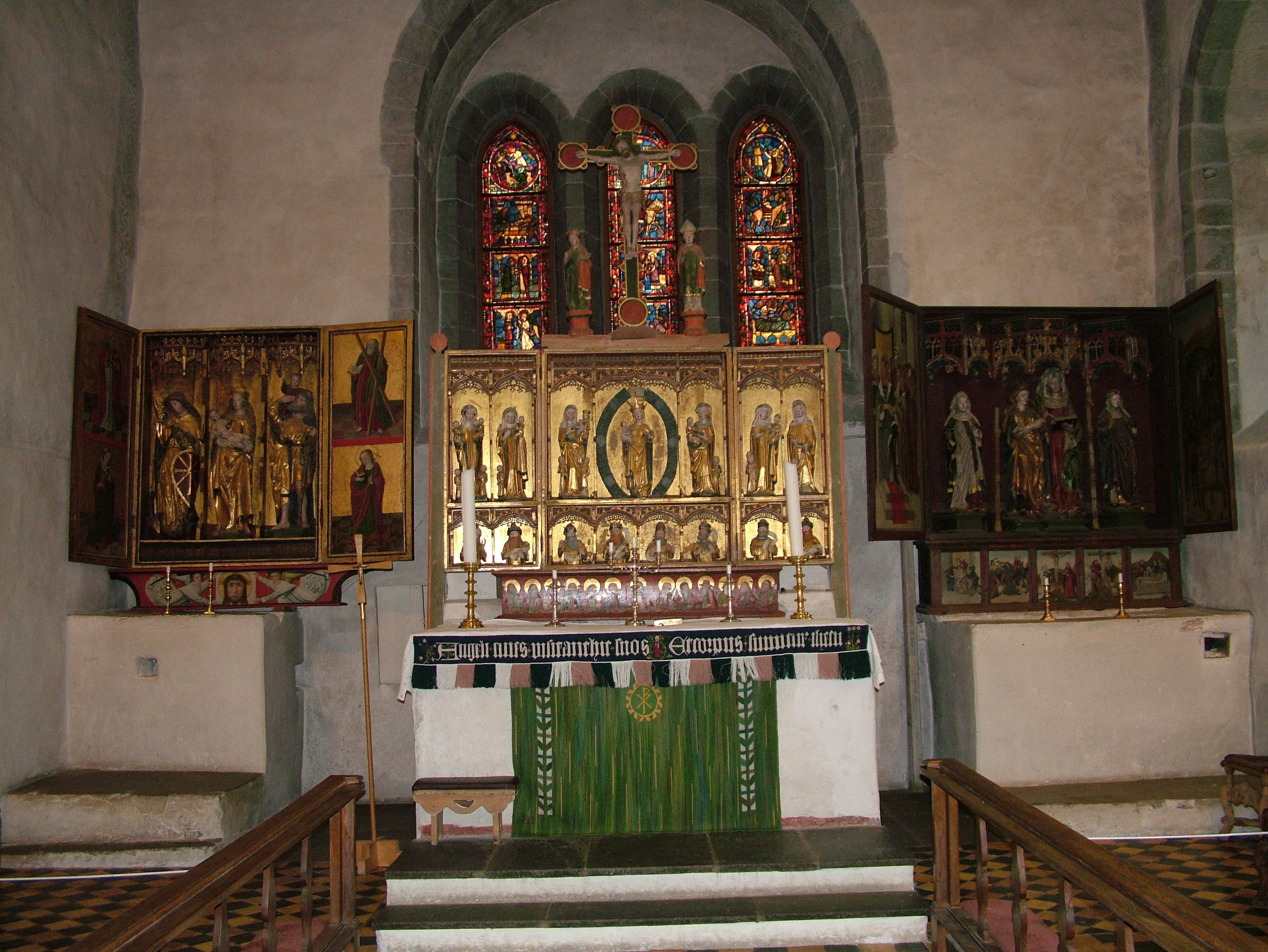
Inner view of Trondenes Church

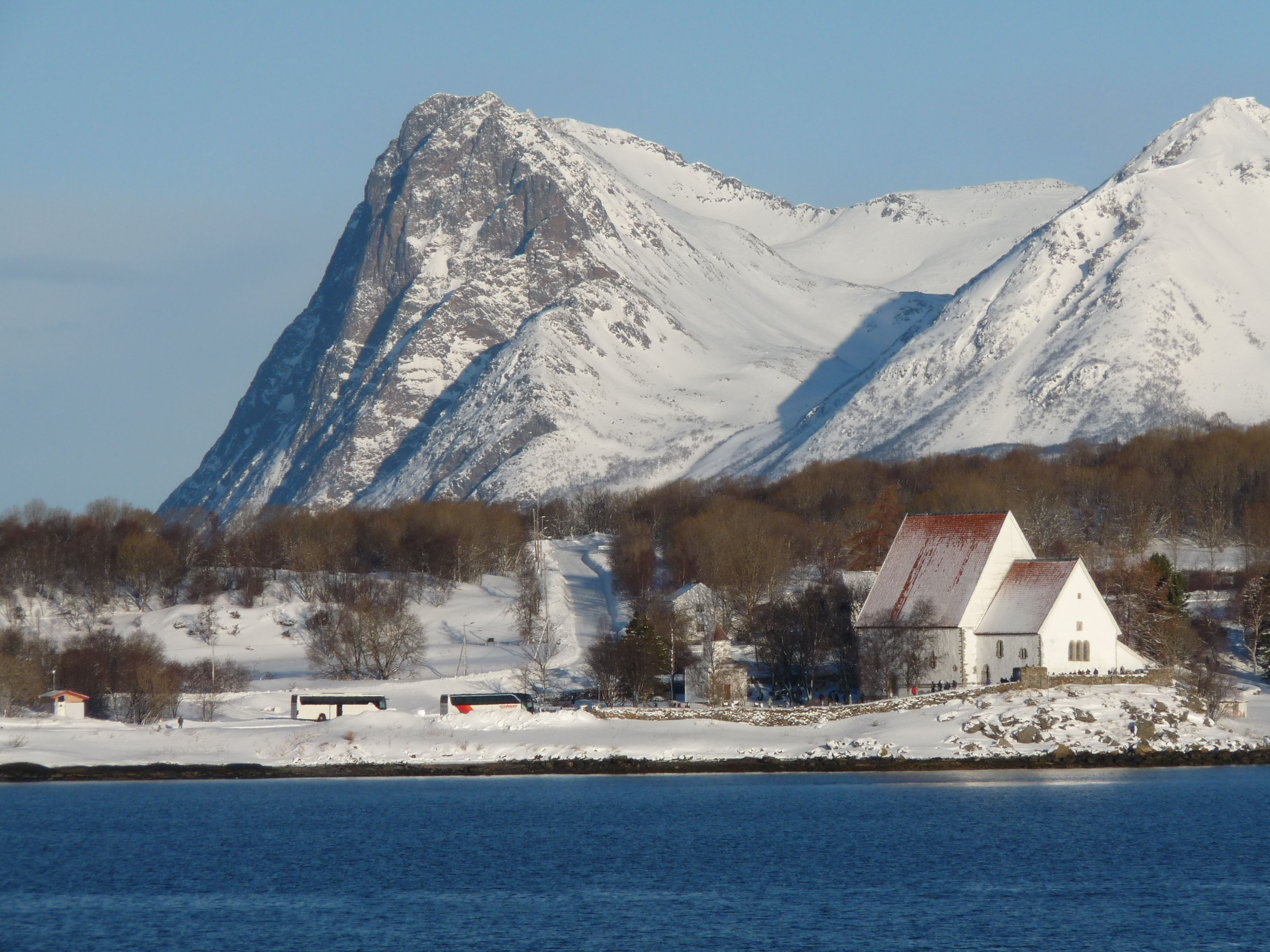
View of the church from a distance

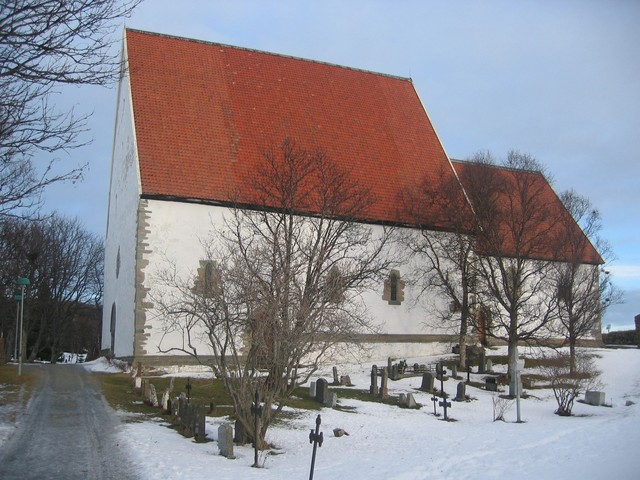
Side view of the church

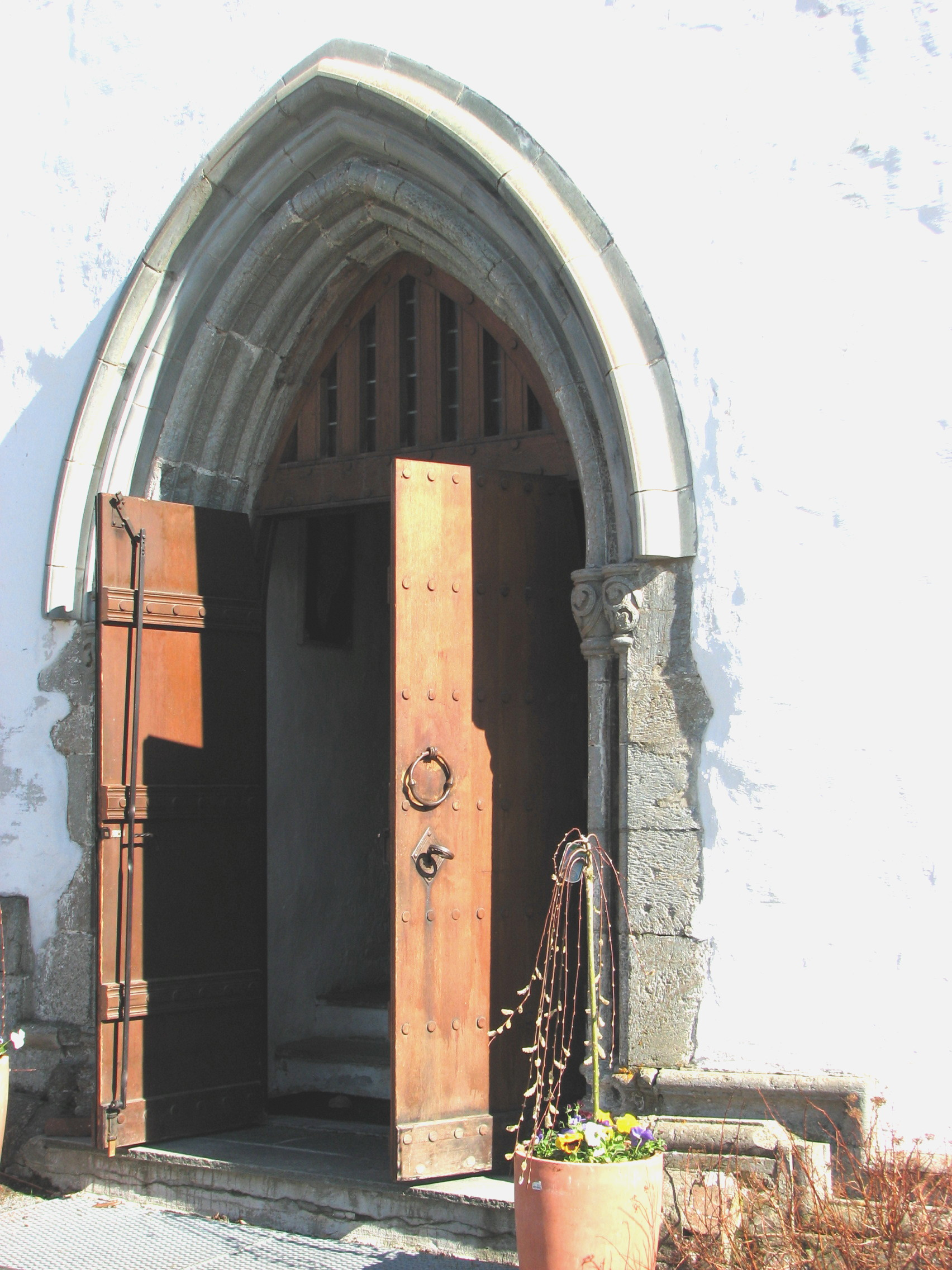
View of the door

== See also ==
- List of churches in Nord-Hålogaland
- Kalix Church, the northernmost medieval church in Sweden
