= Kaalasjärvi =

Kaalasjärvi Gálásjávri
- village
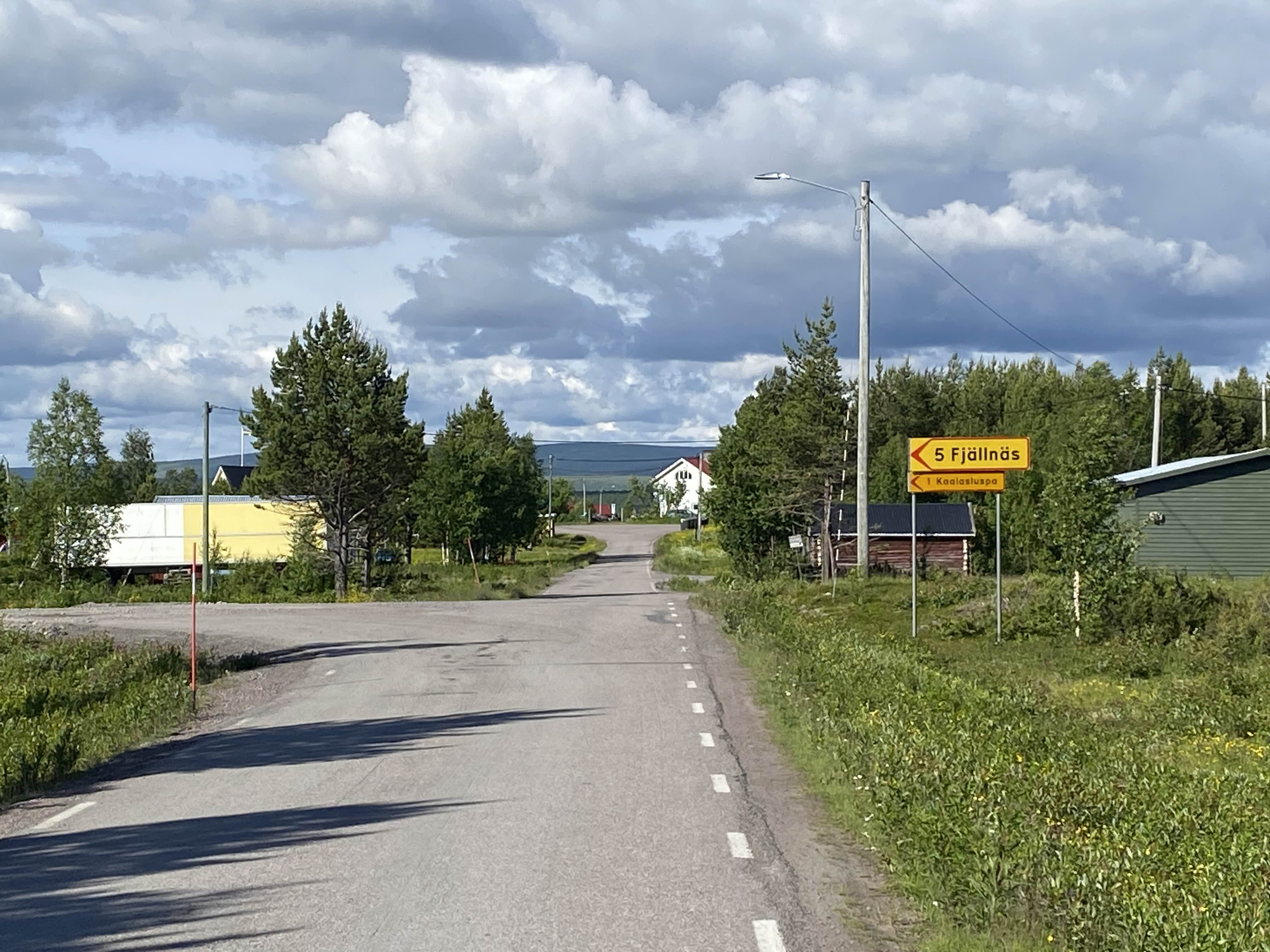

- Location within Norrbotten Location within Sweden
- Coordinates: 67°45′N 20°1′E
- Country: Sweden
- Municipality: Kiruna Municipality
- County: Norrbotten County
- Province: Lapland

Population
  - Total: 43
- Time zone: UTC+1 (CET)
  - Summer (DST): UTC+2 (CEST)

Kaalasjärvi (Northern Sámi: Gálásjávri) is a village in Kiruna municipality, Norrbotten county, Sweden. It lies by the lake of the same name, which is part of the Kalix River.

== History ==
The first permanent inhabitant was likely a man called Johan Olsson Keloka (b. 1780), but little is known about him. In 1826 Mickel Henriksson from Killinge (1797-1845) moved to what would become Kaalasjärvi. By 1830 he had established his homestead and was officially granted the right to settle, along with 25 years free of tax. At the time the place was known as Luspaniemi, which in the Tornedalian way he assumed as his name. In the 1880s Mickel Mickelsson (1832-1903), son of Mickel Henriksson, would move and found the village Puoltsa. By the survey of 1890 the settlement had 49 inhabitants. According to Ratsit as of 7 July 2025 there were 43 people above the age of 16 living in Kaalasjärvi.

Through Kaalasjärvi goes the only road to the settlements of Kaalasluspa and Fjällnäs, which lie in Gällivare municipality on the opposite side of the Kalix River.
