= Björn (Kalix) =

Island in the country of Sweden

- Location within Sweden

Geography
- Coordinates: 65.748291°N 23.589592°E
- Adjacent to: Bay of Bothnia
- Area: 25 ha (62 acres)

Administration
- Sweden
- Province: Norrbotten
- Municipality: Kalix Municipality

Demographics
- Population: Uninhabited

Björn is an island in the north of the Swedish sector of the Bay of Bothnia, in the Kalix archipelago, the centre of a nature reserve of the same name.

== Location ==
Björn is about 2 kilometres (1.2 mi) east of Granön, and 4 kilometres (2.5 mi) west of Seskarö. The island is relatively new, formed through post-glacial rebound. It emerged from the sea about 500 years ago. The highest point is now about 5 metres (16 ft) above sea level. The island has an area of 25 hectares (62 acres). There are traces of an abandoned fishing village on the southwest of the island, with the foundations of two houses, and an ancient maze to the east. There is a dilapidated and uninhabited fishing cabin on the beach on the west side.

== Nature Reserve ==
In 1969 the nearby wooded islets of the Björnrevet reef were declared a bird sanctuary. In 1997 Björn and the smaller islets of Björnrevet, Björngrundet and Malgrundet were made a state-owned nature reserve, the furthest east in the Kalix archipelago. It covers 342 hectares (850 acres) of which 28.2 hectares (70 acres) is land, including Björn island.

Bjorn is mostly covered by mature spruce, but in some of the drier parts pine dominates. In the centre of the south portion a large storm felled many trees in 1981-82. The Björnrevet islets are partly covered in deciduous forest, set aside as a bird sanctuary in 1969. They are used for breeding by terns, ducks, redshank and turnstone. Björngrundet has healthy hardwood forests. Malgrundet is an islet at the west end of the reserve dominated by juniper tree stands, with birch trees and a group of aspens.
