= Getskär =

Swedish islands

Getskär and Renskär
- Location within Norrbotten Location within Sweden

Geography
- Coordinates: 65.649429°N 22.966869°E
- Adjacent to: Bay of Bothnia
- Area: 10 km^{2} (3.9 sq mi)

Administration
- Sweden
- Province: Norrbotten
- Municipality: Kalix Municipality

Demographics
- Population: Uninhabited

Getskär and Renskär are two islands in the north of the Swedish sector of the Bay of Bothnia, in the Kalix archipelago, that have become joined through uplift of the land due to post-glacial rebound and are now one.

== Location ==
Getskär and Renskär are in the small Storöns archipelago, part of the larger Kalix archipelago, which itself is part of the Norrbotten archipelago that encompasses all the Swedish islands in the north of the Bay of Bothnia. Until recently they were separate islands, but have been joined due to uplift. As of 2013 there were no tour boats so a sail or power boat, or perhaps a canoe or kayak, would be needed to reach the island. Getskär is about 1 kilometre (0.62 mi) south of Rånön. Other islands in the group are Hastaskäret and Berghamn.

== History ==
The island was once a major center for fishermen and seal hunters. There remain traces of simple dwellings, later fishermen's cottages and stone mounds on which nets would have been dried. There is a maze made out of boulders, whose purpose may have been to appease the gods and ensure a good catch of fish. There is a small old fishing village from the late 18th century in the southeast. There are also the remains of a chapel from this period that has been allowed to decay.

== Description ==
Getskär/Renskär is part of the Likskär nature reserve. The port of Getskärsviken is well protected except from strong easterly winds. The harbor depth is 3 metres (9.8 ft) and has berths for fifteen boats. There is a sandy beach in the southern part of the bay, a stone pier and a floating dock. There are barbecues on the beach with seats, firewood storage, trails, restrooms, and a sauna. Renskär forms the larger, southern part of the combined island. A trail leads from the sandy beach to the old fishing village in the south, passing the maze and running along a rocky ridge before reaching the village. The trail then leads back to the beach by another route.
