= Berghamn (Kalix) =

Island in the country of Sweden

- Location within Norrbotten Location within Sweden

Geography
- Coordinates: 65.673297°N 23.004527°E
- Adjacent to: Bay of Bothnia
- Area: 10 km^{2} (3.9 sq mi)

Administration
- Sweden
- Province: Norrbotten
- Municipality: Kalix Municipality

Demographics
- Population: Uninhabited

Berghamn is an island in the north of the Swedish sector of the Bay of Bothnia, in the Kalix archipelago.

== Description ==
Berghamn is about 1 kilometre (0.62 mi) east of the southern tip of Rånön, the largest island in the archipelago. The north side of the island has a 200 metres (660 ft) sandy beach. A cold spring near the beach provides clean water. The island is rugged, and is covered in moors and forest. The central hill contains caves, and can be reached by a footpath that crosses the island. There is a dramatic view from the summit of the neighboring islands of Likskär, Renskär, Getskär, Rånön and Hastaskäret.
