= Töre River =

Coordinates: 66.03578°N 22.57452°E

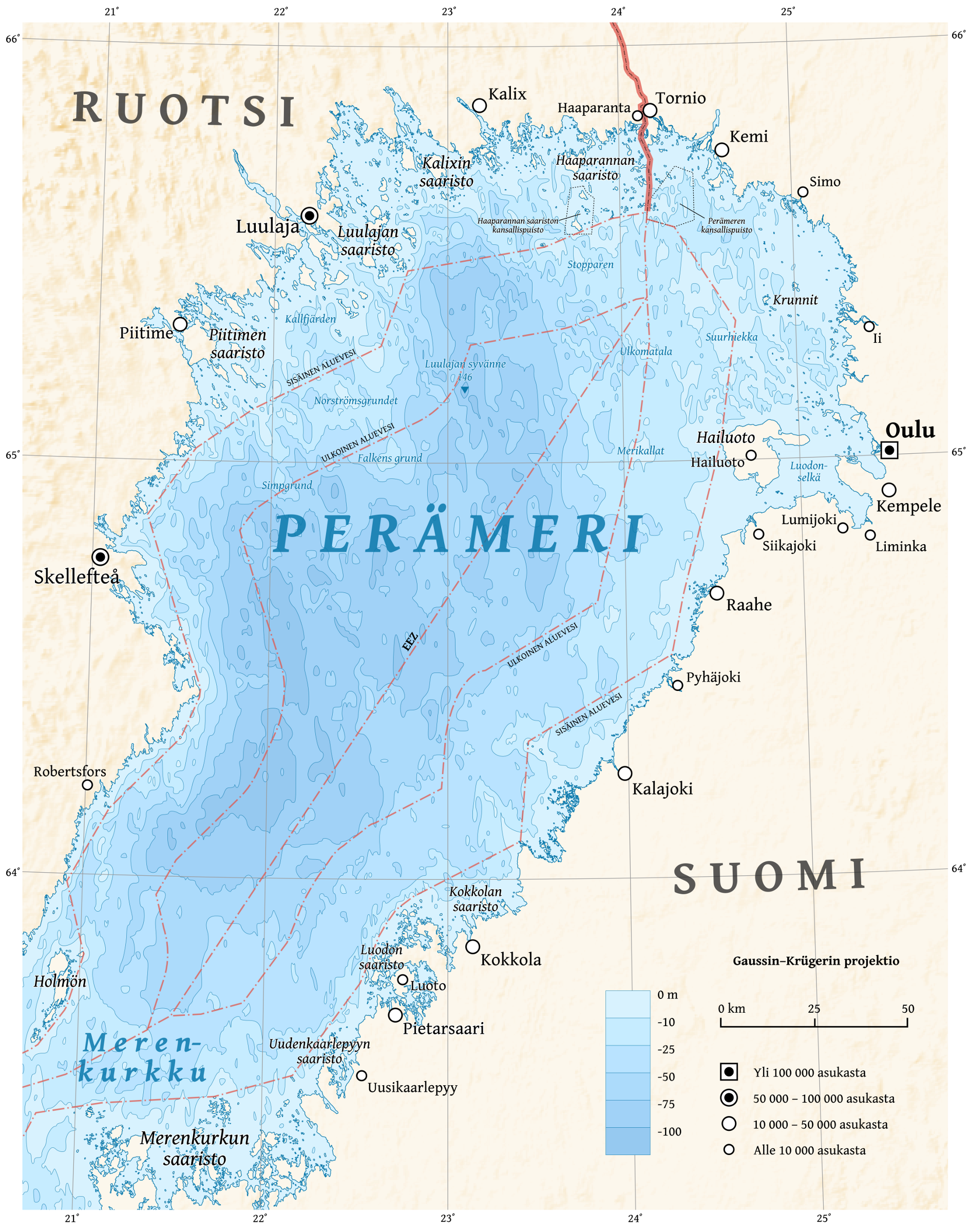
- Finnish map of the Bothnian Bay
- Native name: Töreälven (Swedish); Töre älv (Swedish)

Location
- Country: Sweden
- County: Norrbotten

Physical characteristics
- Source: Tjäruträsket
  - location: Kalix Municipality, Sweden
  - elevation: 89 m (292 ft)
- Mouth: Törefjärden, Bothnian Bay
  - location: Sweden
- Length: 40 km (25 mi)
- Basin size: 448.6 km^{2} (173.2 sq mi)

Töre River (Swedish: Töreälven or Töre älv) is a river in Norrbotten in Sweden. It discharges into Törefjärden, which is the northernmost part of the Bothnian Bay and therefore of the Gulf of Bothnia and of the Baltic Sea.
