= Malören =

Island in the Kalix archipelago, Sweden

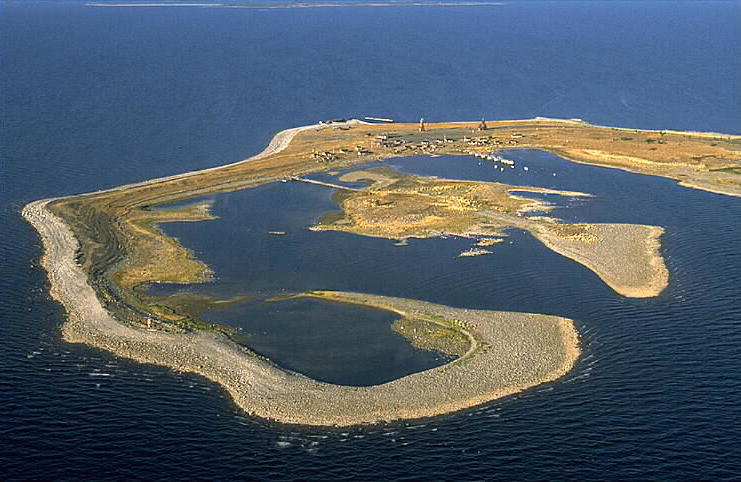

- Location within Norrbotten Location within Sweden

Geography
- Coordinates: 65.528°N 23.557°E
- Area: 0.85 km^{2} (0.33 sq mi)

Administration
- Sweden
- Island: Kalix archipelago

Demographics
- Languages: Swedish

Malören (Swedish: [ˈmɑ̂ːˌlœːrɛn], locally [maˈlœːɳ]; Finnish: Maluri) is an island in the Kalix archipelago of northern Sweden. It lies to the southwest of Sandskär, but is not part of the Haparanda Archipelago National Park. Malören has the shape of an atoll, with sandbanks around an inland sea. It came into existence about 1,500 years ago when the area began to rise by 85 cm (33 in) per century. Since 1997, the island has been a nature reserve, encompassing 181 ha (450 acres). On the island is a chapel, built in 1769, and a lighthouse, built in 1851.

== History ==
The island attracted fishermen in the 1600s and 1700s, especially from the Finnish side of the nearby border. Attracted by the herring, a fisherman came from Torneå (Tornio) and from Karlö (Hailuoto) in Ostrobothnia setting up two separate communities on the island with up to 200 people living there during the summer. A pole marker was set up in 1725, and ten years later made into a beacon (a painted marker that functions as a lighthouse but has no light). Fishing became very productive during the second half of the 18th century when ten percent of the catch used to be donated to the priest in Torneå. As a result of the island's prosperity, in 1768, a chapel was established there on the orders of the magistrate of Torneå. With its tall spire, it became known as "Skärgårdens domkyrka" ("cathedral of the islands").

Malören became a pilot station in 1827. In 1851, a 17.5 m (57 ft) tall lighthouse was built, the first to be designed by Gustaf von Heidenstam. A somewhat smaller lighthouse was built in 1891 to save manpower; however, this newer tower was closed down in about 1910, and the older one was again placed in service, now with a gas-powered light; the keepers were withdrawn at the same time and pilots took over their maintenance. When telephone service arrived in 1932, the pilot station was combined with that on another island, Erikören, and Malören no longer had a pilot living there year-round. In 1958, the lighthouse was replaced with a Dalén light.

The first dock was not constructed on the island until 1929. To assist with launching the pilot boat when the wind was in a difficult direction, there used to be railed from the north to the south side of the island; the boat was pulled on a trolley to where it could more conveniently be launched. A concrete harbor was built over four years in the 1950s but had to be abandoned in 1967 because of erosion. The harbor can be accessed at its easterly breakwater in a calm sea by boats with a draft up to 2 metres (6 ft 7 in), although this can change due to the ongoing deposition of sediment on the seafloor. Other parts of the harbor are filled with rocks and sand that have been brought in with the tide. Line markers fixed with lights on the outer leading line fitted with white light provide the navigation guide to boats. The inner line is fitted with red lights and the harbor is sheltered from southerly gales. When very strong southerly/south-westerly winds are blowing, the harbor approach is difficult. The old Swedish “Domänverket” wooden jetty, now known as “Sveaskog”, was rebuilt in the middle of the 1970s.

== Geography ==
Malören Island is situated in the Gulf of Bothnia, situated approximately 30 kilometres (19 mi) from the coast of Sweden. Kalix is away towards the coast. The horseshoe-shaped island is about 3 kilometres (1.9 mi) in length. The lie of the land is flat with a submarine gully recorded, extending approximately 20 kilometres (12 mi) in a northwesterly direction. The island was declared a nature reserve in 1997 and titled “Nature 2000” covering an area of 185 hectares (460 acres). Seismic profiling has confirmed that the Muhos formation encompasses Bothnian Bay.

== Landmarks ==
Two important landmarks on the island are the Malören Lighthouse and the chapel. The island also has a labyrinth, a wreck and debris of a navigation marker dated to 1725.

The existing Malören Lighthouse was established in 1851 and re-activated between 1891 and 1910. Its octagonal-shaped, wood-shingled tower is tapered and measures 17 metres (56 ft) in height. It is fitted with a lantern and gallery with a focal plane height of 22 metres (72 ft). The light flashes twice every 12 seconds in white-red-green. While the tower is painted red, the lantern dome is white. The lighthouse is under the jurisdiction of the Swedish National Property Board.

As a result of the economic progress of the island due to fishing operations, a church was established here at the orders of the magistrate of Torneå town. The octagonal wooden chapel was initially known as Prince Karl's fishing church. It was erected in 1768 and was later given a shingled roof; this was a popular church style around Bothnian Bay at the time. Because of its tall spire, the church also functioned as a navigational marker for seafaring vessels. Still functional, Sunday services are held there during the summer.

== Wildlife ==
Since 1997, Malören has been a nature reserve covering 182 hectares (450 acres). Vegetation on the rock-strewn island is reported to be gradually increasing. Mountain ash are taking root and there are plenty of sea peas, tufted vetch and fireweed. Rarer species include sleepy primrose and southern adderstongue. The island is even more interesting for birdlife, located as it is at the south end of the archipelago. It is used both as a resting place and for nesting. Arctic terns abound but there are also black-legged kittiwakes, Arctic skuas, large and small plovers, ruddy turnstones and redshanks as well as many of species of gull.
