= Halsön, Kalix =

Island in the country of Sweden

Halsön
- Location within Norrbotten Location within Sweden

Geography
- Coordinates: 65.726423°N 23.502137°E
- Adjacent to: Bay of Bothnia
- Area: 10 km^{2} (3.9 sq mi)

Administration
- Sweden
- Province: Norrbotten
- Municipality: Kalix Municipality

Demographics
- Population: Uninhabited

Halsön is an island in the north of the Swedish sector of the Bay of Bothnia, in the Kalix archipelago.

== Location ==
Halsön lies to the east of the mouth of the Kalix River, about 15 kilometres (9.3 mi) southeast of Karlsborg. It is about 1 kilometre (0.62 mi) west of Granön. There is a beach on the east of the island, with large dunes. For visitors there are fireplaces, seating areas and rubbish bins.
