= Granön (Kalix) =

Island in the country of Sweden

- Location within Sweden

Geography
- Coordinates: 65.733193°N 23.542213°E
- Adjacent to: Bay of Bothnia

Administration
- Sweden
- Province: Norrbotten
- Municipality: Kalix Municipality

Granön is an island in the north of the Swedish sector of the Bay of Bothnia, in the Kalix archipelago.

== Description ==
Granön is about 1 kilometre (0.62 mi) east of Halsön. The two islands and smaller islets and reefs lie in Halsöfjärden, a stretch of water south of the mainland of the Kalix Municipality. A designated inland waterway from the west to Haparanda and Tornio passes to the north of Halsön and Granön, south of Björn and north of Seskarö. The island consists of two former islands which have merged in the last few centuries due to post-glacial rebound. The highest points are in the centers of the former islands. There are summer cottages at the north and south ends of the elongated island. Most of the island is forested.

The Kalix Municipality has said that stated that Granön is of general interest for nature conservation, since it is a botanically valuable island with high natural value. A February 2013 report for the Kalix Municipality recommended a 200-metre (660-foot) expansion of the northwestern part of Granön, an undeveloped beach with no buildings made up of barren shingle banks and a sparse forest. The purpose of this and similar expansion of other islands in the municipality was to provide additional land for recreational use while avoiding impact on the natural environment.
