= Stora Trutskär =

Island in the country of Sweden

- Location within Norrbotten Location within Sweden

Geography
- Coordinates: 65.760660°N 23.375073°E
- Adjacent to: Bay of Bothnia
- Area: 10 km^{2} (3.9 sq mi)

Administration
- Sweden
- Province: Norrbotten
- Municipality: Kalix Municipality

Demographics
- Population: Uninhabited

Stora Trutskär (or simply Trutskär) is an island in the northwest of the Swedish sector of the Bay of Bothnia, in the Kalix archipelago. It has a beach area used for recreation, but is mostly covered by a nature reserve.

== Location ==
Stora Trutskär is located in the central part of Kalix archipelago about 5 kilometres (3.1 mi) east of Storön. It lies on the east side of the bay where the Kalix River enters the Bay of Bothnia, about 6 kilometres (3.7 mi) southeast of Karlsborg. In the northwest of the island there is a sandy beach and large sand dunes. Stora Trutskär holds the clubhouse for the Kalix Sail and Motorboat Club (Kalix Segel och Motorbåtssällskap). Facilities include a hosted cabin, playhouse and playground for children, outdoor grills and barbecue house.

== Nature reserve ==
Since 1997 66 hectares (160 acres) of the island have been set aside as a nature reserve. The reserve covers the entire island except for the beach area in the northwest, as well as two reefs to the east of the island. The forest has not been used for forestry, but people have extracted wood for home consumption. The best woods are found in the center of the southern part of the island. A large storm in 1982 threw down a lot of trees on the east side, and they have been replaced by brushwood. There is a swath of limestone bedrock near the reserve. The lime from this rock gives calcareous soils that support a rich flora. Visitors may camp and make a fire if they bring firewood, but not directly on the rocks. They may hike, pick berries and mushrooms and fish, but must not harm the flora and fauna.
