= Stora Huvön =

Island in the Kalix archipelago, Sweden

- Location within Norrbotten Location within Sweden

Geography
- Coordinates: 65.677371°N 22.887512°E
- Adjacent to: Bay of Bothnia
- Area: 10 km^{2} (3.9 sq mi)

Administration
- Sweden
- Province: Norrbotten
- Municipality: Kalix Municipality

Demographics
- Population: Uninhabited

Stora Huvön is an island in the northwest of the Swedish sector of the Bay of Bothnia, in the Kalix archipelago.

== Description ==
Stora Huvön was voted one of Sweden's most lovely islands in a nationwide poll. It has a fine, natural harbor protected from most winds, with a sandy beach. The beach is very shallow within about 20 metres (66 ft) of the shore, then quickly becomes much deeper. Spruce, pine and birch woods surround the bay. To the north of the bay there is another large sandy beach, good for swimming.

The western part of the island is rocky, and in several places vertical cliff rise straight from the sea. From the highest point of the island there is a panoramic view of islands in the Kalix and Luleå archipelagos. The island is bisected by a broad and deep gorge, with rock walls as much as 25 to 30 metres (82 to 98 ft) high, and with lesser ravines leading from it. A field of shingle extends across the island, made up of small stones polished by glacial action. In some parts they are moss-covered. There is a small, ancient maze in the center of the shingle field, beside a path that crosses the island.
