= Likskär, Kalix =

Island in the country of Sweden

Likskär
- Location within Norrbotten Location within Sweden

Geography
- Coordinates: 65.641783°N 23.03866°E
- Adjacent to: Bay of Bothnia
- Area: 0.4 km^{2} (0.15 sq mi)

Administration
- Sweden
- Province: Norrbotten
- Municipality: Kalix Municipality

Demographics
- Population: Uninhabited

Likskär is an island in the north of the Swedish sector of the Bay of Bothnia in the Kalix archipelago and a nature reserve that covers part of this and neighboring islands.

== Island ==
Likskär is about 4 kilometres (2.5 mi) southeast of the southern tip of Rånön, the largest island in the archipelago. The nearest mainland port is Storön, Kalix. Likskär island is rocky, and contains an old fishing village. There is some sparse forest, but most of the island is covered with rocks. The ground cover is rich in flora and supports diverse fauna. There are many birds of different species.

Likskär is relatively new, as are the other islands in the region, having formed from post-glacial rebound after the last ice age and emerged from the sea after around 500 AD. This process continues, with the land rising by about 85 centimetres (33 in) per century. The existing islands expand and new islands slowly emerge. As the islands emerge they are battered by waves and ice forming large fields of rubble. The bedrock and the boulder beaches consist of granite with large eyes of feldspar. The water is brackish with salinity of only around 0.2%.

== Nature reserve ==
=== Islands ===
The Likskär nature reserve, the only one in the Kalix archipelago, was established in 1969. It includes 25 islands and smaller islets, and is part of the European Union's Natura 2000 network. The largest island, Getskär-Renskär, is the most visited. There are traces of old fishing villages, including simple dwellings and mounds for drying nets, and several mazes made of boulders on Likskär and Renskär. Fishermen's houses on Renskär and Likskär are now used as holiday homes.

Visitors may camp in designated areas and make fires using wood that they bring. Visitors may hike, pick berries and mushrooms and fish, but hunting and snowmobiling are prohibited. During the bird breeding season of May June and July boats must not come closer than 200 metres (660 ft) to the islands of Ligogrunnan, Splitterören, Olnisbrottet, Mellangrundsbotten and nearby islets.

=== Flora ===
The oldest islands have dense forest cover. Newer ones may have stands of juniper, meadows or bare gravel. Many of the beach plants of the Bothnian Bay are found in the nature reserve. These are hardy plants that can survive the scraping motion of the ice sheets that form in winter and advance as the ice expands, and can handle tides of brackish water that vary by up to 3 metres (9.8 ft). Away from the shore there are meadows with plants such as eyebright and valerian, then shrubs like buckthorn, willow and bog myrtle, and then a border of alder surrounding spruce forests.

=== Fauna ===
The varied vegetation supports a variety of birds and animals. Elk are often found on Renskär-Getskär, and resident mammals include fox, squirrel, ermine and plentiful hares. The Papilio machaon butterfly can sometimes be seen. Characteristic birds on Renskär-Getskär include pine grosbeaks, black grouse, rock ptarmigan and capercaillie. Likskär is relatively barren, but at Hedmarkerna there are willow ptarmigan, wheatears, Temminck's stints and turnstones. Herring gulls, terns, guillemots and ruddy turnstones nest on Likskärsrevet and Ligogrunnan, and there are spotted redshanks on the smaller islands.
