= Rånön =

Island in the country of Sweden

- Location within Norrbotten Location within Sweden

Geography
- Coordinates: 65.714°N 22.920°E
- Adjacent to: Bay of Bothnia
- Area: 23.47 km^{2} (9.06 sq mi)

Administration
- Sweden
- Province: Norrbotten
- Municipality: Kalix Municipality

Demographics
- Population: Uninhabited

Rånön is an island in the northwest of the Swedish sector of the Bay of Bothnia, in the Kalix archipelago.

== Location ==
Rånön is the largest island in the Kalix archipelago. It is uninhabited, but is popular with visitors in the summer. Rånö village is a former farming and fishing village at the north end of the island. The old meeting house can still be used, and the farm houses are now used as summer cottages. There is a large marina, and a coastal campground with cabins for rent.

There are 11 farm houses on the island. Most have been renovated and are used as summer homes. Old farm equipment and tanks can still be seen in the forest. Barns and former pasturage and hay fields are still visible in the north of the island. Small farm roads may still be used to walk or bicycle around the island.

== Terrain ==
The highest point is the hill of Bodöberget, about 45 metres (148 ft) high. The hill is covered with heather, moss and low pines, and gives a good view. Moose and grouse may be seen. The island has been considered as a site for wind power generation, as have Vargön and Baggen in Piteå and Stor-Brändön in Luleå. However a 2009 report concluded that construction could not be justified given the relatively small potential capacity, the cost and environmental damage.

== History ==
The fishing village dates to the 1600s. Later the resident population also started farming. In the early 1800s much of the original forest was cleared to meet the demands for fuel of the iron works in Töre and Strömsund. At its peak, the population was as many as eighty people, served by a shop and post office. The first school was established on the island in 1867 to meet the needs of a growing population. A prayer-house, called the Rånögården, was built in 1929 and 1930.

In 1939 the school had only eight students. It was closed that year and students had to go to school in Ryssbält.The island lost most of its population to the mainland in the mid-1950s. The tenant farmers sold their farms to the island's owner, SCA, and in the late 1960s the last residents moved to the mainland.
