= Kalix River =

River in Sweden

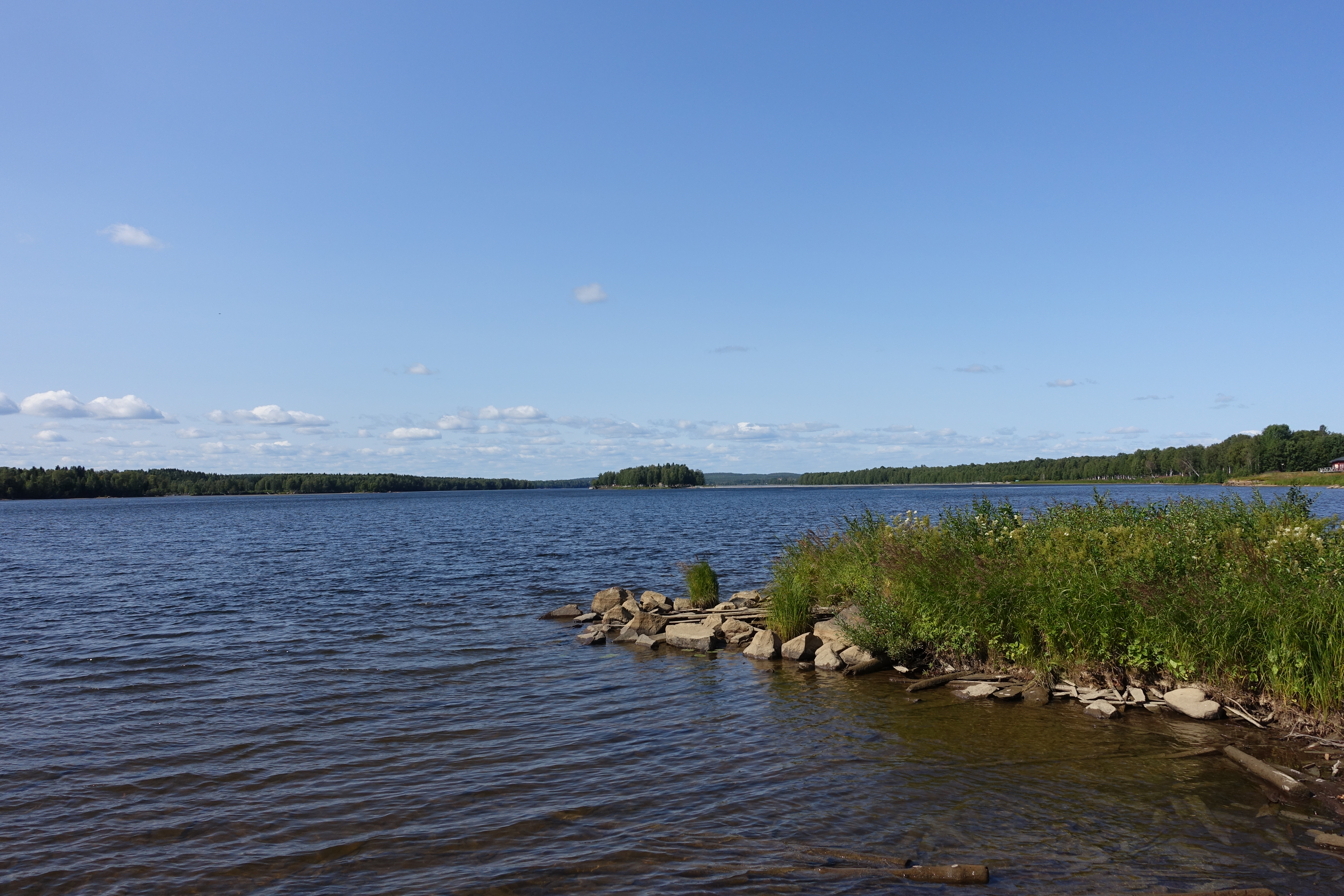
- Native name: kölisälva (Kalix); Kalix älv (Swedish)

Location
- Country: Sweden
- County: Norrbotten

Physical characteristics
- Mouth: Gulf of Bothnia
  - location: Kalix
  - coordinates: 65°50′N 23°11′E
  - elevation: 0 m (0 ft)
- Length: 450 km (280 mi)
- Basin size: 18,130.1 km^{2} (7,000.1 sq mi)
- Discharge
  - average: 290 m^{3}/s (10,000 cu ft/s)

The Kalix River (in Kalix dialect: kölisälva, Swedish: proper Kalix älv or in everyday language Kalixälven, Northern Sami: Gáláseatnu, In Meänkieli the lower part of the river is called Kaihnuunväylä, while the upper part is called Kaalasväylä) is one of the four major rivers of Norrland, northern Sweden, that are untouched by water power constructions. It is 461 kilometres long, flowing up to the Kebnekaise mountain range in Kiruna Municipality. In the southeast it flows through Lappland; and to the south through Norrbotten County, discharging in the Gulf of Bothnia south-east of Kalix.

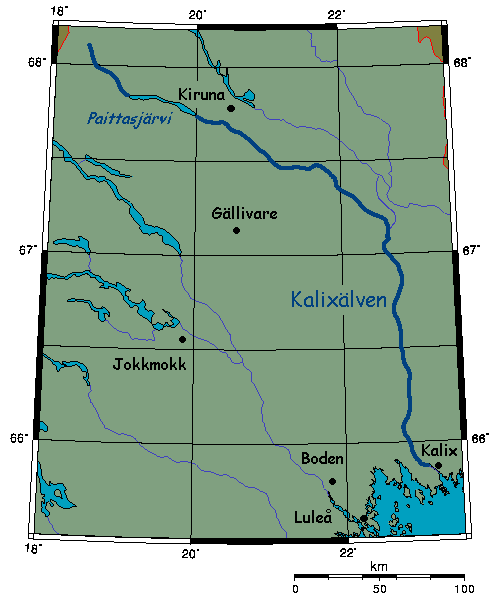
Map of the Kalix River

The Kalix River is the third river by length in Norrbotten, with the Torne River being 522 km and the Lule River being only slightly longer at 460.81 km

Major tributaries are Tvärån, Ängesån and Tärendö River, which is a bifurcation river taking water from Torne River.

Its largest waterfall is Jokkfall, in Överkalix Municipality, around 9 meters high. The river has no big waterfalls and no big lakes, and has therefore not been attractive for hydropower construction.
