= Kalix archipelago =

Archipelago in the country of Sweden

- Location within Sweden

Geography
- Coordinates: 65.656°N 23.053°E
- Adjacent to: Bay of Bothnia

Administration
- Sweden
- Province: Norrbotten

The Kalix archipelago (Swedish: Kalix skärgård) is a group of 792 Swedish islands in the north part of the Bay of Bothnia. The largest island in the Kalix archipelago is Rånön. A few of the islands have small permanent populations, but most are used only for recreation in the summer months. They are icebound during the winter.

== Location ==
The north of the bay of Bothnia contains a large archipelago area. The islands in the Swedish sector make up the Norrbotten archipelago. It is divided into the archipelagos of Piteå (550 islands), Luleå (1,312 islands), Kalix (792 islands) and Haparanda (652 islands). Due to post-glacial rebound the land is rising at from 0.8 to 1 centimetre (0.31 to 0.39 in) annually, so the shoreline can retreat by as much as 100 metres (330 ft) in one person's lifetime. As a result, the islands are growing in size but the waters and harbors are becoming shallower.

The largest island in the Kalix archipelago, and in the Norbotten archipelago as a whole, is Rånön. It is the only island in Kalix that once had a resident population, who lived from forestry, fishing and farming. Traces can still be seen. Stora Huvön is said to be one of the most beautiful islands in Sweden, with cliffs that rise from the sea, a sandy beach, and deep tree-filled valleys. Malören, in the outer archipelago, has a chapel that dates to the 1770s. Some of other islands include Bergön, Berghamn, Björn, Getskär-Renskär, Halsön, Granön, Likskär and Stora Trutskär.

== Climate ==
The archipelago is only 100 kilometres (62 mi) south of the Arctic Circle, so there is daylight for 24 hours in the summer, and full moon all day in the winter. The waters around the archipelago are brackish, with less the 10% of the salt content of the Atlantic. The sea freezes in January and remain frozen until March–April.

== Winter tourism ==
Winter tourism in the Kalix area includes icebreaker excursions on the frozen Bay of Bothnia. The tourist icebreaker Polar Explorer operates from Axelsvik near Kalix, where it was introduced for tourist cruises in 2016.

Local tourism information lists icebreaker cruises among winter activities in Kalix. The operator lists the Polar Explorer cruise terminal at Axelsviksvägen in Båtskärsnäs and states that the vessel operates on the frozen waters of the Bothnian Bay.

== See also ==
- List of islands of the Kalix archipelago
