= List of islands of the Piteå archipelago =

This list of islands of the Piteå archipelago includes the many islands, large and small, in the Swedish Piteå archipelago in the north of the Bothnian Bay. They are part of the larger archipelago that encompasses islands around the northern end of the bay.

Islands in Piteå Municipality include:

- Baggen
- Baljan
- Bergön
- Bergskäret
- Bergvättingen
- Berkön
- Bondökallarna
- Bondökallrevet
- Bondön
- Bursfjärdgrundet
- Degerbergsgrundet
- Djupgrunden
- Döman
- Fårön, Piteå
- Fårön, Trundön
- Fjärdvättingen
- Fjuksören
- Fjuksörrevet
- Flottgrunden
- Fördärvet
- Furuholmen
- Görjeskäret
- Gråsjähällan
- Gråsjälen
- Gråsjälgrundet
- Grundkallen
- Grytan
- Guldsmeden
- Hällen
- Hällskäret
- Hällskärsgrundet
- Halsören
- Hamngrunden
- Hamnholmen
- Hamnviksgrundet
- Hans-Persagrundet
- Haraholmsrevet
- Huvan
- Innersten Bondökallen
- Innerstholmen-Bastaholmen
- Inre Mjoögrunden
- Inre Mörögrundet
- Jävre Sandön
- Jävreholmen
- Klacken
- Klemmeten
- Klemmetgrundet
- Klingergrundet
- Klingergrundsrevet
- Klinten
- Kluntarna
- Kluntbrotten
- Krokamargit
- Lakakallarna
- Långörarna
- Lappskatagrundet
- Lavholmen
- Lellrevet
- Lill Björn
- Lill Rönnskär
- Lillhörun
- Lill-Leskäret
- Lill-Räbben
- Lill-Renörarna
- Lillrevet
- Lill-Sandögrundet
- Lill-Sandskäret
- Lill-Svinören
- Lönngrundet
- Lövgrundet
- Malen
- Malkallen
- Medgrundet
- Medgrundsrevet
- Mellerstön
- Mitten Bondökallen
- Mjoön
- Mörgrundet
- Mosesholmen
- Näsgrundet
- Nörd-Fårön
- Nörd-Haraholmen
- Nörd-Mörön
- Norra revet
- Nötögrundet
- Nötön
- Ol-Svensakallen
- Ol-Svensastenarna
- Orrskäret
- Orrskärsgrundet
- Orrskärsrevet
- Örsgrönnan
- Patta Peken
- Peken
- Pitholmen
- Pultvikhällan
- Rävagrundet
- Renön
- Renskärsrevet
- Ringelrevet
- Sandöklubben
- Sandön
- Sandskärsgrundet
- Sandskärshörn
- Skabbgrundet
- Skottgrundet
- Sladagrunden
- Smågrunden
- Söran
- Sör-Fårön
- Sör-Haraholmen
- Spaningsören
- Stenskäret
- Stor Dödmannen
- Storfjärdsgrunden
- Storgrundet
- Storhörun
- Stor-Leskäret
- Stor-Räbben
- Stor-Renörarna
- Storrevet
- Stor-Sandskäret
- Storstenen
- Storstenrevet
- Stor-Svinören
- Tallskäret
- Timmermannen
- Trundön
- Trutgrundet, Bergön
- Trutgrundet, Bondön
- Tvarun
- Vargön
- Västra revet
- Vidvästern
- Vorrskärsgrundet
- Yttersten Bondökallen
- Ytterstholmen
- Yttre Degerstensgrundet
- Yttre Mjoögrunden
- Yttre Mörögrundet
- Yxvättingen

== See also ==
- List of islands of Bothnian Bay
