= List of islands of Bothnian Bay =

Location of Bothnian Bay in Scandinavia

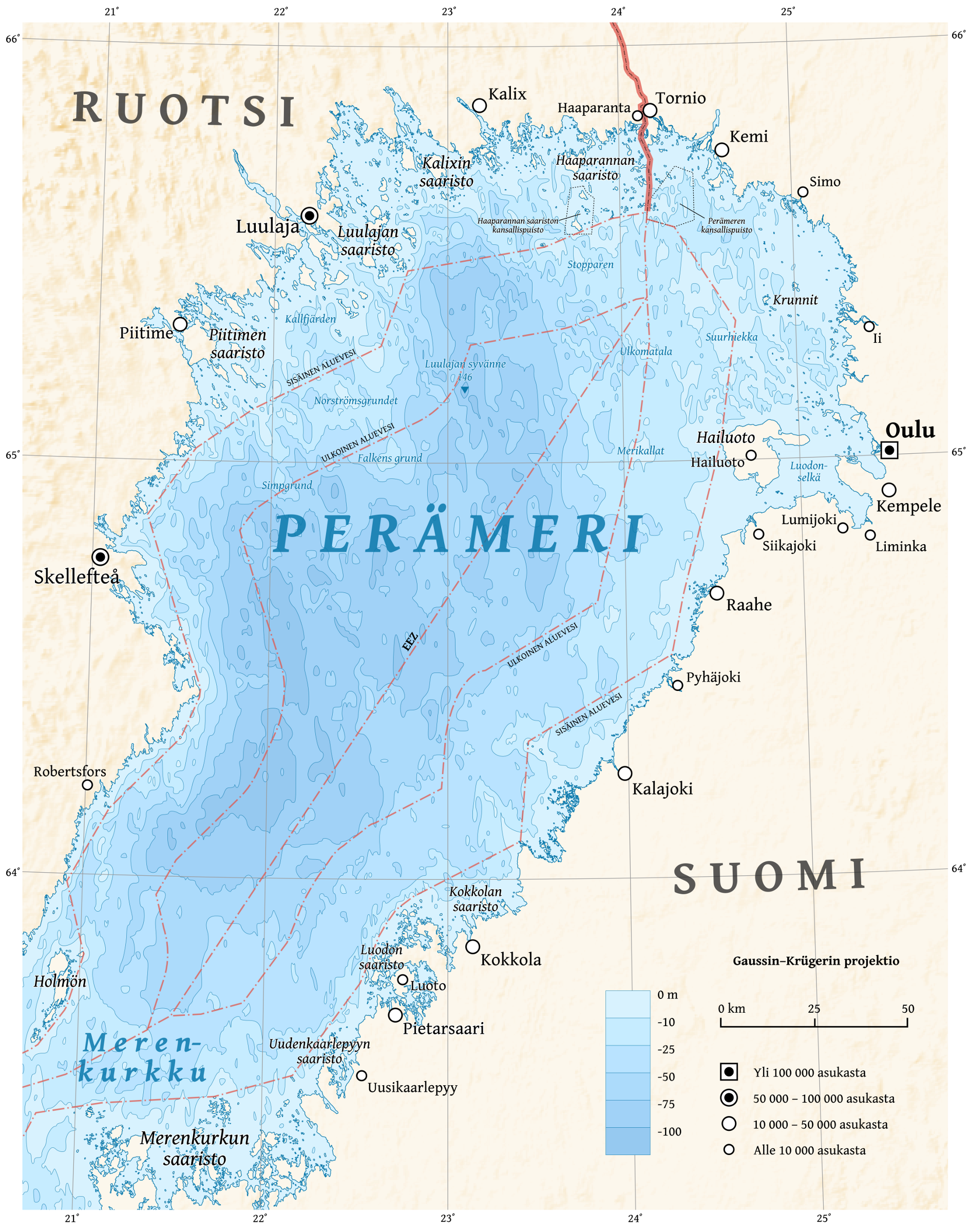
Basic map of Bothnian Bay

A list of islands of Bothnian Bay would include 4,001 islands if an island is defined as an area of land more than 20 square metres (220 sq ft) that is surrounded by water.

Bothnian Bay (Swedish: Bottenviken, Finnish: Perämeri) is divided between northern Sweden and Finland. The north of the bay contains a large archipelago area. The largest island is Hailuoto, further south on the Finnish side. In the winter the larger islands may be accessed via ice roads. Some of them are inhabited or have seasonal fishing villages used by people from the mainland.

== Swedish islands ==
The Swedish islands in the north of the bay may be grouped into the Piteå, Luleå, Kalix and Haparanda archipelagos. Many of the islands are uninhabited and in a natural state. There are other islands along the Swedish coast to the south of the archipelago area.

=== Piteå ===
Some of the larger islands in the Piteå archipelago include:

- Baggen
- Bergön
- Buskön
- Fårön
- Jävre Sandön
- Jävreholmen
- Lill-Räbben
- Mellerstön
- Nörd-Mörön
- Piteå-Rönnskär
- Stenskäret
- Stor-Räbben
- Vargön

=== Luleå ===
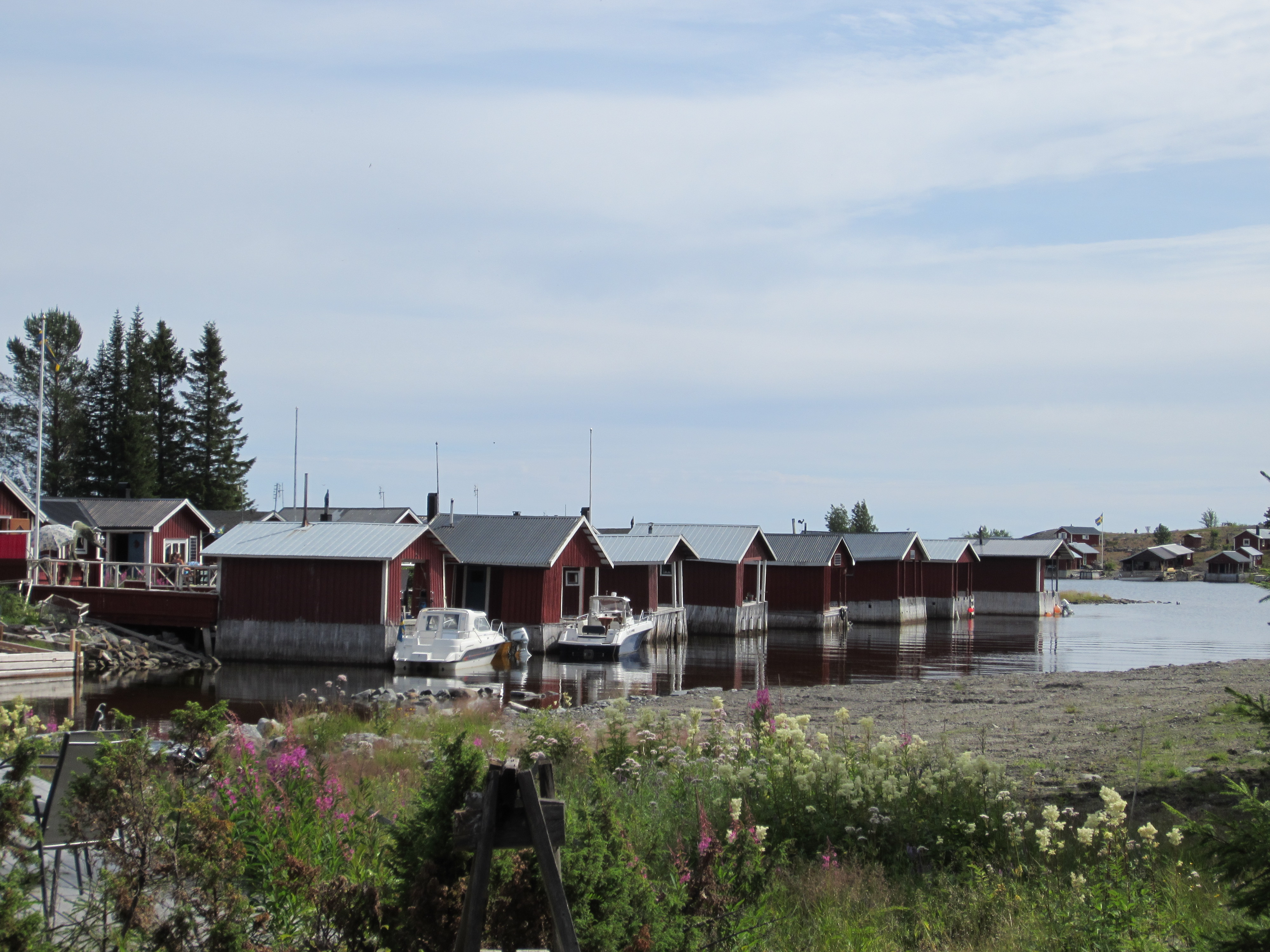
Old fishing huts at Brändöskär

Some of the larger islands in the Luleå archipelago include:

- Altappen
- Bastaskär
- Brändöskär
- Estersön
- Finnskär
- Germanön
- Hertsöland
- Hindersön
- Junkön
- Kallaxön
- Kluntarna
- Likskär
- Långön
- Rödkallen
- Rörbäck Sandöskatan
- Sandgrönnorna
- Sandön
- Smålsön
- Småskär
- Stor-Brändön
- Uddskär

=== Kalix ===
Some of the larger islands in the Kalix archipelago include:

- Bergön
- Berghamn
- Björn
- Getskär-Renskär
- Granön
- Halsön
- Likskär
- Malören
- Rånön
- Stora Huvön
- Stora Trutskär

=== Haparanda ===
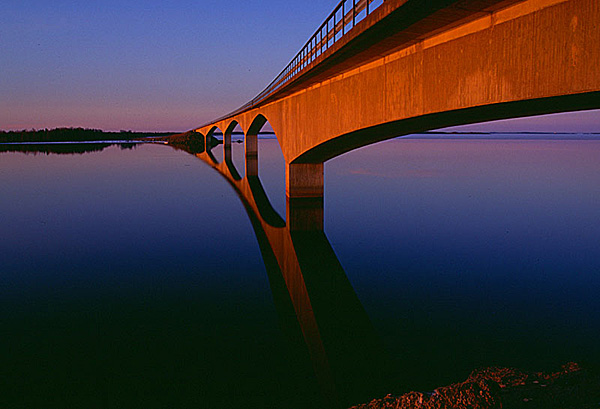
The bridge to Seskaro

The Swedish Haparanda Archipelago National Park (Swedish: Haparanda skärgårds nationalpark) lies within the Haparanda group of islands, bordering the Finnish Bothnian Bay National Park. It includes the larger islands of Sandskär and Seskar Furö, and some smaller islands and skerries. All of these islands have emerged in the last 1,500 years as the bed of the bay has risen. Some of the larger islands in Haparanda archipelago include:

- Hanhinkari
- Kataja
- Sandskär
- Seskar-Furö
- Seskarö
- Skomakaren
- Stora Hamnskär
- Stora Hepokari
- Torne-Furö

=== Other Swedish islands ===
- Bredskär
- Halsön
- Högskäret
- Malören
- Romelsön
- Selsvik
- Skötgrönnan

== Finnish islands ==
In the portion of the bay that belongs to Finland the majority of islands lie in the section between Tornio on the Swedish border and the large island of Hailuoto offshore from Oulu, although there are many small islands along the coast to the south. The Bothnian Bay National Park in the Finnish section (Finnish: Perämeren kansallispuisto, Swedish: Bottenvikens nationalpark), established in 1991, is located in the archipelago offshore from Tornio and Kemi. It covers 157 square kilometres (61 sq mi) of which about 2.5 square kilometres (0.97 sq mi) is land.

=== Tornio municipality ===
Islands in the Tornio municipality beside the Swedish municipality of Haparanda include:

- Inakari
- Iso-Huituri (Tornio and Kemi)
- Kuusiluoto
- Pajukari
- Pensaskari
- Röyttä

=== Kemi municipality ===
Islands in the Kemi municipality to the east of Tornio, at the mouth of river Kemijoki, include:

- Ajos
- Inakari
- Keilakrunni
- Kemin Kiikkara
- Keminkraaseli
- Pohjois-Kraaseli
- Rautakallio
- Selkä-Sarvi
- Täikkö
- Täikönkari

=== Simo municipality ===
Islands in the Simo municipality at the mouth of river Simojoki include:

- Halttari
- Härkäletto
- Laitakari
- Leipäreet
- Lissabon
- Montaja
- Möyly
- Ööperit
- Paskaletto
- Pirttisaari
- Rajaletto
- Saapaskari
- Tiuranen
- Tiurasenkalla
- Tiurasenkrunni
- Tynttyrit
- Ykskivi

=== Ii municipality ===
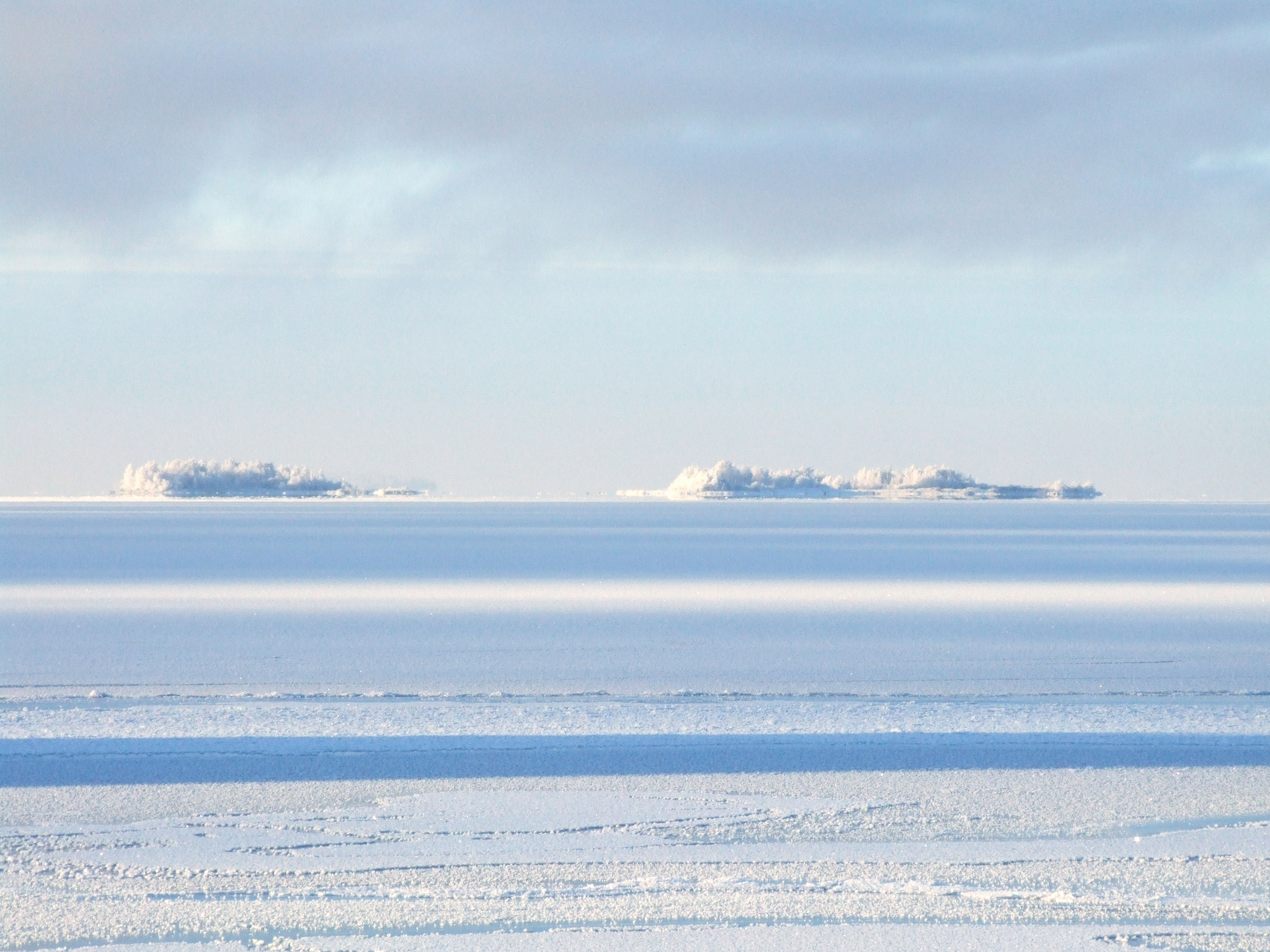
The Hermanni islands. A wintery view of a group of small islands in the Bothnian Bay near Oulu, Finland

Islands in the Ii municipality at the mouth of river Iijoki include:

- Hietakalla, Vatunki
- Hietakalla, Hiastinlahti
- Hylkikalla
- Iin Röyttä
- Illinsaari
- Karhu
- Koni
- Krassinletto
- Kriisi
- Krunnien saaristo
- Kuivamatala
- Kutinkalla
- Onsajanmatala
- Pallonen
- Pensaskari
- Ryöskärinkalla
- Santapankki
- Satakari
- Selkäletto
- Tangonsaari
- Ulko-Klaama
- Ulko-Pallonen
- Ulkokrunni

=== Haukipudas municipality ===
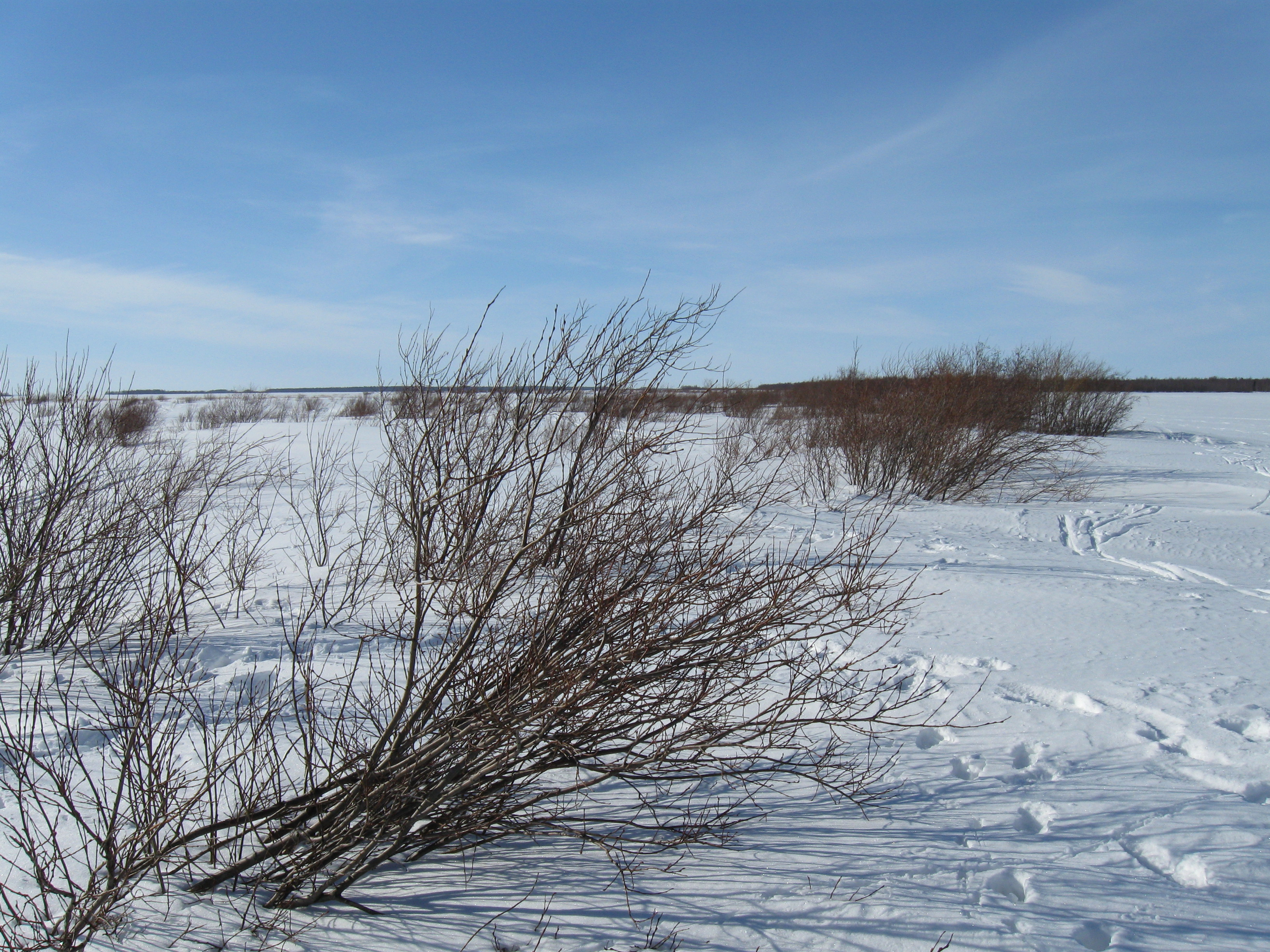
Kellon Kraaseli in the winter

Islands in the former Haukipudas municipality include:

- Äijänkumpele
- Astekari
- Hanhikari
- Hietakari
- Hiuvet
- Hopreeni
- Iso-Miehikkä
- Isonkivenletto
- Kaasamatala,
- Kattilankalla
- Kellon Kraaseli
- Kintasletto
- Kotakari
- Kriisinkivi
- Kropsu
- Laitakari
- Lemmonletto
- Luodeletto
- Länsiletto
- Lönkytin
- Mustakari, Virpiniemi
- Mustakari, Martinniemi
- Nimetön
- Pensaskari
- Pulkkisenmatala (Haukipudas/Oulu)
- Puukkoletto
- Rapakari
- Rivinletto
- Satakarinletto
- Välikari
- Väliletto
- Ykskivi

=== Oulu municipality ===
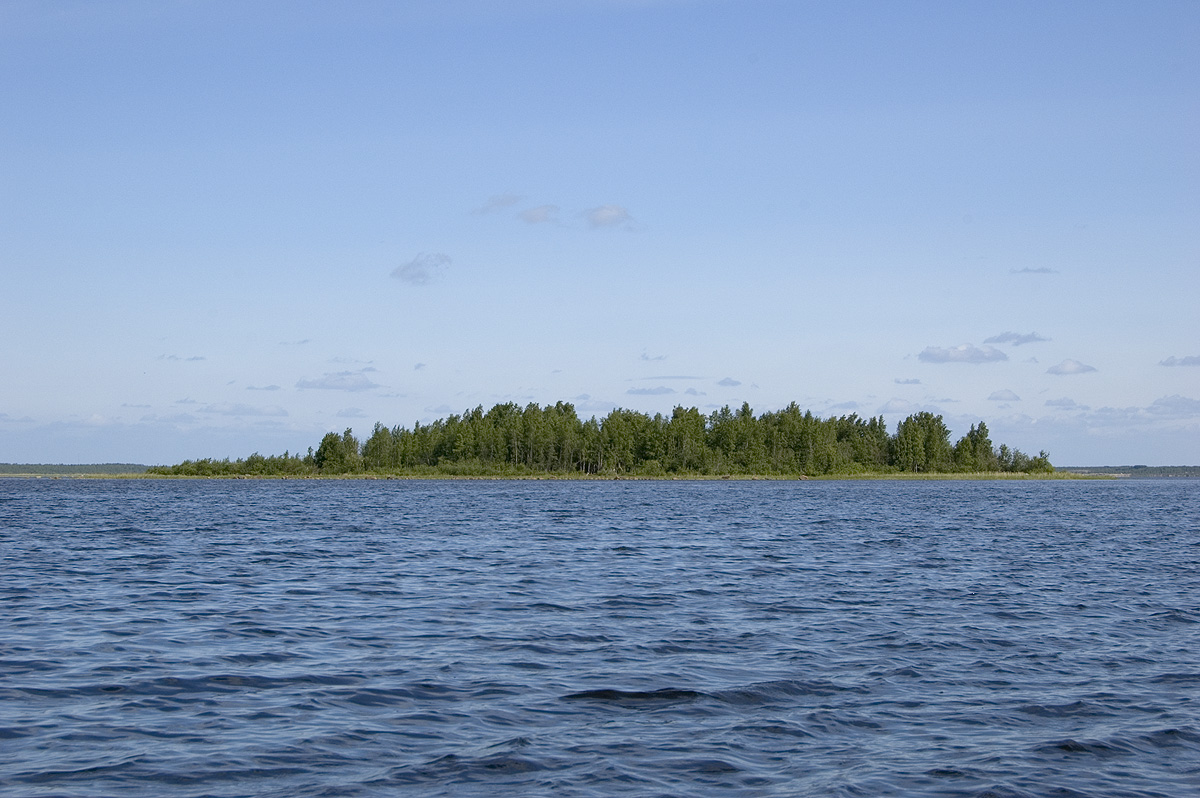
Kahvankari from the south

Islands in the Oulu municipality include:

- Hermannit
- Hietasaari
- Kahvankari
- Korkiakari
- Laitakari
- Riitankari
- Runniletto
- Saapaskari
- Selkäkari
- Toppilansaari
- Vihreäsaari

=== Other Finnish islands ===
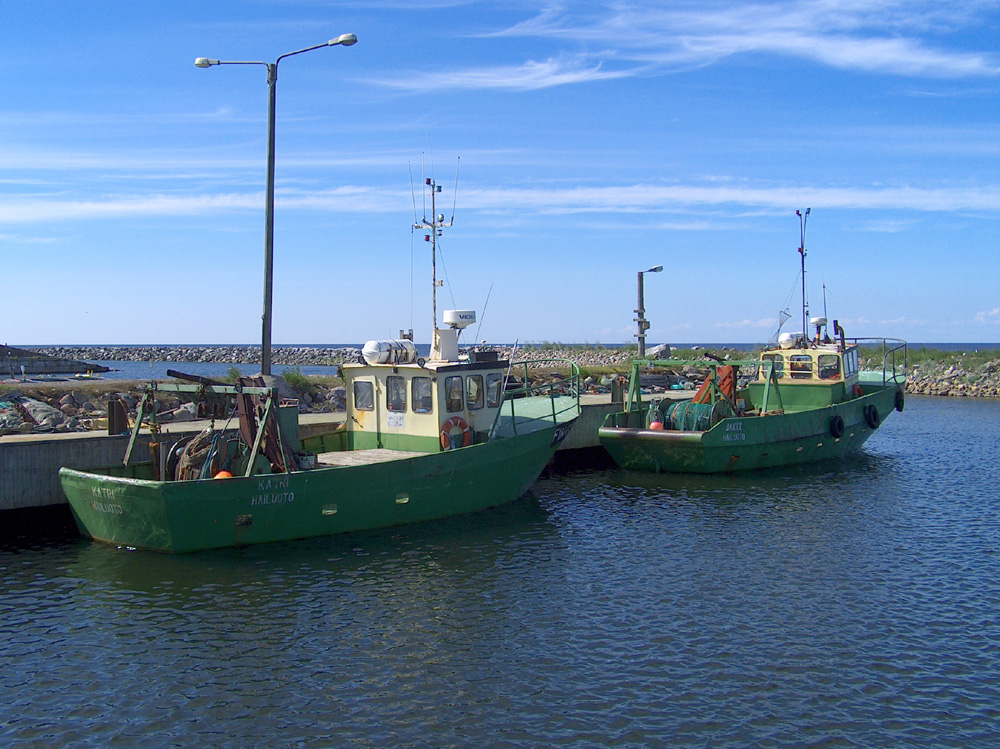
Boats in Marjaniemi on Hailuoto

Other islands in the Finnish part of the bay include.

- Akio, Oulunsalo
- Haahka
- Hailuoto, Hailuoto
- Iso-Kraaseli, Raahe
- Kallankarit, Kalajoki
- Kammonkari, Oulunsalo
- Karinkannanmatala, Siikajoki
- Kello, Raahe
- Kengänkari, Hailuoto
- Kolmenkoivunkari, Oulunsalo
- Kotakari, Oulunsalo
- Kraaseli, Oulunsalo
- Kraaselinpauha, Lohtaja
- Kumpele, Raahe
- Lamunkari, Lumijoki
- Maluri, Haaparanta
- Ohtakari,
- Parmiinit, Oulunsalo
- Puluvärkki, Raahe
- Rautakallio, Siikajoki
- Rokonkari, Lumijoki
- Sanskeri, Haaparanta
- Santosenkari, Hailuoto
- Seittenkaari, Haaparanta
- Tasku, Raahe
- Ulkolaidanmatala, Hailuoto
- Ulkopauha, Raahe
- Varjakansaari, Oulunsalo
