= List of islands of the Luleå archipelago =

This list of islands of the Luleå archipelago includes the many islands, large and small, in the Swedish Luleå archipelago in the north of the Bothnian Bay. They are part of the larger archipelago that encompasses islands around the northern end of the bay.

Islands in Luleå Municipality include:

- Abborvikgrundet
- Äggrundet
- Ågrundet
- Alskäret
- Antnäs-Börstskäret
- Avasjögrundet
- Bådan
- Bastaskäret
- Båtö-Fröskan
- Båtöharun
- Båtöklubben
- Båtön, Luleå
- Bergön, Luleå
- Biskopsgrundet
- Biskopsholmen
- Bjässhällan
- Björkön, Luleå
- Björkören
- Björkskäret, Kluntarna
- Blockören
- Bockhällan
- Bockön, Luleå
- Bockstensrevet
- Bodgrundet
- Bodören
- Borgen, Luleå
- Börstskärbådan
- Brändavagrundet
- Brändöhamnsrevet
- Brändön (island)
- Brändören
- Brändöskär
- Brännholmsören
- Buketten
- Bullran
- Degerö-Börstskär
- Degerön, Luleå
- Enagrundet, Luleå
- Eriksgrundet
- Estersön
- Fågelreven
- Fårön, Luleå
- Finnskäret
- Fjärdsgrundet, Luleå
- Fjuksögrundet
- Fjuksökallarna
- Fjuksön
- Flakaskäret
- Fliggen
- Franska stenarna
- Furuholmen, Bockön
- Furuholmen, Råne
- Furuholmen, Sandön
- Germandöhällan
- Germandön
- Germandösten
- Grangrundet
- Granholmen, Råne
- Granön
- Granön-Äggskär
- Granskäret, Luleå
- Gråsjälgrundet, Luleå
- Gråsjälreven
- Gräsögrundet
- Grillklippan, Båtön
- Grillklippan, Rödkallen
- Grisselklippan
- Grönnan
- Gubben
- Hällgrundet, Brändöskär
- Hällgrundet, Luleå
- Hällhamnsgrynnan
- Hällhamnsklippan
- Hällholmen, Luleå
- Hällklimpen
- Halsön, Luleå
- Hamnögrundet
- Hamnön
- Hamnöörarna
- Hansgrundet
- Hästgrunden
- Hästgrundreven
- Hindersö-Fröskan
- Hindersön
- Höghällan
- Hovlössgrönnan
- Husön
- Husören, Tistersöarna
- Husören, Båtön
- Innersthällen / Bredhällen
- Inre grundet
- Junköklippan
- Junkön
- Kalixgrundet
- Kälkholmen
- Kallax Svarten
- Kallaxön
- Kallen
- Kasthällan
- Kastören, Luleå
- Kåtaholmen
- Kåtaholmgrundet
- Kilsgrundet
- Kindskatarevet
- Klasgrönnan
- Klemensskäret
- Klingergrundet, Luleå
- Kluntarna, Luleå
- Klyvan
- Klyvgrunden
- Knivören
- Köpmanholmen, Lule Archipel
- Kortspelagrundet
- Kråkrevet, Småskär
- Kråkrevet, Brändöskär
- Krångetören
- Krokabuskgrundet
- Kunoön
- Kunoönhällan
- Kvarnhällorna
- Lågören
- Långholmen, Luleå
- Långön
- Långörgrundet
- Långrevet
- Laxögrundet
- Laxön
- Laxövattungen
- Lekrevet
- Likskäret, Luleå
- Lill Båtöklippan
- Lill Bullerskäret
- Lill Henriksgrundet
- Lill Hindersöharun
- L, vervolg
- Lill Långören
- Lill Sikören
- Lill Svartgrundet
- Lill-Bergögrundet
- Lill-Furuholmen
- Lill-Furön
- Lill-Hamnskäret
- Lill-Hundskäret
- Lill-Kilholmen
- Lill-Kunoögrund
- Lill-Mannöhällan
- Lill-Renholmsgrundet
- Lill-Risöholmen
- Lill-Skränmåsören
- Lillbjörnen
- Lillhällan
- Lillskorvgrundet
- Linneagrundet
- Lönngrundet, Luleå
- Lossen (island)
- Lövgrundet, Lule
- Lövören
- Luleå
- Lulhällan
- Mannön
- Mannöskäret
- Mannövattungen
- Månshällorna
- Megrönnan
- Mjoön, Luleå
- Mörön (island)
- Mössan
- Mulön
- Musgrundet
- Nagelskäret
- Nätigrundet, Luleå
- Nördskatagrundet
- Norr-Äspen
- Norr-Tistersön
- Norrbrottet
- Notvikgrunden
- Nygrönnhällan
- Nygrönnrevet
- Örgrundet
- Orrskäret, Hindersön
- Östigrundet
- Östregrundet
- Östreklacken
- Oxgrundet
- Piltreven
- Rafflan
- Råne-archipel
- Renholmen
- Renholmsgrönnan
- Risögrundet
- Risön, Luleå
- Rödbergsgrunden
- Rödbergsklippan
- Rödkallen
- Rönnören, Luleå
- Rövaren
- Sandgrönnan
- Sandgrönnorna
- Sandnäshällan
- Sandöbådan
- Sandögrundet
- Sandön, Luleå
- Sandskär, Luleå
- Sandskärhällan
- Sandviksreven
- Sigfridsön
- Sikhällan
- Sikören
- Sikörgrunden
- Sikörgrundet
- Sikrevet
- Skagerören
- Skärgrundet
- Skärgrundsflagan
- Skepparskäret
- Skinnaren
- Skogsskäret
- Skorven
- Skutgrundet
- Sladagrundet
- Smålsön
- Småskär
- Smulterskäret
- Sör-Äspen
- Sör-Rengrundet
- Sör-Tistersön
- Sörbrottet
- Sörön
- Spålgrundet
- Stångholmen
- Stångholmgrundet
- Stensborg
- Stor Båtönklippan
- Stor Bullerskäret
- Stor Hindersöharun
- Stor Långören
- Stor Svartgrundet
- Stor-Bergögrundet
- Stor-Furuholmen
- Stor-Furuön
- Stor-Hamnskäret
- Stor-Hundskäret
- Stor-Kallgröten
- Stor-Kilholmen
- Stor-Kunoögrund
- Stor-Lönngrundet
- Stor-Mannöhällan
- Stor-Renholmsgrundet
- Stor-Risöholmen
- Stor-Skränmåsören
- Storbrändön
- Storgrönnan
- Storgrundet, Degerö
- Storgrundet, Hindersön
- Storgrundet, Rödkallen
- Storgrundet, Tistersöarna
- Storhällan
- Storrevet, Luleå
- Storsandrevet
- Storstengrundet, Luleå
- Strapögrönnan
- Strapön
- Strömmingsören
- Strömören
- Styrmärkesgrundet
- Svartgrundet, Luleå
- Svartön, Luleå
- Svartören
- Svartörsrevet
- Tärngrundet
- Tjuvholmen
- Tomgrundet
- Troppen, Luleå
- Troppen, Råneå
- Trutören, Hindersön
- Trutören, Sandön
- Trutörgrönnan
- Tvegränaören
- Utlöktesgrundet
- Vallören
- Västangrunden
- Västifjärdgrundet
- Vättarna
- Vattungen, Luleå
- Vitfågelskäret
- Ytterstgrundet
- Yttersthällan
- Ytterstholmen, Luleå
- Yttre Sandgrundet, Luleå
- Yxören

== See also ==
- List of islands of Bothnian Bay
