= List of islands of Sweden =

This is a list of islands of Sweden. A 2013 statistics report concluded that there are 267,570 islands in Sweden, though fewer than 1,000 of these are inhabited. The total area of the islands is 1.2 million hectares, which corresponds to 3% percent of the total land area of Sweden. Most of the islands are in the Baltic Sea regions of the Bay of Bothnia and the Bothnian Sea.

Rough population statistics are from 2015.

== Ordered by size ==
Island	Area (km^{2})	Area (sq mi)	Population
Gotland	2,994	1,156	61,023
Öland	1,342	518	25,846
Orust	346	134	15,000
Hisingen	199	77	176,047
Värmdö	181	70	48,000
Tjörn	148	57	15,000
Väddö and Björkö	128	49	1,700
Fårö	113	44	500
Selaön	95	37	1,800
Gräsö	93	36	800
Svartsjölandet	82	32	8,700
Hertsön	73	28	22,000
Alnön	68	26	8,298
Ekerö and Munsö	68	26	11,524
Tosterön-Aspön	66	25	3,600
Ingarö	63	24	6,900
Ljusterö	62	24	1,500
Torsö	62	24	520
Ammerön	60	23	100
Kållandsö	57	22	1,100

== Other well-known islands ==
- Adelsö
- Björkö (Birka)
- Bondaholmen
- Frösön
- Gåsö
- Gotska Sandön
- Helgö
- Holmöarna
- Koster Islands
- Lidingö
- Märket
- Mjältön
- Stora Karlsö
- Ven
- Visingsö
- Furusund

== See also ==
- List of islands of Bothnian Bay
- List of islands of Stockholm
- List of lighthouses and lightvessels in Sweden
- List of islands in the Baltic Sea
- List of islands
