= Vargon =

Vargon may refer to:

- Vargön, a locality situated in Vänersborg Municipality, Västra Götaland County, Sweden
- Vargön, Piteå, an island in the northwest of the Swedish sector of the Bay of Bothnia, in the Piteå archipelago
