= Brändön =

- Location within Norrbotten Location within Sweden
- Coordinates: 65°42′N 22°20′E
- Country: Sweden
- Province: Norrbotten
- County: Norrbotten County
- Municipality: Luleå Municipality

Area
  - Total: 0.58 km^{2} (0.22 sq mi)

Population (31 December 2010)
  - Total: 287
  - Density: 497/km^{2} (1,290/sq mi)
- Time zone: UTC+1 (CET)
  - Summer (DST): UTC+2 (CEST)

Brändön is a locality situated in Luleå Municipality, Norrbotten County, Sweden with 287 inhabitants in 2010. It gives its name to the island and fishing village of Brändöskär in the outer Luleå archipelago, which the people of Brändön used as a base for fishing in the summer.
