= Likskär =

Likskär may refer to:

- Likskär, Kalix, an island and nature reserve in the Kalix Archipelago of Sweden
- Likskär, Luleå, an island in the Luleå archipelago of Sweden, joined to the island of Altappen
