= Krokamargit =

Island in the Piteå archipelago, Sweden

Coordinates: 65°20′04″N 21°35′26″E

Krokamargit is a Swedish island in the Piteå archipelago. The island is located in a bay (Margitviken) between Nötön and Renön, where both islands have not yet permanently grown together further south. Krokamargit has no shore connection and there are some summer houses on it.

There is a well known tale about the name of the island. In the 1800s the Russians invaded Northern Sweden and took gold from the residents of Piteå. The tale says that an old lady was responsible for keeping the residents' gold and treasures after they heard that the Russians were coming back. However, when the Russians left and the residents went to collect their treasures, she was dead due to natural causes. No one has found it since then.
