= Klingergrundsrevet =

Island in the Piteå archipelago, Sweden

Coordinates: 65°14′57″N 21°44′12″E

Klingergrundsrevet is a Swedish island belonging to the Piteå archipelago. The island forms the middle part of the Vargödrag Nature Reserve. In addition, it is a protected area for birds, which means that between 1 May and 31 July the island may not be approached. To the northeast of this island lies the small island Klingergrundet.
