= Fjärdvättingen =

Island in the Piteå archipelago, Sweden

Coordinates: 65°06′28″N 21°34′14″E

Fjärdvättingen is a Swedish island belonging to the Piteå archipelago. The island is located off the coast of Jävrebodarna. The island has no shore connection but it has a number of summer houses.
