= Inre Mjoögrunden =

Area in the Piteå archipelago, Sweden

Inre Mjoögrunden consists of 10 Swedish islands belonging to the Piteå archipelago. The small archipelago lies north of Mjoön. The islands do not have a connection to the mainland. There are small houses on the biggest island.

== Geography ==
Inre Mjoögrunden comprises ten small islands surrounding a larger island. The largest island is seasonally inhabited and features several small cottages . The islands are characterized by their natural beauty, with dense coniferous forests and rocky shores .

== Flora and Fauna ==
Due to their location in northern Sweden, Inre Mjoögrunden hosts a unique ecosystem. The islands provide a habitat for numerous bird species, including terns and gulls, as well as mammals such as foxes and hares . The flora includes typical northern coniferous forests and a variety of heathland plants .

== History ==
Historically, the islands have been used as a summer retreat by residents of the Norrbotten region. This tradition continues today, with many of the small cottages on the largest island used as summer homes .

== Tourism ==
Inre Mjoögrunden attracts tourists seeking peaceful nature experiences due to its isolation and pristine environment . Popular activities include water sports such as kayaking, as well as fishing and hiking . The absence of a permanent connection to the mainland requires visitors to access the islands by boat .
