= Hamnviksgrundet =

Island in the Piteå archipelago, Sweden

Coordinates: 65°10′22″N 21°34′43″E

Hamnviksgrundet is a Swedish island belonging to the Piteå archipelago. The sandy island is located off the coast of the small bay of Hamnviken, for which it is named. It has no shore connection and is uninhabited/unbuilt.
