= Malkallen =

Island in the Piteå archipelago, Sweden

Coordinates: 65°17′N 21°52′E

Malkallen is a Swedish island belonging to the Piteå archipelago. The island is located to the southwest of Malen. It has no shore connection and is uninhabited / unbuilt.
