= Örsgrönnan =

Island in the Piteå archipelago, Sweden

Örsgrönnan is a Swedish island belonging to the Piteå archipelago. The island is located south of Trundön. The island has no shore connection and there are no summer houses on it. The island is a bird protection area, and during the breeding season it is not allowed to enter or approach the island.
