= Stor-Svinören =

Island in the Piteå archipelago, Sweden

Coordinates: 65°19′46″N 21°39′38″E

Stor-Svinören is a Swedish island belonging to the Piteå archipelago. The island is located off the coast of Nörd-Haraholmen. Lill-Svinören is located west of Stor-Svinören. The island has no shore connection and there are some summer houses on it.
