= Stor-Sandskäret =

Stor-Sandskäret is a Swedish shoal belonging to the Piteå archipelago. Together with Sandskärsgrundet, the island is part of the Bondöfjärd Reserve.

In the south, the island Sandskärshörun is attached to the island.
