= Kluntarna =

Coordinates: 65.276°N 21.940°E

Kluntarna or Pite-Kluntarna is a Swedish island belonging to the Piteå archipelago in Norrbotten. The island lies on the eastern edge of the archipelago; to the east lies the Gulf of Bothnia. The island has no bridge to the mainland. It has a few buildings but no permanent residents. Kluntarna was part of the Patta Peken Nature Reserve, since 2018 included in the larger Kallfjärden Nature Reserve.
