= Luleå archipelago =

Archipelago in the country of Sweden

- Location within Sweden

Geography
- Coordinates: 65.487335°N 22.435241°E
- Adjacent to: Bay of Bothnia

Administration
- Sweden
- Province: Norrbotten
- Municipality: Luleå

The Luleå archipelago (Swedish: Luleå skärgård or Lule skärgård) is a group of Swedish islands in the north part of the Bay of Bothnia. They lie offshore from the city of Luleå and the mouth of the Lule River. A few of the islands have small permanent populations, but most are used only for recreation in the summer months. They are icebound during the winter.

== Location ==
The north of the bay of Bothnia contains a large archipelago area. The islands in the Swedish sector make up the Norrbotten archipelago. They are divided into the Piteå, Luleå, Kalix and Haparanda archipelagos. The Luleå archipelago lies in the Luleå Municipality, part of the Norrbotten county. The port of Luleå is one of the largest in Sweden in terms of tonnage, shipping iron ore and steel.

There are more than 1,312 islands in the Luleå archipelago if small or very small rocky islets are included. (Note: Other sources give counts that range from 750 to 1,700 islands, presumably depending on size.) Many of the islands are uninhabited, in a natural state, and are quite small with little or nothing in the way of facilities for visitors. Due to post-glacial rebound the land is rising at from 0.8 to 1 centimetre (0.31 to 0.39 in) annually, so the shoreline can retreat by as much as 100 metres (330 ft) in one person's lifetime. As a result, the islands are growing in size but the waters and harbors are becoming shallower. Because of this process in 1649 the entire city of Luleå was forced to move to its present location since the channel to its previous location had become too shallow.

The islands are unofficially divided into three zones for administrative purposes. The inner zone holds the islands of Brändön, Hertsölandet, Laxön, Likskäret, Rörbäck-Sandöskatan and Sandön. The middle zone holds the islands of Altappen, Bockön, Degerön, Fjuksön, Germandön, Hamnön, Hindersön, Junkön, Kallaxön, Lappön, Långön, Mannön, Nagelskäret, Sandskäret, Sigfridsön, Storbrändön, Stor-Furuön and Tistersöarna. The outer zone contains Bastaskäret, Brändöskäret, Båtön, Estersön, Finnskäret, Kluntarna, Mjoön, Norr-Espen, Rödkallen, Sandgrönnorna, Saxskäret, Smålsön, Småskär and Sör-Espen.

== Climate ==
The archipelago is only 100 kilometres (62 mi) south of the Arctic Circle, so there is daylight for 24 hours in the summer, and full moon all day in the winter. In the summer many of the islands can be reached by tour boat. In the winter they can be reached by ice road, snowmobile, skiing or skating.

The waters around the archipelago are brackish, with less than 10% of the salt content of the Atlantic. The sea freezes in January and remain frozen until March–April. Ice roads are cleared to four inhabited islands. In total there are 60 kilometres (37 mi) of ice roads. The longest ice road in Sweden at 15 kilometres (9.3 mi) runs from Hindersöstallarna on the mainland to the islands of Hindersön, Stor-Brändön, and Långön. Normally the road is open from January to April. Vehicle weight restrictions apply.

== Environment ==
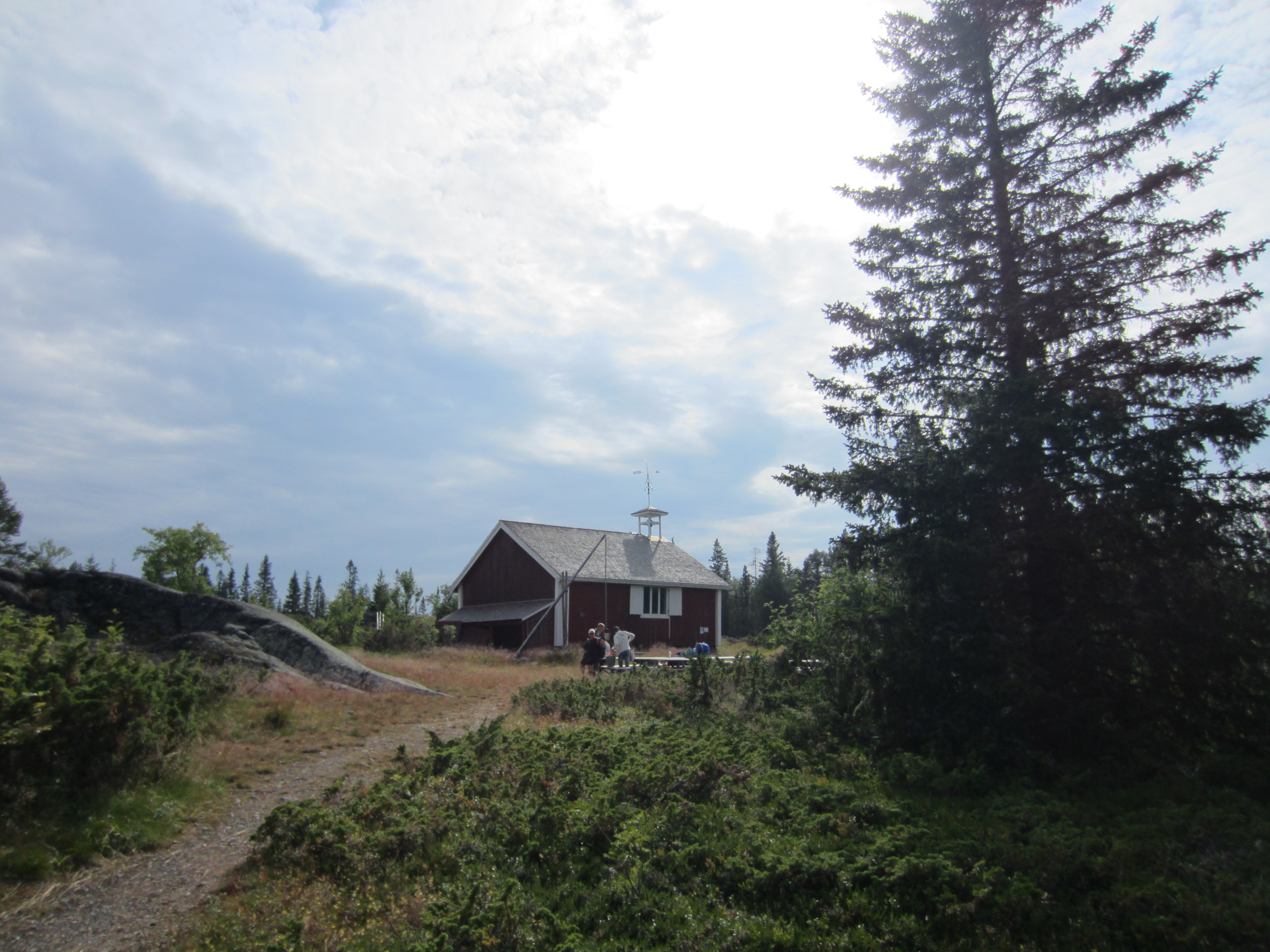
Old chapel on Småskär

The Luleå archipelago was described by the Swedish bishop Olaus Magnus in 1555. He praised the fair islands, with constant daylight in the summer, well-covered in trees, bushes and grass, with warm but refreshing air, set in a sea that was rich in fish. The islands are rich in wild berries including lingonberries, blueberries, raspberries, Arctic raspberries, cloudberries, wild strawberries and seabuckthorn. They have a large and varied bird population. The outer islands are considered more vulnerable, with more sensitive vegetation.

A number of islands are in whole or part included in the Natura 2000 ecological network of the European Union, including sixteen nature reserves that cover 16,340 hectares (40,400 acres) of which 1,392 hectares (3,440 acres) is land. There is one 5 hectares (12 acres) biotope protected area. There are eight bird sanctuaries covering 1,670 hectares (4,100 acres) of which 366 hectares (900 acres) is land. These are off-limits to visitors during the months of May, June and July, when the birds are breeding. Most of the protected nature reserves and bird sanctuaries are in the outer zone.

== Economy ==
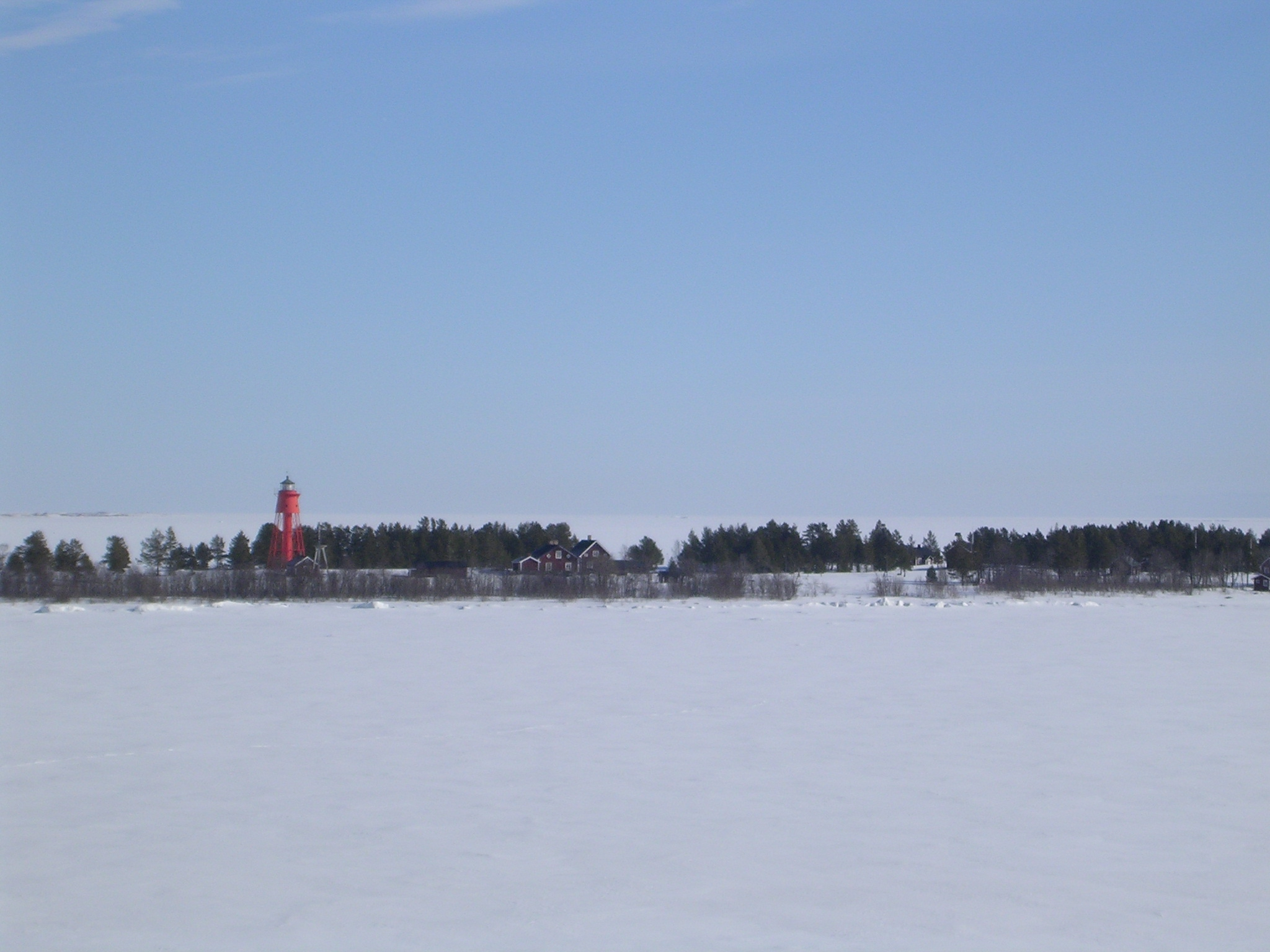
Rödkallen in winter

Some of the islands are inhabited or have seasonal fishing villages used by people from the mainland. As of 1999 there were only 80 permanent residents of the islands, mostly old people who had lived there all their lives. There was just one farmer and twelve commercial fishermen, all single men. However, there may be a trend for second homes on Sandön to be transformed into permanent homes. In some winters, Sami reindeer herders from the Lule River valley bring their herds across the ice for grazing on the islands, but only if required by weather conditions.

As of 2004 there were over 8,000 small boats in Luleå, or about one for every eight people, letting the inhabitants of the city access the islands of the archipelago for recreation. In the winter the larger islands may be accessed via ice roads. The most popular islands for day-trippers are Bastaskär, Hindersön, Kluntarna, Rödkallen and Sandön. Some of the other larger islands include Altappen, Brändöskär, Estersön, Finnskär, Germanön, Hertsöland, Junkön, Kallaxön, Likskär, Långön, Rörbäck Sandöskatan, Sandgrönnorna, Smålsön, Småskär, Stor-Brändön and Uddskär.

As of 2006 the islands attracted less than 500 tourists annually. Visitor activities include water sports and hunting in the summer and ice-fishing, skiing and snowmobiling in the winter. In the summer there is little rain, and the temperate water and sandy beaches are attractive to visitors. The Luleå municipality is committed to developing tourism and recreation in such a way that there is no damage to the environment or to the values of the local society. Tourists are encouraged to visit the inner zone islands, while the ecologically more sensitive outer zone is deliberately made less accessible. The municipality maintains navigation marks, hostels, cabins, saunas and barbecue spots, and local entrepreneurs provide other facilities for visitors.

== Gallery ==
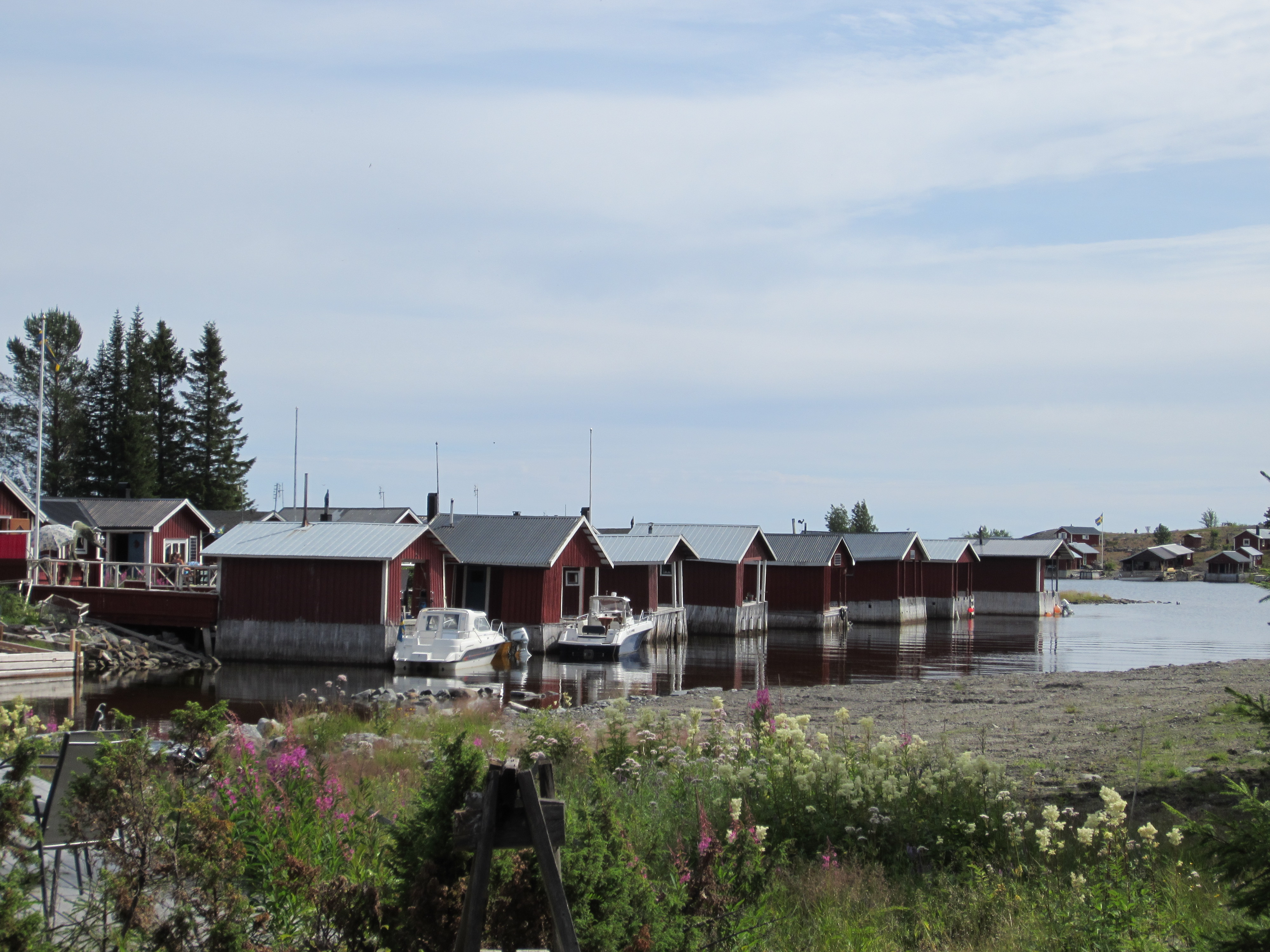
Old fishing huts at Brändöskär

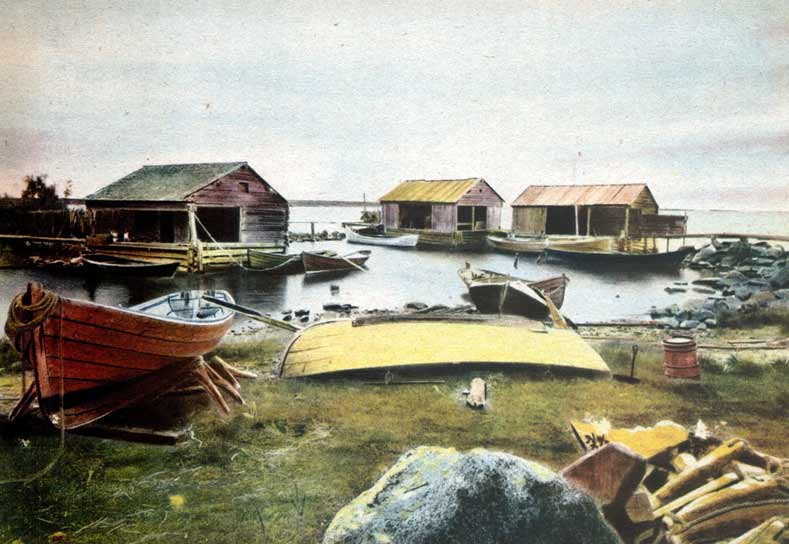
Boats and boathouses at Stor-Brändön around 1935

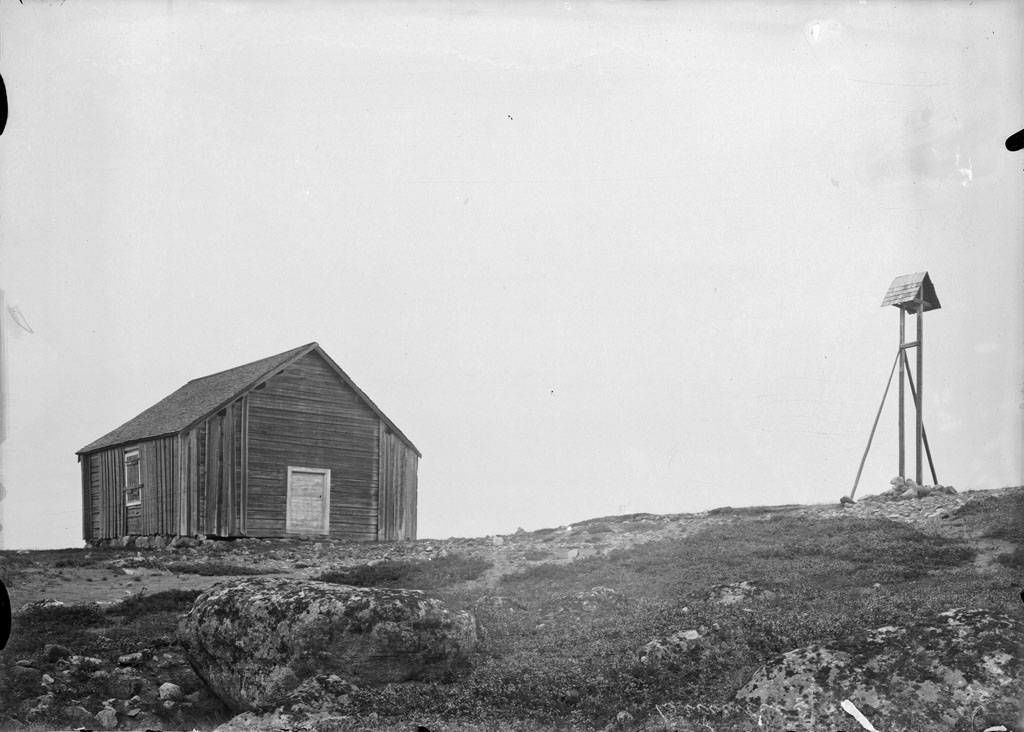
Old chapel on Brändöskär c. 1900

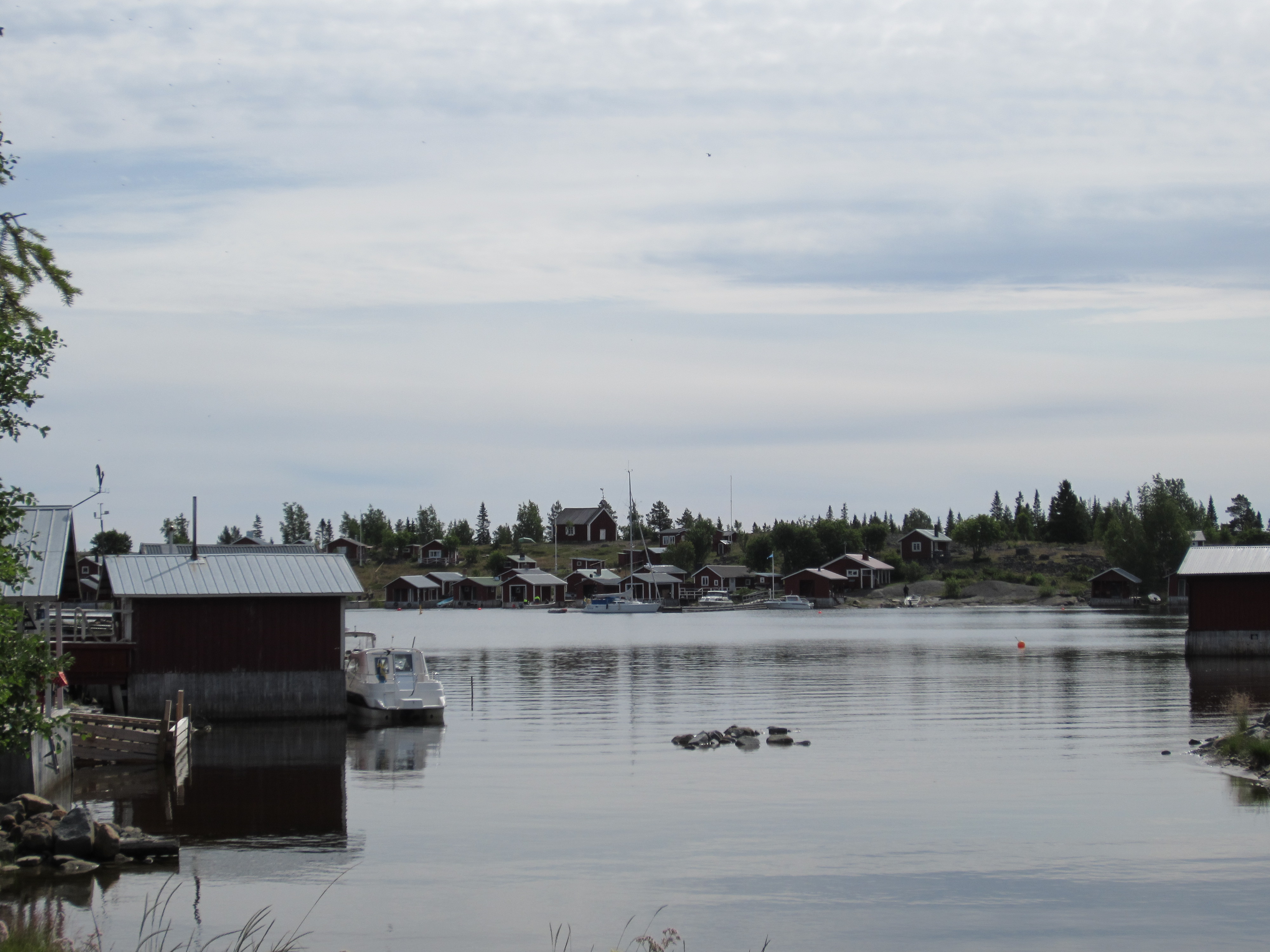
Old fishing huts at Brändöskär today used for recreation

== See also ==
- List of islands of the Luleå archipelago
