= Bondaholmen =

Island in Sweden

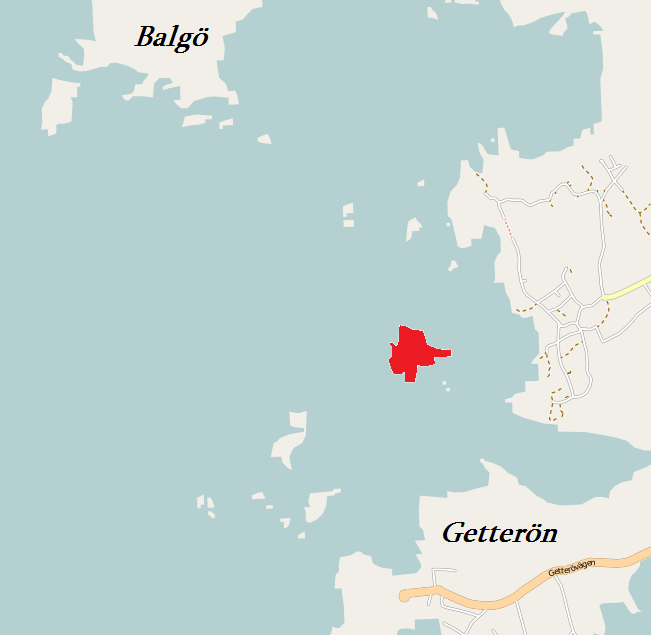
- Map with Bondaholmen highlighted.

Geography
- Coordinates: 57°8′15.32″N 12°12′4.54″E

Administration
- Sweden
- Province: Halland
- County: Halland County
- Municipality: Varberg Municipality

Bondaholmen is a small island in Kattegat, situated off Trönningenäs in Varberg Municipality, Sweden. It is between Getterön and Balgö.
