= Långön =

Island in the country of Sweden

- Location within Sweden

Geography
- Coordinates: 65.522914°N 22.584232°E
- Adjacent to: Bay of Bothnia
- Area: 572 ha (1,410 acres)

Administration
- Sweden
- Province: Norrbotten
- Municipality: Luleå

Långön is an island in the northwest of the Swedish sector of the Bay of Bothnia, in the Luleå archipelago.

== Description ==
Långön is a relatively large island in the Luleå archipelago, with an area of 572 hectares (1,410 acres). It lies to the north of Stor-Brändön and west of Mjoön. It has a fine sandy beach on the north shore, but the beach is exposed to the weather. The land has gently rolling hills, the highest being Storberget on the north side at 30 metres (98 ft). The island is mostly tree-covered, with some scattered bogs of different sizes and one shallow lake. As of 2008 there were five permanent residents on the island. There were 18 houses, mostly summer cabins.

== Access ==
Boats can land on the beach. There is a private harbor that can be used by visitors to the residents of the island. In winter the island can be accessed via an ice road, the longest in Sweden at 15 kilometres (9.3 mi). It runs from Hindersöstallarna on the mainland to the islands of Hindersön, Stor-Brändön and Långön. Normally the road is open from January to April. Vehicle weight restrictions apply. Ploughing of the section leading into Långön is funded privately. In the winter there is a groomed and marked snowmobile trail between Långön and Småskär to the east.

The "magic strait" between Långön and Hindersön was dredged to a depth of 3.3 metres (11 ft) in 2012 to allow faster access from Luleå to the islands of the outer archipelago for sailboats and large tour boats.
