= Selkä-Sarvi =

- Location within Lapland

Geography
- Location: Bothnian Bay
- Coordinates: 65°36.6′N 024°11.8′E

Administration
- Finland

Selkä-Sarvi is an island belonging to the Bay of Bothnia National Park in the waters of the city of Kemi in the Bay of Bothnia. The island is located near the Finland–Sweden border, about 21 kilometers southwest of the center of Kemi. It belongs to the archipelago formed by Savukrunni, Sarvenkrunni, Pitkäletto, Linnanklupu and Maa-Sarvi, as well as Sarvenkataja on the Swedish side.

The island is also the second largest island in the Bay of Bothnia National Park. It is about 1.3 kilometers long and at its widest about 500 meters wide. Its highest point rises to a height of about four meters above sea level. At the northernmost tip of the island is the Sarvi excursion port, to which a marked boat lane leads from the northwest. According to several sources, the island should have a stone labyrinth, but in the 1994 inventory no indication of a labyrinth was found on the island .

The island of Selkä-Sarvi is an old fishing base. At most, the island has had a population during the heyday, when the island's population rose to about three hundred. Eight of the buildings of the old fishing village in the southeast corner of the island are still left, in addition to the remains of several buildings and cellars in the area. In addition to the fisherman's base at the northern end of the island, there is a national park scout lodge, a steel lookout tower and a helicopter landing area.

A north-south nature trail leads from north to south through the island, with large quarries in the southern parts of the island at its southern end and the Ailinpieti fishing hut, built in the 1860s and open to visitors. For overnight stays, there is the Kalla hut, suitable for summer use only, as well as a four-person reservation hut Kokko, which has been renovated from an old fish salting room.

In the northern parts of the island, the forests comprise a juniper grove growing on a sandy bottom, on the edges of which mainly deciduous trees and, rarely, pines grow. There are few shore bushes, and on the eastern shore of the island is the largest and widest unified coastal meadow area in the national park. The western shore of the island is broken and consists mainly of scattered quarries, in the areas between which shore meadows grow. The island has five ponds, and the southern end of the island is made up of quarries and coastal meadows bordering the lagoon.
