= Jävre Sandön =

Island in the Piteå archipelago, Sweden

Coordinates: 65°05′45″N 21°35′25″E

Jävre Sandön is a Swedish island belonging to the Piteå archipelago. The island is located off the coast of Jävrebodarna. Jävre Sandön means "island of sand at Jävre". The island has a coastline consisting of beaches. There are two footpaths over the island. There are also remains of a fishing camp from before 1500 and a stone labyrinth.
