= Hertsön =

Island in the country of Sweden

- Location within Sweden

Geography
- Coordinates: 65.584159°N 22.199539°E
- Adjacent to: Bothnian Bay
- Area: 73.42 km^{2} (28.35 sq mi)

Administration
- Sweden
- County: Norrbotten
- Municipality: Luleå

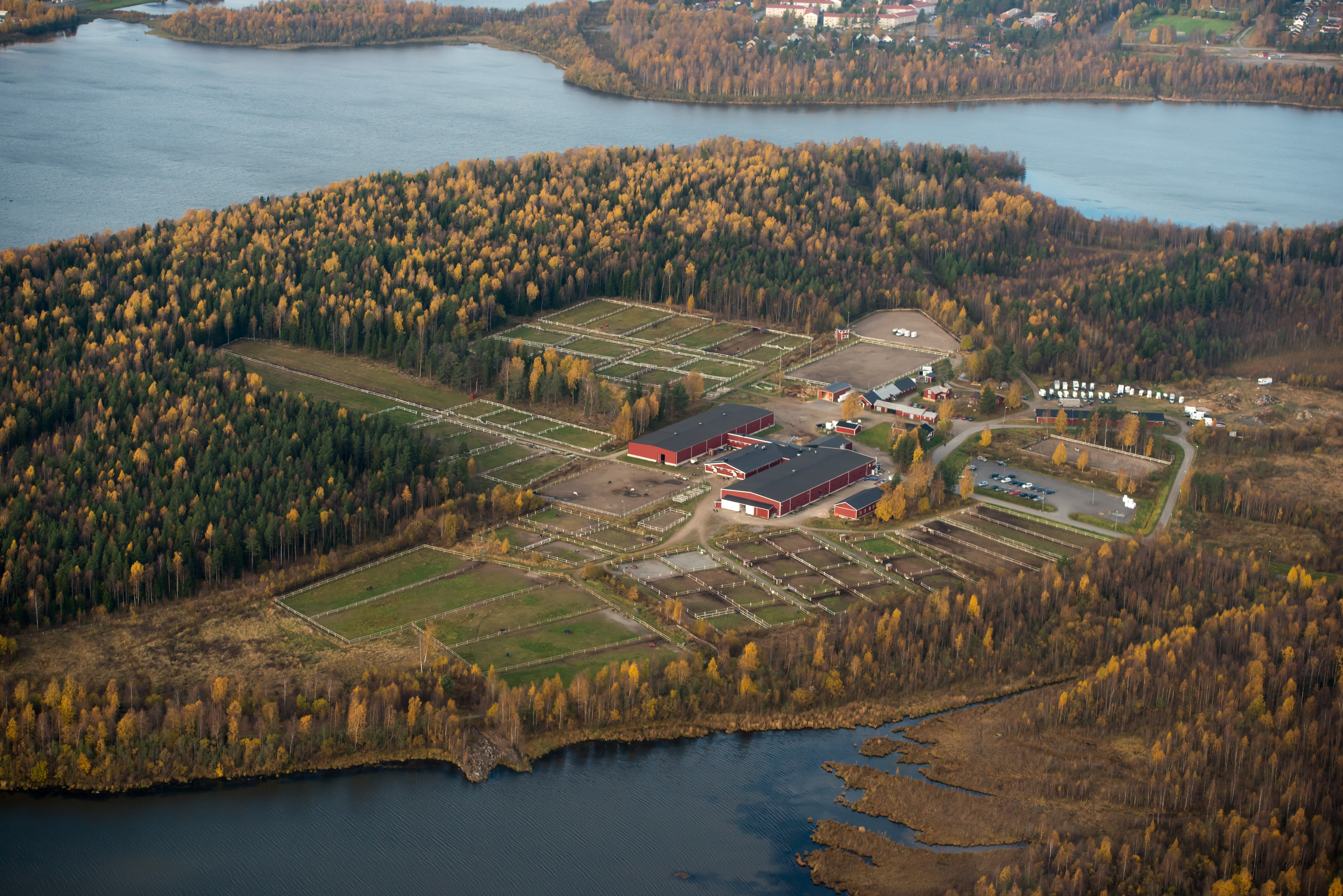
Luleå Ridklubb

Hertsön is a Swedish island in the Bothnian Bay, largely occupied by the eastern districts of the city of Luleå.

Due to post-glacial rebound, the islands Svartön, Mulön, Granön and Björkön have merged with the island. The size of the island is around 73.42 km², making it the twelfth largest island in Sweden.
