= Junkön =

Island in the Luleå archipelago, Sweden

- Location within Sweden

Geography
- Coordinates: 65.454963°N 22.396309°E
- Adjacent to: Bay of Bothnia

Administration
- Sweden
- Province: Norrbotten
- Municipality: Luleå

Junkön is an island in the northwest of the Swedish sector of the Bay of Bothnia, in the Luleå archipelago.

== Location ==
Junkön is one of the larger of the islands offshore from Luleå. It is said to be named after a Sami named Junker who grazed his reindeer on the island. The sandy western part of the island has been used by the air force as a firing range since World War II, and is off limits to civilians. The eastern part of the island is well-forested, including pines that are over 200 years old.

The Larsgrundet lighthouse is located on a shoal in the channel between the islands of Junkön and Storbrändön. It was built in 1965, and was still in operation as of 2013. The focal plane is 18 metres (59 ft).

== History ==
The first records of the island date to 1491. The island would have been quite new then, having formed as the terrain rose due to post-glacial rebound. The first permanent resident settled on the island in 1783. There is a solidly built windmill dating from the late 1700s, in the past used by the residents of Junkön and nearby islands to grind their flour. It is not certain who built it, but based on its design it may have been a stranded fisherman from Finland.

Since the early 1900s the population has steadily diminished. As of 2013 there were only three resident families. A number of professional fishermen still make Junkön their base, fishing for Baltic herring, whitefish and sea trout in the summer. They net a local species of whitefish in the autumn to harvest its roe, which is called the "gold of the sea".

== Village ==
The marina can accommodate about ten boats. There is a café that opens in the summer, toilets, saunas, showers and drinking water. The "Junkön fishing village" was inaugurated in 1998, a group of newly built houses in traditional style with an exhibition on life on the islands in the old days. The Luleå Municipality has also built a quay, boathouses and a boat motor museum. Two cottages are available for rent.
