= Baggen =

Island in the country of Sweden

- Location within Sweden

Geography
- Coordinates: 65.326288°N 21.776910°E
- Adjacent to: Bay of Bothnia

Administration
- Sweden
- Province: Norrbotten
- Municipality: Piteå Municipality

Demographics
- Population: Uninhabited

Baggen is an island in the northwest of the Swedish sector of the Bay of Bothnia, in the Piteå archipelago.

== Location ==
Baggen is about 8 kilometres (5.0 mi) from Renöhamn. The island can be reached by boat from Piteå in 10 to 25 minutes depending on weather conditions. There are rental cabins. The west side of the island has steep rocky cliffs. The name may have Sami origin, from the word "Pakte", meaning "crag". Baggen has an open air chapel, which is often used for marriages. It consists of a wooden cross, a simple altar in the form of a flat stone slab and benches of rough hewn logs.

The island has been considered as a site for wind power generation, as have Rånön in Kalix, Vargön in Piteå and Stor-Brändön in Luleå. However a 2009 report concluded that construction could not be justified given the relatively small potential capacity, the cost and environmental damage.
