= Hindersön =

Island in the country of Sweden

- Location within Sweden

Geography
- Coordinates: 65.570883°N 22.580112°E
- Adjacent to: Bay of Bothnia

Administration
- Sweden
- Province: Norrbotten
- Municipality: Luleå

Demographics
- Population: 30

Hindersön is an island in the northwest of the Swedish sector of the Bay of Bothnia, in the Luleå archipelago.

== Location ==
Hindersön is one of the largest of the islands in the Luleå Archipelago. It is about 3 kilometres (1.9 mi) east of central Luleå. The island includes old farms and fishing ports. The school building and teacher's residence have been modernized for use for conferences and for rental accommodation. In winter the island can be accessed via an ice road, the longest in Sweden at 15 kilometres (9.3 mi). It runs from Hindersöstallarna on the mainland to the islands of Hindersön, Stor-Brändön and Långön. Normally the road is open from January to April. Vehicle weight restrictions apply.

== Environment ==
Hindersön is made up of three smaller islands that have grown together through as the land rose through post-glacial rebound. The island names are preserved in Hindersön for the central part, Björkön for the eastern part and Gräsön for the western part. Hindersön is largely covered by spruce forest. There is also pine forest and open sandy regions. Smaller plants include wild strawberries, brambles and lily of the valley. Arctic raspberries, the rare Siberian primrose and ghost orchid may also be found. There are small sandy beaches on the northern tip of Holmberg and Hanno Bay.

The fauna is typical of the Luleå archipelago. Hares are common. Ospreys nest on the island.

== History ==
The name of the island is from "Hinders", an old form of "Henry". It may be named after Henry, bishop of Finland, the medieval patron saint of Finland. Hindersön has good conditions for agriculture and is surrounded by productive fishing waters. In the past seals were plentiful and were hunted by the first settlers. There are records of occupation on the island from 1543, when four homesteads were recorded. Settlers had probably arrived some time before. A record from 1559 gave 30 people, four horses, 21 cows, six heifers, 25 sheep, eleven goats and two pigs were divided between the four homesteads. At the time of the 1851-56 land reform, the island had eight homesteads.

Iron ore was found in 1842, and was mined at different times thereafter. The iron ore mine was opened in the 1870s by a professor Anders Fornander, who built a stone memorial to himself. Gunpowder was used in mining before dynamite was discovered. The granite powder magazine has been restored and may be seen at Oxgrundet when travelling by boat through "Västisundet". Lime was quarried for local use, and later an industrial lime kiln was built just northeast of Hannosviken. The kiln has been restored.

By 1930 the population peaked at 148. After World War II ended in 1945 the population steadily declined, with first the shops and then the school being closed. Today about thirty full-time residents remain.
