= Stor-Brändön =

Island in the country of Sweden

- Location within Sweden

Geography
- Coordinates: 65.492036°N 22.536682°E
- Adjacent to: Bay of Bothnia
- Area: 10 km^{2} (3.9 sq mi)

Administration
- Sweden
- Province: Norrbotten

Demographics
- Population: 9

Stor-Brändön is an island in the northwest of the Swedish sector of the Bay of Bothnia, in the Luleå archipelago.

== Location ==
Stor-Brändön is one of the larger islands of the Luleå archipelago, with nine permanent residents as of 2013. It is about 12 kilometres (7.5 mi) southeast of the city of Luleå. The island lies in shallow water. It has a well-protected harbor, and some visitor accommodation. Small boats can beach at locations in the Brändö sound or at Storsanden on the south coast. In winter the island can be accessed via an ice road, the longest in Sweden at 15 kilometres (9.3 mi). It runs from Hindersöstallarna on the mainland to the islands of Hindersön, Stor-Brändön, and Långön. Normally the road is open from January to April. Vehicle weight restrictions apply.

== Description ==
The village of Storbrändön in the north of the island is protected under a program for agricultural landscapes. There is a protected bird area in the west of the island, which cannot be accessed during the summer. The highest point of the island is 30 metres (98 ft) above sea level. The island has been considered as a site for wind power generation, as have Vargön and Baggen in Piteå and Rånön in Kalix. However a 2009 report concluded that construction could not be justified given the relatively small potential capacity, the cost and environmental damage.

The Larsgrundet lighthouse is located on a shoal in the channel between the islands of Junkön and Storbrändön. It was built in 1965, and was still in operation as of 2013. The focal plane is 18 metres (59 ft).

== Gallery ==
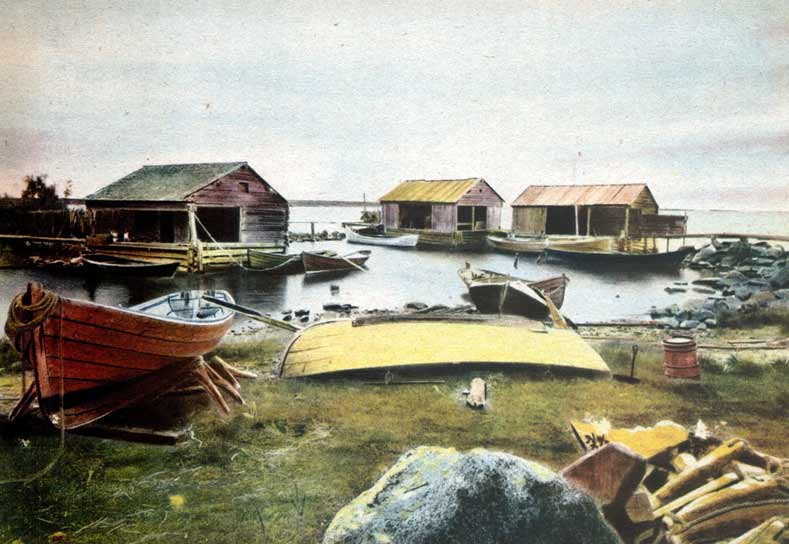
Boats and boathouses at Stor-Brändön around 1935
