= Brändöskär =

Island in the Luleå archipelago, Sweden

Brändöskär and Uddskär
- Location within Sweden

Geography
- Coordinates: 65.524682°N 22.801431°E
- Adjacent to: Bay of Bothnia

Administration
- Sweden
- Province: Norrbotten
- Municipality: Luleå

Brändöskär and Uddskär are two islands in the northwest of the Swedish sector of the Bay of Bothnia, in the Luleå archipelago, joined by an isthmus. In the past there was a large summer fishing village around the bay between the two islands. Many of the buildings remain, and are now used for recreational purposes.

== Location ==
Brändöskär is located in the outer part of the Luleå archipelago, about 20 kilometres (12 mi) east of Lövskär on the mainland. Brändöskär is joined to the island of Uddskär by an isthmus. The cottages and boathouses of a fishing village were built around the bay between Brändöskär and Uddskär when the two islands were separate. (Note: The Bothnian Bay region is rising relatively quickly in geological terms due to post-glacial rebound. As a result, islands become larger over time, formerly separate islands are joined and former islands are now connected to the mainland.) The island was named after the fishing village of Brändön on the mainland. Brändöskär may be reached in summer by tour boats from Luleå. In the winter it is accessible on skis, ice skates or snowmobile.

== Village ==
There is a beautiful fishing village on Brändöskär in a sheltered inlet with a public dock, with log fishing huts that have survived from the past. The old chapel, the Brändö-Uddskärs kapell, was built in 1774 by the fishermen of the outer Luleå archipelago. There is also a turf maze on the island.

A cottage may be rented in the village. In August 2013 it was reported that new municipal rental cottages were to be built in the fall, ready for the next summer. There would be a service building with toilets and three new cottages. One old cottage would also be rehabilitated. The wall sections and other material were being barged to the harbor, and then lifted to the construction site by helicopter to avoid any damage to the land.

== Environment ==
The islands are often windswept, but have a wild beauty. The severe climate of the outer archipelago gives Brändöskär an unusually barren environment. The terrain consists of rocky outcrops, weathered moraine, rocks and sand. Most outcrops show the effects of glaciation in polishing the rock and creating striations. Haparanda-monzoniten is a common type of rock on the two islands, with large black and white crystals.

Vegetation on Brändöskär includes lichen, moss, heath and low, windblown trees. This is similar to that of mountain terrain. However, plants such as lily of the valley, and orchids may be found in sheltered locations. Rare plants include torplås and nordlåsbräken. The vegetation on Uddskär is richer and denser, with large forested areas of pine, spruce, birch and aspen, and with small and large mires.

The Brändöskär municipal nature reserve was founded in 2005, covering 212 hectares (520 acres) between the chapel and the southern tip of the island. It also includes Haraskär, Hällgrund island and the Persögrund peninsula. The reserve is an important site for birds, and is off limits between 1 May and 31 July. At other times, hiking, fishing and hunting are allowed, as are picking berries and mushrooms, camping and making fires on designated sites.

== History ==
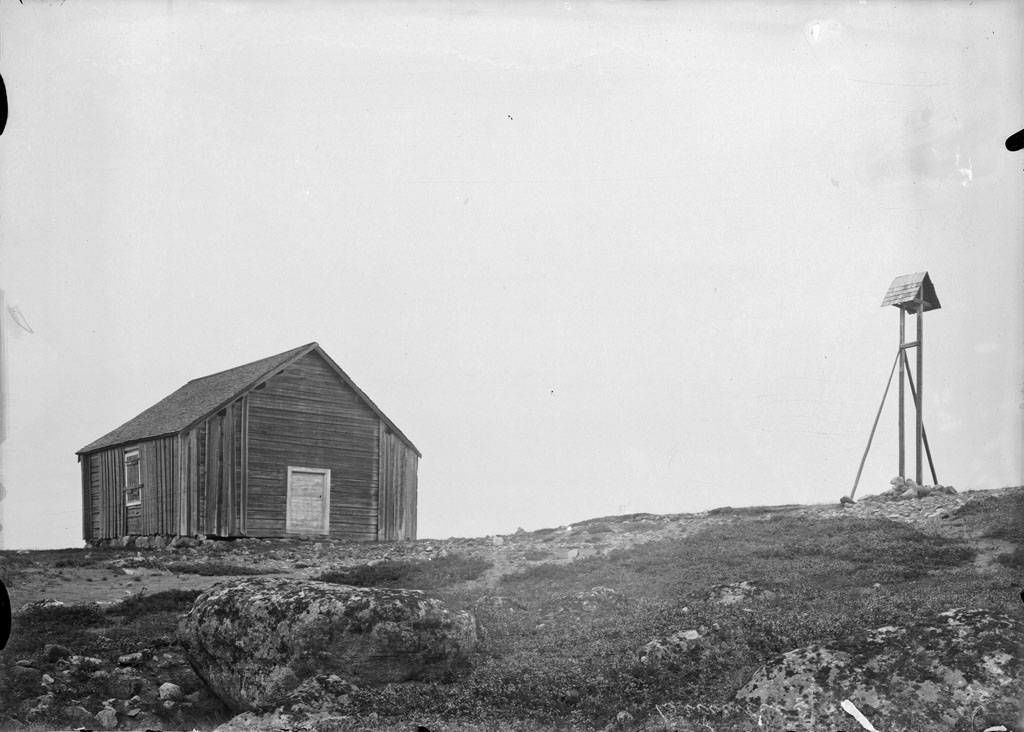
Brändö-Uddskär Chapel about 1900

When the fishing village was built, Brändöskär and Uddskär were two separate islands. Probably the main part of the original village was on Uddskär. It is said that Queen Christina donated Brändöskär to Norrbrändö, but no records of this transaction have been found. Although now used only for recreation, many of the cottages are still owned by families from Brändön.

In 1820 about thirty boats were based at Brändöskär / Uddskär, the largest fishing village in the Luleå Archipelago. The main catch was herring, which was caught in nets, salted and sold in wooden barrels in Luleå, Haparanda, Raahe and Oulu. Whitefish, grayling, salmon, pike, perch and ide were also caught, but mainly consumed locally. A harbor master enforced tight regulations over fishing and enforced the law. No fishing was allowed between 6 pm on Saturday and 6 pm on Sunday, when the fishermen observed a day of rest.

The artist Erik Marklund (c. 1909 – 1980) lived and worked on Brändöskär. He mainly worked in oils or pencil drawing, portraying the life of the island and the archipelago. In 1957 he built a statue of Jesus on a small outcrop, Hällgrund, off shore from the island. It still stands today, and is visible from a distance in clear weather. Marklund also made the altar in the chapel. The altarpiece depicts a rich haul of fish from the surrounding waters.

== Gallery ==
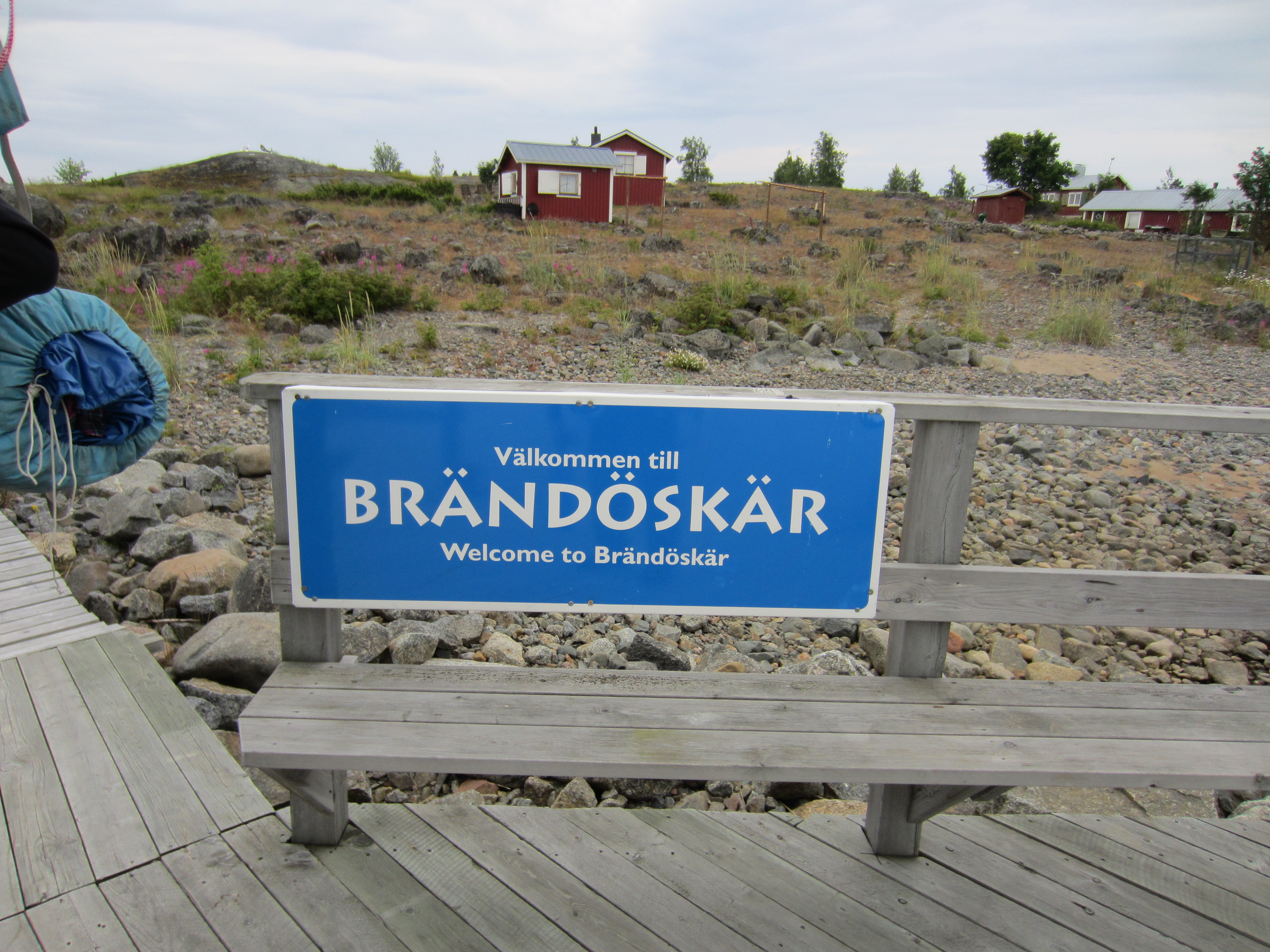
Welcome to Brändöskär

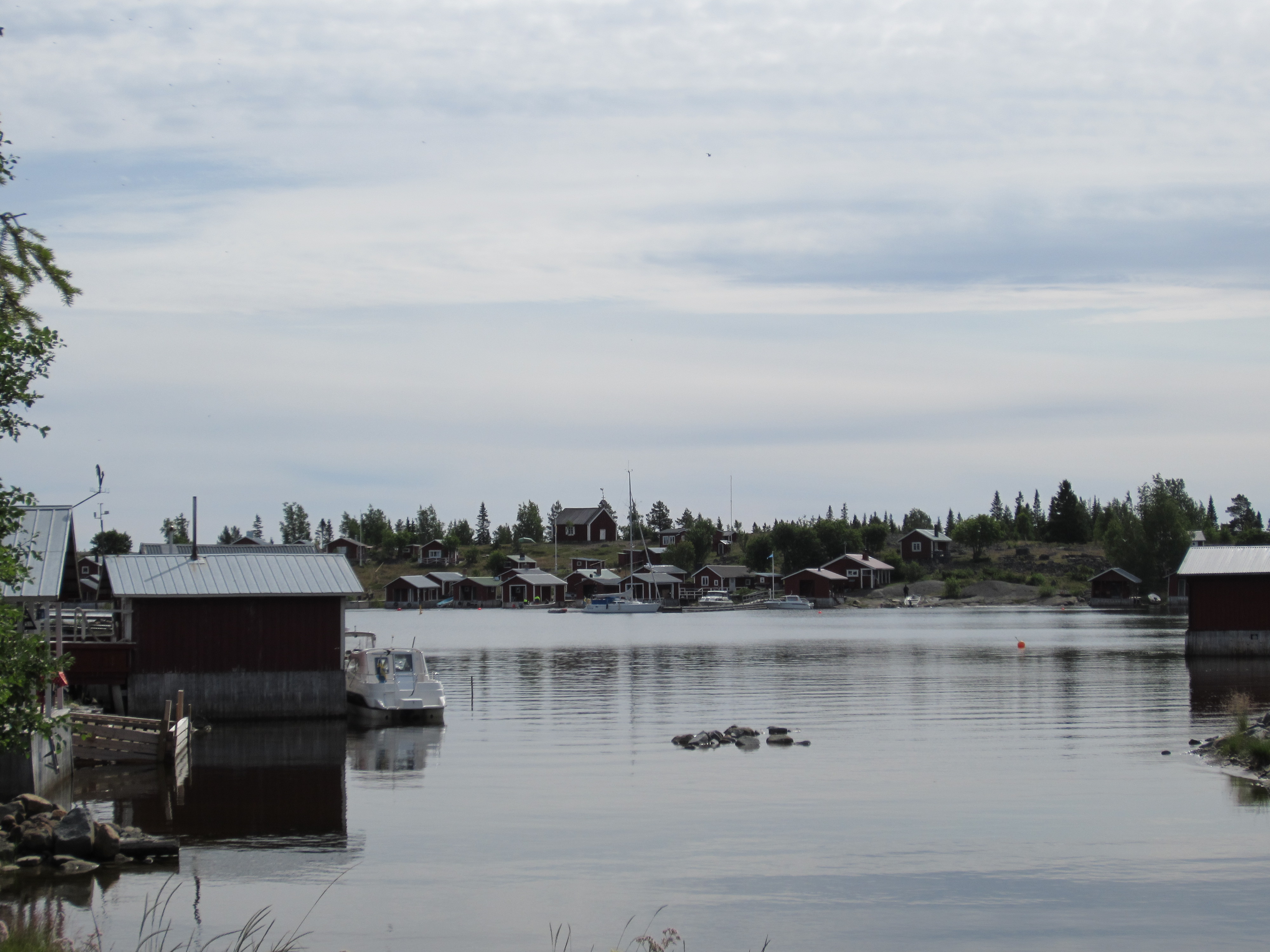
Old fishing huts at Brändöskär today used for recreation. The Brändöskär chapel can be seen on the other side of the bay on the top of the hill.

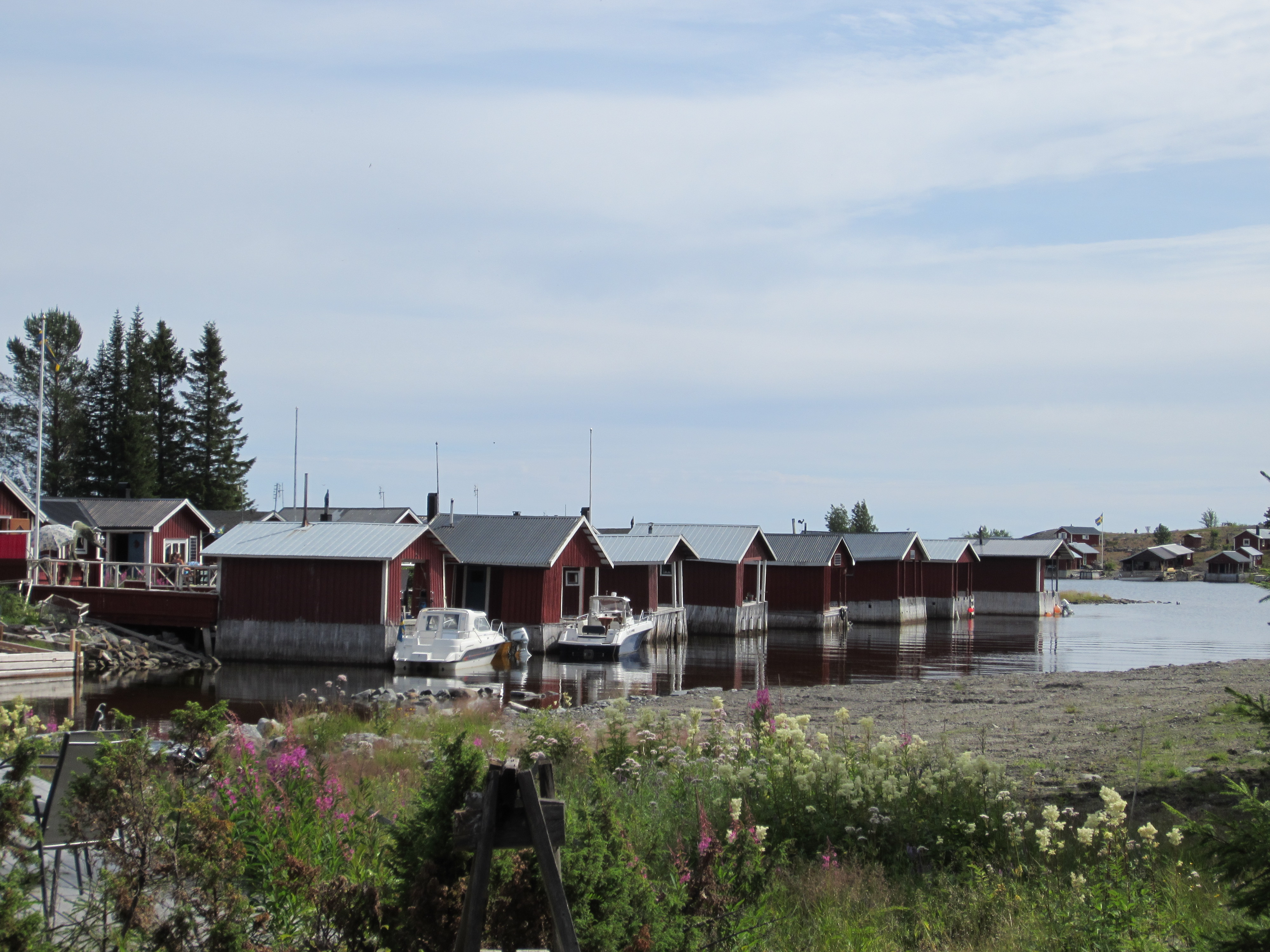
Old fishing huts at Brändöskär today used for recreation.
