= Rödkallen =

Lighthouse and island in Sweden

Rödkallen South lighthouse Rödkallen Södra
- Location: Rödkallen, Luleå Municipality, Sweden
- Coordinates: 65°18′51″N 22°22′11″E

Tower
- Constructed: 1966
- Foundation: concrete
- Construction: masonry 5-storey building
- Height: 18 metres (59 ft)
- Shape: building with lantern on the roof
- Markings: Yellow, red, white (lantern)
- Operator: Swedish Maritime Administration (Sjöfartsverket)

Light
- Focal height: 22 m (72 ft)
- Range: 9 nmi (17 km; 10 mi)
- Characteristic: LFl WRG 10s
- Sweden no.: SV-0354
- Rödkallen old lighthouse Rödkallen
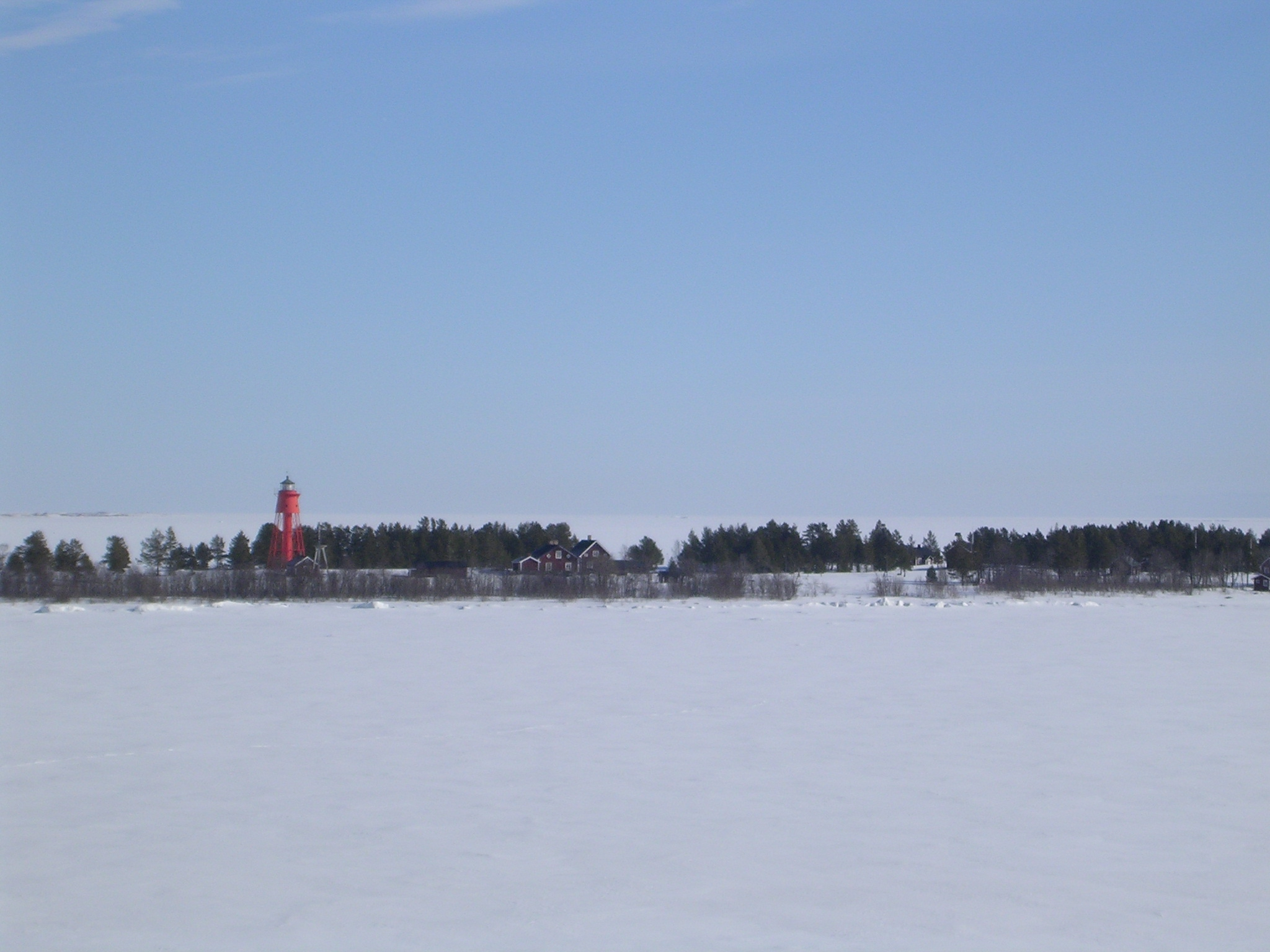
- Rödkallen in winter
- Constructed: 1872
- Foundation: concrete
- Construction: cast iron skeletal tower
- Automated: 1966
- Height: 21.4 m (70 ft)
- Shape: conical skeletal tower with central cylinder, balcony and lantern
- Markings: red tower, greenish lantern roof
- Power source: rapeseed oil, kerosene, electricity
- Heritage: governmental listed building
- Deactivated: 1972
- Focal height: 25 m (82 ft)
- Lens: parabolic mirrors (original), 1st order Fresnel lens (1893)
- Range: 15 nmi (28 km; 17 mi)
- Characteristic: Exting (1972–)

Rödkallen is a small uninhabited (summer cabins are in use) Swedish island and lighthouse station located in the Bothnian Bay in the south part of Luleå archipelago. The island was used by fishermen a long time before the lighthouse was built. In 1800 a chapel was built for the fishermen and it survives to this day.

== Lighthouse ==
The lighthouse was constructed after Nils Gustaf von Heidenstam's skeletal iron design. Originally it carried a colza oil lamp which was changed to a kerosene lamp 1884. In 1936 a small electric plant was built on the island which was used by the lighthouse. After one hundred years in service the old lighthouse was deactivated in favor of the small modern Rödkallen södra (south) light on the roof of a pilot station. The tall building has a yellow and red daymark. The station was closed down in 1981. A small hotel was started in the building in 2000, but it was closed in 2008. The old lighthouse is preserved and its large lens still mounted, covered with a shroud. In 2005 it was successfully tested for a while. On the island is also a couple of old stone mazes. Rödkallen is one of the many wind observation stations in the shipping news of the Swedish Meteorological and Hydrological Institute.

== Important Bird Area ==
The island has been designated an Important Bird Area (IBA) by BirdLife International because it supports breeding populations of Caspian terns and black guillemots.

== Climate ==
Rödkallen has a humid continental climate (Köppen Dfb) heavily influenced by its offshore position in a shallow and brackish sea surrounded by subarctic landmasses. It is also among the drier stations in Sweden. There is heavy seasonal lag in winter due to the formation of sea ice during the course of average winters. As the ice gradually melts in early spring, the island is sizeably cooler than the mainland during afternoons. This remains during summer, but then diurnal temperature variation lowers and the mild water keeps September above the 10 °C (50 °F) mark rendering it continental rather than subarctic. February is the coldest month of the year but a sizeable margin, whereas July is the warmest with highs averaging about −4 °C (25 °F) in the former and 18 °C (64 °F) in the latter.

During summer, lows in the single-digits are rare in spite of the high latitude. This is due to short nights being tempered by a mild body of water. In fact, many locations in the south of Sweden and on even lower European latitudes have cooler summer nights than Rödkallen. This moderating phenomenon delays winter to a point where November means average above freezing and December has average above the Dfb threshold of −3 °C (27 °F) in the 21st century. When the brackish water eventually freezes, temperatures plummet and sizeable cold waves can set in as the frigid air from the interior is no longer warmed up as it reaches the island. In spring, this can lead to strong cold snaps and ice days in April are quite common. The location is very sunny by Nordic standards and since it is quite a bit drier than where the Luleå sunshine station is located, it could potentially receive more sun than the municipal seat. In summer, there is perpetual twilight for a couple of months during night due to the high latitude. As a result, daylight is sparse in winter.

Rödkallen is a unique climate by Nordic standards for several factors. Due to the ice formation and recession, March is a lot colder than December and autumn is about 4 °C (7.2 °F) warmer in the afternoon than spring. It also has lower diurnals in summer than in winter, which is unusual on high latitudes. The temperature station was set up in 1961 but has several breaks since then, although it came back on a permanent basis in 1996.

Climate data for Rödkallen, (2002–2020 averages; extremes from available data since 1961; sunshine from Luleå 2002–2020)
Month	Jan	Feb	Mar	Apr	May	Jun	Jul	Aug	Sep	Oct	Nov	Dec	Year
Record high °C (°F)	7.1 (44.8)	7.0 (44.6)	6.9 (44.4)	10.2 (50.4)	21.9 (71.4)	26.2 (79.2)	28.9 (84.0)	25.0 (77.0)	19.2 (66.6)	13.3 (55.9)	10.0 (50.0)	5.6 (42.1)	28.9 (84.0)
Mean maximum °C (°F)	2.5 (36.5)	2.6 (36.7)	4.2 (39.6)	7.3 (45.1)	15.7 (60.3)	20.1 (68.2)	22.4 (72.3)	21.1 (70.0)	16.5 (61.7)	11.1 (52.0)	6.4 (43.5)	3.8 (38.8)	23.4 (74.1)
Mean daily maximum °C (°F)	−3.4 (25.9)	−4.1 (24.6)	−1.4 (29.5)	2.6 (36.7)	8.3 (46.9)	14.2 (57.6)	18.1 (64.6)	17.2 (63.0)	12.8 (55.0)	6.7 (44.1)	2.5 (36.5)	−0.6 (30.9)	6.1 (42.9)
Daily mean °C (°F)	−6.1 (21.0)	−7.4 (18.7)	−4.7 (23.5)	0.2 (32.4)	5.9 (42.6)	12.0 (53.6)	16.2 (61.2)	15.5 (59.9)	11.1 (52.0)	5.1 (41.2)	0.8 (33.4)	−2.7 (27.1)	3.8 (38.9)
Mean daily minimum °C (°F)	−8.7 (16.3)	−10.6 (12.9)	−8.0 (17.6)	−2.3 (27.9)	3.4 (38.1)	9.8 (49.6)	14.2 (57.6)	13.7 (56.7)	9.4 (48.9)	3.5 (38.3)	−1.0 (30.2)	−4.8 (23.4)	1.5 (34.8)
Mean minimum °C (°F)	−20.9 (−5.6)	−22.3 (−8.1)	−17.7 (0.1)	−8.6 (16.5)	−1.3 (29.7)	5.6 (42.1)	10.4 (50.7)	9.2 (48.6)	4.1 (39.4)	−2.6 (27.3)	−7.4 (18.7)	−13.8 (7.2)	−25.3 (−13.5)
Record low °C (°F)	−38.0 (−36.4)	−33.1 (−27.6)	−27.0 (−16.6)	−19.7 (−3.5)	−9.0 (15.8)	1.7 (35.1)	6.5 (43.7)	5.6 (42.1)	−0.4 (31.3)	−10.3 (13.5)	−20.5 (−4.9)	−27.7 (−17.9)	−38.0 (−36.4)
Average precipitation mm (inches)	25.5 (1.00)	19.3 (0.76)	18.6 (0.73)	21.7 (0.85)	32.8 (1.29)	47.0 (1.85)	49.2 (1.94)	46.8 (1.84)	47.6 (1.87)	50.0 (1.97)	44.8 (1.76)	40.0 (1.57)	443.3 (17.43)
Mean monthly sunshine hours	21	78	172	225	289	305	310	245	154	92	38	3	1,932
Source 1: SMHI Open Data
Source 2: SMHI Open Data

== See also ==
- List of lighthouses and lightvessels in Sweden
