= Altappen =

Island in the country of Sweden

Altappen and Likskär
- Location within Sweden

Geography
- Coordinates: 65.53772°N 22.343763°E
- Adjacent to: Bay of Bothnia

Administration
- Sweden
- Province: Norrbotten
- Municipality: Luleå

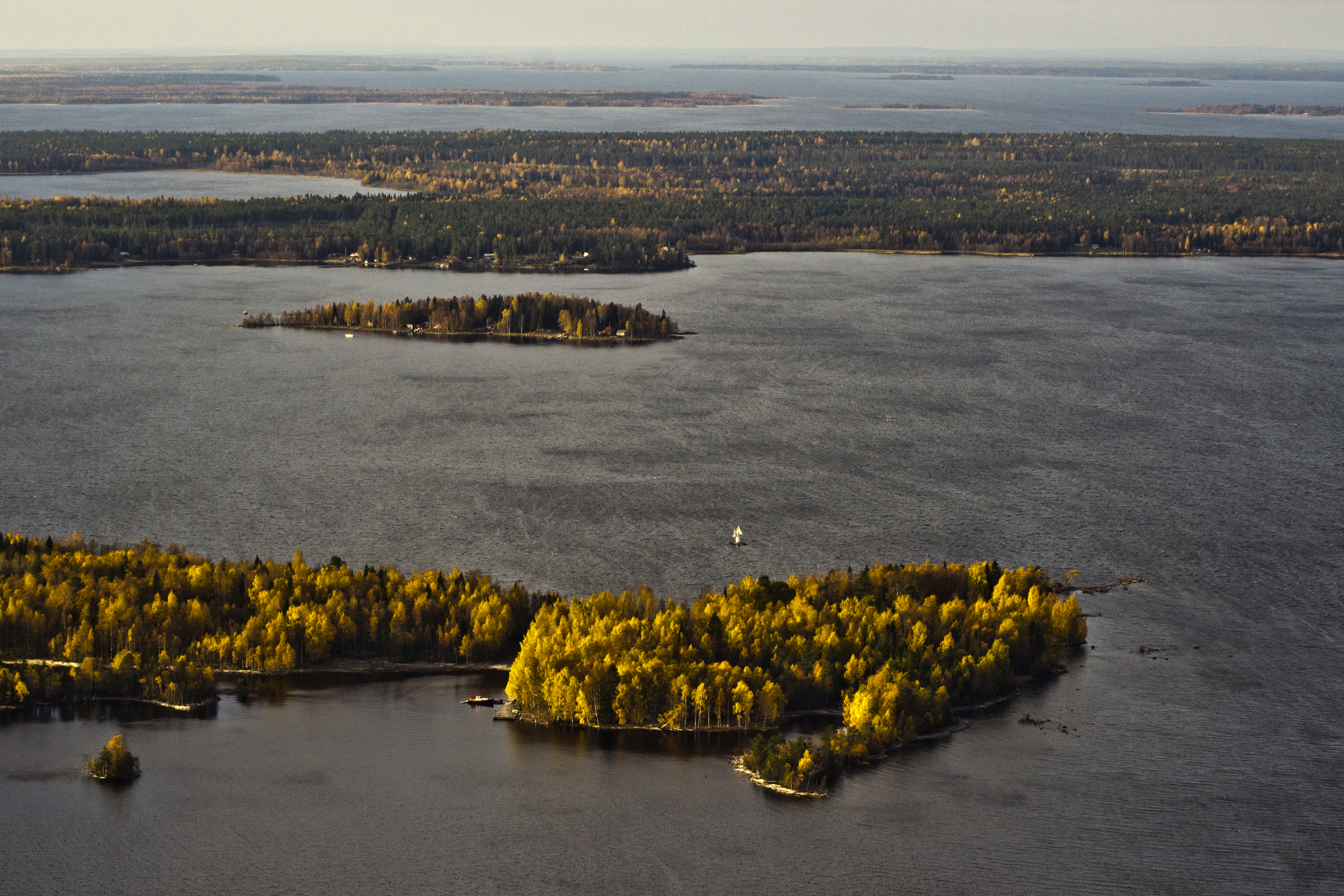

Altappen and Likskär are two islands in the northwest of the Swedish sector of the Bay of Bothnia, in the Luleå archipelago, which have joined due to post-glacial rebound to become a single island.

== Location ==
Altappen lies to the southeast of the city of Luleå, about 1 kilometre (0.62 mi) from the mainland fishing village of Lövskär. In the winter it can be reached via an ice road. Altappen was once the location of a large sawmill, but a major fire in 1908 destroyed the mills and houses, which were never rebuilt. The only building that has survived is the Byggmästarvillan.

With the rising land due to post-glacial rebound, the islands of Altappen and Likskär or Liggskär to the southeast have joined to form a single island. Likskär consists of sand, with long, shallow-water beaches. The local yacht club, Luleå Segelsällskap, has a clubhouse on Likskär. The yacht club facility can accommodate 40 visiting boats, and has a restaurant and sauna that are open to the public. The clubhouse is the base for keel boat racing, and draws sailors from other parts of Sweden and from abroad.

== History ==
The Altappens steam sawmill was built in 1871 with seven cutting frames, operated by the New Gellivara Company under English management. The sawmill became the center of an industrial complex that at times employed up to 1,200 people. In 1879 an iron mill was erected to produce iron bars for export. The power for this operation, including the foundry, machine shop, forge and carpenter's workshop, was provided by a steam engine fueled with wood chips and sawdust from the sawmill. The wood and iron were both exported to England. The sawmill burned down in 1890 but was quickly rebuilt. However, iron production had been phased out by 1896. A fire on 3 July 1908 occurred during a slump, and the owners chose not to rebuild. Almost 600 people were left homeless.
