= Vargön, Piteå =

Island in the Piteå archipelago, Sweden

Vargön
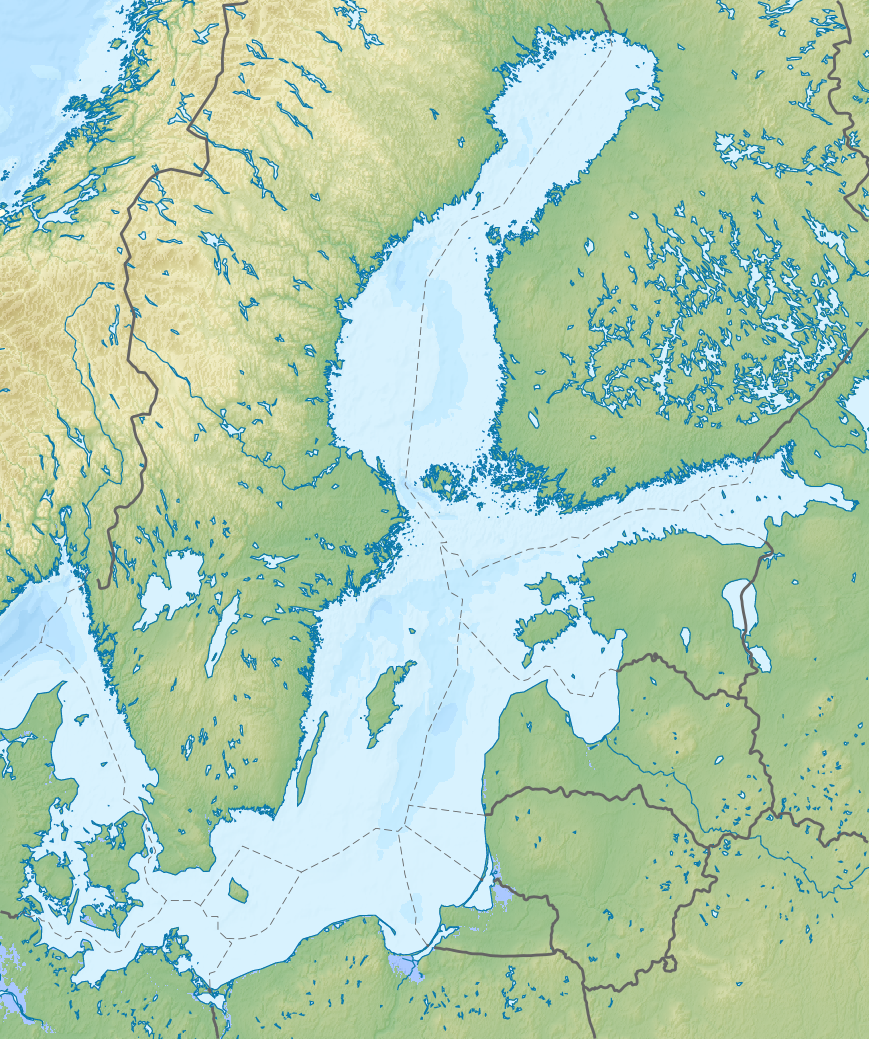
- Location within Sweden Location within Baltic Sea
- Interactive map of Vargön

Geography
- Coordinates: 65°16′N 21°48′E
- Adjacent to: Bay of Bothnia

Administration
- Sweden
- Province: Norrbotten
- Municipality: Piteå Municipality

Demographics
- Population: Uninhabited

Vargön is an island in the northwest of the Swedish sector of the Bay of Bothnia, in the Piteå archipelago.

== Location ==
Vargön lies in the inner archipelago of Piteå. Since 1977, it has been designated a nature reserve. Camping is allowed, and visitors may fish and hunt, pick berries and mushrooms and make fires in designated areas. An old fisherman's cottage may be used for overnight stays. In the winter, when the ice is at least 30 centimetres (12 in) thick, marked snowmobile trails are set from Svartnäsudden (Bredänget) out to Mellerstön, about 6 kilometres (3.7 mi), then to Vargön, about 2 kilometres (1.2 mi).

The island is mainly covered with coniferous forests, but has open sandy areas. Pines grow near the shore and there are thinner old pine forests further inland. The forests are rich in plant species. The island also holds wetlands and different shore environments. Raptors that have been seen nesting on the island included osprey, goshawk and hawk.

The island has been considered as a site for wind power generation, as have Rånön in Kalix, Baggen in Piteå and Stor-Brändön in Luleå. However, a 2009 report concluded that construction could not be justified given the relatively small potential capacity, the cost and environmental damage.
