= Småskär =

Island in the Luleå archipelago, Sweden

Småskär and Finnskär
- Location within Sweden

Geography
- Coordinates: 65.480387°N 22.728550°E
- Adjacent to: Bay of Bothnia

Administration
- Sweden
- Province: Norrbotten
- Municipality: Luleå

Småskär and Finnskär are two closely neighboring islands in the northwest of the Swedish sector of the Bay of Bothnia, in the Luleå archipelago.

== Location ==
Småskär and Finnskär to the east were previously collections of reefs that grew together into islands due to post-glacial rebound. They can be reached in summer by tour boats from Luleå. There are about 120 cottages, but despite this there is still much pristine nature. Småskär has two rental cabins and a sauna located next to the marina.

== Environment ==
On Småskär and the neighboring island of Finnskär there are coniferous forests, deciduous rainforests, old-growth forest, large stands of aspen, wet meadows, wetlands, rocky areas and beaches. The two islands have many excellent habitats for birds, including ponds, shallow bays and old growth forest. There are about 40 nesting bird species, but no rare species are present. Småskär and Finnskär are part of a bird sanctuary where it is prohibited to hunt waterfowl and ducks. The waters to the east of Småskär is the best observation area in the archipelago for seal watching.

== History ==
The fishing village in Kyrkviken on Småskär probably dates from the 1500s. Luleå was founded in 1621 and Småskär, originally called Rammelholmen, was donated to the people of Luleå by Queen Christina in 1652. The chapel at Småskär, built in the 1720s by the residents of Luleå, is the oldest in the archipelago. It was built in what became known as Chapel Bay. This is probably the location of the original fishing village. Some of the buildings of that period have inscriptions from the 1700s. Today they are some distance from the water.

Beside the chapel's altar there is a "gentry bench" that was only for priests and the elite. Outside the chapel is an old stone circle, once the place where meetings were held to decide on fines and other penalties for those who did not observe the Sabbath or follow the rules of the parish. Well into the 1900s the town was an important working fishing village. Now it is used only for recreation, and is one of the most popular destinations in the outer Luleå archipelago.

== Gallery ==
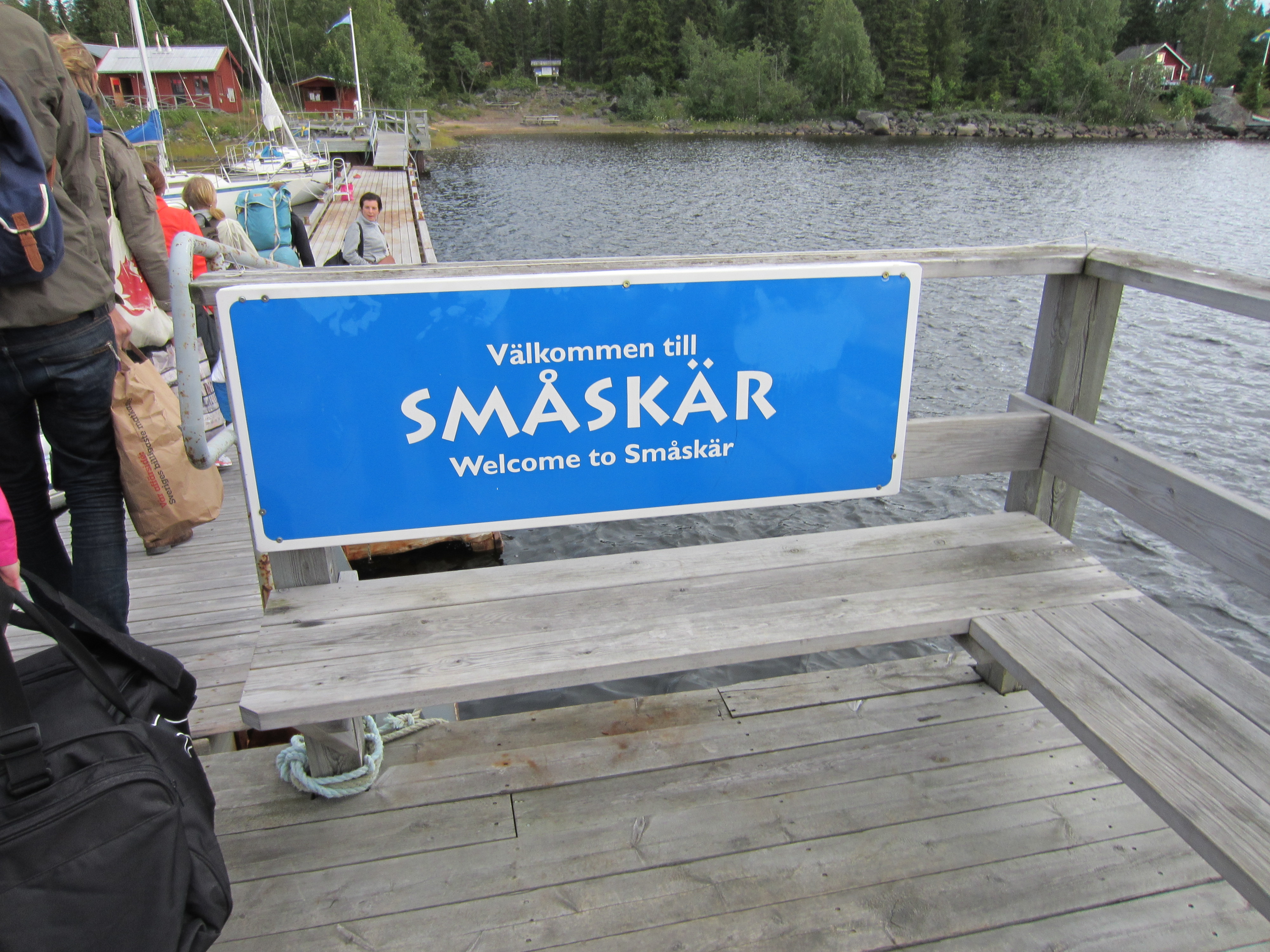
Welcome sign

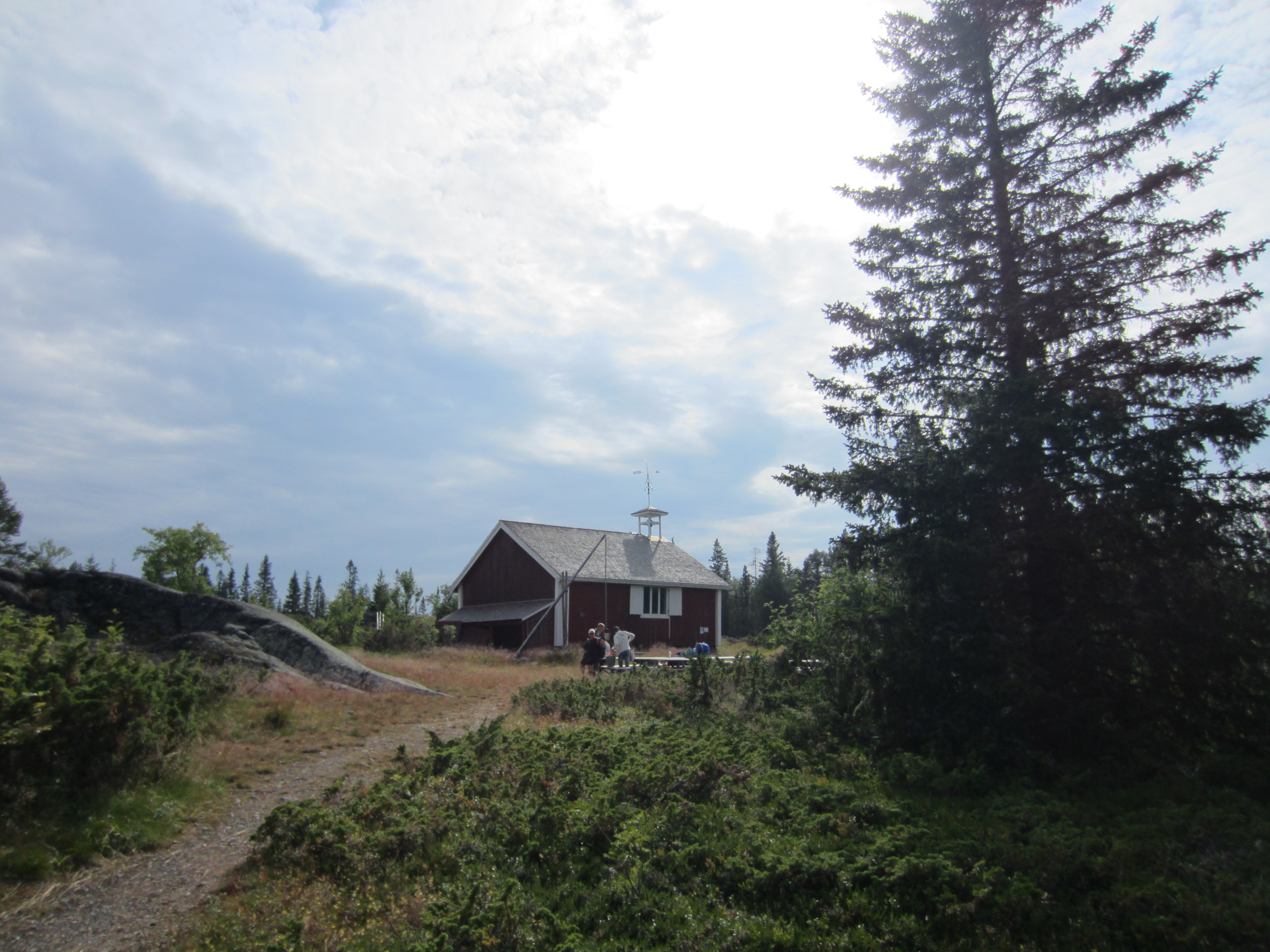
Chapel
