= Piteå archipelago =

- Location within Sweden

Geography
- Coordinates: 65.194°N 21.787°E
- Adjacent to: Bay of Bothnia

Administration
- Sweden
- Province: Norrbotten
- Municipality: Piteå Municipality

The Piteå archipelago (Swedish: Piteå skärgård or Pite skärgård) is a group of Swedish islands in the northern part of the Bay of Bothnia, at Piteå in the southeast of Norrbotten County. A few of the islands have small permanent populations, but most are used only for recreation in the summer months. They are icebound during the winter.

== Location ==
The north of the bay of Bothnia contains a large archipelago area. The islands in the Swedish sector make up the Norrbotten archipelago. It is divided into the archipelagos of Piteå (550 islands), Luleå (1,312 islands), Kalix (792 islands) and Haparanda (652 islands). Due to post-glacial rebound the land is rising at from 0.8 to 1 centimetre (0.31 to 0.39 in) annually, so the shoreline can retreat by as much as 100 metres (330 ft) in one person's lifetime. As a result, the islands are growing in size and the waters and harbors are becoming shallower.

== Climate ==
The archipelago is only 100 kilometres (62 mi) south of the Arctic Circle, so there is daylight for up to 24 hours in the summer, and moonshine may be visible all day in the winter. The waters around the archipelago are brackish, with less the 10% of the salt content of the Atlantic. The sea freezes in January and remain frozen until March–April.

== Islands ==
Baggen is one of the larger islands, with an open-air chapel and rental cabins. Fingermanholmen is almost in the center of Piteå, accessible by boat or kayak in summer, and by ski in winter. Mellerstön has the only permanent residents of the archipelago. Pite-Rönnskär, with a chapel and a lighthouse, is located across the county boundary, in Västerbotten. Other islands include Inre Mörögrund, Mosesholmen, Hällskäret, Stenskär, Stor-Räbben, Svinöra and Vargön.

== Nature reserves ==
There are several nature reserves, including islands and large areas of water. The Bondöfjärden nature reserve is about 10 kilometres (6.2 mi) to the southeast of Piteå town. Bondöfjärden (with Stenskär and other islands), Stor-Räbben and Vargön are state nature reserves, but Piteå Municipality owns the land and manages the reserves. The former Patta Peken reserve, with Pite-Kluntarna and other islands, is since 2018 part of the larger Kallfjärden reserve (which also includes some islands of the Luleå archipelago). The Döman reserve is about 25 kilometres (16 mi) south of Piteå town, covering the islands of Gråsjälen and Döman to the south of Jävre-Sandön.

== See also ==
- List of islands of the Piteå archipelago
