= Olof Bergqvist =

Swedish bishop

The Right Reverend Olof Bergqvist
- Bishop of Luleå
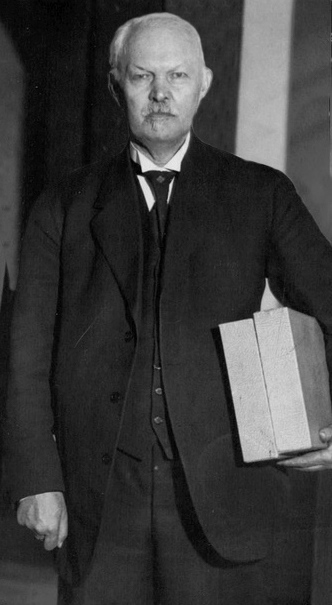
- Bishop Olof Bergqvist photographed in 1936
- Church: Church of Sweden
- Diocese: Luleå
- In office: 1904–1937
- Successor: Bengt Jonzon

Orders
- Ordination: 12 June 1892
- Consecration: 10 April 1904 by Martin Johansson

Personal details
- Born: 24 September 1862 Brunskog, Sweden
- Died: 20 October 1940 (aged 78) Luleå, Sweden
- Denomination: Lutheran

Olof Bergqvist (24 September 1862 – 20 October 1940) was a Swedish bishop. He was the first bishop in the Diocese of Luleå, serving in that office from 1904 to 1937. He is remembered in Sweden for a Pentecost hymn, of which he was the author, which is still popularly sung in churches.

== Church career ==
Bergqvist's family originated in the Värmland area, and he was ordained as a priest in Karlstad, the capital of Värmland, in 1892. In 1896 he became parish priest of the town of Gällivare in Lapland, then part of the Diocese of Härnösand. In 1904 the Diocese of Härnösand was divided, with the northern part (Lapland) becoming the new Diocese of Luleå, and Bergqvist was chosen as its first bishop. He was consecrated as bishop on 10 April 1904 by Martin Johansson, Bishop of Härnösand.

As Bishop of Luleå Bergqvist was responsible for the construction of new churches, and the development of an extended parochial and deanery system. He identified illiteracy as a significant issue amongst the laity of his See, and combated this by establishing a network of diocesan schools, together with training and study opportunities and networks for school teachers.

== Political activity ==
Bergqvist was politically active, and served as an elected County Councillor for more than twenty-five years, representing the Swedish National Party.

== Work with indigenous population ==
Bergqvist worked extensively with the indigenous Sami population of his diocese, and was a major contributor to the Church of Sweden's project to translate the New Testament scriptures into the Sami language. He was a fluent speaker of Swedish, Finnish, and Sami language.
