= Norrbottens Museum =

Museum in Luleå, Sweden

Norbottens Museum
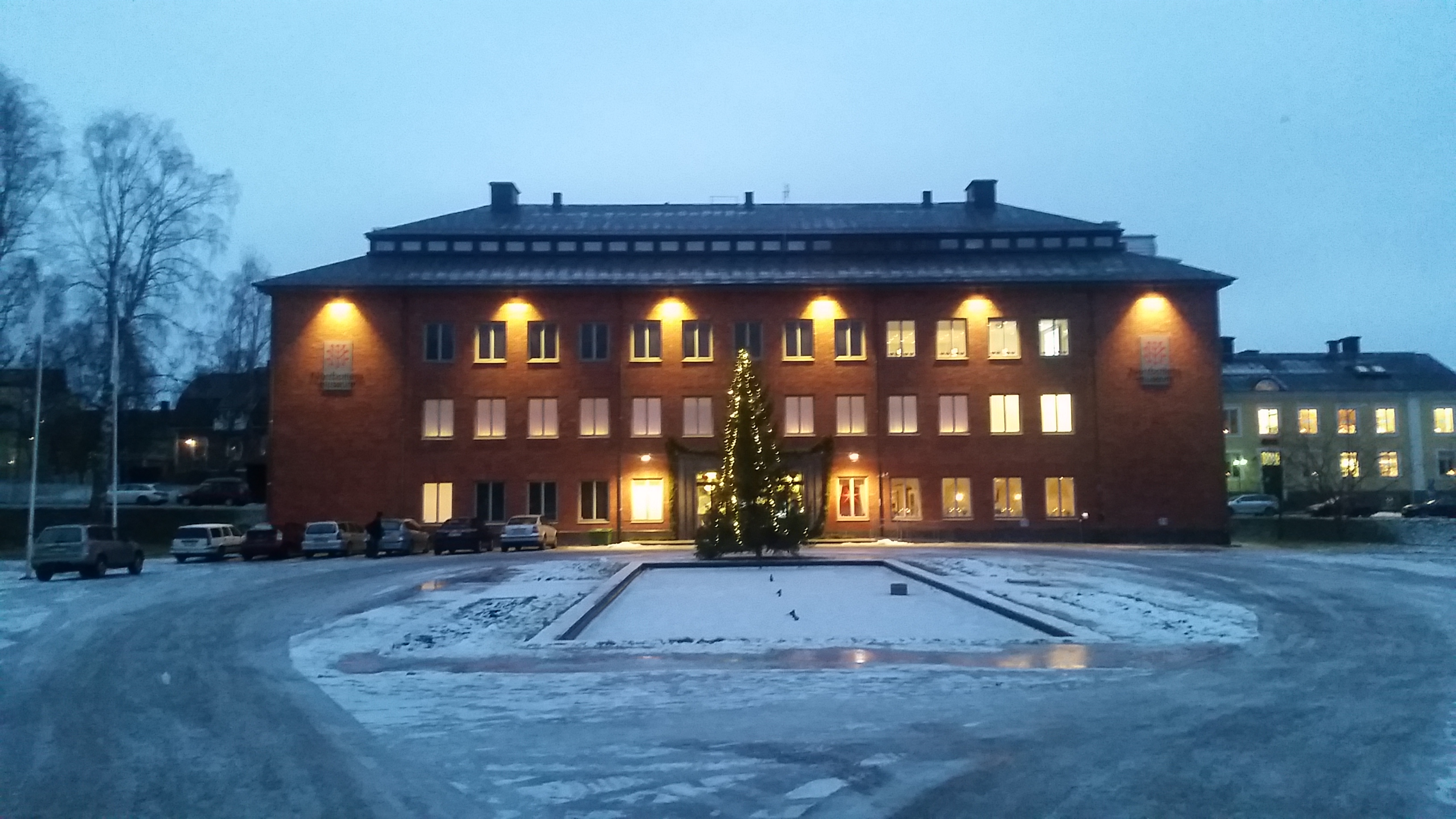
- Established: 20 September 1886
- Location: Luleå, Sweden
- Coordinates: 65.582167°N 22.138167°E
- Website: norrbottensmuseum.se

Norrbottens Museum is the county museum for Norrbotten County, Sweden, and is located in the Luleå city center with an associated archive and library in Björkskatan.

One of Sweden's 24 county museums, the Norrbottens Museum aims to preserve and transmit the cultural history of Norrbotten. Its collection includes archeology, ethnology, art, history, and culture. The museum covers the entire county, which covers a quarter of Sweden, and museum experts work throughout the region to help manage cultural projects, exhibitions, archaeological research and pedagogical activities.

The museum was founded in 1886, and has a large collection of images and objects associated with Norrbotten. The museum's image archive contains more than 2 million images. Many of the objects and photographs from the museum's collect can also be viewed online via its Carlotta database.

== History ==
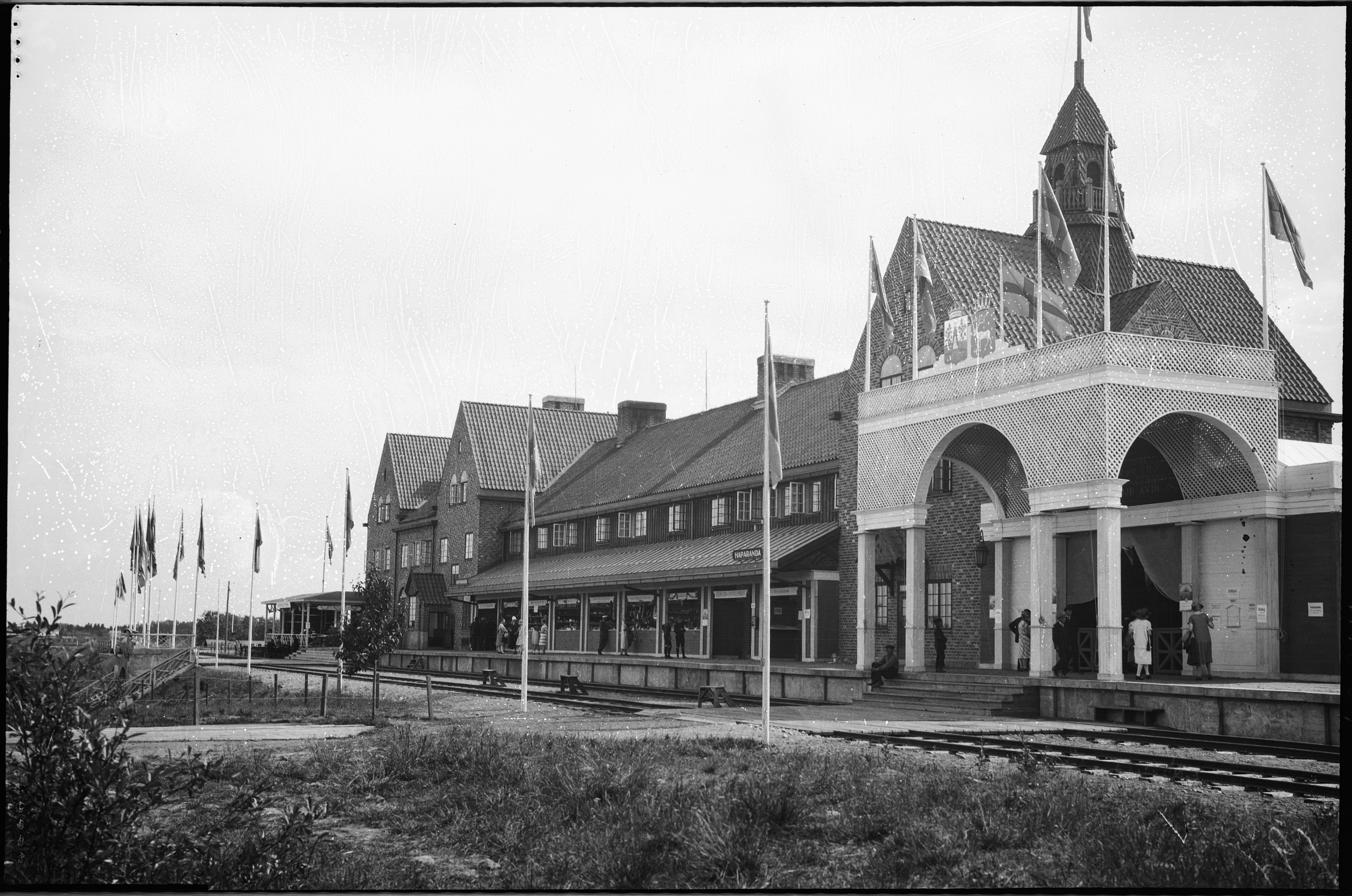

As early as 1878, J.A. Wikström, company manager for the New Gellivara Co. timber and mining company, began collecting and storing objects from Norrbotten. On 20 September 1886, city leaders in Luleå established the Norrbottens Museiförening to curate and expand the Gellivara collection into a full museum. The collection was initially housed in borrowed space, but in July 1936 the museum moved into a new dedicated building designed by the architect Eberhard Lovén.

Norrbottens Museum was a pioneer in pan-Scandinavian cooperation among museums, working as early as the late 1960s with the Tromsø Museum in Norway and the Northern Ostrobothnia Museum in Oulu, Finland, to mount joint exhibitions and tours. This effort led to the founding in the late 1970s of the Nordkalottmuseet (Arctic Museum of the Nordic Countries) cooperative effort.
