= Äppelknyckarjazz =

2008 studio album by Movits!

Studio album by Movits!
- Released: 26 November 2008
- Studio: BD Pop Studio
- Genre: Hip hop, swing, funk
- Length: 48:29
- Language: Swedish
- Label: BD Music

Movits! chronology
Äppelknyckarjazz (2008)	Ut ur min skalle (2011)

Singles from Äppelknyckarjazz
- 1. "Swing för hyresgästföreningen" Released: 2007; 2. "Äppelknyckarjazz" Released: 2008; 3. "Fel del av gården" Released: 2008

Äppelknyckarjazz (lit. 'apple scrumping jazz') is the debut studio album by Swedish hip hop swing band Movits!. The album was released on 26 November 2008 in Sweden and digitally on 29 July 2009 in the United States.

== Track listing ==
Äppelknyckarjazz track listing
No.	Title	Length
1.	"Ta på dig dansskorna"	3:41
2.	"Lite som"	1:10
3.	"Swing för hyresgästföreningen"	4:04
4.	"Fast tvärtom"	1:48
5.	"A-kasseblues"	4:18
6.	"Fel del av gården"	4:13
7.	"Epistel N:o 1"	3:16
8.	"Tom Jones" (feat Zacke)	4:38
9.	"Äppelknyckarjazz" (feat Mikael Wranell)	3:11
10.	"Stick iväg Jack del II"	2:02
11.	"Med två dollar på fickan" (feat Björn Sjöö)	3:09
12.	"Det vete fan"	2:56
13.	"Har du soul?"	3:14
14.	"Vals på Vinkelgränd"	6:42
Total length:		48:29

== Personnel ==
- Johan Rensfeldt – lyrics, lead vocals
- Anders Rensfeldt – lyrics, producer, guitar, banjo
- Joakim Nilsson – lyrics, saxophone
- Samuel Lundström – violin
- Kalle Nyman – double bass, harmonica
- Juan Mendoza – double bass
- Christer Ödberg – trumpet
- Björn Sjöö – trombone, bass tuba, accordion, piano, backing vocals
- David Lindgren – piano (track 5)
- Anders Niva – drums (track 1 and 5)
- Tomas Isacsson – electric organ
- Christofer Stannow – mastering engineer
- Ollie Olson – mixing engineer

== Charts ==
Charts	Peak position
Swedish Albums (Sverigetopplistan)	43
