= Lerbäcken =

- Residential area
- Interactive map of Lerbäcken
- Coordinates: 65°35′40″N 22°13′40″E
- Country: Sweden
- Province: Norrbotten
- County: Norrbotten County
- Municipality: Luleå Municipality

Population (2010)
  - Total: 1,082
- Time zone: UTC+1 (CET)
  - Summer (DST): UTC+2 (CEST)

Lerbäcken is a residential area in Luleå, Sweden. It had 1,082 inhabitants in 2010.
