= Martin Johansson (bishop) =

Swedish bishop

The Right Reverend Martin Johansson
- Bishop of Härnösand
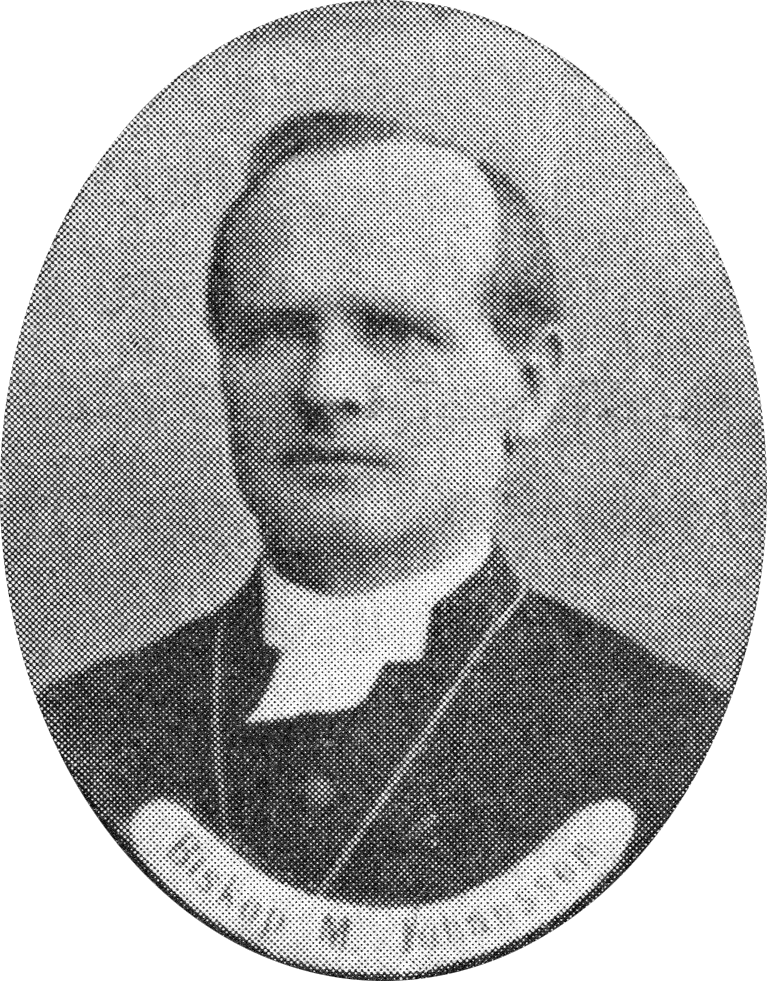
- Church: Church of Sweden
- Diocese: Härnösand
- In office: 1888–1908
- Predecessor: Lars Landgren
- Successor: Ernst Frithiof Lönegren

Orders
- Ordination: 1865
- Consecration: 11 November 1888 by Anton Niklas Sundberg

Personal details
- Born: 9 September 1837 Villstad, Jönköping County, Sweden
- Died: 26 June 1908 (aged 70) Härnösand, Västernorrland County, Sweden
- Buried: Uppsala old cemetery
- Denomination: Lutheran
- Parents: August Johansson & Brita Månsdotter
- Spouse: Vendela Magdalena Rappe

Martin Johansson (9 September 1837 – 26 June 1908) was a Swedish prelate who was the Bishop of Härnösand between 1888 and 1908.

== Early life and education ==
Johansson was born on 9 September 1837 in Villstad, Jönköping County, Sweden, the son of August Johansson, a school teacher and author, and Brita Månsdotter. He studied at Uppsala University and graduated in 1858. In 1863 he earned his PhD and in 1865 his Bachelor of Divinity, from the same university. He was ordained priest in 1865. The following year he was appointed Associate Professor of New Testament Exegesis at Uppsala University. Between 1866 and 1867 he studied abroad and later became an assistant professor in pastoral studies in 1870 . In 1877 he became professor of dogmatic and moral theology at the university. In 1877 Johansson also became a Doctor of Theology and in 1879 he was appointed member of the Bible Commission.

== Bishop ==
In 1888 Johansson was appointed Bishop of Härnösand and was consecrated on 11 November 1888 by Archbishop Anton Niklas Sundberg. Johansson was considered more aligned to the Low church tradition. He was also in favor of dividing the Diocese of Härnösand into two dioceses, something which occurred in 1904 when the Diocese of Luleå was created from part of the Diocese of Härnösand. Johansson died in Härnösand on 26 June 1908 and is buried at Uppsala old cemetery.
