= Mjölkudden =

- Residential area
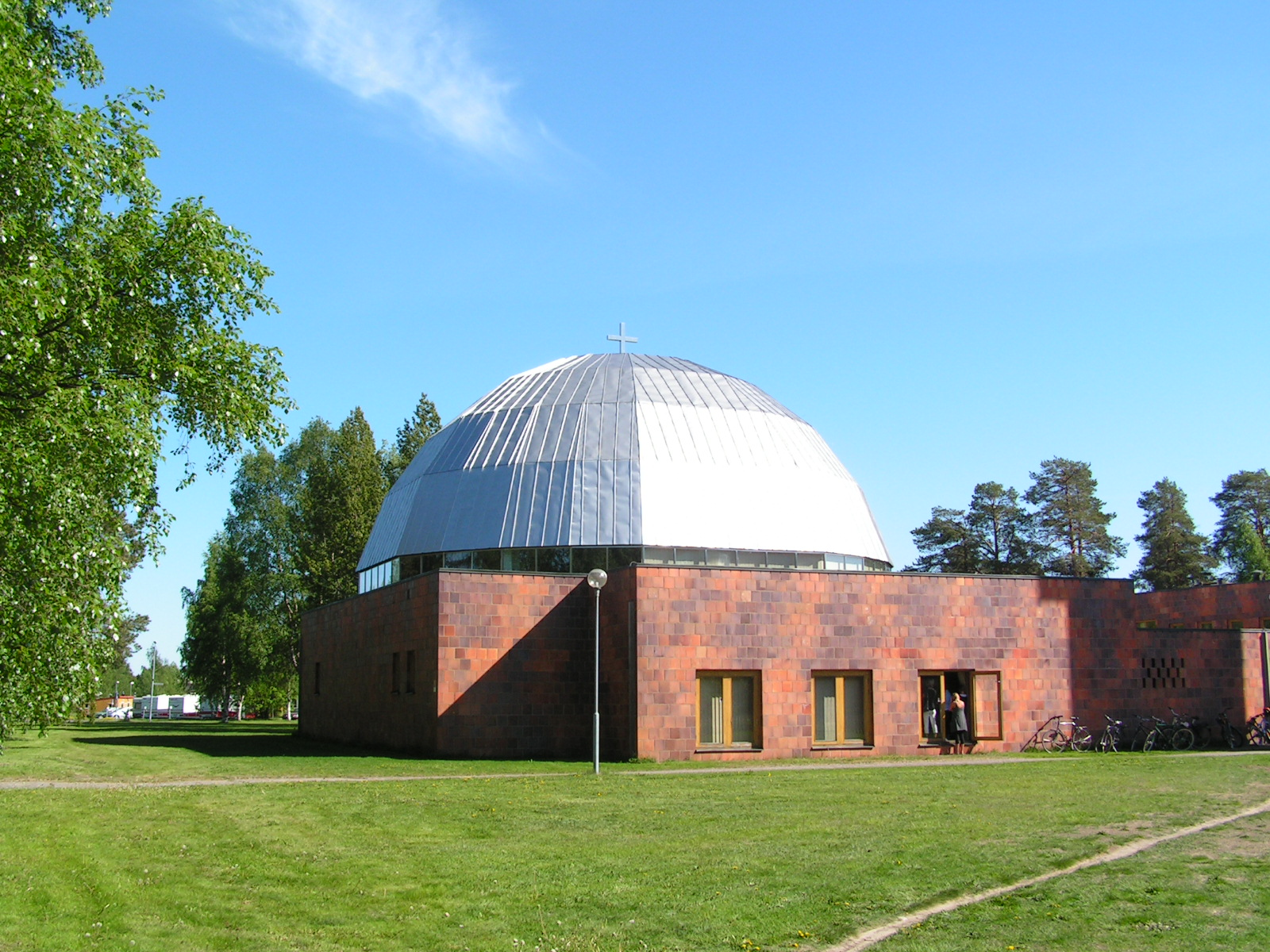
- Mjölkuddskyrkan
- Interactive map of Mjölkudden
- Coordinates: 65°36′00″N 22°07′30″E
- Country: Sweden
- Province: Norrbotten
- County: Norrbotten County
- Municipality: Luleå Municipality

Population (2010)
  - Total: 3,626
- Time zone: UTC+1 (CET)
  - Summer (DST): UTC+2 (CEST)

Mjölkudden is a residential area in Luleå, Sweden. It had 3,626 inhabitants in 2010.
