= Eva Nordung Byström =

Swedish bishop

The Right Reverend Eva Nordung Byström
- Bishop of Härnösand
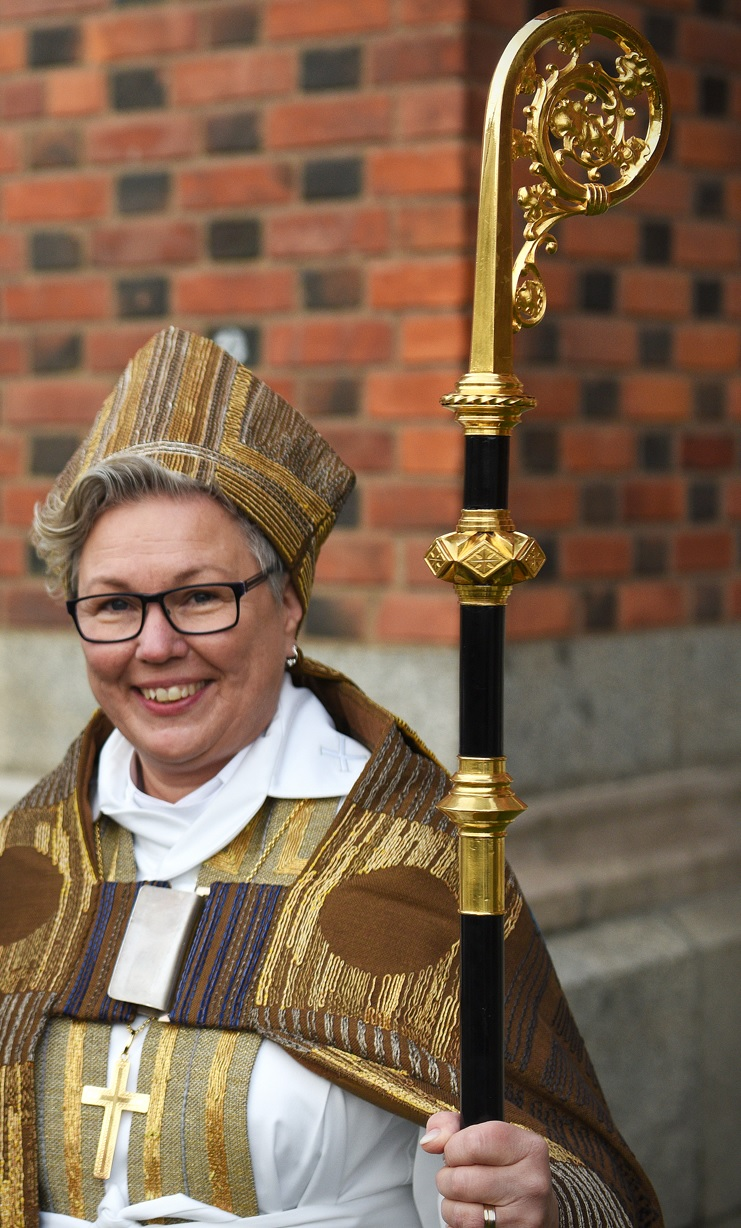
- Church: Church of Sweden
- Diocese: Härnösand
- Appointed: 2014
- Predecessor: Tuulikki Koivunen Bylund

Orders
- Ordination: 1984
- Consecration: 14 December 2014 by Antje Jackelén

Personal details
- Born: 21 April 1957 (age 69) Härnösand, Sweden
- Motto: Nu är Guds tid (Now is the time of God)
- Coat of arms

Eva Nordung Byström (born 21 April 1957 in Härnösand) is a Church of Sweden bishop of the Diocese of Härnösand.

Nordung Byström was ordained a priest in 1984. She was the vicar of Arnäs, Gideå and Trehörningsjö between 2004-2014 and of Örnsköldsvik between 2007 and 2014. She was consecrated and installed as the 26th bishop of Härnösand on 14 December 2014.
