= Malmudden =

- Residential area
- Interactive map of Malmudden
- Coordinates: 65°35′N 22°10′E
- Country: Sweden
- Province: Norrbotten
- County: Norrbotten County
- Municipality: Luleå Municipality

Population (2010)
  - Total: 981
- Time zone: UTC+1 (CET)
  - Summer (DST): UTC+2 (CEST)

Malmudden is a residential area in Luleå, Sweden.

== Geography ==
It is a beach-side community on the north coast of the Gulf of Bothnia, four kilometres northeast of central Luleå. It had 981 inhabitants in 2010.
