= Lövskatan =

- Residential area
- Interactive map of Lövskatan
- Coordinates: 65°34′33″N 22°11′36″E
- Country: Sweden
- Province: Norrbotten
- County: Norrbotten County
- Municipality: Luleå Municipality

Population (2010)
  - Total: 783
- Time zone: UTC+1 (CET)
  - Summer (DST): UTC+2 (CEST)

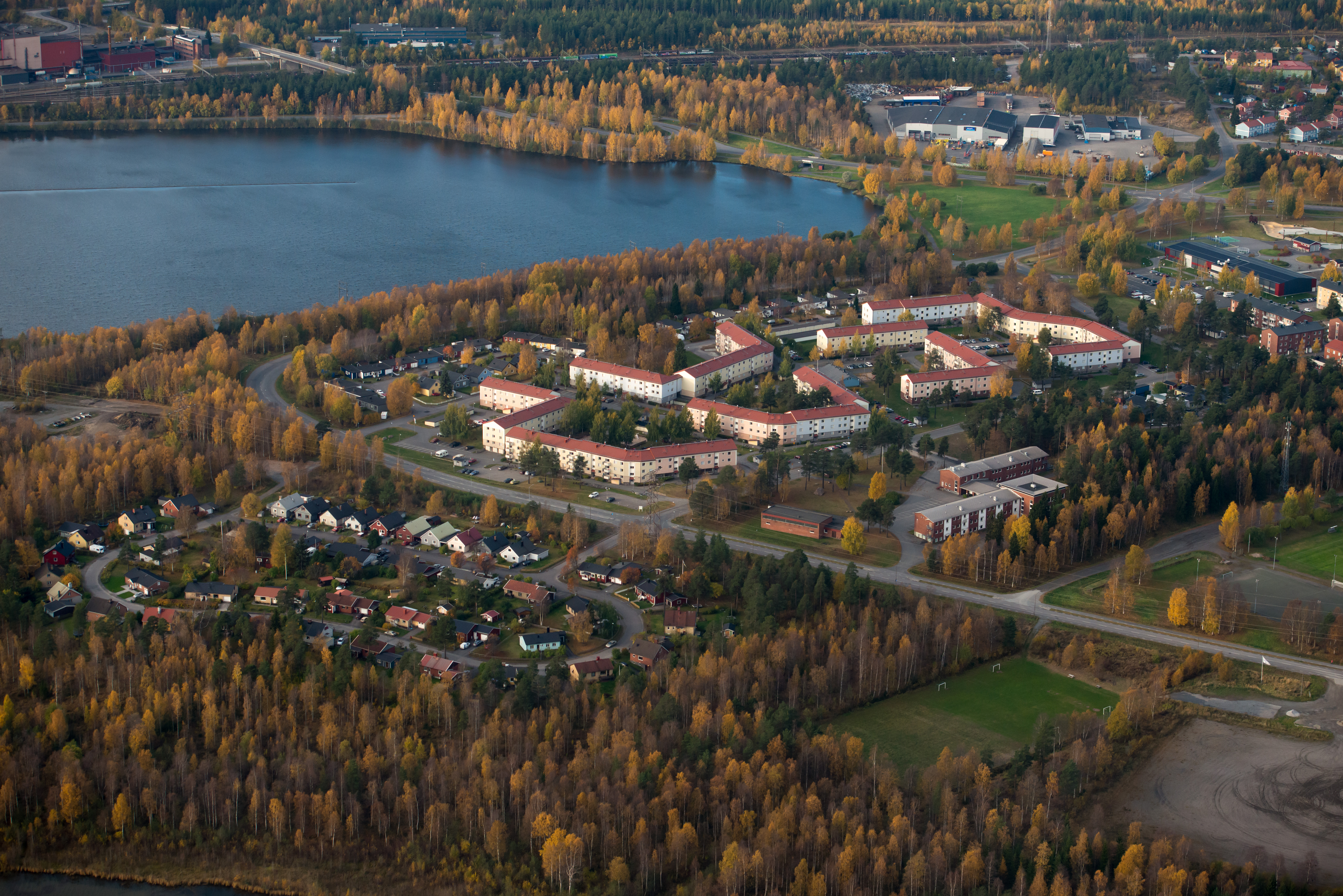

Lövskatan is a residential area in Luleå, Sweden. It had 783 inhabitants in 2010.
