= Stephan Gip =

Swedish designer and interior designer

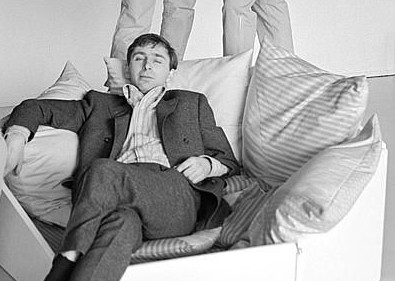
Stephan Gip sitting in a "P-stolen", 1967.

Stephan Gip (born 5 April 1936) is a Swedish designer and interior designer. He is best known for the furniture design called Robust in 1962.

== Early life ==
Stephan Gip was born in Luleå and graduated from Högre konstindustriella skolan (today known as Konstfack) in Stockholm in 1961 and his exam work was a children's furniture in beech tree. After graduation he started working for the company Skrivrit, creating designs for children's furniture for institutions, daycare centres, and pre-schools. Gip's ambition was to design furniture for children, not furniture in mini-formatted grown-up design. Along with Stina Sandels, he refined measurements for the furniture after they both did tests at Barnpsykologiska forskningslaboratiet in Kungsholmen in Stockholm. This resulted in the children's furniture line ”BA-serien,” which was produced for the NK warehouse in Stockholm. The furniture could be pushed into one another or stacked upon each other, and thereby required minimal space when not being used.

== Robust ==
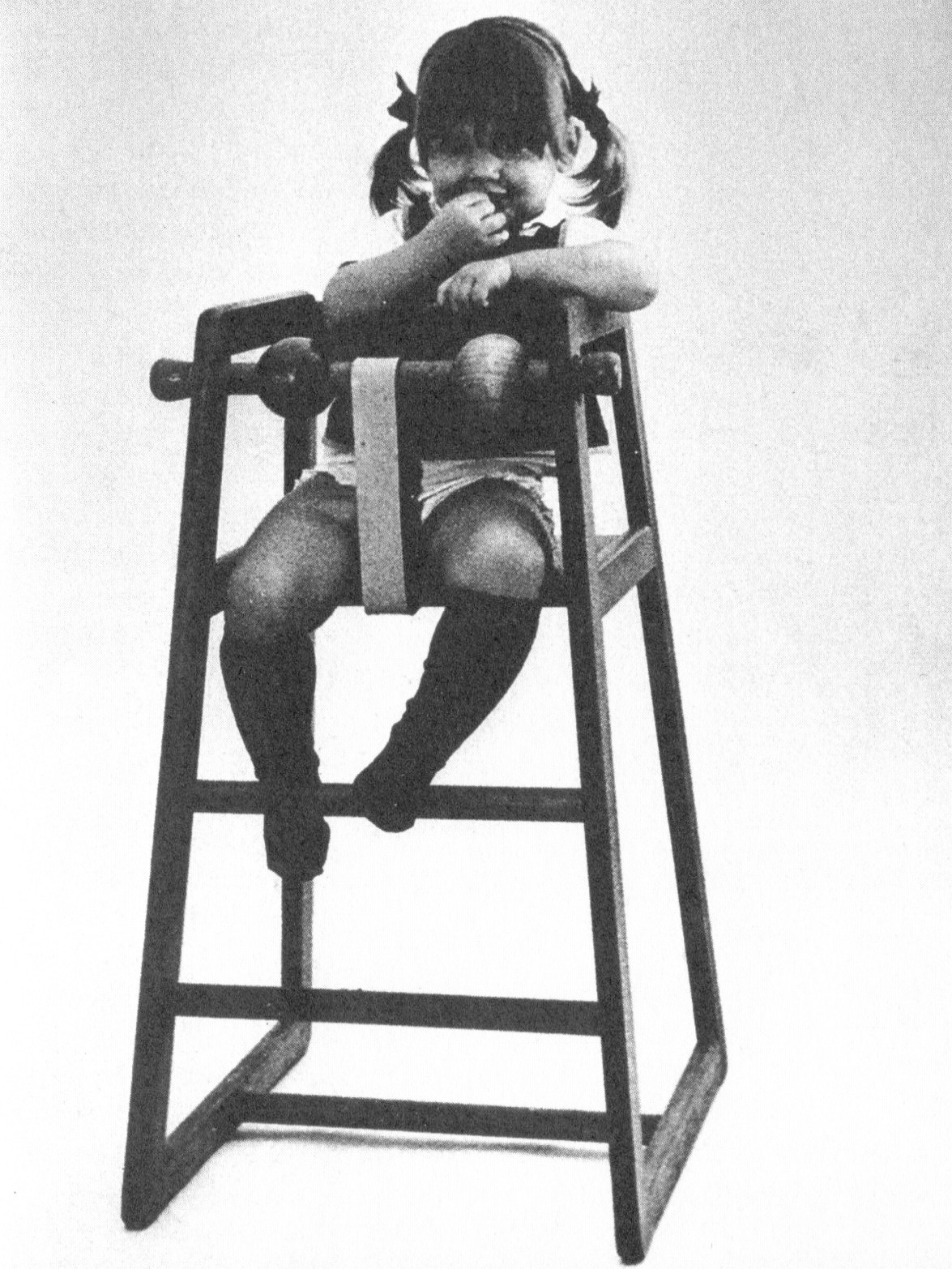
Children's chair "Robust" in 1962.

At the same time, Gip designed and created the children's high chair ”Robust”. The point with the design was that the child using the chair could sit at the same height as the parents at the dinner table, leading to the child being better able to be part of the family dinner and life. Robust was designed and created at the furniture company Gärsnäs AB in Gärsnäs. The chair got the typical round wooden staff with a big red and yellow board, and leather straps at the front so the child could not glide forward. The chair could be used by children up to the age of five; after the age of five it could still be used if the wooden staff and leather strap were removed. The Robust line also included low chairs and tables and a level-bed. The chair has over the years been adapted to the current styles of its time. As the name implies, the chair is robust and can manage pressure up to 70 kg, and can fall over without breaking. Since its creation the Robust chair has sold over 200,000 units.

== Blow-Up ==
In the mid 1960s, Gip presented a line of blow-up furniture under the name of ”Blow-Up”. It was produced in soft PVC at Hagaplast AB. The furniture could be inflated with the help of a vacuum cleaner or pump. In difference to Gip's Robust children's furniture, the Blow-Up line was a wear-and-tear kind of furniture, that was disposable when broken.

== Other furniture ==
Gip co-operated with Mo och Domsjö AB, launching a line of fiber furniture consisting of build-it yourself chairs and tables. The furnitures came in parts in flat cardboard boxes. They could easily be put together without screws, and were stabilized by cell-cartons. Along with Perstorp AB, Gip did the furniture line ”P-sängen,” a line for adults, and created a room within the room with a two-level bed in form of an octagon, with a surface of plastic laminate in bright colours. The bottom bunk was a place to play, and the upper bunk served as a double bed.

== Gallery ==
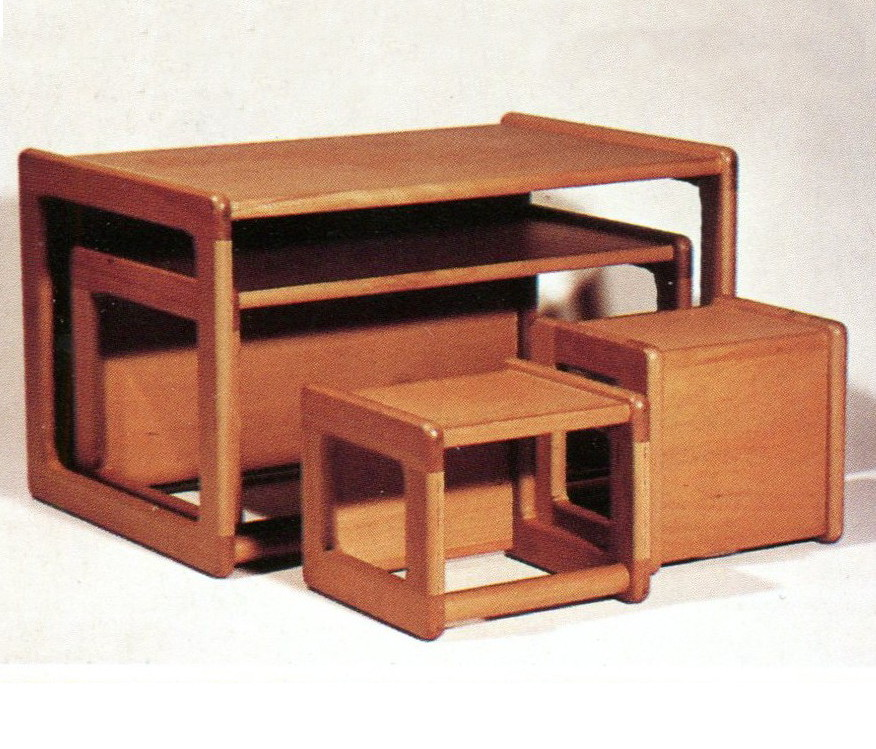
"BA-serien", 1962.

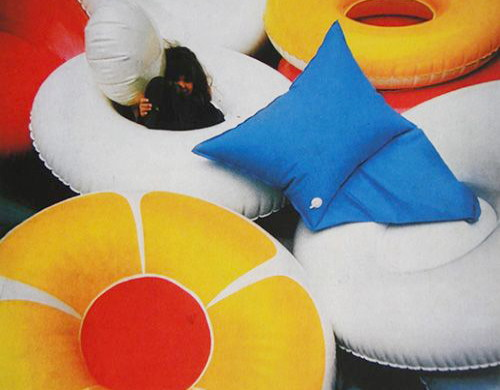
"Blow-Up", in the magazine Form 1967.

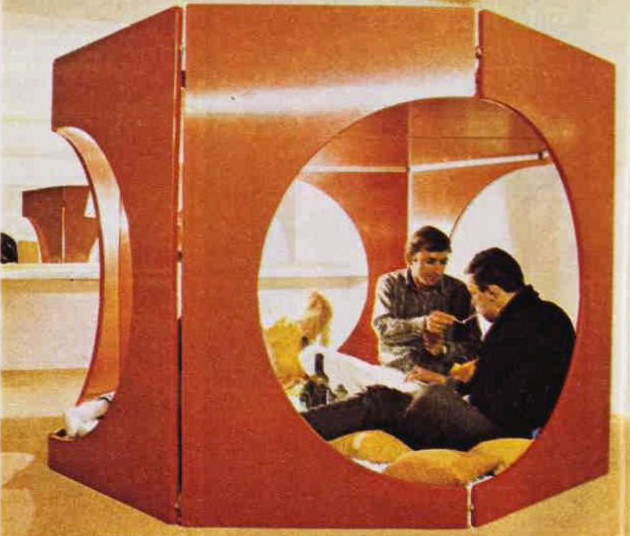
"P-sängen", 1968.

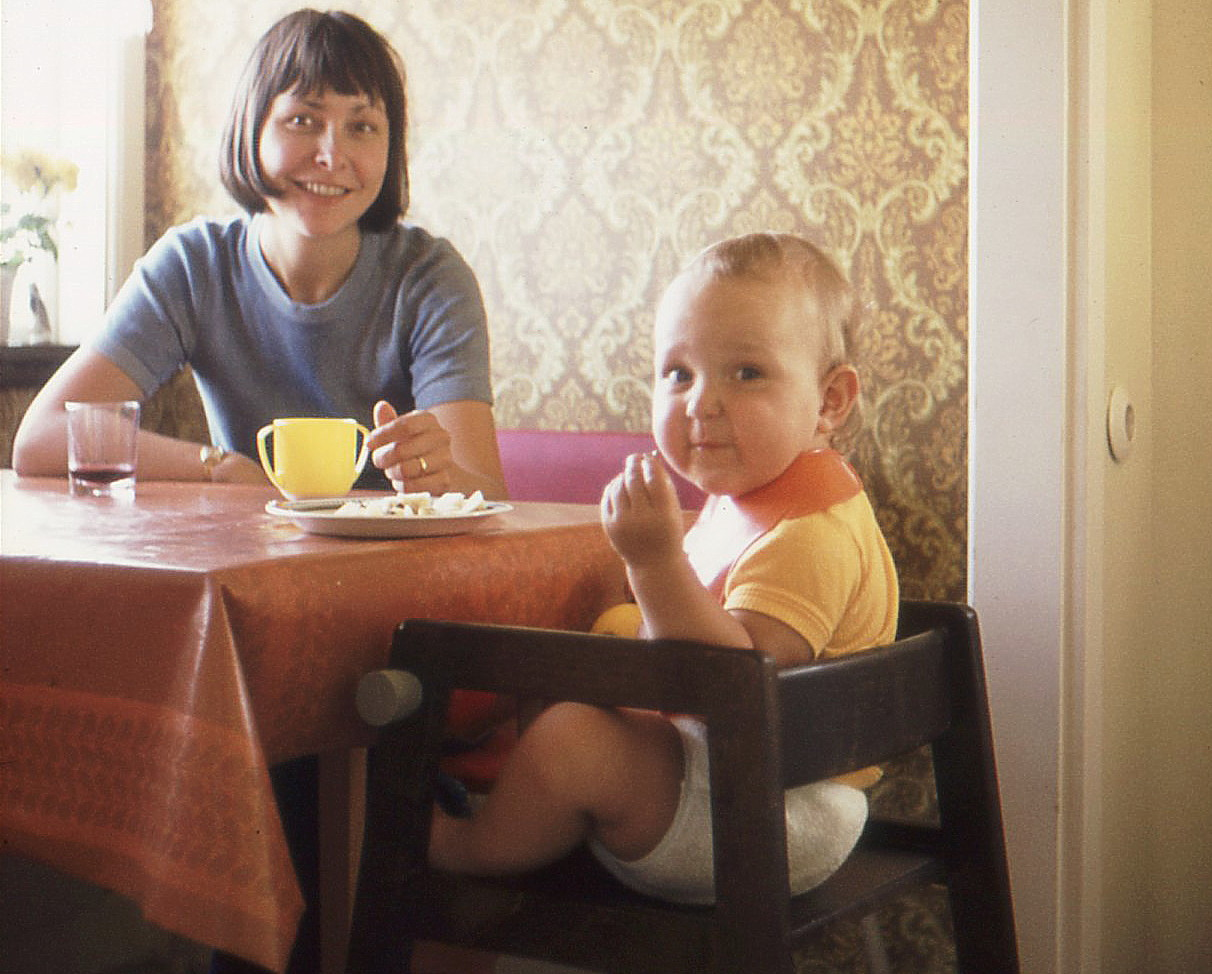
"Robust" in practical use, 1975.

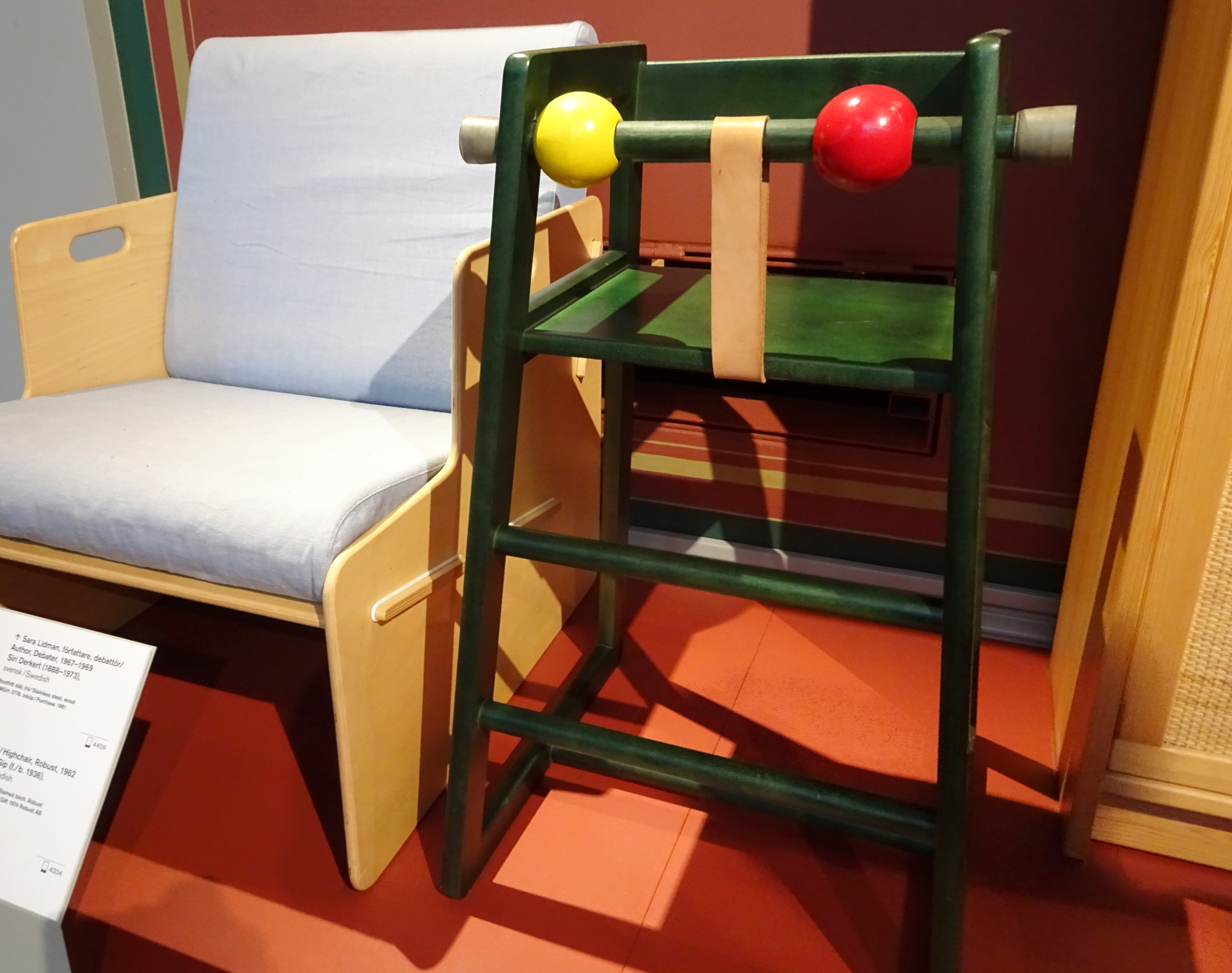
"Robust" at Nationalmuseum, 2018.
