= North Sweden European Office =

North Sweden European Office is the joint regional European Union liaison office for the Swedish counties Norrbotten and Västerbotten, the two northernmost counties of Sweden.

The main purpose of the office is to contribute and encourage Northern Sweden to become an active and competent region at a European level.

The founding organisations are the Municipalities, the County Councils, the County Administration Boards, the Federation of private enterprises and the Chambers of Commerce in Norrbotten and Västerbotten as well as Luleå University of Technology and Umeå University.

North Sweden European Office has an office in Brussels as well as an office in each county, located in Umeå and Luleå.
