= Bergviken =

- Residential area
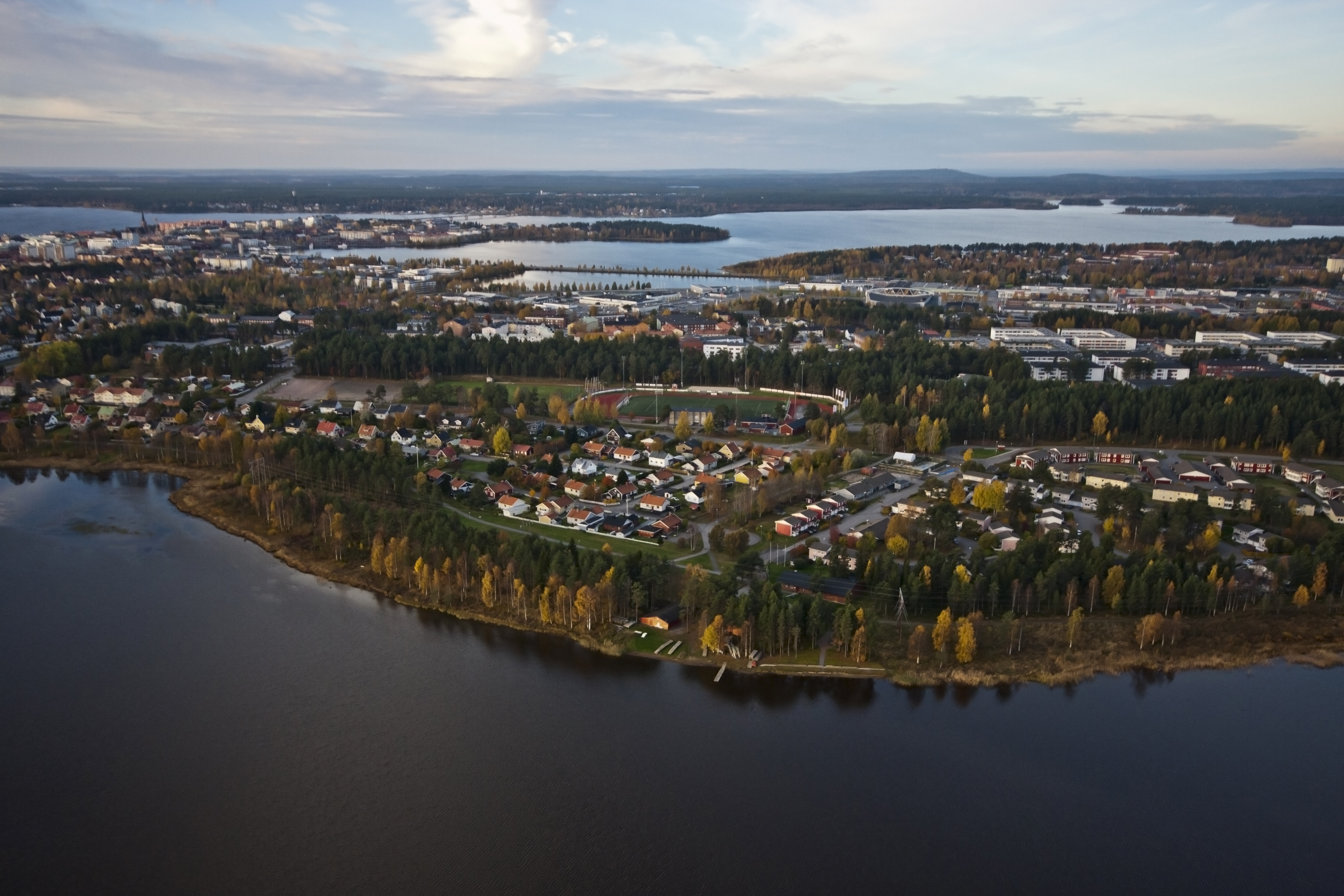
- Aerial photo of Bergviken
- Interactive map of Bergviken
- Coordinates: 65°35′50″N 22°09′25″E
- Country: Sweden
- Province: Norrbotten
- County: Norrbotten County
- Municipality: Luleå Municipality

Population (2010)
  - Total: 3,231
- Time zone: UTC+1 (CET)
  - Summer (DST): UTC+2 (CEST)

Bergviken is a residential area in Luleå, Sweden. It had 3,231 inhabitants in 2010.
