= Luleå Cathedral =

- Luleå domkyrka
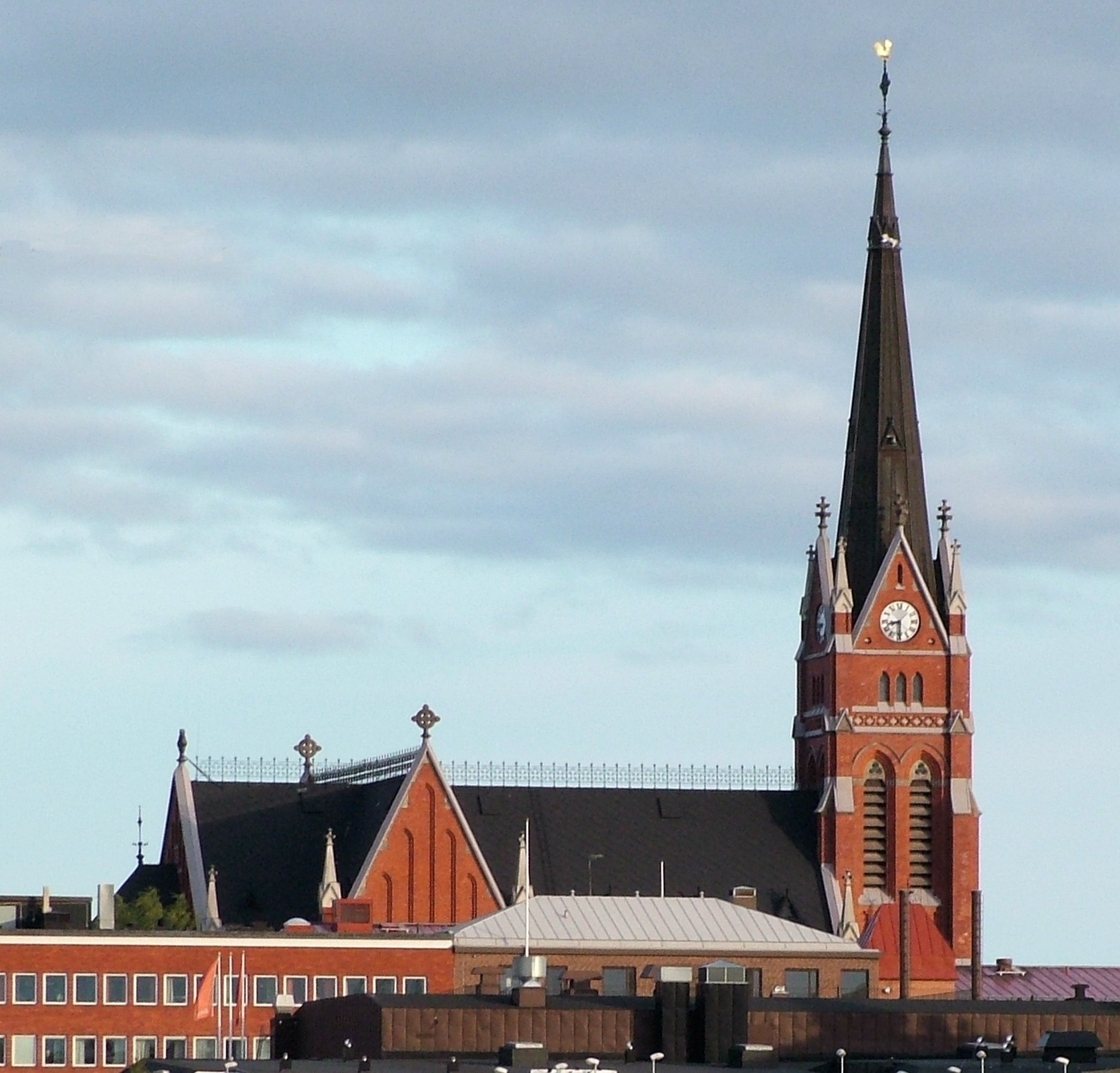
- Luleå Cathedral
- Luleå Cathedral
- 65°34′58″N 22°08′56″E
- Location: Luleå
- Country: Sweden
- Denomination: Church of Sweden
- Website: svenskakyrkan.se/luleadomkyrko

History
- Former name: Oscar Fredrik Church
- Status: Cathedral, Parish church
- Consecrated: 3 December 1893

Architecture
- Functional status: Active
- Style: Gothic Revival

Specifications
- Length: 54 m (177 ft)
- Width: 35 m (115 ft)
- Height: about 60 m (200 ft)

Administration
- Diocese: Diocese of Luleå
- Parish: Luleå Cathedral Parish

Clergy
- Bishop: Åsa Nyström

Luleå Cathedral (Swedish: Luleå domkyrka) in Luleå, Sweden, serves the Diocese of Luleå and the local Church of Sweden parish, Luleå Cathedral Parish (Luleå domkyrkoförsamling).

== History ==
There were a total of two churches built on the site of the current cathedral. In 1667 the original wooden church was demolished and a stone church was built instead. However, on 11 June 1887, the church burned to the ground. Two years later, the church council decided to rebuild the church and on 11 June 1889, the cornerstone was laid. The church was built on the designs of Adolf Emil Melander. It was consecrated on 3 December 1893, which was First Advent Sunday that year., The church was originally named Oscar Fredrik Church (Oscar Fredriks kyrka), after the King Oscar (Fredrik) II. It became a cathedral when the Diocese of Luleå was created in 1904.

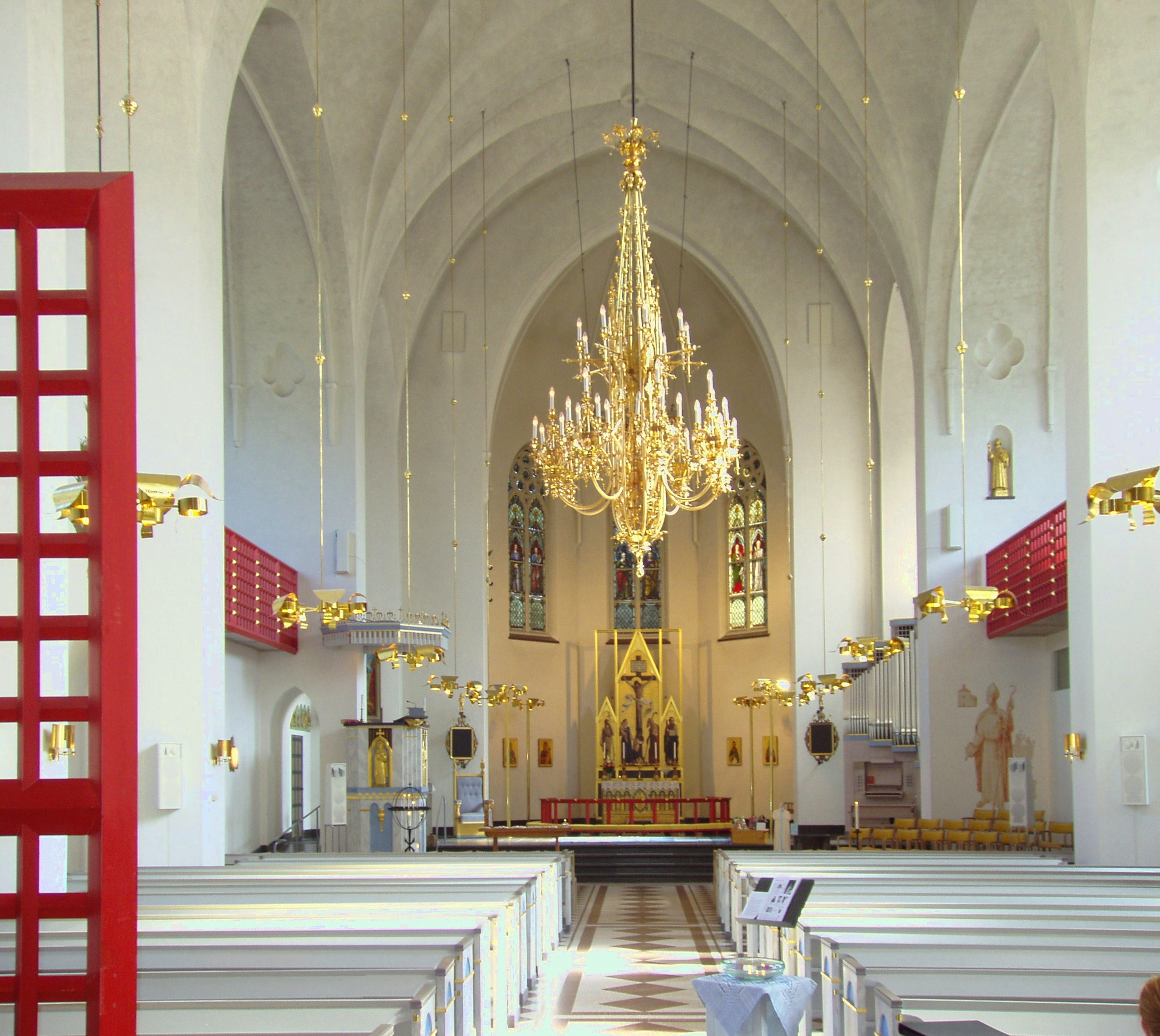
Interior of the Cathedral

== Organ ==
The organ, which was inaugurated in 1987, is built by Grönlund organ builders in Gammelstaden. It weighs 25 tons and has 4595 pipes. The organ was expanded in 2010 with French-inspired En chamade. The facade was designed by Jan Boström in collaboration with the architect Bertil Fraklin.
