= Zacke =

Swedish rapper

Zacke Zakarias Lekberg
- Born: August 9, 1983 (age 43); Stockholm
- Genre: Rap/Hip hop
- Years active: 2003–present
- Label: Bad Taste Records Goldenbest Records Academy of Fine Arts
- Website: www.zackemusik.se

Zakarias Lekberg, better known as Zacke, is a Swedish rapper from Luleå in northern Sweden.

== Early life ==
Zacke was born in Stockholm, Sweden. His mother is Swedish and his father is from Morocco. After his parents' break up, he and his mother moved to Luleå while he was still just a few years old.

== Music career ==
Zacke released his first EP Var här in 2003 and followed that with his second EP Färdighaft which was produced by Emil Pettersson in 2004. Both of his EPs received good comments from critics and the track Anna på glej from his second EP was played on P3 for a while in 2004.

In 2010, he released his first real album Visst är det vackert and it was a major hit and was praised by almost every reviewer. The album won the prize “Best hiphop” at Manifestgalan in 2011.

In February 2013, Zacke released his second and his latest full-length solo album Renhjärtat. Just like his previous album Renhjärtat gained good critics and Swedish music papers like Kingsize Magazine gave it 4 out of 5. Throughout his whole career Zacke has collaborated and made songs with some of Sweden's biggest artists such as Movits, Mattias Alkberg, Oskar Linnros, Timbuktu and Alexander Juneblad. His close work with the group Movits (also from Luleå) led to a new group called Alaska started by Zacke and Johan Rensfeldt from Movits. The idea of the group was to make music that they did not think fitted their two main projects (Movits and Zacke). The duo's first album Alaska was released in the summer of 2014. Both Visst är det vackert and Renhjärtat were produced by Anders Rensfeldt from Movits.

Critics have praised Zacke ever since his first release in 2003 for his way of expressing himself throughout his lyrics.

== Discography ==
=== Albums ===
- 2003 – Var här (EP)
- 2004 – Färdighaft (EP)
- 2010 – Visst är det vackert
- 2013 – Renhjärtat
- 2014 – Alaska (with Alaska)
- 2016 – Fattigkussen
- 2020 - Pengar. Frihet. Zakaria Jamal.

=== Singles ===
- 2008 – BS
- 2009 – Öppet idag
- 2009 – Förlorad generation
- 2009 – Spela mig på radion
- 2010 – 1000-0 till idioterna
- 2012 – Mammas nya kille
- 2012 – Utomlands
- 2012 – En skata flög
- 2012 – Minicall
- 2013 – Halvvägs
- 2015 – Det börjar med mig (with Fatta man)
- 2020 – Ge dom allt
- 2020 – Solsidan
- 2020 – 100 mil (feat. Movits!)
- 2020 – Kommer Hem (feat. Parham)
