= Skurholmen =

- Residential area
- Interactive map of Skurholmen
- Coordinates: 65°35′10″N 22°11′50″E
- Country: Sweden
- Province: Norrbotten
- County: Norrbotten County
- Municipality: Luleå Municipality

Population (2010)
  - Total: 4,492
- Time zone: UTC+1 (CET)
  - Summer (DST): UTC+2 (CEST)

Skurholmen is a residential area in Luleå, Sweden. It had 4,492 inhabitants in 2010.
