= Diocese of Härnösand =

Diocese of Härnösand Diocesis Hernosandiensis Härnösands stift
- Arms of the diocese of Härnösand

- Flag

Location
- Country: Sweden
- Deaneries: 10 kontrakt
- Coordinates: 62°37′52″N 17°56′30″E

Statistics
- Parishes: 52
- Congregations: 104

Information
- Denomination: Church of Sweden
- Established: 1647
- Cathedral: Härnösand Cathedral

Current leadership
- Bishop: Eva Nordung Byström
- Metropolitan Archbishop: Antje Jackelén

Map

Website
- svenskakyrkan.se/harnosandsstift

The Diocese of Härnösand (Swedish: Härnösands stift) is a division in the Church of Sweden in Västernorrland County. The Cathedral is located at Trädgårdsgatan in Härnösand.

== History ==
The diocese was established in 1647. In 1904, the diocese of Luleå was formed, breaking away from the diocese of Härnösand.

Between 1994-2004, several churches of the diocese experienced a series of thefts.

== Parishes ==
The diocese is divided into 10 deaneries with 113 parishes, these among others:

- Anundsjö
- Åre
- Härnösand
- Offerdal
- Örnsköldsvik
- Östersund
- Sidensjö
- Sollefteå
- Tännäs
- Torsåker
- Ytterlännäs

== Bishops ==
- Petri Erici Steuchius (1647-1683)
- Mathias Steuchius (1683-1694)
- Julius Micrander (1695-1702)
- Georgius Nicolai Wallin (1703–1723)
- Petrus Jonæ Asp (1723–1726)
- Nicolaus Sternell (1728–1744)
- Olof Kiörning (1746–1778)
- Eric Hesselgren (1779–1803)
- Carl Gustaf Nordin (1805–1812)
- Erik Abraham Almquist (1814–1830)
- Frans Michael Franzén (1832–1847)
- Israel Bergman (1848–1864)
- Anders Fredrik Beckman (1865–1875)
- Lars Landgren (1876–1888)
- Martin Johansson (1888–1908)
- Ernst Frithiof Lönegren (1910–1934)
- Torsten Bohlin (1935–1950)
- Gunnar Hultgren (1951–1958)
- Ruben Josefson (1958–1967)
- Arne Palmqvist (1967–1975)
- Bertil Werkström (1975–1983)
- Bengt G. Hallgren (1983–1991)
- Karl-Johan Tyrberg (1991–2001)
- Tony Guldbrandzén (2001–2009)
- Tuulikki Koivunen Bylund (2009–2014)
- Eva Nordung Byström (2014–present)
