= Tuulikki Koivunen Bylund =

Finnish-born Swedish theologian (born 1947)

The Right Reverend Tuulikki Koivunen Bylund
- Bishop Emerita of Härnösand
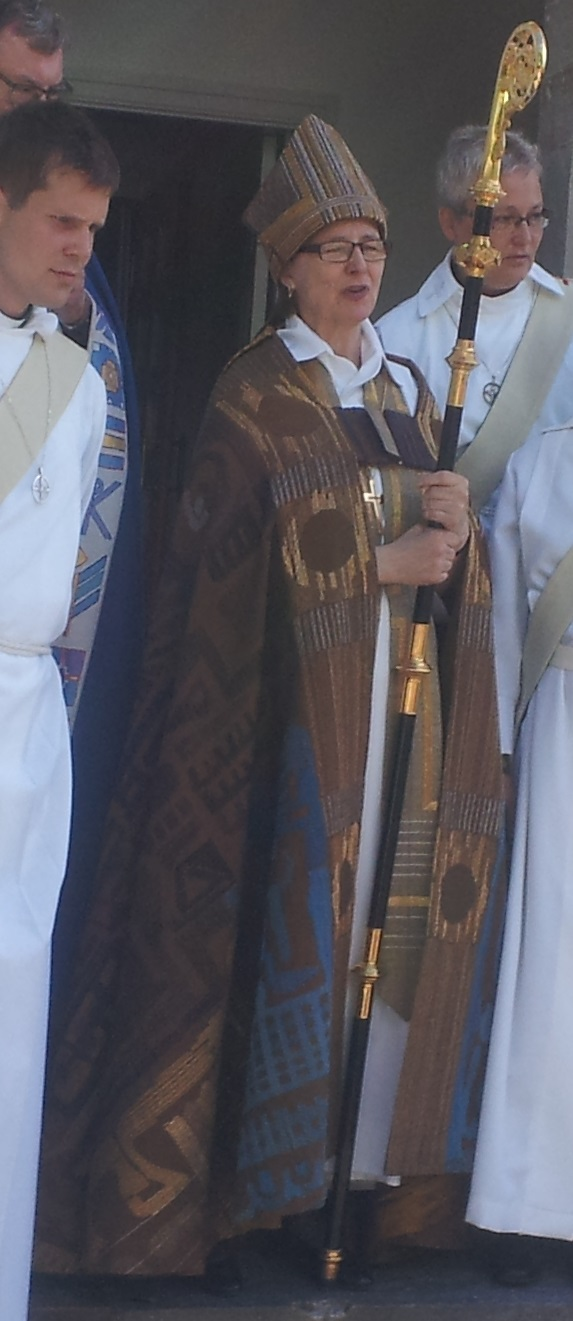
- Church: Church of Sweden
- Diocese: Härnösand
- Elected: 8 April 2009
- In office: 2009–2014
- Predecessor: Tony Guldbrandzén
- Successor: Eva Nordung Byström

Orders
- Ordination: 23 October 1971 by Olle Nivenius
- Consecration: 8 November 2009 by Anders Wejryd

Personal details
- Born: Maritta Tuulikki Koivunen; July 19, 1947 (age 79) Turku, Finland
- Denomination: Lutheran
- Education: Åbo Akademi; Uppsala University
- Motto: Charitas foras mittit timorem (Love casts out fear)

Maritta Tuulikki Koivunen Bylund (born 19 July 1947) is a Finnish-Swedish theologian. She was appointed Bishop of Härnösand in central Sweden on 8 November 2009; she was the fourth woman to be ordained as a bishop in the Church of Sweden. She retired on 13 December 2014.

== Biography ==
Koivunen Bylund was born on 19 July 1947 in Turku, south-western Finland, and grew up in Rauma where she matriculated from the girls' high school (Rauman tyttölyseo) in 1967. After graduating in theology from Åbo Akademi University in 1971, she was ordained a priest in the Diocese of Lund, Sweden, in the same year. She had emigrated to Sweden because at the time it was not possible for women to enter the clergy in Finland. The churches of Finland and Sweden differed significantly in their admission of women to the clergy.

In 1973, she became the principal diocesan curate in Lund, gaining a similar position in Växjö the following year. She served as a deputy pastor in Bro Parish, Upplands-Bro, in the Diocese of Uppsala, from 1976. In 1983 she became a student pastor at Uppsala University, and in 1987 an assistant pastor at Uppsala Cathedral and parish priest for the Almtuna district. She was appointed Dean of Uppsala Cathedral in 1995 before becoming Bishop of Härnösand in 2009. The consecration ceremony took place in Uppsala Cathedral. At the same occasion, Eva Brunne was consecrated Bishop of Stockholm.

Koivunen Bylund became a Doctor of Theology at Uppsala University in 1994. Her doctoral dissertation, with the title ”Frukta icke, allenast tro”: Ebba Boström och Samariterhemmet 1882–1902 (“Fear not, believe only”: Ebba Boström and the Samaritan Home, 1882–1902) is an interdisciplinary work within women's history and practical theology, which investigates the history of the charitable institution Samariterhemmet in Uppsala.
