= Luleå =

Place in Norrbotten, Sweden

Luleå Luleju Luulaja
- City
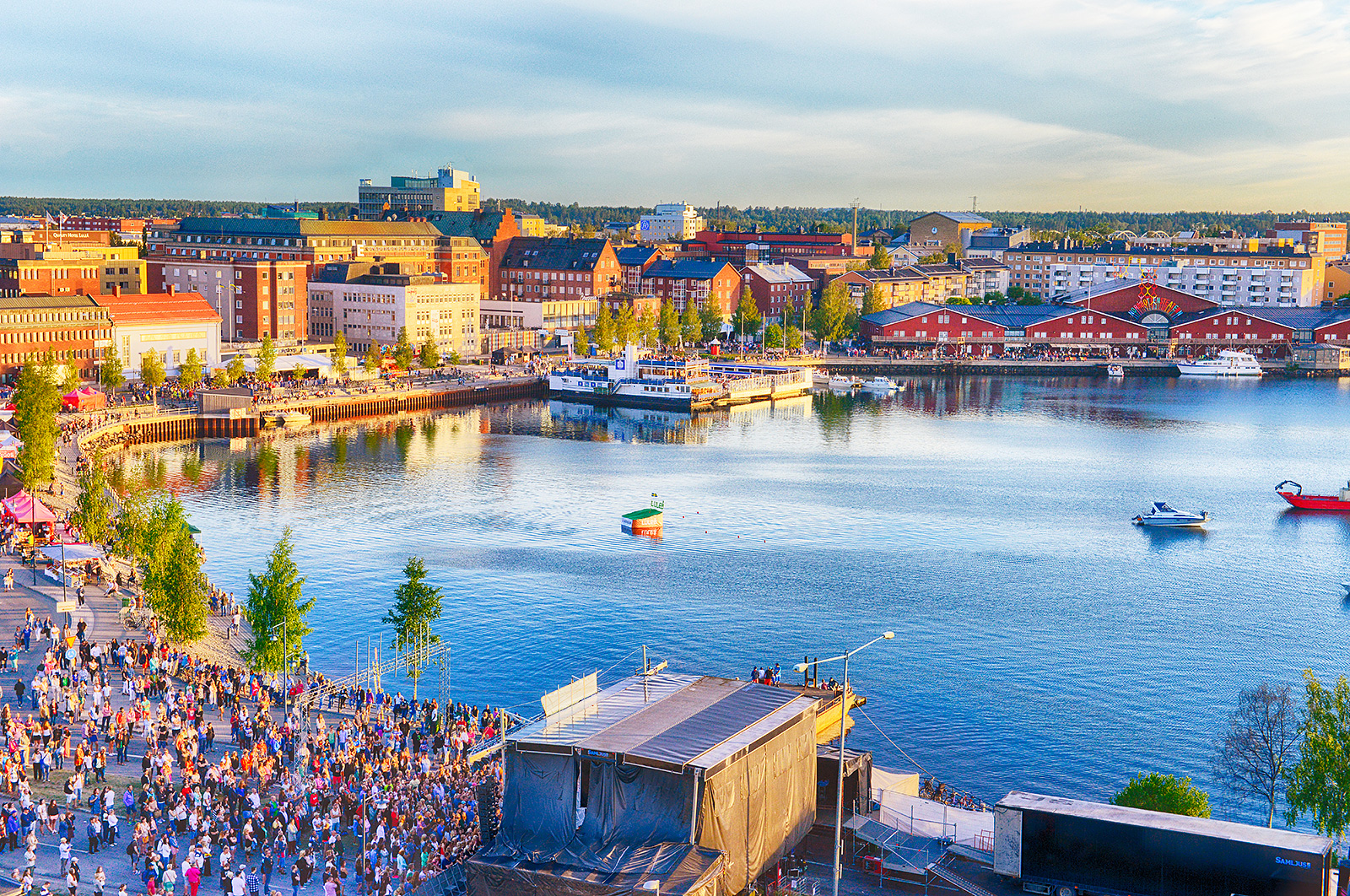
- Luleå, 2014

- Location within Norrbotten Location within Sweden
- Coordinates: 65°35′4″N 22°9′14″E
- Country: Sweden
- Province: Norrbotten
- County: Norrbotten County
- Municipality: Luleå Municipality
- Charter: 17th century

Area
  - City: 29.09 km^{2} (11.23 sq mi)
- Elevation: 6 m (20 ft)

Population (31 December 2018)
  - Metro: 77,832
- Time zone: UTC+1 (CET)
  - Summer (DST): UTC+2 (CEST)
- Postal code: 971 00 – 978 20
- Area code: (+46) 920
- Website: www.lulea.se

Luleå (/ˈluːleɪoʊ/ LOO-lay-oh, Swedish: [ˈlʉ̌ːlɛɔ], locally [ˈlʉ̌ːlɛ]; Lule Sami: Luleju; Finnish and Meänkieli: Luulaja) is a city on the coast of northern Sweden, and the capital of Norrbotten County, the northernmost county in Sweden. Luleå has 48,728 inhabitants in its urban core as of 2018 and is the seat of Luleå Municipality with a total population of about 80,000 as of 2025. Luleå is Sweden's 25th largest city and Norrbotten County's largest city. Luleå is considered as the world's largest brackish water archipelago with 1,312 islands, several rivers and vast forestland.

Luleå has the seventh biggest harbour in Sweden for shipping goods. It has a large steel industry and is a centre for extensive research. It is also home to the Swedish Air Force Wing Norrbotten Wing (F 21) based in Luleå Airport. Luleå University of Technology is one of Sweden's three technology universities with around 15,000 students and is the northernmost university in Sweden.

== History ==
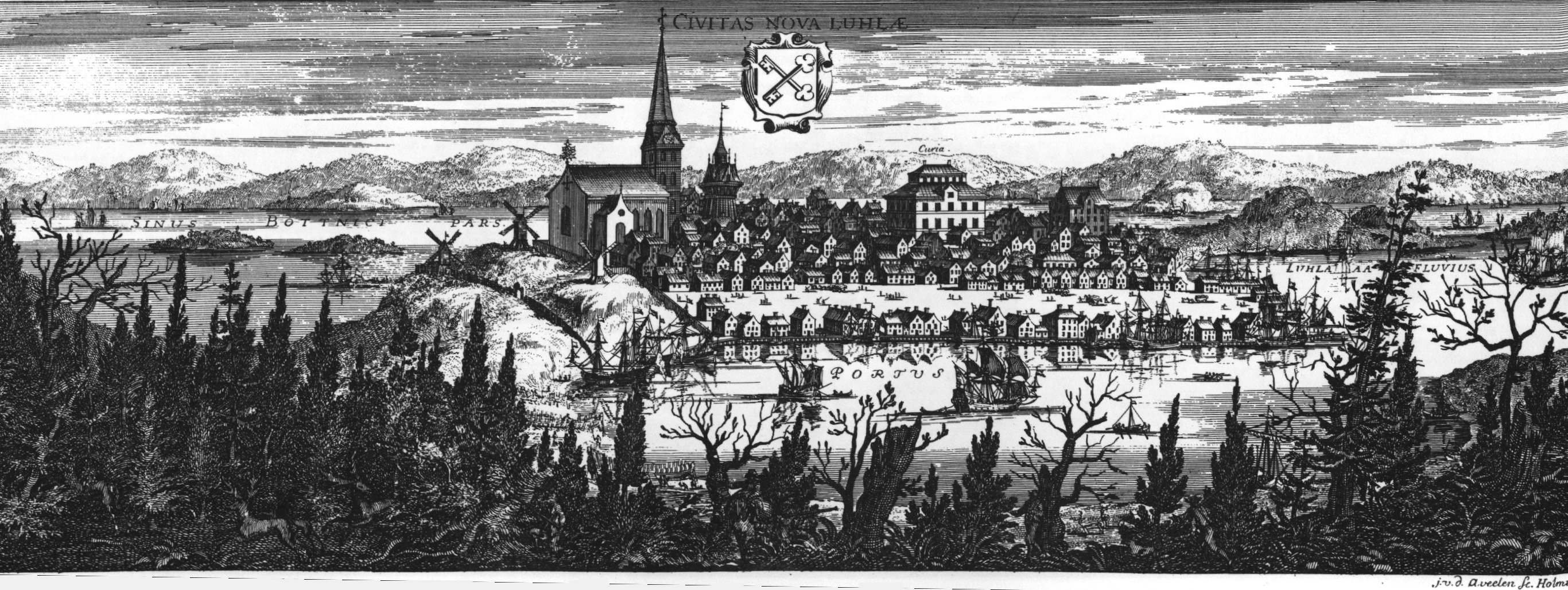
An engraving of Luleå New Town from Suecia Antiqua et Hodierna. The most prominent buildings are the church and the town hall.

The town's Royal charter was granted in 1621 by King Gustavus Adolphus of Sweden. The original town was situated where Gammelstad (Old Town) is situated today. The town had to be moved in 1649 to the current site, due to the post-glacial rebound that had made the bay too shallow for ships to enter.

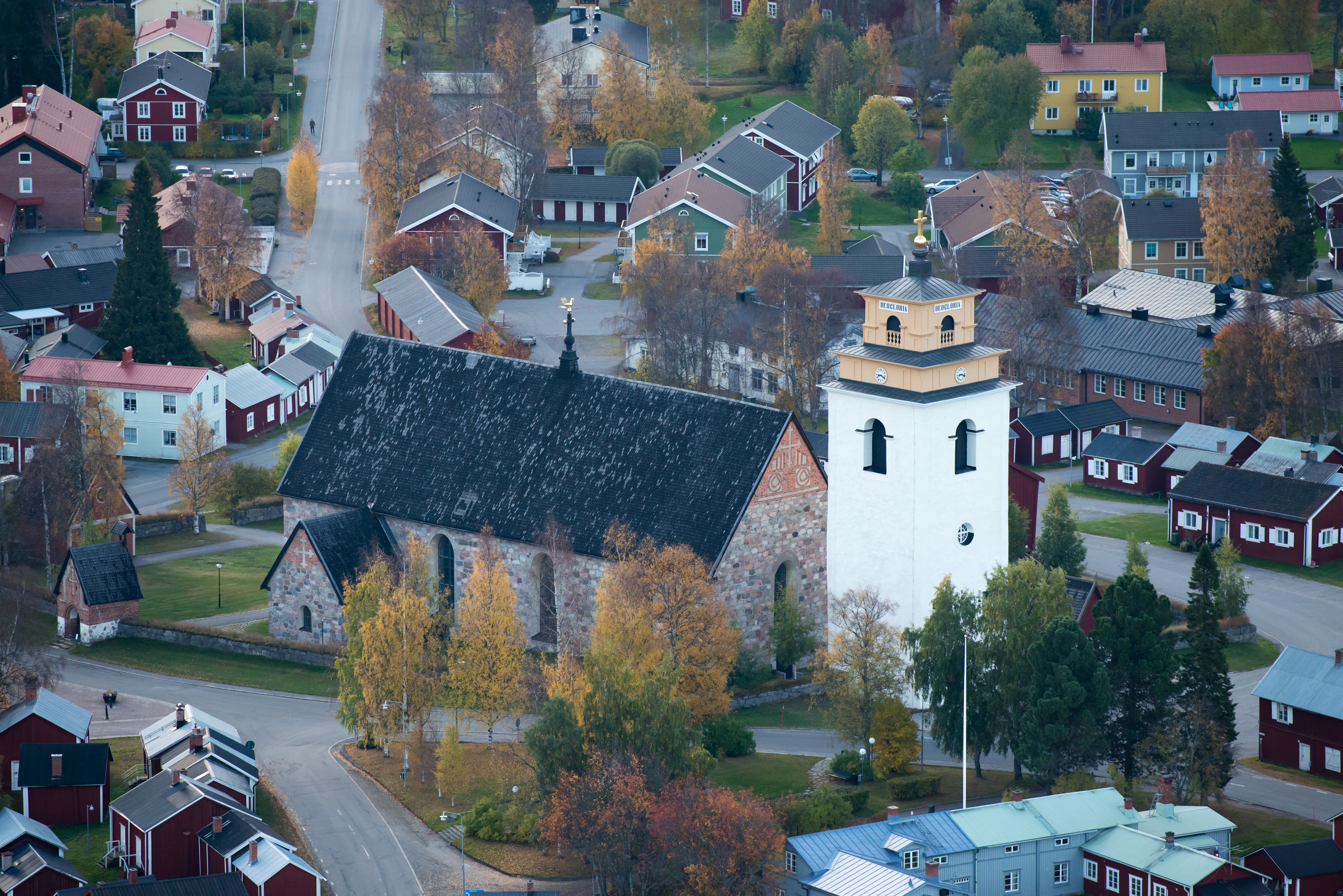
The Gammelstad church

In 1805, Luleå only had 947 inhabitants, but in 1865 Luleå succeeded Piteå as the county town in Norrbotten county and now had around 1400 residents. In the 1860s, the industries also started taking root in the city.

The town was plagued by fires in 1653, 1657 and 1887, and the fire in 1887 was a devastating fire that destroyed most of the town, sparing only a few buildings. The Neo-Gothic Cathedral (originally the Oscar Fredrik church), dedicated in 1893, standing at 67 meters (220 ft), is the tallest building in town.

== Geography ==
=== Residential areas ===
- Bergviken
- Björkskatan
- Centrum
- Hertsön
- Kronan
- Lerbäcken
- Lulsundet
- Lövskatan
- Malmudden
- Mjölkudden
- Notviken
- Porsön
- Skurholmen
- Svartöstaden
- Örnäset
- Östermalm

=== Localities ===
- Bergnäset
- Gammelstaden
- Karlsvik

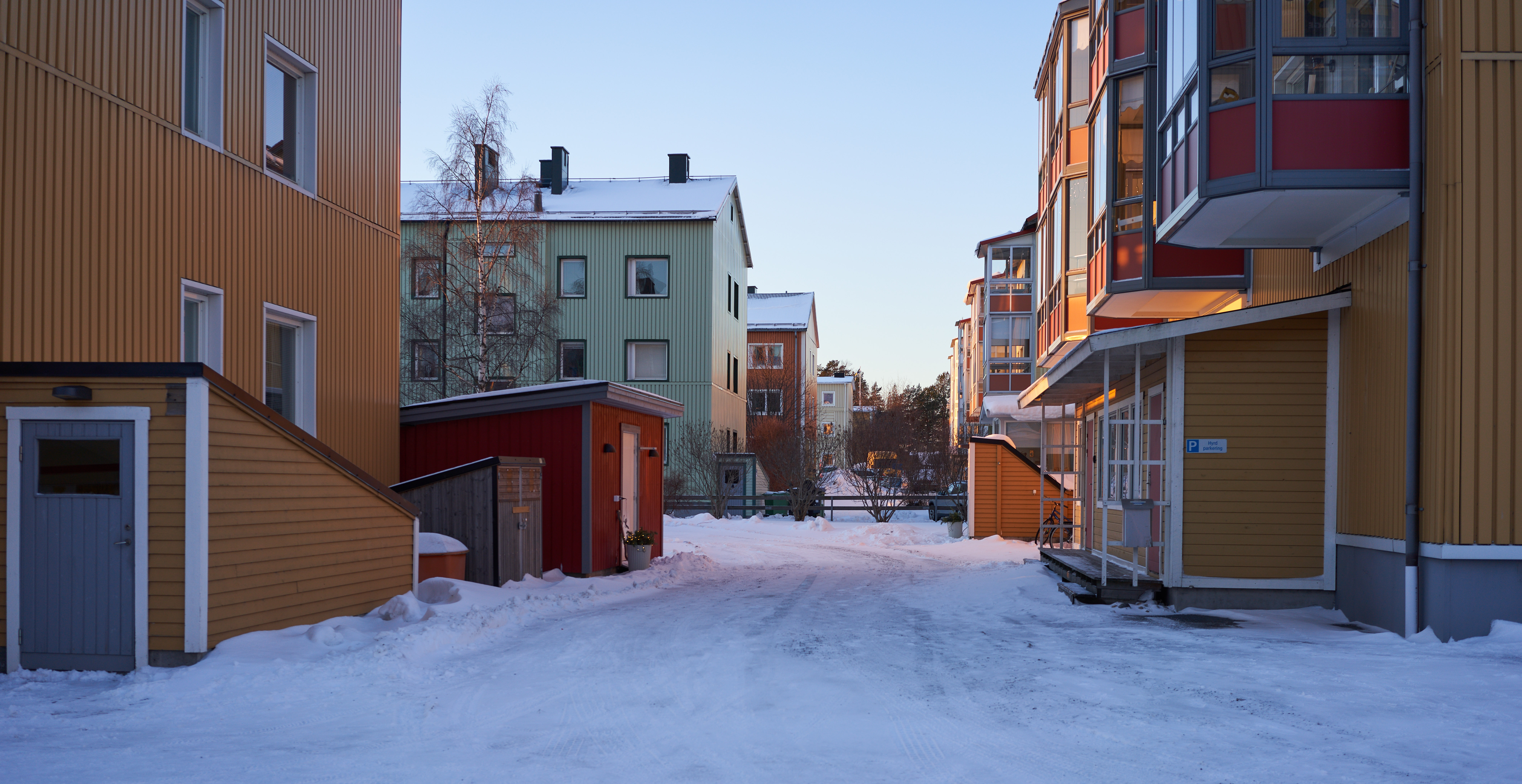
Luleå centrum, "Varvet"

== Economy ==
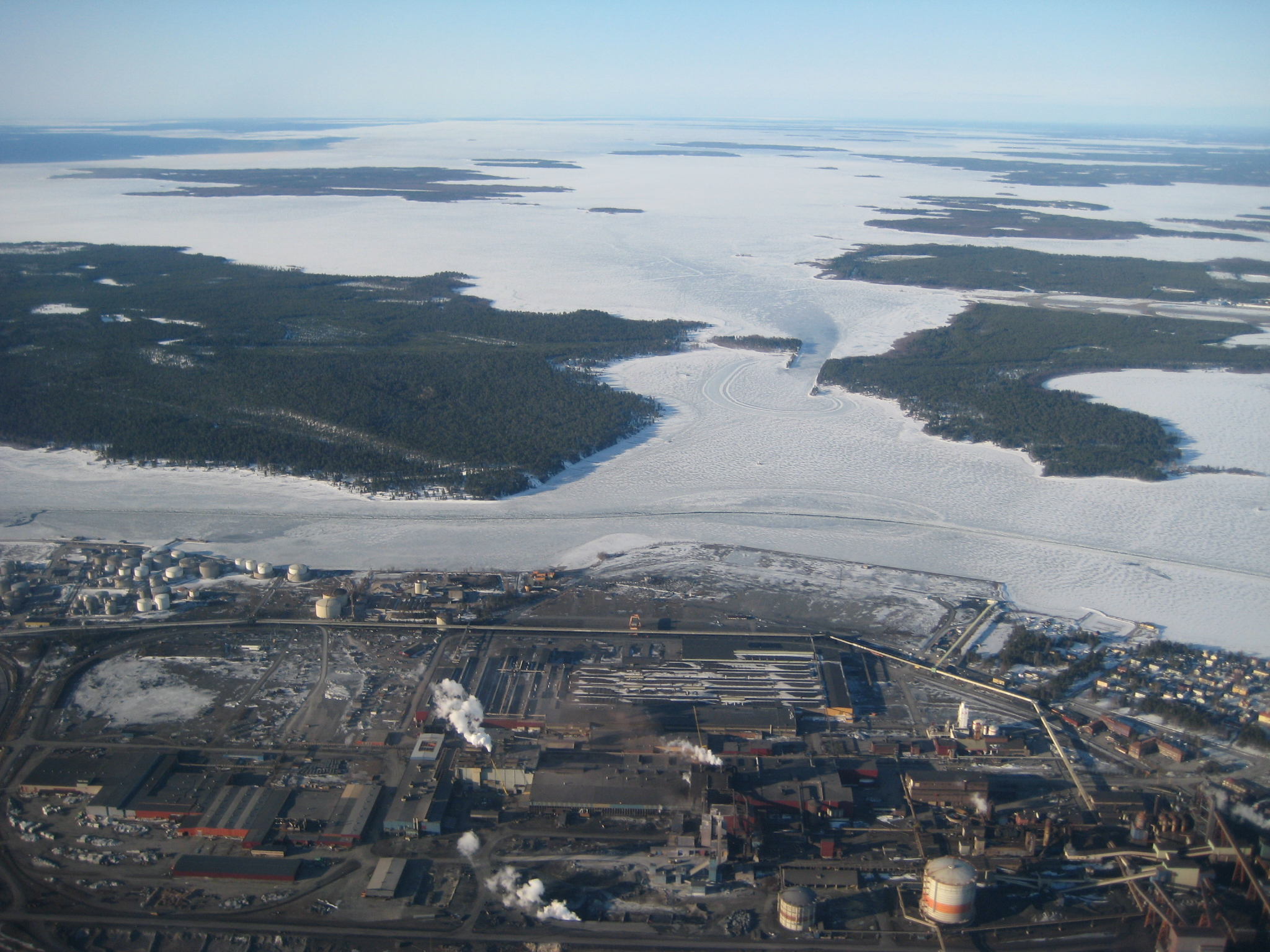
Industrial district of Luleå

Luleå's commerce and industry are a mix of industry, research, education, trade, and services.

Major employers in the city are the SSAB steelworks and Luleå University of Technology. A Swedish Air Force wing, F 21 (or Norrbotten Air Force Wing), is stationed near Luleå at the neighbouring Luleå Airport. Other major employers include Ferruform (a subsidiary of Scania AB) and Gestamp HardTech (acquired from SSAB 2005-01-01).

=== IT industry ===
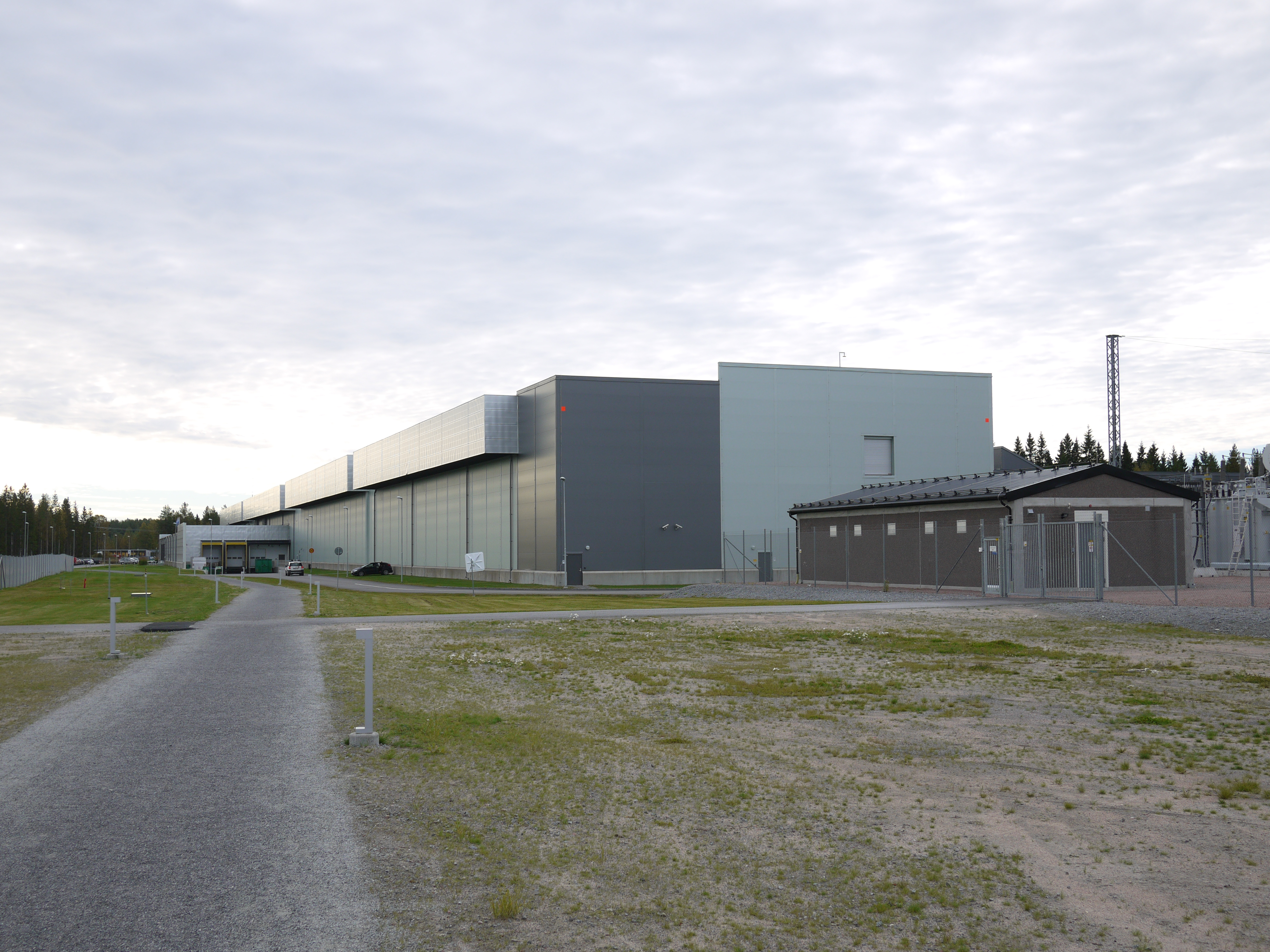
A Facebook datacenter building in Luleå

The information technology industry in Luleå has about 2000 employees (2008).

Luleå is the home of several major innovations and technological milestones.

- Broadcast radio: RDS, DAB, DARC (1992–1997)
- The Luleå algorithm for routing (1997)
- Living Labs: leading European service testbed with 6000 users (2001–)
- Marratech: pioneers in Internet-based E-meetings (1998–) – acquired by Google, releasing in November 2008 video-chat support in Gmail
- Arena project, IT in Sports: sensors, handheld wireless video (1999–2002)
- Estreet project: First large-scale mobile marketing experiment (2000)
- On 27 October 2011, Facebook announced it would locate its first data center outside of the United States in Luleå. The whole facility is made up by a set of three 28,000 m^{2} (300,000 sq ft) buildings. The first building was operational in 2012 and the site completed by 2016. The town's northern location and that it will become a hub for data traffic in Europe has generated a new epithet for the Luleå region – The Node Pole. The Node Pole region provides stable, low-cost electricity that is 100-percent derived from renewable sources. In addition, they cite the benefits of low cooling expenses, given that the region is one of the coolest in Sweden. Sweden's long political stability is cited as another long-term benefit of the Node Pole's location.

== Climate ==
Luleå has a subarctic climate (Dfc) with short, mild to warm summers and long, cold, snowy winters.

Luleå's climate is influenced both by the North Atlantic and the proximity to the Gulf of Bothnia and it has a milder climate than most cities on the same latitude and even some that are further south in Canada, Alaska, Northeast China and Siberia. During the summer in June and July the temperature in Luleå can some days rise to around 30 °C (86 °F). Summers are very bright, with marginal twilight being the only exception during the summer solstice.

From September to March, northern lights can be seen if the sky is clear.

Climate data for Luleå, 1991–2020 averages; extremes since 1944; sunshine hours and snow depth 2002–2020
Month	Jan	Feb	Mar	Apr	May	Jun	Jul	Aug	Sep	Oct	Nov	Dec	Year
Record high °C (°F)	10.3 (50.5)	9.8 (49.6)	13.4 (56.1)	18.1 (64.6)	28.4 (83.1)	32.2 (90.0)	32.1 (89.8)	29.2 (84.6)	22.5 (72.5)	16.9 (62.4)	13.0 (55.4)	8.5 (47.3)	32.2 (90.0)
Mean daily maximum °C (°F)	−4.6 (23.7)	−4.8 (23.4)	0.0 (32.0)	5.1 (41.2)	11.8 (53.2)	17.2 (63.0)	20.5 (68.9)	18.4 (65.1)	13.1 (55.6)	5.8 (42.4)	0.2 (32.4)	−2.8 (27.0)	6.7 (44.0)
Daily mean °C (°F)	−8.7 (16.3)	−9.1 (15.6)	−4.4 (24.1)	1.0 (33.8)	7.3 (45.1)	13.0 (55.4)	16.5 (61.7)	14.6 (58.3)	9.5 (49.1)	2.7 (36.9)	−2.9 (26.8)	−6.5 (20.3)	2.8 (37.0)
Mean daily minimum °C (°F)	−12.8 (9.0)	−13.4 (7.9)	−8.8 (16.2)	−3.1 (26.4)	2.7 (36.9)	8.8 (47.8)	12.4 (54.3)	10.9 (51.6)	5.9 (42.6)	−0.3 (31.5)	−5.9 (21.4)	−10.2 (13.6)	−1.1 (30.0)
Record low °C (°F)	−42.3 (−44.1)	−38.2 (−36.8)	−32.3 (−26.1)	−20.4 (−4.7)	−8.8 (16.2)	−1.2 (29.8)	3.2 (37.8)	−0.2 (31.6)	−8.4 (16.9)	−20.7 (−5.3)	−30.3 (−22.5)	−33.7 (−28.7)	−42.3 (−44.1)
Average precipitation mm (inches)	49.8 (1.96)	34.6 (1.36)	31.3 (1.23)	30.6 (1.20)	41.4 (1.63)	61.6 (2.43)	68.2 (2.69)	66.4 (2.61)	59.6 (2.35)	55.4 (2.18)	53.2 (2.09)	49.0 (1.93)	601.1 (23.66)
Average extreme snow depth cm (inches)	55 (22)	72 (28)	75 (30)	64 (25)	0 (0)	0 (0)	0 (0)	0 (0)	0 (0)	5 (2.0)	16 (6.3)	30 (12)	79 (31)
Average precipitation days (≥ 1 mm)	10	8.6	7.5	6.5	6.9	8.5	9.1	8.8	8.2	9.2	10.1	10.5	103.9
Mean monthly sunshine hours	21	78	172	225	289	305	310	245	154	92	38	3	1,932
Mean daily daylight hours	5	8.4	11.8	15.4	19.2	22.5	20.5	16.6	13.1	9.6	6	3.5	12.6
Average ultraviolet index	1	1	1	2	3	4	5	4	3	2	1	1	2
Source 1: SMHI
Source 2: Climates to travel NOAA(precipitation and precip days at Luleå Airport) Weather Atlas(daylight-UV)

Average sea temperatures and daily daylight hours in Luleå
Month	Jan	Feb	Mar	Apr	May	Jun	Jul	Aug	Sep	Oct	Nov	Dec	Year
Average sea temperature °C (°F)	-0.3	-0.7	-0.2	0.4	3.1	10.8	16.3	15.7	11.8	7.6	5.0	2.8	5.9
Source: Weather Atlas

Climate data for Luleå Airport, 2002–2020 averages; extremes since 1944
Month	Jan	Feb	Mar	Apr	May	Jun	Jul	Aug	Sep	Oct	Nov	Dec	Year
Record high °C (°F)	10.3 (50.5)	9.8 (49.6)	13.4 (56.1)	18.1 (64.6)	28.4 (83.1)	32.2 (90.0)	32.1 (89.8)	29.2 (84.6)	22.5 (72.5)	16.9 (62.4)	13.0 (55.4)	8.5 (47.3)	32.2 (90.0)
Mean maximum °C (°F)	4.0 (39.2)	5.3 (41.5)	8.7 (47.7)	13.3 (55.9)	21.4 (70.5)	24.3 (75.7)	26.7 (80.1)	24.1 (75.4)	18.8 (65.8)	12.5 (54.5)	7.2 (45.0)	5.3 (41.5)	27.8 (82.0)
Mean daily maximum °C (°F)	−5.2 (22.6)	−4.5 (23.9)	0.2 (32.4)	5.6 (42.1)	12.3 (54.1)	17.4 (63.3)	20.5 (68.9)	18.7 (65.7)	13.4 (56.1)	5.9 (42.6)	0.6 (33.1)	−2.0 (28.4)	6.9 (44.4)
Daily mean °C (°F)	−9.1 (15.6)	−8.7 (16.3)	−4.2 (24.4)	1.5 (34.7)	7.7 (45.9)	13.3 (55.9)	16.6 (61.9)	15.0 (59.0)	9.9 (49.8)	2.9 (37.2)	−2.4 (27.7)	−5.6 (21.9)	3.1 (37.5)
Mean daily minimum °C (°F)	−13.0 (8.6)	−12.9 (8.8)	−8.5 (16.7)	−2.6 (27.3)	3.1 (37.6)	9.1 (48.4)	12.6 (54.7)	11.2 (52.2)	6.3 (43.3)	−0.2 (31.6)	−5.4 (22.3)	−9.1 (15.6)	−0.8 (30.6)
Mean minimum °C (°F)	−26.6 (−15.9)	−25.7 (−14.3)	−20.1 (−4.2)	−10.2 (13.6)	−3.1 (26.4)	3.5 (38.3)	7.3 (45.1)	4.3 (39.7)	−0.9 (30.4)	−9.7 (14.5)	−15.8 (3.6)	−21.2 (−6.2)	−29.2 (−20.6)
Record low °C (°F)	−42.3 (−44.1)	−38.2 (−36.8)	−32.3 (−26.1)	−20.4 (−4.7)	−8.8 (16.2)	−1.2 (29.8)	3.2 (37.8)	−0.2 (31.6)	−8.4 (16.9)	−20.7 (−5.3)	−30.3 (−22.5)	−33.7 (−28.7)	−42.3 (−44.1)
Average precipitation mm (inches)	57.9 (2.28)	36.8 (1.45)	30.2 (1.19)	31.3 (1.23)	45.1 (1.78)	65.8 (2.59)	67.6 (2.66)	69.5 (2.74)	66.0 (2.60)	52.9 (2.08)	52.6 (2.07)	56.3 (2.22)	632 (24.89)
Average extreme snow depth cm (inches)	55 (22)	72 (28)	75 (30)	64 (25)	0 (0)	0 (0)	0 (0)	0 (0)	0 (0)	5 (2.0)	16 (6.3)	30 (12)	79 (31)
Mean monthly sunshine hours	21	78	172	225	289	305	310	245	154	92	38	3	1,932
Source 1: SMHI
Source 2: SMHI

== Media ==
Newspapers include:

- Norrbottens-Kuriren
- Norrländska Socialdemokraten

== Transportation ==
Luleå became a transport hub in the region for ore, steel and freight, with trans-shipping between road, ship and rail.

=== Public transport ===
Public transport in Luleå is operated by Luleå Lokaltrafik and consists of five main bus lines, an additional five bus lines, and direct connection bus traffic and night bus service. From Luleå Bus station, Länstrafiken i Norrbotten operates several regional bus lines within Norrbotten County.

=== Air ===
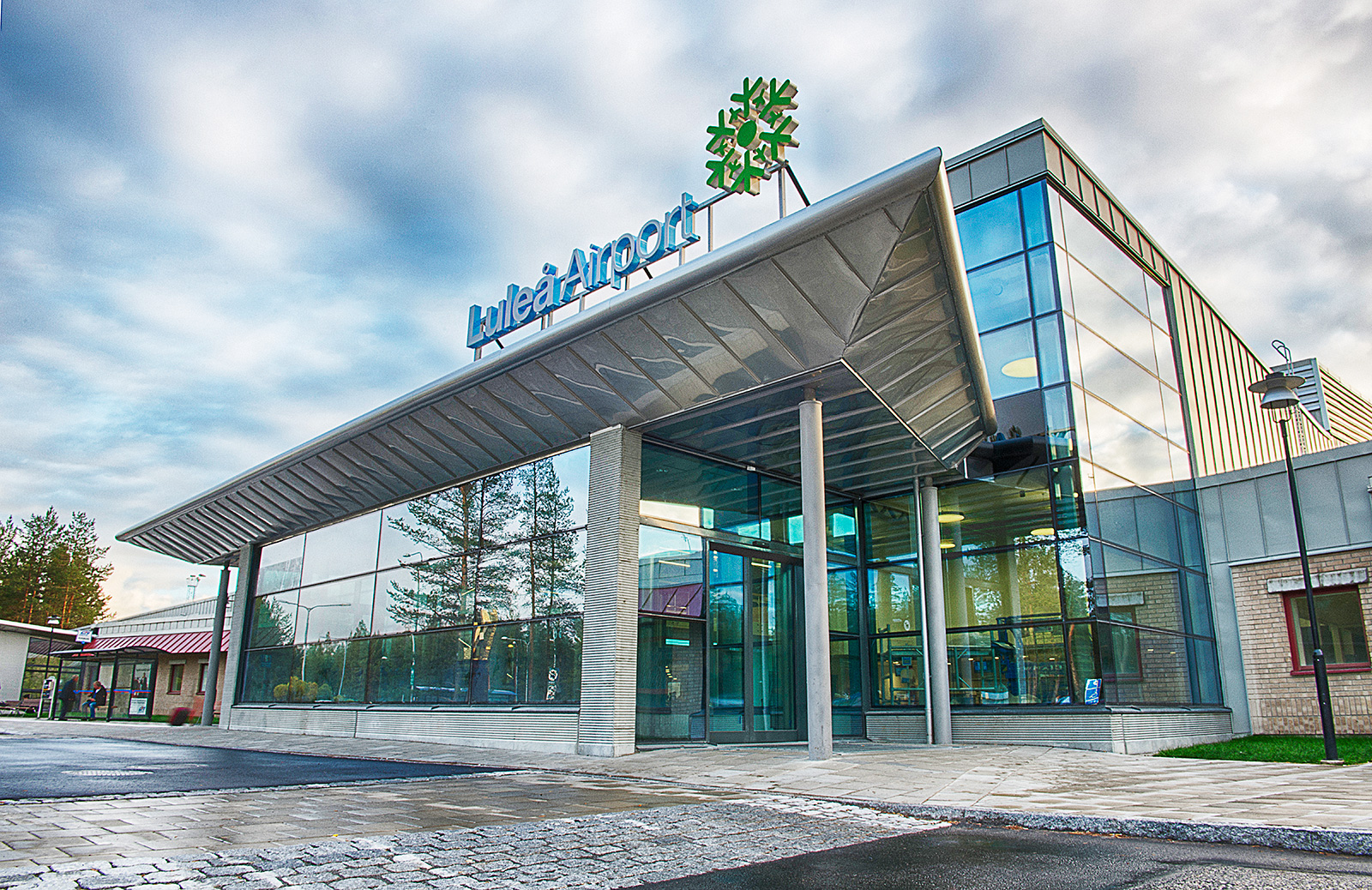
Luleå/Kallax Airport

Luleå/Kallax Airport (IATA: LLA, ICAO: ESPA), located 7 km (5 mi) south of the city centre, is the fifth largest airport in Sweden, with about 1.2 million yearly passengers. It is the largest airport in Norrland. The domestic route to Stockholm Arlanda Airport is the third busiest domestic route in Sweden with over 1 million passengers per year. There are about 15 daily flights to and from Stockholm. Luleå Lokaltrafik operates connections to and from Luleå/Kallax Airport via lines 4 and 104.

In total, there are seven scheduled destinations and about 15 additional charter destinations. The Stockholm Arlanda Airport route is operated by Scandinavian Airlines and Norwegian Air Shuttle and serves the vast majority of passengers at the airport with about 16 daily connections each way. Scandinavian Airlines also operates a direct connection to Göteborg Landvetter Airport.

Nextjet operates connections to and from Göteborg Landvetter Airport via Höga Kusten Airport, and their Tromsø Airport – Oulu Airport route lands at Luleå/Kallax Airport on some departures. Jonair offers connections to Pajala Airport.

=== Rail ===
Luleå has rail lines coming from both north and south. SJ operates night train services northbound for Kiruna and Narvik, and southbound for Stockholm. Norrtåg operates train services from Luleå to Umeå, Kiruna and Haparanda.

=== Sea ===
In terms of bulk shipments, the Port of Luleå is one of the country's biggest ports.

== Shopping ==
The world's first indoor mall was opened in Luleå in 1955 (architect: Ralph Erskine) and was named Shopping. There are two other malls in Luleå: Strand and Smedjan. The main shopping streets in Luleå are Storgatan and Kungsgatan. A few kilometres outside Luleå there is a shopping centre called Storheden.

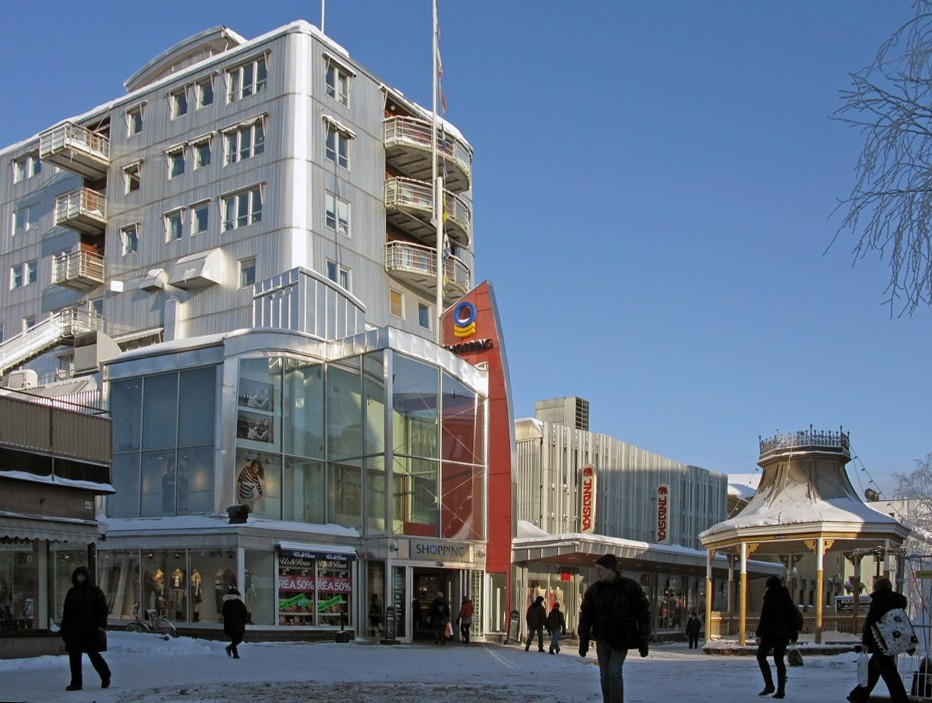
Shopping, the world's first indoor mall

== Culture ==
Luleå has a variety of cultural institutions, among them Norrbottensteatern; Norrbottens Museum; and Norrbotten Big Band, led by Tim Hagans. In January 2007, the Cultural House (Kulturens Hus) was opened. A library, concerts, and art exhibitions are all hosted here.

Luleå is also home to hardcore punk band Raised Fist, melodic death metal band The Duskfall, power metal band Machinae Supremacy and death 'n' roll band Helltrain.

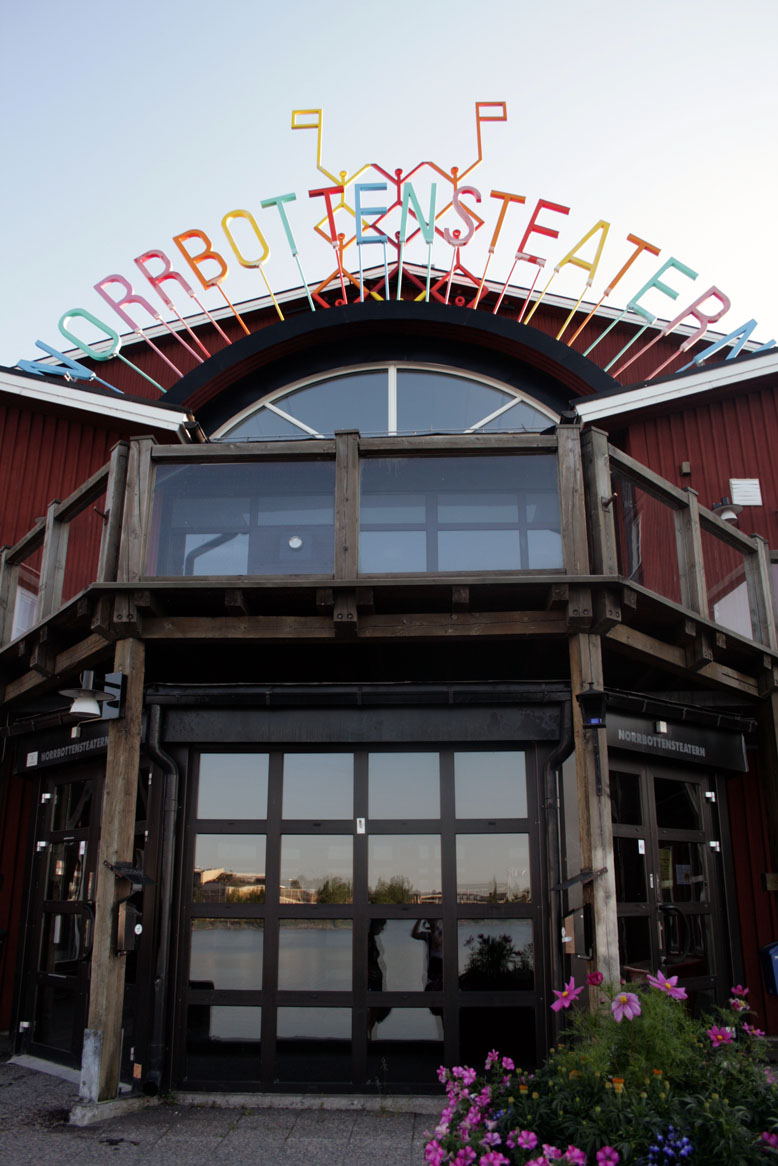
The Theatre of Norrbotten

One of the largest winter festivals in Luleå is the indoor Minus 30-festivalen, held at Kulturens hus (the House of Culture) annually on a Saturday in mid-March.

Luleå Hamnfestival (Luleå harbor festival) is a big summer event in the center of Luleå, mostly centered around the north harbor. The festival has been a recurring event each summer since 2013. Held in July, it is a free event not targeting a specific group. The festival is the new version of Luleåkalaset which was held each summer from 2002 to 2012, which itself replaced sjöslaget, the summer festival from 1988 to 2002.

Musikens makt (The power of music) is a smaller, free music festival that is held each summer in August at Gültzauudden since 2010.

Ice music is a new art form where professional musicians play on instruments made out of ice. The concerts are performed in a huge igloo and the instruments pulsate in all the colors of the rainbow.

Luleå is the base for the Norrbotten Band of the Home Guard Music which consists of voluntary musicians from Norrbotten County's Home Guard.

== Sports ==
Luleå has many teams competing in a variety of sports.

Four teams in Luleå compete in the highest Swedish leagues: Luleå Basket (female basketball team, previously called Northland Basket); BC Luleå (male basketball team, previously named Plannja Basket and LF Basket Norrland); and Luleå Hockey/MSSK (Munksund-Skuthamns Sportklubb) (female ice hockey team) and Luleå Hockey (male ice hockey team).

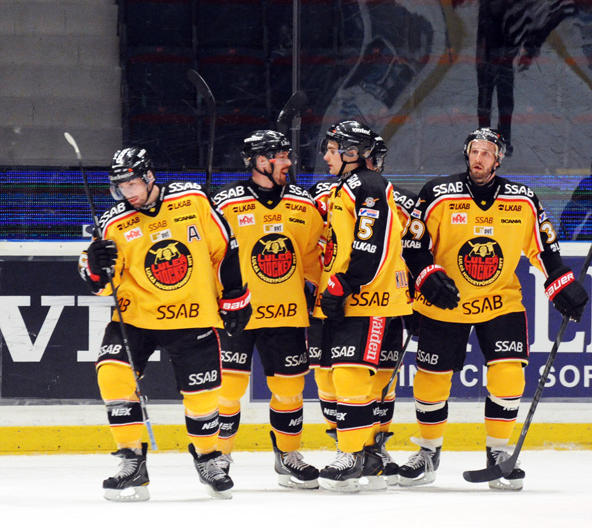
Players in Luleå Hockey

Luleå Basket has won two Swedish championships (2014 and 2015), while BC Luleå has won eight Swedish championships (1997, 1999, 2000, 2002, 2004, 2006, 2007 and 2017). Luleå Hockey/MSSK female team won their first Swedish Championship in 2016 while the male Luleå Hockey team has won two Swedish Championships (1996 and 2025), the European Trophy in 2012 and the Champions Hockey League in 2015.

=== Football ===
- Bergnäsets AIK
- Ersnäs IF
- IFK Luleå
- Lira BK
- Luleå SK
- Notvikens IK

=== Ice hockey ===
- Luleå HF play in the Swedish Hockey League
- Luleå HF/MSSK play in the SDHL

=== Basketball ===
- BC Luleå, formerly LF Basket Norrbotten and Plannja, for men and Luleå Basket for women; Plannja has won Basketligan seven times, which is a record.

=== Yukigassen ===
The Swedish Championship in Yukigassen is held in Luleå annually.

== Notable people ==
Acting & Art

- Martin Ljung (1917–2010) a Swedish comedian, actor and singer
- Gösta Wallmark (1928–2017) a Swedish artist
- Lena Granhagen (born 1938) a Swedish actress and singer
- Bernt Ström (1940–2009) a Swedish actor
- Hans Ernback (1942–2013) a Swedish actor between 1966 and 1984
- Maud Adams (born 1945) Swedish actress, appeared in two James Bond films
- Fanny Gjörup (1961–2001) a Swedish child actress
- Mamma Andersson (born 1962) aka Karin Andersson, a Swedish artist of domestic interiors, lush landscapes and genre scenes
- Gry Forssell (born 1973) a Swedish TV host and radio talk-show host; brought up in Luleå

Writing

- Nels F. S. Ferré (1908–1971) a theologian and writer on Christian theology
- Erik Lindegren (1910–1968) a Swedish author, poet, critical writer and member of the Swedish Academy
- Staffan Göthe (born 1944) a Swedish playwright, actor and director
- Katarina Kieri (born 1965) a Swedish writer

Classical Music

- Ingvar Wixell (1931–2011) a Swedish baritone, active from 1955 to 2003
- Gunnar Wiklund (1935–1989) a Swedish singer
- Malin Gjörup (1964–2020) a Swedish actress, mezzo-soprano and producer at Gävle Symphony Orchestra
- Peter Mattei (born 1965) a Swedish operatic baritone

Modern Music

- Gunnar Wiklund (1935–1989) a Swedish singer of Schlager music
- Emilia de Poret (born 1976) a Swedish singer, fashion designer and editor
- Zacke (born 1983) aka Zakarias Lekberg, rapper
- The Bear Quartet (formed 1989) a Swedish indie rock band
- Elizabeth and Victoria Lejonhjärta (born 1990) raised in Luleå, Swedish twin models, and writers; work with rapper Drake
- Him Kerosene (formed 1991) a Swedish alternative rock band
- Breach (active 1993–2002) a defunct Swedish post-hardcore band
- Raised Fist (formed in 1993) a Swedish hardcore punk band
- Far Apart (active 1995-1999) a short-lived Swedish Emo/hardcore band
- The Duskfall (formed in 1999) a Swedish melodic death metal band
- Machinae Supremacy (formed 2000) a Swedish modern heavy metal, power metal and alternative rock band
- Movits! (formed 2007) a Swedish swing and hip hop band

Public Service

- Erik Benzelius the Elder (1632–1709) a Swedish theologian and Archbishop of Uppsala
- Anders Hackzell (1705–1757) the chief enforcement officer and cartographer for the Swedish crown.
- Paul Petter Waldenström (1838–1917) a Swedish theologian, leader of the free church
- Fritiof Enbom (1918–1974) a Swedish railway worker and convicted spy for the Soviet Union
- Marita Ulvskog (born 1951) a Swedish politician and Member of the European Parliament
- Jan Lexell (born 1958) a Swedish physician and academic, specialises in rehabilitation medicine and neurology
- Åsa Nyström (born 1960) a Swedish prelate and current bishop of the Diocese of Luleå
- Amanda Lind (born 1980) a Swedish politician, since 2019 the Culture minister and Democracy minister

Business

- John W. Nordstrom (1871–1963) a Swedish American businessman, co-founded the chain store Nordstrom
- Stephan Gip (born 1936) a Swedish designer and interior designer
- Leif Östling (born 1945) CEO of Scania AB
- Adam Dunkels (born 1978) a Swedish computer scientist, programmer and entrepreneur

Sport

- August Wikström (1874–1954) a Swedish sports shooter, competed in the 1912 Summer Olympics
- Robert Zander (1895–1966) a Swedish footballer, competed in the 1920 Summer Olympics
- Sigge Bergman (1905–2001) a Swedish sports executive, secretary general of the International Ski Federation 1961–1979
- Stig Lundholm (1917–2009) a Swedish chess master, won 1944 Swedish Chess Championship
- Sonja Edström (born 1930) a retired Swedish cross-country skier, competed at the 1952, 1956 and 1960 Olympics
- Runald Beckman (born 1951) a Swedish athlete, competed in the 1976 Summer Olympics and the 1980 Winter Olympics
- Lars Petrus (born 1960) an accomplished speedcuber
- Göran Titus (born 1967) a former Swedish freestyle swimmer, competed in the 1988 and 1992 Summer Olympics
- Magnus Ingesson (born 1971) a Swedish cross country skier, competed in the 2002 Winter Olympics
- Jonas Eriksson (born 1974) a former Swedish football referee, a full FIFA referee 2002–2018
- Sara Eriksson (born 1974) a retired amateur Swedish freestyle wrestler
- Peter Larsson (born 1978) a Swedish cross-country skier, competed at the 2006 Winter Olympics
- Per Ledin (born 1978) a Swedish professional ice hockey forward
- Niklas Bäckström (born 1989) semi-retired Swedish mixed martial arts fighter, competed in the UFC
- Anders Nilsson (born 1990) a Swedish professional ice hockey goaltender
- Alexander Majorov (born 1991) a Swedish figure skater, lives in Luleå
- Linus Werneman (born 1992), Swedish professional ice hockey player

Other

- Märta Bucht (1882–1962), suffragist and peace activist
- Inga Hedberg (1927–2024), botanist and academic

== Panorama ==
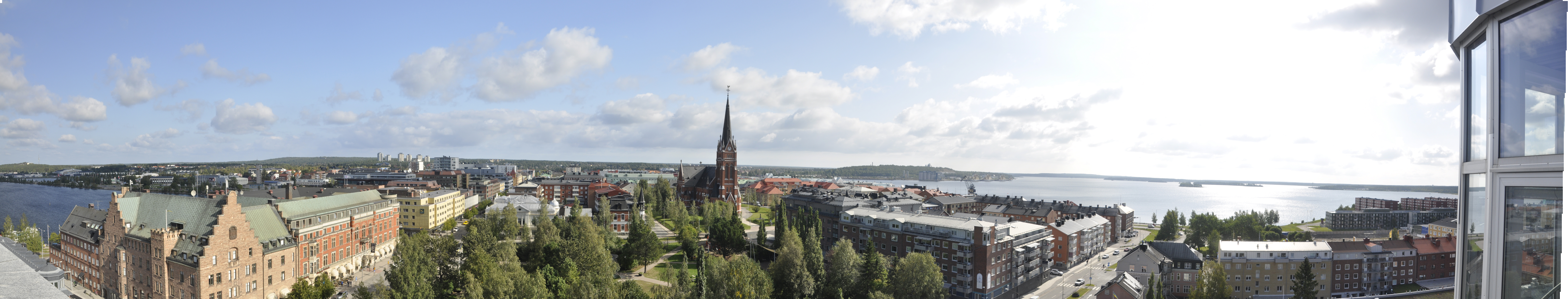
Luleå panorama, summer of 2014

== See also ==
- Diocese of Luleå
- Luleå Cathedral
- North Sweden European Office
