= Hans Stiglund =

Swedish bishop and author (born 1955)

The Right Reverend Hans Stiglund
- Bishop Emeritus of Luleå
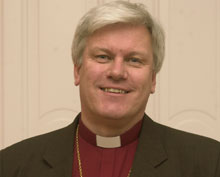
- Church: Church of Sweden
- Diocese: Luleå
- Appointed: 2002
- In office: 2002–2018
- Predecessor: Rune Backlund
- Successor: Åsa Nyström

Orders
- Ordination: 1980
- Consecration: 2002

Personal details
- Born: 8 June 1955 (age 70) Haparanda, Sweden
- Motto: Gud med oss (God with us)
- Coat of arms

Hans Bertil Stiglund (born 8 June 1955 in Haparanda) is a Swedish bishop and author who has been Bishop of the Diocese of Luleå since 2002.

== Biography ==
Stiglund studied theology at Uppsala University from 1974 to 1980 and took theology bachelor's degree in 1980. That same year he was ordained a priest for the Diocese of Gothenburg. He worked as curate and later as assistant pastor in Forshälla parish until 1987. He then became vicar in Pajala parish from 1987 to 1991 and in Alatornio Haparanda parish 1991-2002. From 1993 to 2002 he was rural dean in Kalix-Torne contracts and 1999-2002 deputy of the chapter. In 2002 he was elected as bishop of the Diocese of Luleå. He is the author of the book The border, which was published in 2013.
