= Björkskatan =

- Residential area
- Nickname: Björx
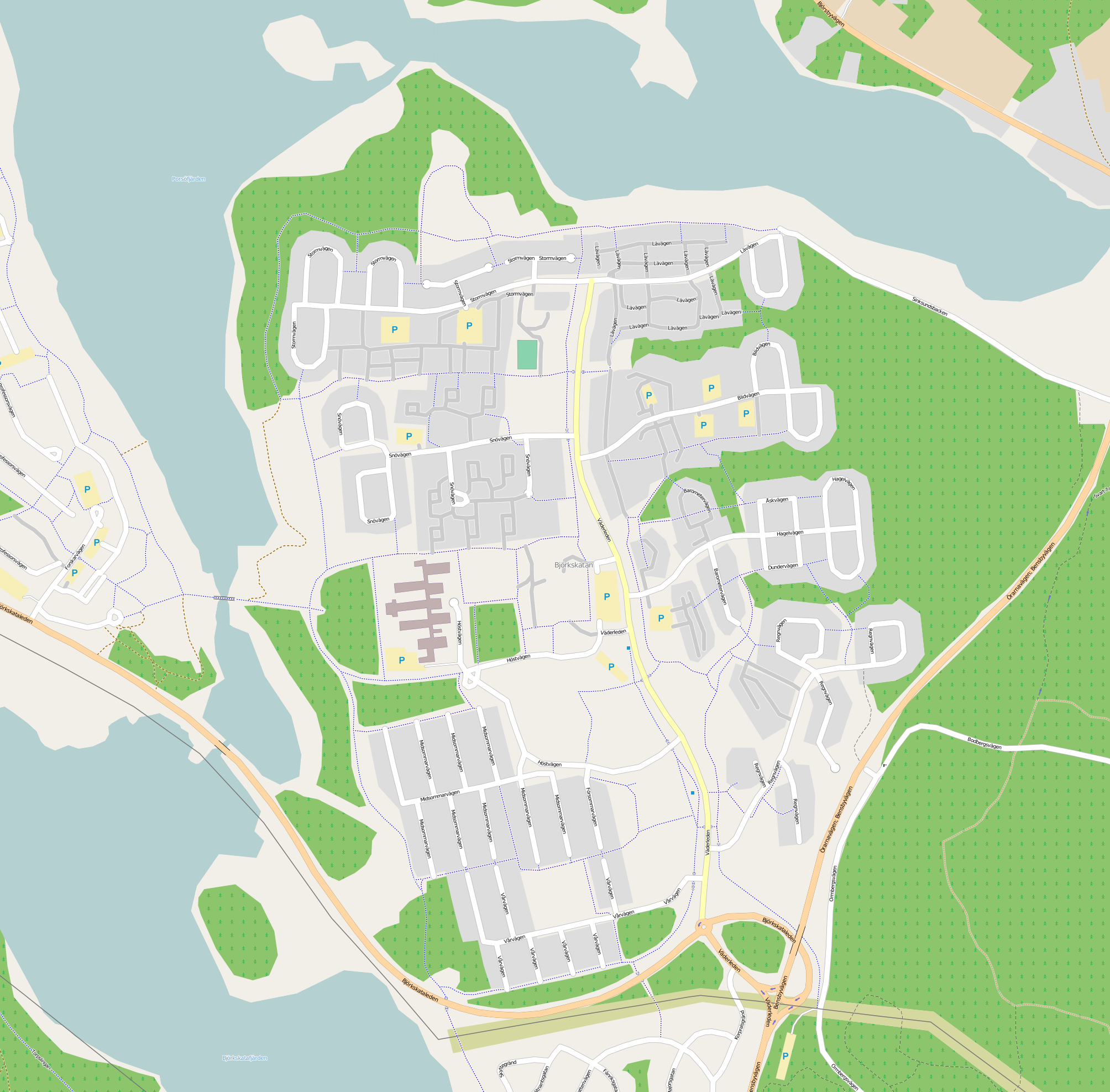
- Map of Björkskatan, from OpenStreetMap
- Coordinates: 65°36′40″N 22°10′30″E
- Country: Sweden
- Province: Norrbotten
- County: Norrbotten County
- Municipality: Luleå Municipality

Population (2010)
  - Total: 4,487
- Time zone: UTC+1 (CET)
  - Summer (DST): UTC+2 (CEST)

Björkskatan, often called Björx, is a residential area in Luleå, Sweden. It is located on the island of Hertsön.

== Census ==
The residential area had 4,487 inhabitants in 2010.
