= Åsa Nyström =

Swedish bishop

The Right Reverend Åsa Nyström
- Bishop of Luleå
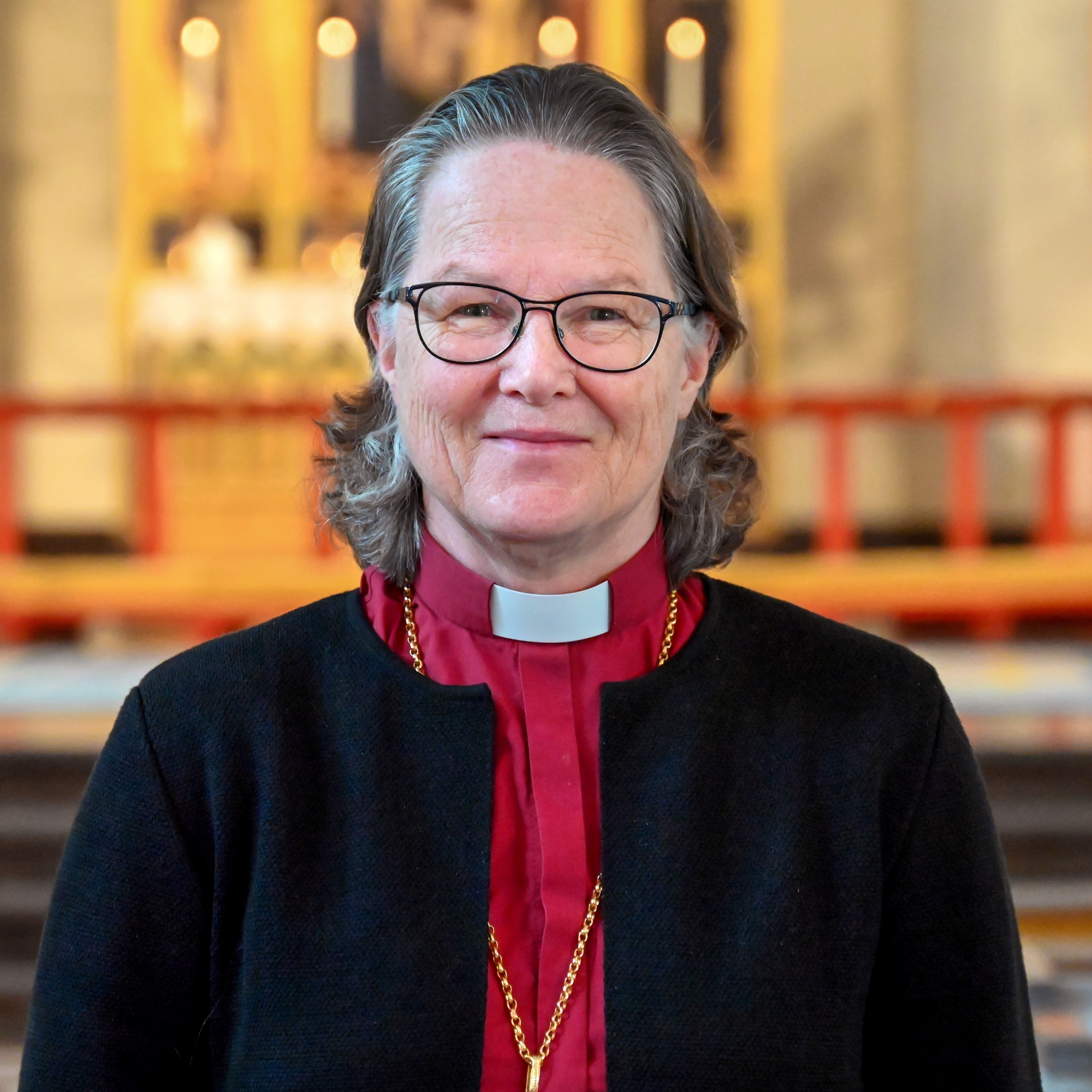
- Åsa Nyström, March 2023
- Church: Church of Sweden
- Diocese: Luleå
- Elected: 15 November 2017
- Installed: 10 June 2018
- Predecessor: Hans Stiglund

Orders
- Ordination: 1982
- Consecration: 3 June 2018 by Antje Jackelén

Personal details
- Born: 12 August 1960 (age 65) Umeå, Sweden
- Spouse: Per Olov Svahn
- Motto: Gud Verkar I Er (God works in you)
- Coat of arms

Åsa Gunilla Elisabet Nyström (born 12 August 1960 in Umeå) is a Swedish prelate and current bishop of the Diocese of Luleå within the Lutheran Church of Sweden.

== Biography ==
Nyström was ordained priest of the Swedish Evangelical Mission in 1982. In 1991 she was incardinated as a diocesan priest of the Church of Sweden. She has worked as director of studies and teachers in leadership at the Pastoral Institute in Uppsala and development secretary at the Swedish Church parish associations, focusing on management and leadership development. Most recently she worked as diocesan curate of leadership support at Uppsala diocese. She has also been a teacher and course director for management and leadership development in the Swedish Church.

In 2024 Nyström took part in the repatriation of Tornedalian and Sámi remains to Akamella which had been plundered from the site in 1878.

== Bishop ==
On 15 November 2018, Nyström 50.07% of the votes for the bishopric of Luleå, with a total of 267 votes. On 3 June 2018, she was consecrated bishop by the Archbishop of Uppsala in Uppsala Cathedral. On 10 June she was installed as Bishop of Luleå in Luleå Cathedral.
