= Movits! =

Swedish band

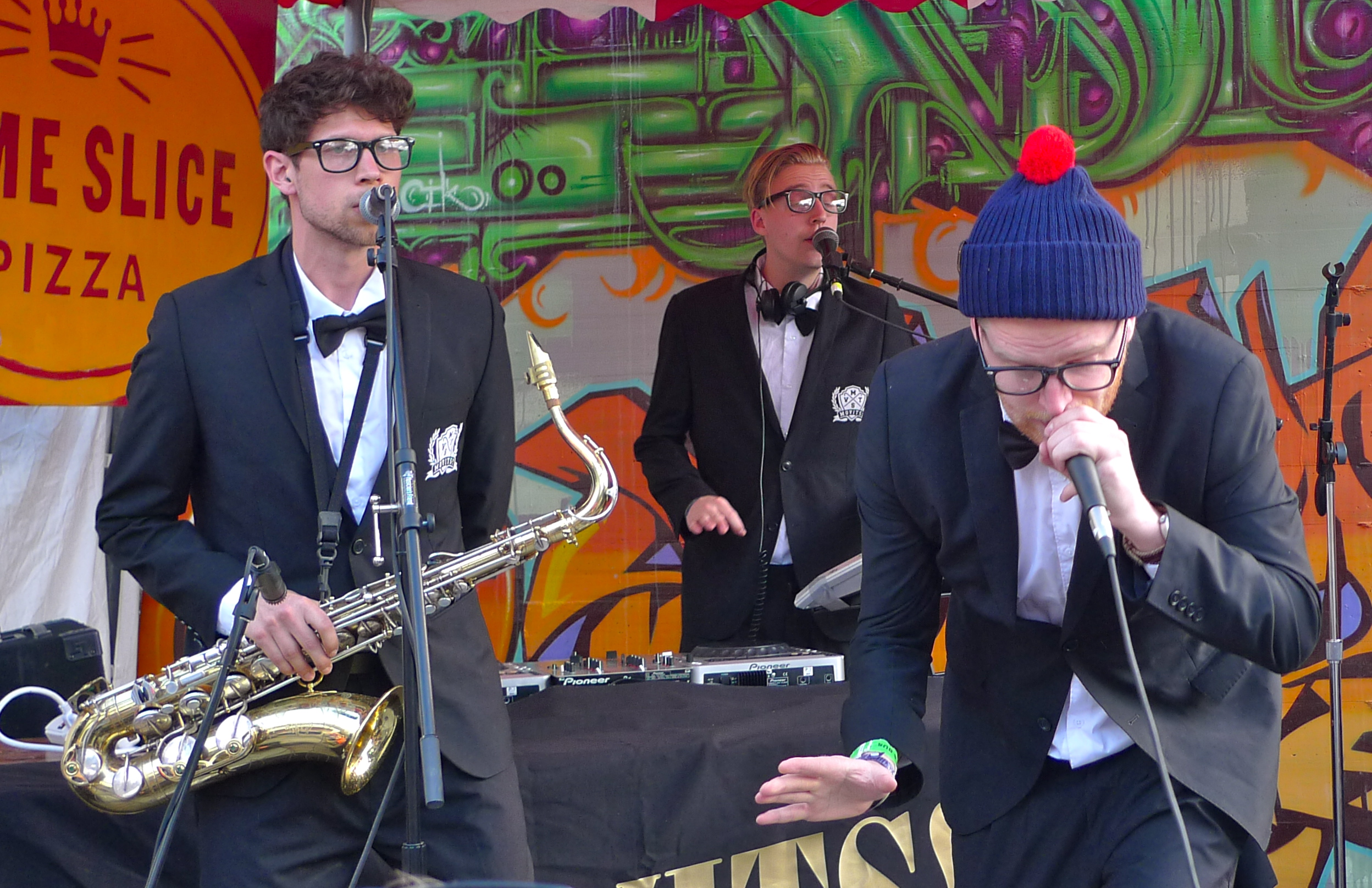
- Movits! at the 2010 SXSW Music Festival

Background information
- Origin: Luleå, Sweden
- Genres: Swing; hip hop; jazz
- Years active: 2007–present
- Labels: BD Music; Rambling; Bohéme Music; Universal; Slimstyle; Skycap; Goldenbest; Academy Of Fine Arts; Antarktis
- Members: Johan Rensfeldt; Anders Rensfeldt; Joakim Nilsson
- Website: http://www.movits.se

Movits! (Swedish pronunciation: [ˈmǔːvɪts]) is a Swedish music group from Luleå. The group plays swing mixed with hip hop. Their debut album Äppelknyckarjazz, literally translated as Apple swiper jazz or scrumping jazz, was released in November 2008 and has been recognized by national Swedish newspaper Dagens Nyheter.

The name Movits! alludes to Fader Movitz, a character in the Epistles of Fredman by Swedish 18th-century poet and composer Carl Michael Bellman. The band, however, replaced the last character of the name z with an s in order to avoid being associated with Swedish bands playing dansband style music, such as Lasse Stefanz, Svänzons or Larz-Kristerz.

On July 27, 2009, Movits! was featured on the American satirical news show The Colbert Report. The band was interviewed and performed their song "Fel del av gården". Colbert mentioned on his show on 30 July 2009, that the band's album Äppelknyckarjazz recently had gained significant popularity on Amazon.com and claimed that their appearance on his program was significantly responsible for their newfound popularity (referred to as "The Colbert Bump").

The band is made up of brothers Johan Jivin' Rensfeldt (vocals), Anders Rensfeldt (multi-instrumentalist and DJ) and saxophonist Joakim 'One-Take' Nilsson.

== Discography ==
=== Albums ===
Year	Album	Peak positions	Certification
Year	Album	SWE	Certification
2008	Äppelknyckarjazz	43	
2011	Ut ur min skalle / Out Of My Head	10	
2013	Huvudet bland molnen / Head Amongst the Clouds	18	
2015	Dom försökte begrava oss, dom visste inte att vi var frön / They Tried to Bury Us, They Didn't Know We Were Seeds	17	
2018	V:I		
2019	V:II	45	
2021	Halleluja		
2024	KALLAX CARGO		

=== Singles ===
- 2007: "Swing för hyresgästföreningen"
- 2008: "Äppelknyckarjazz"
- 2008: "Fel del av gården"
- 2009: "Spela mig på radion" (feat. Zacke)
- 2009: "Ta på dig dansskorna"
- 2011: "Skjut mig i huvet"
- 2011: "Na na nah!" (feat. Timbuktu)
- 2011: "Sammy Davis Jr"
- 2013: "Röksignaler"
- 2013: "Nitroglycerin"
- 2013: "Limousin" (feat. Maskinen) (Peak SWE #28)
- 2015: "Placebo"
- 2015: "Dansa i regnet"
- 2016: "Självantänd"
- 2018: "Gumbo"
- 2018: "Ohio"
- 2018: "Hett kol"
- 2019: "Himlen faller ner"
- 2019: "Sodavatten"
- 2019: "Fira mig"
- 2021: "Blixtar"
- 2021: "Juice"
- 2021: "Plåster"
- 2022: "Hellre Med Vargar"
