= Diocese of Luleå =

Diocese of Luleå Diocesis Lulensis Luleå stift
- Arms of the diocese of Luleå

- Flag

Location
- Country: Sweden
- Deaneries: 8 kontrakt
- Coordinates: 65°34′58″N 22°08′56″E

Statistics
- Congregations: 57

Information
- Denomination: Church of Sweden
- Established: 1904
- Cathedral: Luleå Cathedral

Current leadership
- Bishop: Åsa Nyström
- Metropolitan Archbishop: Antje Jackelén

Map

Website
- svenskakyrkan.se/luleastift

The Diocese of Luleå (Swedish: Luleå stift) is a Swedish diocese of the Church of Sweden with its Episcopal see in the city of Luleå.

== List of Bishops ==
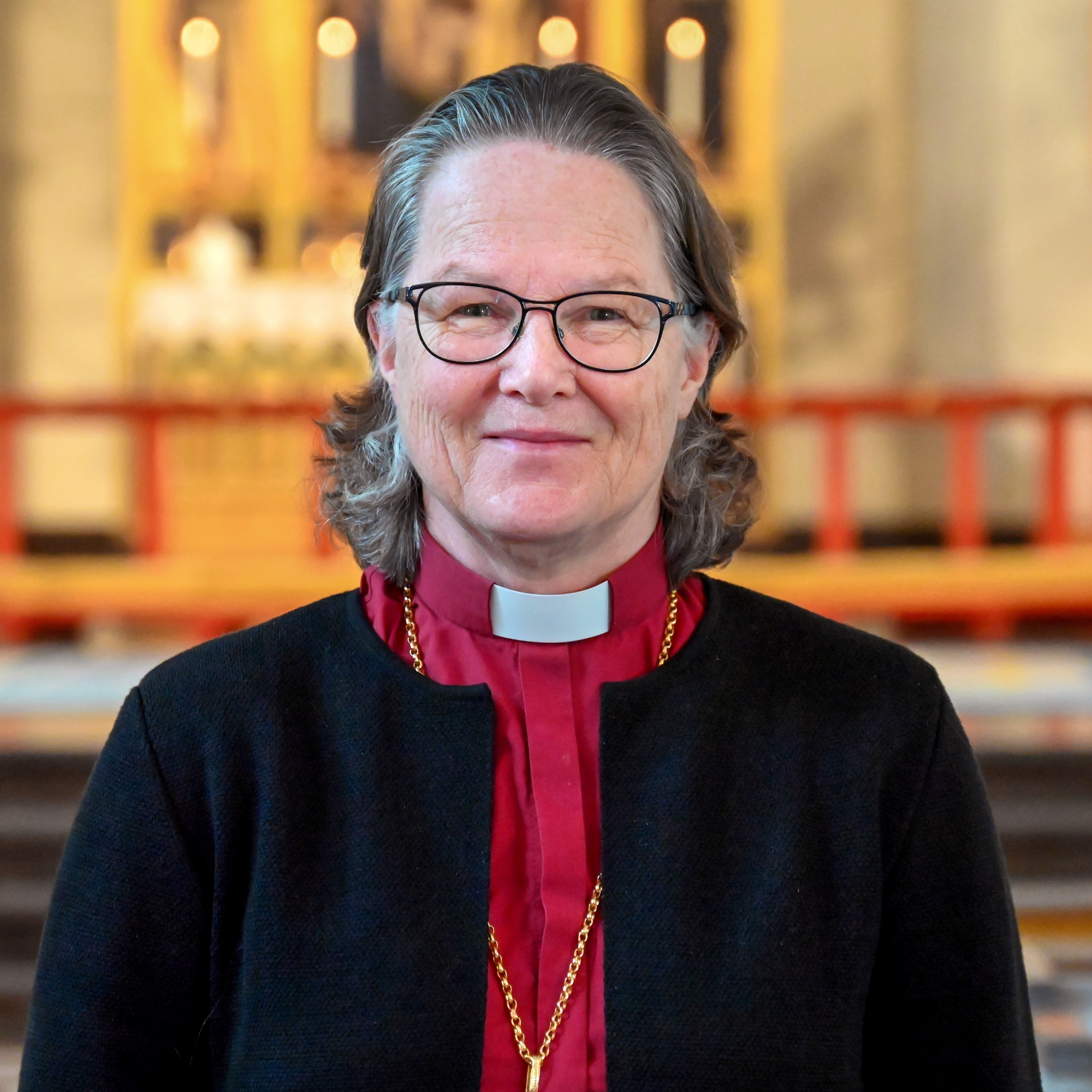
The current bishop, Åsa Nyström.

- Olof Bergqvist, 1904–1937
- Bengt Jonzon, 1937–1956
- Ivar Hylander, 1956–1966
- Stig Hellsten, 1966–1980
- Olaus Brännström, 1980–1986
- Gunnar Weman, 1986–1993
- Rune Backlund, 1993–2002
- Hans Stiglund, 2002–2018
- Åsa Nyström, 2018–present
