= Golden generation =

Concept in sports

In sport, a golden generation or golden team is an exceptionally gifted group of players of similar age, whose achievements reach or are expected to reach a level of success beyond that which their team had previously achieved. The term was first being cited by the media for Portugal's success during the FIFA Youth Championships in both 1989 and 1991. Alternatively, it can describe a group of players at a club, who typically are the same age group and often came through the club academy together. Often, a golden generation is given a nickname, such as "The Class of 92" or "The Bengan Boys".

Below is a list of teams who have been referred to by the media as golden generations, most of which played in the 21st century.

== Basketball ==
=== Argentina (2000–2012) ===
Led by Manu Ginóbili and accompanied by players like Luis Scola, Fabricio Oberto, Carlos Delfino, Andres Nocioni, Pablo Prigioni and Walter Herrmann, the Argentina national basketball team between 2000 and 2012 has been referred to as "the golden generation". The team won gold in the Americas Championship 2001, silver in 2002 FIBA World Championship, gold in Basketball at the 2004 Summer Olympics, gold in FIBA Diamond Ball 2008, bronze in Basketball at the 2008 Summer Olympics, and gold in 2011 FIBA Americas Championship, resulting in Argentina reaching the first position in the FIBA Men's Ranking at the end of the 2008 Olympic Games.

=== Croatia (1992–1995) ===
The Croatian basketball team's "golden generation" refers to the group of players who won a silver medal at the 1992 Barcelona Olympics, bronze at the 1993 and 1995 EuroBasket, and bronze at the 1994 World Championship. Key players included legends like Dražen Petrović, Toni Kukoč, and Dino Rađa, who, along with other talented athletes, brought Croatia immediate success after the breakup of Yugoslavia.

== Football ==
=== Europe ===
==== Belgium (2014–2022) ====
During the 10 years from 2002 to 2012 in which Belgium failed to qualify for major tournaments, a golden generation matured, many of whom gained both prime individual and team awards in foreign European clubs and competitions. These include Eden Hazard, who at his peak was one of the top players in the world; defender and former captain Vincent Kompany; Kevin De Bruyne, who is widely regarded as one of the best midfielders of his generation; and Romelu Lukaku, who is currently Belgium's all-time top scorer. Other key players of this golden generation include Thibaut Courtois, Jan Vertonghen, Yannick Carrasco, Axel Witsel, Mousa Dembélé, Dries Mertens, Marouane Fellaini, Thomas Vermaelen, and Toby Alderweireld. These players helped Belgium finish in third place at the 2018 FIFA World Cup, the team's best ever performance at the World Cup; and reach number one in the FIFA World Rankings for the first time in November 2015.

At the 2018 FIFA World Cup, Belgium performed excellently, earning themselves a third-place finish. Captain Hazard won the Silver Ball as the second best player of the tournament behind Luka Modrić whereas goalkeeper Courtois was awarded the Golden Glove for his performance during the tournament.

Numerous sports commentators marked Belgium's elimination from the group stage of the 2022 FIFA World Cup as the end of Belgium's golden generation. Ahead of that tournament, midfielder De Bruyne had responded with "No chance, we're too old" to a question about Belgium's chances of winning the World Cup. Similarly, Hazard stated that they had "a better chance to win four years ago." De Bruyne echoed these sentiments, stating, "I think our chance was 2018. We have a good team, but it is aging." Of the 26 players on the 2022 squad, 11 were at least 30 years old during the 2022 World Cup. Coach Roberto Martínez resigned following Belgium's elimination after six years with the team.

Belgium managed to reach the Quarter-Finals of the 2026 World Cup, despite low expectations, with several of the remaining ‘golden generation’ players participating in their last performance.

They managed to equalise with European Champions Spain, but succumbed to a 2-1 loss, due to a goalkeeping error, less than two minutes after their veteran goalkeeper Thibaut Courtois was substituted with an injury in the last few minutes of the game. Many commentators agreed that this would inevitably be the last World Cup for the last remaining stars of the Belgium golden generation.

==== Croatia (1996–1999, 2017–2026) ====
Croatia's first golden football generation was the team from the late 1990s, which in their first ever major international competition at the 1996 EURO played the quarter-finals against Germany and won the bronze medal at the 1998 FIFA World Cup which was also their first ever World Cup appearance. This generation is remembered for key players like Davor Šuker, Zvonimir Boban, Robert Prosinečki, and Robert Jarni. The team's success, including Šuker winning the Golden Boot, earned them a third-place FIFA ranking in January 1999 marking the fastest ascension in FIFA ranking history and established them as a major force in international football.

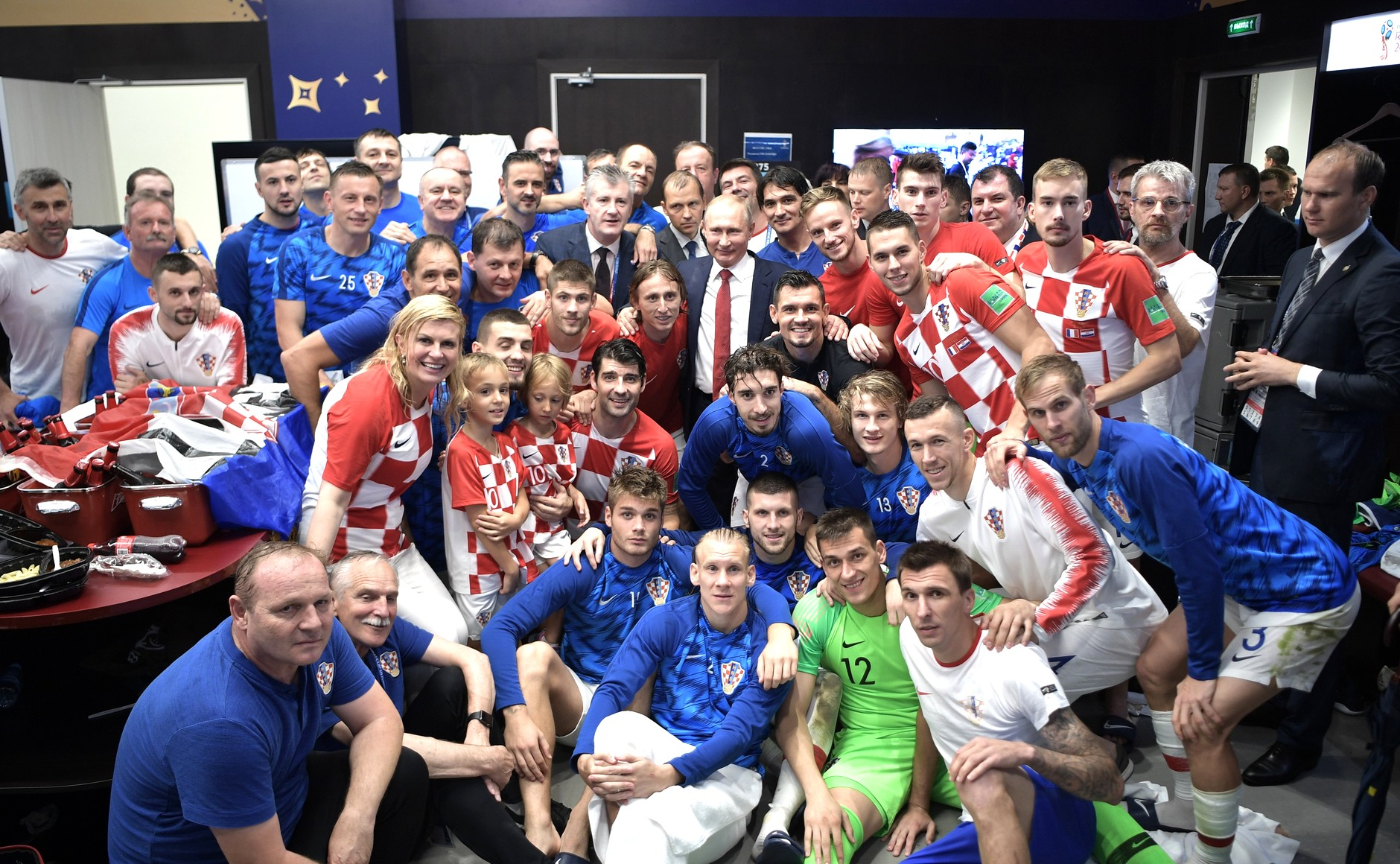
Croatia players posing with Vladimir Putin and Kolinda Grabar-Kitarović after the 2018 FIFA World Cup Final

The Croatia national football team of the late 2010s was thought of as the "Second Coming of the Golden Generation"; in reference to the Golden Generation of Croatia from the late 1990s who won the bronze medal in at the 1998 FIFA World Cup, Croatia's debut at the World Cup.

Following the appointment of manager Zlatko Dalić in October 2017, Croatia experienced one of the most successful periods in its history, combining an experienced midfield with a new generation of defenders and attackers. The team, under the leadership of captain Luka Modrić and the style of play by key players such as Mario Mandžukić, Ivan Rakitić, Ivan Perišić, Vedran Ćorluka and Mateo Kovačić reached the 2018 FIFA World Cup Final, losing to France 4–2. Captain Luka Modrić won the FIFA World Cup Golden Ball as the tournament's best player and later became the first Croatian footballer to win the Ballon d'Or, ending the decade-long dominance of Lionel Messi and Cristiano Ronaldo. The squad were praised for their performance at the World Cup. The team made it to the semi-finals of the 2022 FIFA World Cup before losing 3–0 to Argentina in the semi-finals and then subsequently winning 2–1 against Morocco in the 3rd place playoff. With a silver medal in 2018 and a bronze medal in 2022, Croatia became one of only a handful of nations to reach multiple FIFA World Cup podium finishes within a five-year span. Despite having a population of fewer than four million, the country established itself as one of the most consistent national teams of the era. The team made it to the final of the 2023 UEFA Nations League, but ultimately lost to Spain 5–4 on penalties after Lovro Majer and Bruno Petkovic missed their penalties during the shootout. The latter years of the generation also saw the emergence of younger players such as Joško Gvardiol, who was named in the FIFA World Cup All-Star Team in 2022 and was widely regarded as one of the world's best young defenders.

==== Denmark (1981–1992) ====
Starting with the appointment of Sepp Piontek as the head coach of the Danish national football team in 1979, the team achieved remarkable results, including a 3–1 win against reigning World Champions Italy in 1981, a 1–0 win against England at Wembley Stadium, before qualifying for the 1986 FIFA World Cup in Mexico, the first time ever in Danish football history. During the 1986 World Cup, the Danish team won all three group stage matches, including a remarkable 6–1 win against Uruguay, and the team was nicknamed "Danish Dynamite" following a chant introduced in 1983.

Sepp Piontek left the team in 1990. Following this, the team failed to qualify for UEFA Euro 1992. However, due to the Yugoslav Wars, Denmark took Yugoslavia's place in the tournament, eventually winning the tournament following a 2–0 win against Germany in the final.

==== England (2001–2007) ====
During the reign of Sven-Göran Eriksson, Adam Crozier, the chief executive of the Football Association and some members of the British media, touted players such as David Beckham, Paul Scholes, Michael Owen, and Steven Gerrard as the nucleus of a potential Golden Generation team. Despite some impressive performances such as the 2001 Germany v England football match in the 2002 World Cup qualifiers and the individual players' successes at club level, inconsistency resulted in this group of players failing to live up to expectations, resulting in the group becoming synonymous with disappointment and failed potential.

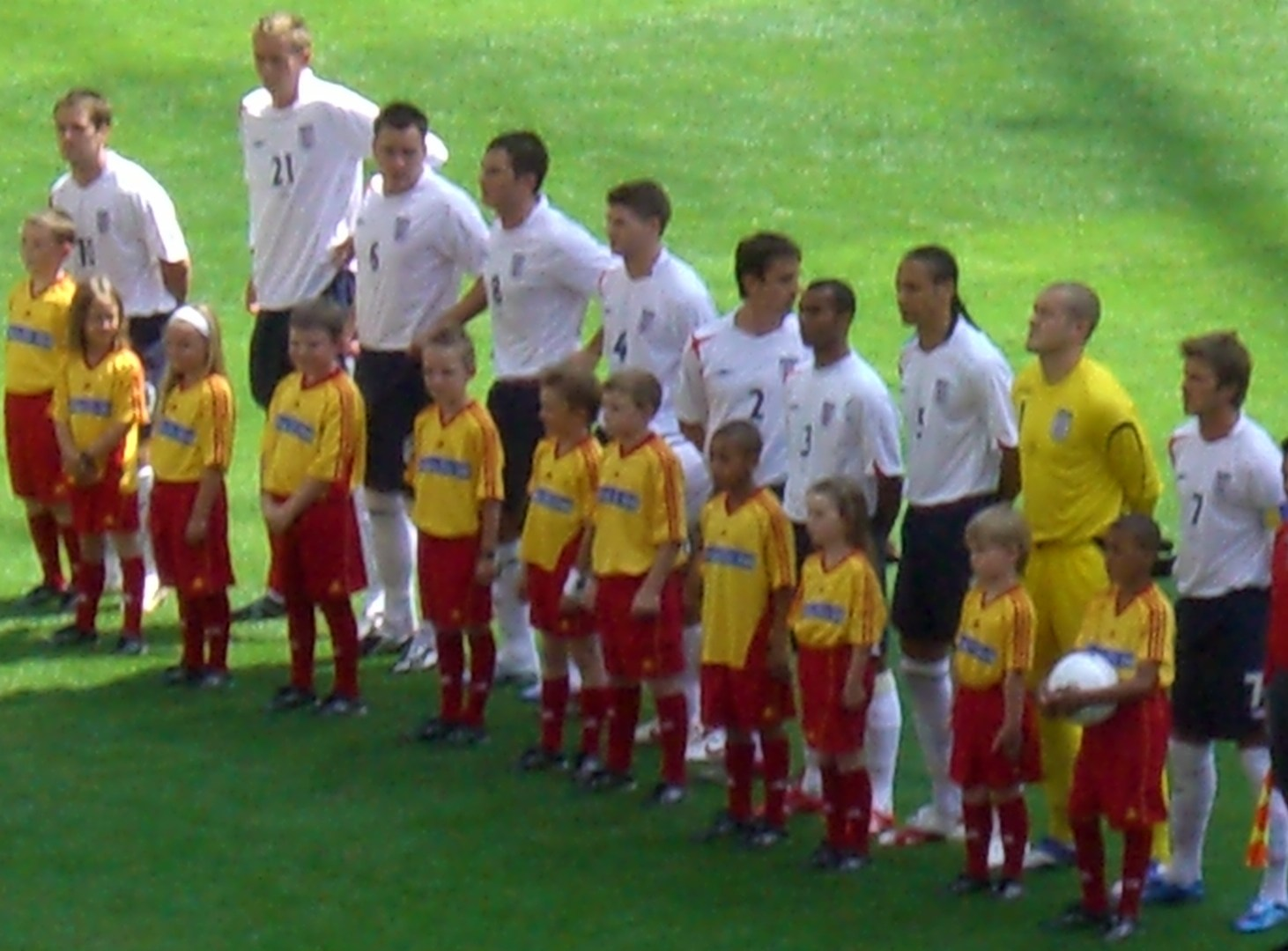
England at the 2006 FIFA World Cup. From left to right: Michael Owen, Peter Crouch, John Terry, Frank Lampard, Steven Gerrard, Gary Neville, Ashley Cole, Rio Ferdinand, Paul Robinson and David Beckham.

After Eriksson left in 2006 and Steve McClaren became manager, although many of the players continued to achieve success with their respective clubs, the team failed to qualify for UEFA Euro 2008, only the second time England failed to qualify for a major tournament in over 20 years (of the last 12 major tournaments). Rio Ferdinand claimed that the pressure of the "Golden Generation" tag had a negative effect on the players, restricting their ability to perform to their full potential for the national team. In 2017, Pep Guardiola said he could not understand why England did not achieve more with players such as Wayne Rooney, David Beckham, Paul Scholes, Michael Owen, Alan Shearer, Frank Lampard, Steven Gerrard, John Terry, Gary Neville, Rio Ferdinand, Ashley Cole, and Joe Cole, and claimed they were on the same level as Spain's golden generation of 2008–2014.

==== France (1998–2006, 2016–present) ====
In late 1998, the France national football team began a period of international dominance defeating Brazil 3–0 to win the 1998 FIFA World Cup, becoming the first French team to win the World Cup. Two years later, David Trezeguet's golden goal in extra time gave France a 2–1 win over Italy to give France the 2000 European Championship. France was subsequently ranked No. 1 in the FIFA World Rankings and ranked No. 1 in the World Football Elo Ratings for two years. The team also secured the 2001 FIFA Confederations Cup. Despite this impressive recent record, the French team flopped at the 2002 FIFA World Cup, losing to newcomers Senegal in the opening match of the tournament and crashing out in the group stages without scoring a single goal and taking only one point from their three games. A year later they were successful at the 2003 FIFA Confederations Cup, winning the competition after beating Cameroon in the final thanks to a golden goal from Thierry Henry. They also reached the World Cup final in Berlin at the 2006 FIFA World Cup, where they lost to Italy. The French golden team was composed of players such as Zinedine Zidane, Thierry Henry, David Trezeguet, Robert Pires, Youri Djorkaeff, Stéphane Guivarc'h, Christophe Dugarry, Jean-Pierre Papin, Eric Cantona, David Ginola-Ceze, Lilian Thuram, Laurent Blanc, Frank Leboeuf, Patrick Vieira, Didier Deschamps, Christian Karembeu, Alain Boghossian, Fabien Barthez, Bernard Lama, Emmanuel Petit, Marcel Desailly, Bixente Lizarazu, Vincent Guérin, Alain Roche, Florent Malouda, Sylvain Wiltord, Claude Makélélé, William Gallas, Eric Abidal, Willy Sagnol, Alou Diarra, and Franck Ribéry. Between 2006 and 2016, France underwhelmed in several international tournaments such as Euro 2008 and the 2010 World Cup, both in which they were knocked out in the group stages, only scoring one goal.

For the first time in 6 years, they reached the knockout stages of an international tournament advancing from the group stages of the 2012 Euros and the 2014 World Cup before being knocked out in the quarter-finals of both competitions by Spain and Germany respectively. In 2016, they reached the final of the Euros, with Antoine Griezmann being star player, being awarded player of the tournament and the golden boot. Then in 2018, they won the FIFA World Cup, beating Croatia 4–2 in the final and thus starting a new golden generation of players including Kylian Mbappé, Ousmane Dembélé, Bradley Barcola, Michael Olise, Désiré Doué, Paul Pogba, Antoine Griezmann, Dimitri Payet, Moussa Sissoko, Nabil Fekir, Anthony Martial, Kingsley Coman, Karim Benzema, Olivier Giroud, N'Golo Kanté, Aurélien Tchouaméni, Adrien Rabiot, Hugo Lloris, Patrice Evra, Laurent Koscielny, Lucas Digne, Benjamin Pavard, Lucas Hernandez, Théo Hernandez, William Saliba, Jules Koundé, Presnel Kimpembe, Samuel Umtiti, Raphaël Varane, and Blaise Matuidi. At the subsequent Euros, they were knocked out by Switzerland in the round of 16 but then won the Nations League in 2021, beating Spain in the final with goals from Karim Benzema, and Kylian Mbappe. In 2022, they reached the World Cup final but eventually lost to Argentina on penalties, despite Kylian Mbappe scoring a hat-trick in the final, being the first player to do so since Geoff Hurst in 1966 against West Germany. In 2024, France reached the semi-finals of the Euro 2024 despite not scoring a goal from open play in their previous games, owing to the solidity of their defence. However, the team subsequently lost 2–1 to Spain.

==== Germany (2006–2018) ====
Following disappointing performances at UEFA Euro 2000 and UEFA Euro 2004, despite reaching the 2002 FIFA World Cup Final, the Germany national football team underwent a significant restructuring of its youth development system and playing philosophy. Under managers Jürgen Klinsmann and later Joachim Löw, a new generation emerged that combined Germany's traditional tactical discipline with a more technical and attacking style of play.

Germany reached the semi-finals of the 2006 FIFA World Cup and the final of UEFA Euro 2008, losing to the eventual champions on both occasions. While experienced players such as Miroslav Klose, Lukas Podolski, Philipp Lahm, Bastian Schweinsteiger, and Per Mertesacker formed the backbone of the team, the emergence of Manuel Neuer, Jérôme Boateng, Mats Hummels, Sami Khedira, Mesut Özil, İlkay Gündoğan, Toni Kroos, Mario Gómez, Thomas Müller, Mario Götze, and later Marco Reus established Germany as one of the strongest national teams in the world.

Under Löw, Germany reached at least the semi-finals in six consecutive major tournaments: the 2006 FIFA World Cup, UEFA Euro 2008, 2010 FIFA World Cup, UEFA Euro 2012, 2014 FIFA World Cup and UEFA Euro 2016, a level of consistency unmatched by any other national team during the period.

The generation reached its peak at the 2014 FIFA World Cup, where Germany won their fourth World Cup title and their first since German reunification by defeating Argentina 1–0 after extra time, with Mario Götze scoring the winning goal in the final. Earlier in the tournament, Germany defeated tournament hosts Brazil 7–1 in the semi-finals, a result widely regarded as one of the greatest upsets in World Cup history. During this period, Germany also reached first place in the FIFA Men's World Ranking for the first time since 1994.

The era came to an end with Germany's surprise group-stage elimination at the 2018 FIFA World Cup, the nation's earliest World Cup exit since 1938. The tournament was followed by the international retirement of Mesut Özil and the temporary exclusion of Thomas Müller, Jérôme Boateng, and Mats Hummels from the national team, marking the conclusion of one of the most successful generations in German football history.

==== Hungary (1950–1956) ====
Between 1950 and 1956, the team recorded 42 victories, 7 draws and just one defeat, in the 1954 World Cup final against West Germany. Under the Elo rating system they achieved the highest rating recorded by a national side (2230 points, 30 June 1954.

The team was built around a core of six key players: forwards Ferenc Puskás, Sándor Kocsis and Zoltán Czibor, defensive midfielder József Bozsik, and goalkeeper Gyula Grosics, all Kispest Honvéd players, as well as MTK offensive midfielder Nándor Hidegkuti.

==== Italy (1960-1970, 1998–2010) ====
During the decade of the 1960s Italian football was in a renaissance with its identity becoming heavily linked with the play style of Catenaccio. This era saw many exceptional players and teams that had success in Europe with this carrying over to the national team on all fronts, goalkeepers Dino Zoff and Enrico Albertosi, defenders Giacinto Facchetti, Sandro Salvadore, Roberto Rosato and Tarcisio Burgnich, midfielders Gianni Rivera and Giovanni Lodetti, and attackers Gigi Riva, Sandro Mazzola and Angelo Domenghini. This group was at first unlucky, being eliminated in the group stage of both the 1962 and 1966 FIFA World Cups. They would then have a run of success, hosting and winning Euro 1968 and reaching the final of the 1970 FIFA World Cup where they lost to Brazil. The latter tournament also featuring the Azzurri’s famous semi-final victory over Germany, known as The game of the Century.

The generation of Italian players during the late 1990s and early 2000s was renowned for its elite defense, most notably consisting of Paolo Maldini, Fabio Cannavaro, Alessandro Nesta, Gianluca Zambrotta, and goalkeeper Gianluigi Buffon. Other key players included Alessandro Del Piero, Christian Vieri, Francesco Totti, Filippo Inzaghi, Gennaro Gattuso, Andrea Pirlo, Mauro Camoranesi and Marco Materazzi. The squad combined one of the strongest defensive units in football history with a technically gifted midfield and experienced attacking players, making Italy one of the favourites at every major international tournament during the period.

This group of players reached their first major final at UEFA Euro 2000, losing to France in extra time after conceding the golden goal. After a round of 16 elimination at the 2002 FIFA World Cup and a group stage exit at UEFA Euro 2004, both under controversial circumstances, they recovered to win the 2006 FIFA World Cup, Italy's fourth world title. During the tournament Italy conceded only two goals in seven matches—an own goal against the United States and a penalty in the final against France—keeping five clean sheets.

Captain Fabio Cannavaro won the Ballon d'Or in 2006 after captaining Italy to World Cup glory, becoming only the third defender to receive the award, while Gianluigi Buffon was awarded the Lev Yashin Award as the tournament's best goalkeeper and Andrea Pirlo received the Bronze Ball for his performances throughout the competition.

Following the triumph in Germany, several members of the generation retired from international football over the following years. Italy reached the quarter-finals of UEFA Euro 2008 before the core of the squad gradually dispersed, marking the end of one of the most successful generations in the nation's football history. Although Italy later won UEFA Euro 2020, that triumph was achieved by a largely different generation of players.

After Italy's win in 2006 the team begin suffering poor results including being eliminated at the Euro 2008 quarterfinals and suffering group stage eliminations in the 2010 and 2014 World Cups and didn't qualify for the 2018 World Cup. They would win the Euro 2020 but followed it up by failing to qualify for the 2022 and 2026 World Cups.

==== Netherlands (1972–1978, 1994–2000, 2004–2014) ====
During the 1970s, the team adopted the Total Football (Dutch: Totaalvoetbal) strategy pioneered by Ajax, and led by playmaker Johan Cruyff and national team head coach Rinus Michels. The Netherlands made significant strides, qualifying for two World Cup finals in the decade. Carlos Alberto, captain of the Brazilian team that won the 1970 FIFA World Cup said: "The only team I've seen that did things differently was Holland at the 1974 World Cup in West Germany. Since then everything looks more or less the same to me ... Their 'carousel' style of play was amazing to watch and marvelous for the game."

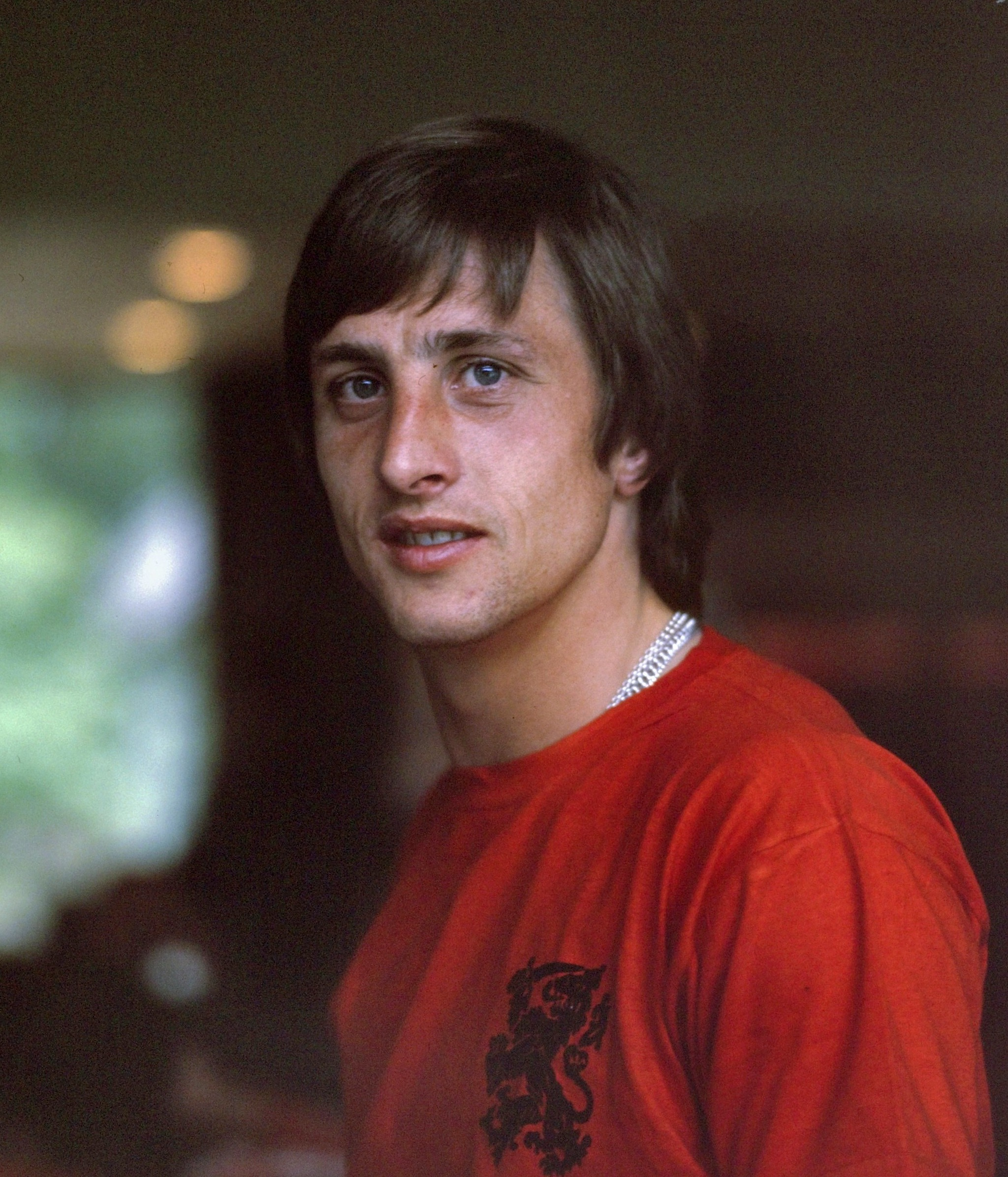
Johan Cruyff, often considered the greatest Dutch player of all time

The team reached consecutive FIFA World Cup finals in 1974 and 1978, losing to West Germany and Argentina, respectively. They also reached the semi-finals of UEFA Euro 1976.

Alongside Cruyff, key players included Jan van Beveren, Ruud Krol, Johan Neeskens, Willem van Hanegem, Willy van de Kerkhof, René van de Kerkhof, Willy van der Kuijlen, Rob Rensenbrink, Johnny Rep, Piet Keizer, Willy Brokamp, Kees Kist, and Ruud Geels. Their tactical influence extended far beyond results, with many historians regarding the 1974 Dutch side as one of the greatest teams never to win the World Cup.

A new generation emerged during the mid-1990s, featuring Dennis Bergkamp, Edgar Davids, Clarence Seedorf, Patrick Kluivert, Marc Overmars, Roy Makaay, Ronald de Boer, Frank de Boer, Danny Blind, Jaap Stam, and Edwin van der Sar. After talks between Cruyff and the KNVB broke down, Advocaat remained in charge of the national team for the 1994 World Cup in the United States. In the World Cup, Van Basten and striker Ruud Gullit were injured; Dennis Bergkamp led the team with three goals and the Netherlands advanced to the quarter-finals, where they lost 3–2 to eventual champions Brazil.

The Netherlands reached the quarter-finals of the 1994 FIFA World Cup before progressing to the semi-finals of the 1998 FIFA World Cup, where they lost to Brazil on penalties. With Guus Hiddink as manager, Holland went to Euro 1996. After finishing second in their group, they played France in the quarter-finals. With the score 0–0, the match went to penalties. Clarence Seedorf's shot in the fourth round was stopped by French goalkeeper Bernard Lama, and the penalty by Laurent Blanc eliminated the Netherlands. At UEFA Euro 2000, co-hosted by the Netherlands, the team produced some of the tournament's most impressive football but was eliminated by Italy in the semi-finals after missing several penalties. Although widely regarded as one of the most talented Dutch squads assembled, the generation failed to win a major international title.

The third Dutch Golden Generation emerged during the mid-2000s, led by Ruud van Nistelrooy, Arjen Robben, Wesley Sneijder, Robin van Persie, Mark van Bommel, Dirk Kuyt, Klaas-Jan Huntelaar, Rafael van der Vaart, and Giovanni van Bronckhorst.

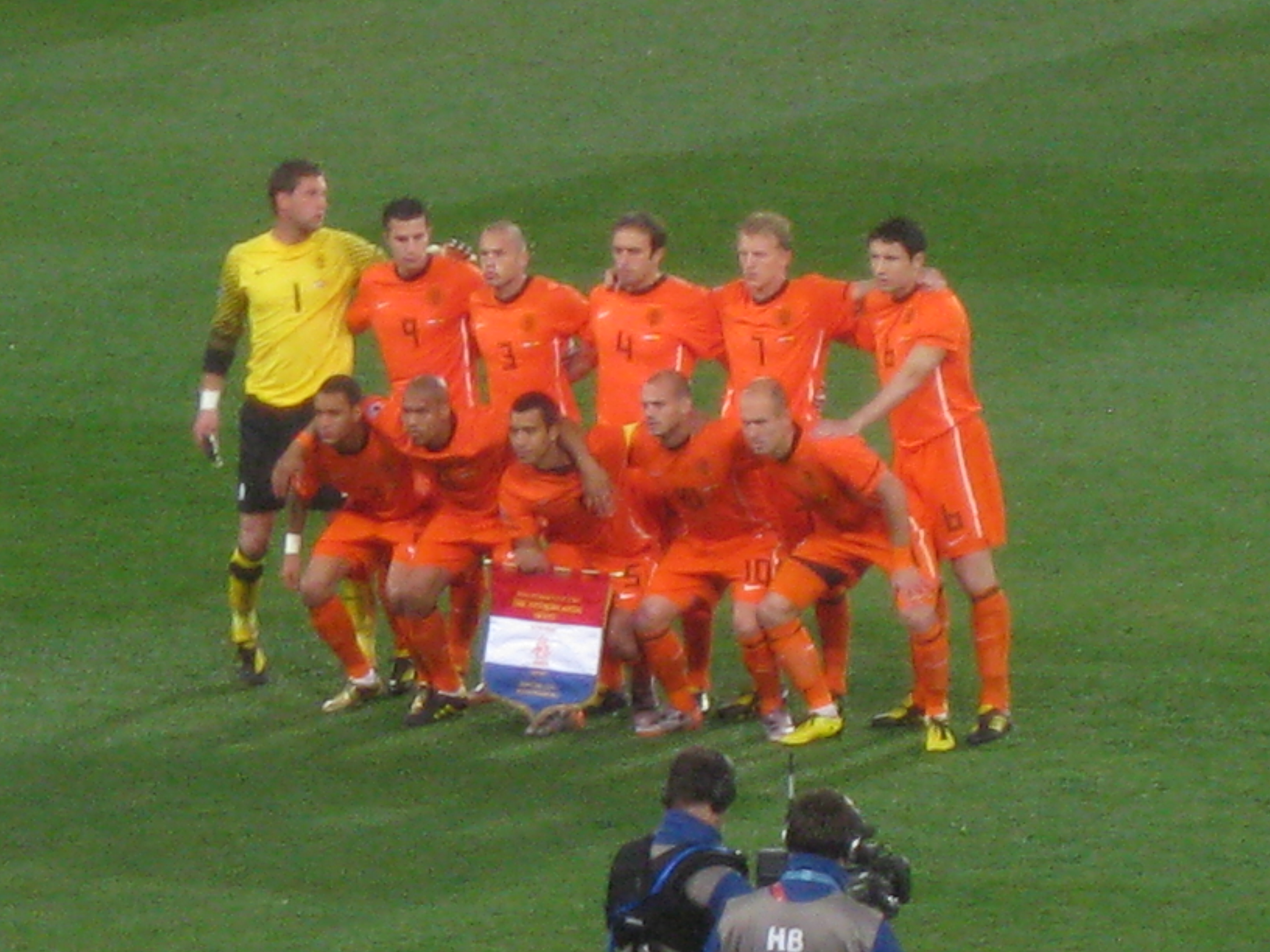
Dutch national team moments before kick-off of the 2010 World Cup final

After reaching the semi-finals of UEFA Euro 2004, the team developed into one of the world's strongest sides under Bert van Marwijk. Their greatest achievement came at the 2010 FIFA World Cup, where they reached the final before losing 1–0 to Spain after extra time. From August to September 2011, the team was ranked number one in the FIFA World Ranking, becoming the second national football team, after Spain, to top the ranking without previously winning a World Cup.

Following a disappointing campaign at UEFA Euro 2012, In the 2014 FIFA World Cup, in the semi-final against Argentina, the Netherlands were eliminated 4–2 on penalties. The Netherlands won the third place match against hosts Brazil. Van Gaal, who successfully motivated the team after their semi-final elimination, received praise for getting more out of the young and inexperienced Netherlands squad than many expected. the Netherlands recovered under Louis van Gaal to finish third at the 2014 FIFA World Cup, highlighted by a 5–1 victory over defending champions Spain. Emerging players such as Memphis Depay, Virgil van Dijk, and Frenkie de Jong signalled the beginning of a new cycle.

==== Norway (2019–present) ====
The late 2010's experienced a renaissance of Norwegian football, giving rise to a "Golden Generation" that has improved the Norway national football team. For over two decades, the country struggled to qualify for major tournaments, but recently they have improved on the global stage. Leading this revival is Erling Haaland, who became Norway's all-time leading goal scorer. Along with Haaland, midfielder and team captain Martin Ødegaard provides stability and creativity. This generation has seen other players above the level of previous teams, such as forwards Alexander Sørloth and Jørgen Strand Larsen, midfielders like Sander Berge, defenders like Julian Ryerson, and young wingers Antonio Nusa and Oscar Bobb.

On 17 June 2026, Norway opened its World Cup campaign with a 4–1 victory over Iraq, highlighted by two goals from Haaland, who became the first Norwegian player to score multiple goals in a World Cup match. The team followed up with a 3–2 win against Senegal, securing advancement to the Round of 32 prior to its final group-stage match against France. In the Round of 32, Norway won 2-1 against Ivory Coast and advanced to the Round of 16 match against Brazil. This was the first time Norway won a match outside the group stages. Norway is one of only three national teams with a winning record against Brazil, and the only team to never have lost against them, with three wins and two draws in five matches, including their 2026 round of 16 match.

==== Portugal (2000–2006, 2019–2026) ====
Portugal won consecutive FIFA World Youth Championships in 1989 and 1991, producing a generation of players that became known as the Geração de Ouro ("Golden Generation"). Subsequently, Portugal's senior team reached the semi-finals of UEFA Euro 2000, finished runners-up at UEFA Euro 2004 on home soil, and reached the semi-finals of the 2006 FIFA World Cup, establishing Portugal as one of Europe's strongest national teams. Although widely praised for their technical quality, some commentators have argued that the generation underachieved by failing to win a major international trophy. The squad featured players such as Luís Figo, Rui Costa, Rui Barros, Pauleta, Nuno Gomes, Domingos, João Pinto, Simão, António Folha, Paulo Futre, Sérgio Conceição, Capucho, Rui Águas, Jorge Cadete, Vítor Baía, Ricardo, Paulo Sousa, Costinha, Petit, Maniche, Tiago Mendes, Fernando Couto, Ricardo Carvalho, Jorge Andrade, Fernando Meira, Jorge Costa, João Pinto, Paulo Ferreira, Rui Jorge, Deco, and a young Cristiano Ronaldo, who bridged the transition into Portugal's next successful era.

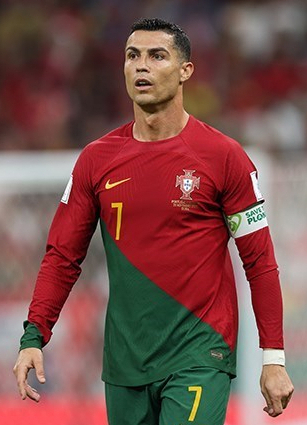
Portugal's Cristiano Ronaldo, the current holder of the men's international appearance record

After Euro 2004 ended, many players belonging to the Geração de Ouro (Golden Generation), abandoned their international footballing careers, with only Luís Figo remaining in the team, despite a temporary retirement. The silver lining for Portugal was the emergence of Cristiano Ronaldo, who was selected in the UEFA Euro All-Star team. While Portugal were playing in the competition, Scolari agreed in a new two-year deal with the Federation. In 2006 World Cup, Portugal drew 0–0 after extra time with England in the quarter-final, but won 3–1 on penalties to reach their first World Cup semi-final since 1966. Portugal lost the semi-final 1–0 against France, and were then defeated 3–1 by the tournament hosts, Germany, in the third-place play-off match.

Following victory at UEFA Euro 2016, led by players such as Rui Patrício, Pepe, Bruno Alves, Fábio Coentrão, William Carvalho, João Moutinho, Pizzi, Renato Sanches, Ricardo Quaresma, Nani, and Eder, Portugal entered a new golden generation built around the experienced Cristiano Ronaldo and an emerging core of players developed through the country's renowned academies. The team won the inaugural 2018–19 UEFA Nations League, defeating the Netherlands in the final. Following the appointment of Roberto Martinez as head coach in January 2023, Portugal enjoyed one of the most dominant qualification campaigns in their history. They recorded their biggest-ever international victory with a 9–0 win over Luxembourg, became the first Portuguese side to win all ten matches in a UEFA European Championship qualifying campaign, and qualified for UEFA Euro 2024 with a perfect record while setting new national records for goals scored and goals conceded in qualification. Alongside Ronaldo, this generation includes Bruno Fernandes, Bernardo Silva, João Moutinho, Nélson Semedo, João Cancelo, Rúben Dias, Gonçalo Inácio, Rafael Leão, Diogo Jota, João Félix, Diogo Costa, Rúben Neves, Diogo Dalot, Raphaël Guerreiro, Nuno Mendes, João Neves, Vitinha, João Palhinha, Francisco Trincão, Francisco Conceição, Gonçalo Ramos, and Pedro Neto.

At UEFA Euro 2024, Portugal reached the quarter-finals after defeating Slovenia in a penalty shootout in which goalkeeper Diogo Costa saved all three Slovenian penalties, before being eliminated by France on penalties. The team subsequently won the 2024–25 UEFA Nations League, defeating Spain on penalties in the final to claim Portugal's second UEFA Nations League title, reinforcing the status of a new generation built around both experienced leaders and emerging talent.

In the 2026 World Cup, Portugal were drawn into Group K with Colombia, DR Congo, and Uzbekistan. On June 17, they tied their opener against DR Congo 1–1 despite completing 724 passes, their most in a World Cup match. Portugal were eliminated in the round of 16 following a 1–0 defeat to Spain, with Mikel Merino scoring the match-winning goal in stoppage time; the day prior to the match, Ronaldo had stated that this would be his final edition of the tournament, leading to speculation in the media over his future. Martínez also announced his resignation with immediate effect after this match.

==== Romania (1984–2000) ====
The Romania Golden Generation (Generația de Aur) refers to the period between 1984 and 2000 during which the Romania national football team achieved its greatest international successes. The era is widely regarded as the strongest in the country's history, marked by consistent qualification for major tournaments, notable victories over top nations, and a peak of third place in the FIFA World Rankings in September 1997.

The era began with Romania’s qualification for UEFA Euro 1984, where they finished ahead of reigning world champions Italy, ending a long absence from major tournaments. Throughout the 1980s, Romanian football grew steadily, supported by strong club performances in Europe. Universitatea Craiova reached the semi-finals of the UEFA Cup in the 1982–83 season, while Dinamo Bucharest reached the semi-finals of the 1983–84 European Cup. This period of club success was further highlighted by the international achievements of Steaua, which won the European Cup in 1986 and reached additional European finals and semi-finals during the decade. These accomplishments provided the foundation for the national team's rise on the international stage.

Led in the 1990s by Gheorghe Hagi and a generation that included Gheorghe Popescu, Miodrag Belodedici, Dan Petrescu, Ilie Dumitrescu, Florin Răducioiu, and Adrian Ilie, Romania became one of Europe's strongest national teams. They reached the Round of 16 at the 1990 FIFA World Cup and the quarter-finals at the 1994 FIFA World Cup, being eliminated in penalty shootouts in both tournaments. At the 1998 FIFA World Cup, they finished first in their group ahead of England and Colombia.

The final major appearance of the generation came at UEFA Euro 2000, where Romania advanced from a group featuring Germany, England, and Portugal before being eliminated by Italy in the quarter-finals. This tournament marked the end of Romania's strongest competitive cycle on the international stage.

==== Russia (2008–2018) ====
After failing to qualify for the 2006 FIFA World Cup Russia surprised many by reaching the semi-finals of UEFA Euro 2008, beating the Netherlands in the quarter-finals. The Russian squad featured Andrey Arshavin, Roman Pavlyuchenko, Diniyar Bilyaletdinov, Yuri Zhirkov. All of them went on to play for EPL clubs. With Arshavin finishing 6th at 2008 Ballon d'Or.

The success did not last, with the team failing to qualify for the 2010 FIFA World Cup. Manager Guus Hiddink was outed shortly after. But neither with Dick Advocaat, nor Fabio Capello Russia never made it past the group stage in the following three tournaments.

Russia reached the quarter-finals at 2018 FIFA World Cup while beating Spain on penalties. That team consisted of 2008 players such as Igor Akinfeev who saved the decisive penalty, and Sergei Ignashevich. Also included brand new talents such as Aleksandr Golovin, Artem Dzyuba, Aleksei Miranchuk, and Denis Cheryshev who was featured in the team of the tournament.

==== Spain (2006–2014, 2021–present) ====
After the 2006 FIFA World Cup Spain began focusing on new skills and new techniques for the team. Spain began a winning streak from 2006 through 2009 along with the Spanish players this generation of players playing a unique brand of football at the time, with tiki-taka helping them dominate world football for years.

This golden generation was filled with players most notably including, Iker Casillas, Xavi, Andrés Iniesta, Sergio Ramos, Carles Puyol,Cesc Fàbregas, Sergio Busquets, David Villa, Fernando Torres, Gerard Piqué, Xabi Alonso, David Silva and Jordi Alba, and helped Spain win the UEFA European Championship in 2008 and 2012, and the FIFA World Cup in 2010, making them the first team ever to win the World Cup and both continental championships either side of it. They also reached the final of the 2013 FIFA Confederations Cup. During this time, Spain dominated the FIFA World Rankings, topping the rankings almost uninterrupted for six years, between July 2008 and July 2014 when Spain officially ended their generation at the 2014 FIFA World Cup after suffering a disastrous group stage elimination.

During the delayed UEFA Euro 2020, Spain under Luis Enrique reached the semi-finals, narrowly losing to eventual champions Italy on penalties. Led by veterans such as Sergio Busquets, Jordi Alba, and Álvaro Morata, Spain also saw the rise of young talents including Unai Simón, Rodri, Pedri, Gavi, Dani Olmo, Fabián Ruiz, Mikel Oyarzabal, and Ferran Torres, before finishing runners-up in the 2021 UEFA Nations League Finals and suffering a Round of 16 exit to Morocco at the 2022 FIFA World Cup, leading to Enrique’s departure and Busquets’ international retirement. Under new manager Luis de la Fuente, Spain evolved further, and the core was transformed by the breakthrough of the Euro 2024 additions—especially Lamine Yamal, alongside key reinforcements Nico Williams, Mikel Merino, and Marc Cucurella—with Yamal standing out as a generational talent who became central to Spain’s attacking identity, as they went on to win UEFA Euro 2024, defeating opponents with decisive goals from Williams and Mikel Oyarzabal, while Yamal’s influence defined the tournament’s breakthrough narrative as he later won the Golden Boy, alongside Dani Olmo’s Golden Boot and Rodri’s Golden Ball and that years Ballon d’Or, before Spain reached the 2025 UEFA Nations League Finals, eventually losing to Portugal on penalties after further squad development including Dean Huijsen and Martín Zubimendi. Spain would go on to win the 2026 FIFA World Cup after a 1–0 victory over Argentina.

==== Sweden (1948–1958) ====
The late 1940s and 1950s was the golden era in Swedish football when the Sweden men's national football team achieved unprecedented results. They participated in two World Cups and two Olympic Games and did win a medal every time, each time under English coach George Raynor. It started in 1948 Summer Olympics when Sweden won every game and beat Yugoslavia with 3–1 in the final. Striker Gunnar Nordahl was the tournament top scorer and was recruited by Italian giants AC Milan. Nordahl was later joined by Gunnar Gren and Nils Liedholm where the trio was named Gre-No-Li.

The Swedish FA had a strict amateur policy and did not allow professional players in the national team but Sweden still managed to end up with a bronze medal in 1950 World Cup. After this more players from Sweden like Hasse Jeppson, Karl-Erik Palmér, Stig "Vittjärv" Sundqvist and Lennart "Nacka" Skoglund ended up in European clubs, mostly in Italy. 1952 Summer Olympics resulted in a new bronze medal but without their top players, Sweden could not qualify for the 1954 World Cup.

Since Sweden was hosting the 1958 World Cup, the team was automatically qualified. After poor results ahead of the tournament, Swedish FA finally allowed professional players and the World Cup squad contained Nils Liedholm, Kurt Hamrin, Arne Selmosson, Lennart "Nacka" Skoglund and Bengt "Julle" Gustavsson along with former professional Gunnar Gren. The World Cup ended with a silver medal after a defeat against Brazil in the final game. Key players like Agne Simonsson and Orvar Bergmark was later sold abroad but this was the end of a golden era and Sweden did not participate in any championships during the 1960s.

==== Yugoslavia (1987–1992) ====
Yugoslavia's generation of young footballers won the 1987 FIFA World Youth Championship and finished runner-up at the 1990 UEFA European Under-21 Championship. The nation then reached the quarter-finals of the 1990 FIFA World Cup and, a year later, a Red Star Belgrade team featuring many of the national team's stars became the first Yugoslav side to ever win the European Cup. Yugoslavia qualified for UEFA Euro 1992 with seven wins from eight matches and the best goalscoring record and goal difference of any team during the qualifying phase. However, the team was disqualified prior to the tournament due to the Yugoslav Wars (it was replaced by the eventual champion, Denmark) and did not play together again after the country's division. Several players from the Yugoslav team went on to finish in third place at the 1998 World Cup with Croatia. This pre-dissolution golden generation in soccer was also mirrored by a golden generation of Yugoslav basketball that won the 1990 FIBA World Championship. Notable players from this generation include Alen Bokšić, Robert Prosinečki, Igor Štimac, Robert Jarni, Dejan Savićević, Predrag Mijatović, Siniša Mihajlović, Davor Šuker, Zvonimir Boban and Vladimir Jugović.

=== Africa ===
==== Algeria (1980–1991; 2014–2022) ====
The Algerian team of the 1980s has been dubbed the "golden generation", or the "first golden generation" of Algerian football. In fact, the team included the likes of Lakhdar Belloumi, Rabah Madjer, Tedj Bensaoula, Mustapha Dahleb, Ali Fergani and Mehdi Cerbah, later joined by the likes of Moussa Saïb and Cherif Oudjani. This squad is mainly known for its first two appearances at the World Cup. On its debut in 1982, they surprised everyone by beating reigning European champions West Germany 2–1. After a 0–2 loss against Austria, they won their second ever game against Chile. However, the desert foxes would fail to qualify after Germany later beat Austria 1–0, in extremely dubious circumstances, in a game dubbed, the "Disgrace of Gijón". This game prompted FIFA to schedule the last group games of future World Cups at the same time to avoid any potential match-fixing case. Algeria appeared at the next World Cup. However, drawn in a tough group together with Brazil and Spain, they only managed to grab one point, a 1–1 draw against Northern Ireland. On their second game, they held off Brazilian attackers until the 66th minute, the longest any team would manage at the tournament. On the continental scene, Algeria reached the semi-finals of 5 out of 6 AFCONs, winning the 1990 edition on home soil against Nigeria, which had previously knocked them out in 1980 and 1988. Their last achievement would be the 1991 Afro-Asian Cup against Iran.

The Algeria side that reached the Round of 16 at the 2014 FIFA World Cup is often regarded as the “second golden generation” of Algerian football, following the iconic teams of the 1980s. Led by players such as Madjid Bougherra, Sofiane Feghouli, Islam Slimani, Yacine Brahimi, and goalkeeper Raïs M'Bolhi, Algeria produced one of the nation’s greatest World Cup campaigns, famously pushing eventual champions Germany to extra time before narrowly losing in the Round of 16. After a difficult period that included failure to qualify for another World Cup and a disappointing group-stage exit at the 2017 Africa Cup of Nations, Algeria experienced a resurgence under coach Djamel Belmadi. With stars such as Riyad Mahrez, Ismaël Bennacer, Youcef Belaïli, and Baghdad Bounedjah, Algeria won the 2019 Africa Cup of Nations and later captured the 2021 FIFA Arab Cup with a squad largely composed of A’ team players and footballers based in Middle Eastern leagues, cementing the era as one of the most successful periods in modern Algerian football history.

However, this period would not last long as the senior team crashed out of the group stage of the following AFCON, ending a 35-game unbeaten streak, and failed to qualify for the 2022 FIFA World Cup in controversial circumstances.

==== Egypt (2006–2010) ====
Egypt's Golden Generation won three consecutive Africa Cup of Nations and beat Ivory Coast's Golden Generation in the Final of the 2006 Africa Cup of Nations and Algeria's growing Golden Generation in the semi-final of the 2010 Africa Cup of Nations, they also did one of the best performances in the 2009 FIFA Confederations Cup because they almost tied with Brazil in the opening match, won at the time World Champions Italy 1–0, and only losing to the United States. However, due to Egypt losing 1–0 in the tiebreaking play-off against Algeria, they failed to qualify for the 2010 FIFA World Cup. Key players are Mohamed Aboutrika, Essam El Hadary, Gedo, Hossam Hassan, Mohamed Zidan, and Ahmed Hassan, this generation was led by Hassan Shehata who is considered to be the greatest Egyptian national football team manager.

==== Ivory Coast (2006–2015) ====
Despite winning the 1992 edition of the Africa Cup of Nations, the country saw an outpouring of talent during the first half of the 2000s. The majority of this generation consisted of players who enjoyed considerable success in Europe. Led by Didier Drogba (who remains the national team's all-time leading goalscorer), several other players established themselves at some of Europe's biggest clubs, including brothers Yaya and Kolo Touré, Didier Zokora, Emmanuel Eboué, Cheick Tioté, Gervinho, Salomon Kalou, Wilfried Bony and Arthur Boka.

During this period, Ivory Coast qualified for their first three FIFA World Cup tournaments in 2006, 2010 and 2014, establishing themselves as one of Africa's strongest national teams. They were drawn into particularly difficult groups in both 2006 and 2010 alongside eventual finalists or champions, limiting their progress despite competitive performances.

The generation also reached the finals of the 2006 and 2012 Africa Cup of Nations, losing both on penalties to Egypt and Zambia, respectively, before finally ending the country's 23-year wait for a continental title by winning the 2015 Africa Cup of Nations. The team also reached the quarter-finals of the 2013 Africa Cup of Nations and finished as semifinalists at the 2011 African Nations Championship.

During the era, Ivory Coast reached a highest-ever FIFA World Ranking of 12th in the world in 2013 and were consistently the highest-ranked African nation for much of the late 2000s and early 2010s.

==== Morocco (2022–present) ====
Morocco made history at the 2022 FIFA World Cup by becoming the first African nation to reach the semi-finals, with a remarkable run built on defensive discipline and strong team unity under coach Walid Regragui. Their squad was anchored by standout players such as goalkeeper Yassine Bounou, full-backs Noussair Mazraoui and Achraf Hakimi, midfield engine Sofyan Amrabat, and creative leader Hakim Ziyech, all of whom played key roles in their historic campaign. With the addition of Brahim Diaz, Azzedine Ounahi, Ismael Saibiri and Neil El Aynaoui, They later continued their rise in African football by being crowned champions of the 2025 Africa Cup of Nations, with the final against Senegal decided in controversial circumstances after Senegal were unable to complete the match. Morocco’s success also extended to youth football, as they captured the bronze medal at the 2024 Olympics and gold at the 2025 FIFA U-20 World Cup, further establishing themselves as one of the continent’s emerging football powers.

During the 2026 FIFA World Cup they became the first african nation to reach the quarterfinals twice. As in the previous edition of the tournament they were knocked out by France.

=== South America ===
==== Argentina (2019–2026) ====
After the 2018 FIFA World Cup, in which Argentina were eliminated in the round of 16 and sacked boss Jorge Sampaoli, Lionel Scaloni was hired and reached the semi-finals of the Copa America in 2019 before winning it in 2021 and 2024. Between 2019 and 2022, Argentina went on the second longest international unbeaten streak in history of 36 matches but the 2022 FIFA World Cup showed how much the Argentinian squad have improved by winning it. This core of players consisted of Lionel Messi, Angel Di Maria, Rodrigo De Paul, Lautaro Martinez, Emiliano Martinez, Lisandro Martinez, Nahuel Molina, Marcos Acuna, Nicolas Otamendi, Paulo Dybala, Cristian Romero, Leandro Paredes, and later Alexis Mac Allister, Julian Alvarez, and Enzo Fernandez. In the 2026 FIFA World Cup, Argentina would make it all the way to the final once again but fell short losing 1-0 to Spain.

==== Brazil (1958–1970, 1982–1986, 1994–2006) ====
Brazil is widely regarded as having produced multiple golden generations throughout its history, reflecting the country's long-standing tradition of developing world-class footballers. Unlike many nations whose success is concentrated within a single era, Brazil has remained among international football's dominant powers across several decades, combining individual brilliance with an attacking style that has become synonymous with the national team.

The first and most celebrated generation, spanning 1958 to 1970, established Brazil as the world's premier football nation. Led by Pelé, Garrincha, Jairzinho, Carlos Alberto Torres, Tostão, Gérson and others, Brazil won three FIFA World Cup titles in 1958, 1962 and 1970. The 1970 side, in particular, is widely regarded as one of the greatest teams in football history, while Pelé became the only player to win three World Cups.

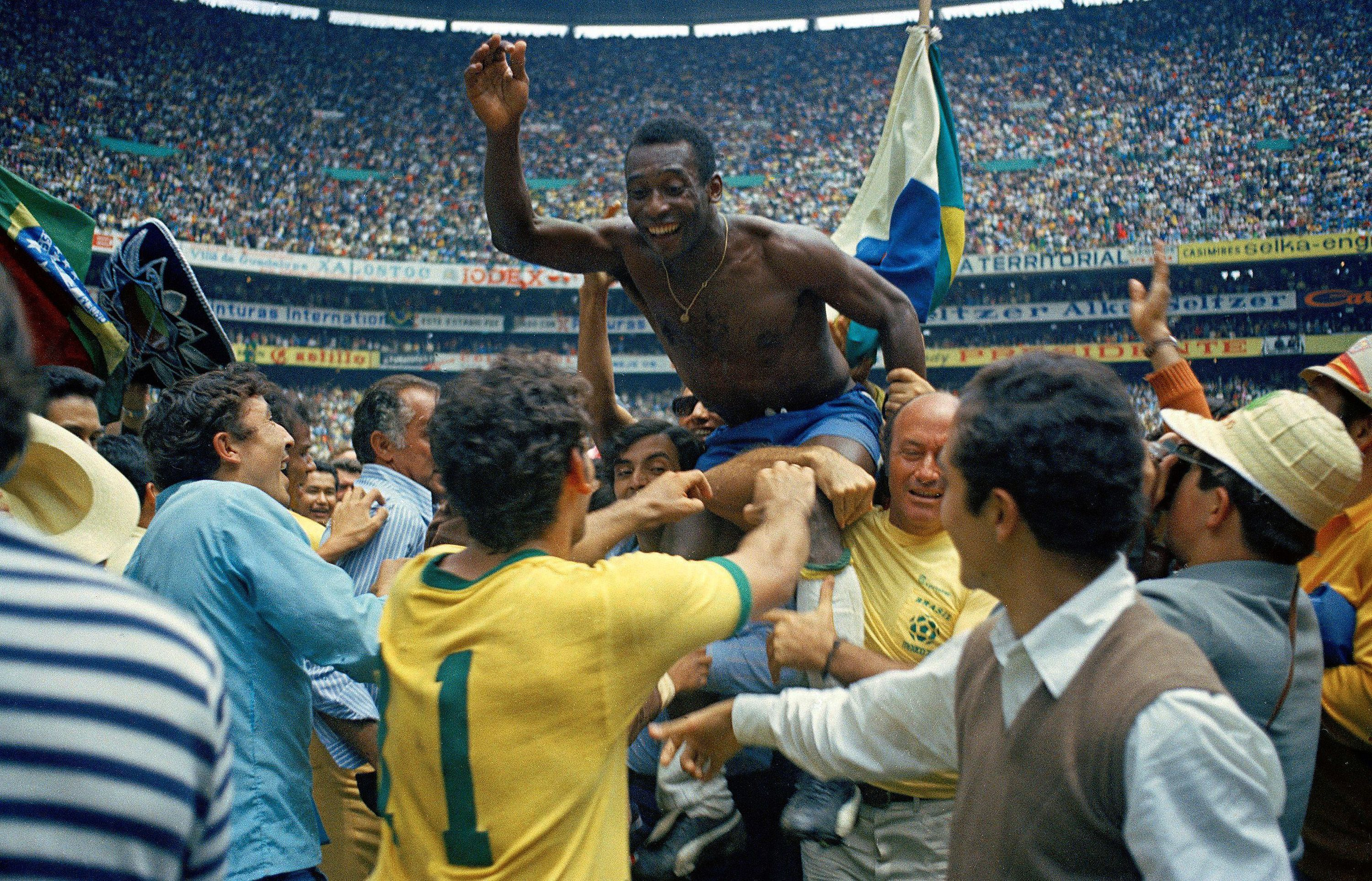
Pelé celebrating the World Cup win in 1970

A second generation emerged during the 1980s, centred around Zico, Sócrates, Falcão, Éder and later Careca. Although this team failed to win a major international trophy, it became renowned for its attractive attacking football and is frequently cited among the greatest national teams never to win the World Cup, particularly following its memorable performances at the 1982 FIFA World Cup.

The third modern golden generation restored Brazil to the summit of world football between 1994 and 2006. Featuring stars such as Romário, Bebeto, Ronaldo, Rivaldo, Ronaldinho, Kaká, Cafu, Roberto Carlos, Lúcio and Dida, Brazil won the 1994 FIFA World Cup, reached the 1998 final, captured the 2002 FIFA World Cup, and also won the 1997, 1999 and 2004 Copa América titles. During this era, Ronaldo, Rivaldo, Ronaldinho and Kaká all won the Ballon d'Or, reflecting the extraordinary individual quality within the squad.

==== Uruguay (2010–2018) ====
In 2010, however, a new generation of footballers, led by Luis Suárez, Diego Forlán and Edinson Cavani, formed a team considered to be Uruguay's best in the last four decades, catching international attention after finishing fourth in the 2010 World Cup. Uruguay opened the tournament with a goalless draw against France, followed by defeats of South Africa (3–0) in and Mexico (1–0) respectively, finishing at the top of their group with seven points. In the second round, they played South Korea, defeating them 2–1 with star striker Luis Suárez scoring a brace and earning Uruguay a spot in the quarter-finals for the first time since 1970. Against Ghana, the match finished 1–1, forcing the game into extra-time. Both sides had their chances at extra time but Suárez blocked the ball with his hand in the penalty area, earning Suárez a red card and earning Uruguay universal scorn. Ghana striker Asamoah Gyan missed the subsequent penalty, forcing the game to go into penalties where Uruguay would win 4–2, sending them into the last four. They played the Netherlands in the semi-finals but were beaten 3–2. For the third-place match, they played Germany, again losing 3–2. This placed Uruguay in fourth place for the tournament, their best result in 40 years. Diego Forlan was awarded the Player of The Tournament.

A year later, they won the Copa America for the first time in 16 years and broke the record for the most successful team in South America. Luis Suárez ended up as the Player of The Tournament. In the 2014 World Cup Uruguay was placed in Group D alongside Costa Rica, England, and Italy. They were upset by Costa Rica in the opening match, losing 3–1 despite taking the lead in the first half. They rebounded with a 2–1 victory over England, in which Suárez scored a brace right after coming back from an injury, and a 1–0 victory over Italy, placing them second in their group and earning a spot in the last 16. During the match against Italy, forward Luis Suárez bit Italian defender Giorgio Chiellini on his left shoulder. Two days after the match, the FIFA Disciplinary Committee banned Suárez for nine international matches, the longest such ban in World Cup history, exceeding the eight-match ban handed to Italy's Mauro Tassotti for breaking the nose of Spain's Luis Enrique in 1994. Suárez was also banned from taking part in any football-related activity (including entering any stadium) for four months and fined CHF100,000 (approx. £65,700/€82,000/US$119,000). In the round of 16, Uruguay played Colombia but were beaten 2–0, eliminating them from the tournament.

Uruguay bowed out early of the next two additions of the Copa América, losing in Quarter-finals in 2015 and not making it out of the Group stage in 2016. However, in the 2018 FIFA World Cup, La Celeste re-found their previous form. After beating Egypt 1-0, Saudi Arabia 1-0, and Russia 3-0, Uruguay topped Group A getting 9 points from a possible 9. In the Round of 16, they met Portugal who were led by reigning Ballon d'Or winner Cristiano Ronaldo. In an intense back-and-forth game, Uruguay ended up on top 2-1 after two stunning goals by Edinson Cavani. In the Quarter-finals they met France, the team who would go on to win the tournament. Uruguay lost the game 2-0 and this would be the last World Cup which featured key legends like Edinson Cavani, Luis Suárez, and Diego Godín as starters . The duo of Suárez and Cavani ended the 2018 World Cup with a combined 5 goals.

==== Chile (2007–2017) ====
The backbone of the Chile team which won back-to-back Copa América titles in 2015 and 2016 came from the U-20 squad that finished third at the 2007 FIFA U-20 World Cup in Canada, most notably Alexis Sánchez and Arturo Vidal. Other notable players during this period included Claudio Bravo, Eduardo Vargas, Mauricio Isla, Jean Beausejour, Gary Medel, Charles Aránguiz, Gonzalo Jara, Jorge Valdivia, Matías Fernández and Mark González. Under managers Marcelo Bielsa and later Jorge Sampaoli, Chile became renowned for its high-intensity pressing, attacking style of play and tactical flexibility, transforming the national team into one of South America's strongest sides.

Chile qualified for the 2010 FIFA World Cup, their first World Cup in 12 years, reaching the round of 16 before losing to Brazil. They followed this by reaching the round of 16 again at the 2014 FIFA World Cup, where they were narrowly eliminated by hosts Brazil on penalties after Mauricio Pinilla struck the crossbar in the final minute of extra time.

The generation reached its peak by winning Chile's first major international trophy at the 2015 Copa América, defeating Argentina on penalties in the final. They successfully defended the title the following year by again defeating Argentina in the final of the Copa América Centenario, becoming the first Chilean national team to win consecutive major international tournaments. Claudio Bravo won the Golden Glove at the 2015 tournament, while Eduardo Vargas finished as the top scorer in both the 2015 Copa América and the Copa América Centenario.

In 2017, Chile finished runners-up to Germany at the 2017 FIFA Confederations Cup, their best-ever finish in a FIFA competition. However, they subsequently failed to qualify for the 2018 FIFA World Cup, despite much of the squad remaining in the prime of their careers, following unexpected defeats to Bolivia and Paraguay during qualification.

During this period, Chile reached a highest-ever FIFA World Ranking of third in January 2016, the highest ranking in the nation's history.

==== Colombia (1987–1998, 2012–2018, 2022–present) ====
Colombian football witnessed a "Golden Generation" in the late 1980's by a synchronized brand of possession play known as toque-toque, which transformed the nation into a global powerhouse. Orchestrated by Carlos Valderrama and flanked by world-class talents like Freddy Rincón, Faustino Asprilla, goalkeeper René Higuita and defender Andrés Escobar, this squad burst onto the scene with a third-place finish at the 1987 Copa América and making it ot the Round of 16 in the 1990 FIFA World Cup. The pinnacle of their style came during the 1994 FIFA World Cup qualification, highlighted by a 5-0 defeat of Argentina in Buenos Aires that had Pelé tipping them to win the entire tournament. However, their on-pitch success was linked to Colombia's drug cartel era. The extreme pressure and cartel-driven death threats culminated in a first-round exit at the 1994 FIFA World Cup and the murder of Andrés Escobar just days after he scored an accidental own-goal. The generation continued to the 1998 FIFA World Cup. The early 2010's saw a renaissance of Colombian football. The team was considered the "Second Golden Generation" of Colombia, in reference to Colombia's Golden Generation from the 1980s and 1990s. Star players James Rodríguez, Juan Cuadrado and Radamel Falcao helped the team reach the 2014 FIFA World Cup knockout stage after topping a group featuring Greece, Ivory Coast and Japan, winning all three games. Colombia then beat Uruguay in the round of sixteen, before suffering a 1–2 defeat to host nation Brazil, in the quarter-finals. James Rodríguez was the tournament top goalscorer; and Colombia earned the FIFA Fair Play Award. At the Copa América Centenario, Colombia won third place after beating the United States 1–0. At the 2018 FIFA World Cup, Colombia were considered group favourites for Group H; featuring Japan, Poland and Senegal. Following a 1–2 defeat to Japan in which they went down to 10-men in under five minutes, Colombia beat Poland 3–0 and later beat Senegal 1–0 to qualify as group winners. They were knocked out by England in the round of sixteen; losing on penalties. Between June and August 2016, Colombia were ranked as 3rd in both FIFA and Elo ranking. Other key players from this generation include Carlos Sánchez, Fredy Guarín, Jackson Martínez, Cristián Zapata and Carlos Bacca.

Following their absence from the 2022 FIFA World Cup, the Colombia national football team had undergone a resurgence under manager Néstor Lorenzo, ushering in another "Golden Generation." Colombia has developed an aggressive style of play, leading to a multi-year unbeaten run and a showing at the 2024 Copa América Final. James Rodríguez has emerged as the squad's captain, flanked by winger Luis Díaz. The duo is supported by midfielder Richard Ríos, defender Jefferson Lerma and full-back Daniel Muñoz. They are further complemented by footballers including Jhon Arias and Luis Suarez.

=== North America ===
==== Canada (2021–present) ====
The Canadian national team’s emerging generation included Alphonso Davies, Jonathan David, Tajon Buchanan, Stephen Eustáquio, Ismaël Koné and Cyle Larin. Davies became the first Canadian men’s international to win the UEFA Champions League, while David became Canada’s leading men’s international goalscorer.

Canada ended 2021 40th in the FIFA World Rankings, its highest-ever position at the time, and earning the honour of "Most Improved Side" after having started the year 72nd. On 10 February 2022, Canada moved up to 33rd in the rankings.

On 27 March 2022, Canada finished top of the final qualification group in CONCACAF with the most goals scored and the fewest goals conceded, qualifying for its first World Cup in 36 years.

In 2024, Canada qualified for its first-ever Copa America. After finishing second in the group stages ahead of Peru and Chile, Canada won its quarter-final match against Venezuela on penalties. After losing to Argentina in the semi-finals, Canada faced Uruguay in the 3rd and 4th place match. Despite Canada leading the match, Uruguay managed to equalize in the 92nd minute and eventually won on penalties. Canada finished the 2024 Copa America in 4th place, the highest-placing CONCACAF team in the tournament.

In September of 2025, Canada reached 26th in the FIFA World Rankings, its highest-ever position.

During the 2026 FIFA World Cup, Canada drew 1–1 against Bosnia and Herzegovina in the opening group match, earning their first ever World Cup point. In the following match on June 18, Canada achieved their first ever World Cup victory and clean sheet following a 6–0 win over Qatar. In doing so, the team broke numerous World Cup records. Canada subsequently qualified to the knock-out rounds of the World Cup for the first time in its history. On June 28, 2026, Canada beat South Africa in the Round of 32, qualifying for the Round of 16. Canada eventually finished the tournament in 14th place, their best ever finish in a FIFA World Cup.

==== United States (2021–present) ====
After failing to qualify during the 2018 FIFA World Cup qualification with an aging Major League Soccer-based team, a large influx of young new American soccer talent arose during the COVID-19 pandemic playing for top European clubs led by former Chelsea player Christian Pulisic, whose transfer to the club made him the most expensive North American player of all time. Key players include Giovanni Reyna, Weston McKennie, Brenden Aaronson, Sergiño Dest, Yunus Musah, Timothy Weah, and Tyler Adams. The new young group has widely been described as America's golden generation.

This new group won the inaugural CONCACAF Nations League in 2021. The team set a U.S. men's program record for wins in a calendar year, with 17 wins, 2 losses, and 3 draws. The group was the youngest squad in the world to qualify in the 2022 FIFA World Cup qualification at an average age of 23.8 years old. During the 2022 FIFA World Cup, the USMNT had the second-youngest squad of the tournament at an average age of 25, with Tyler Adams being the youngest captain. In 2023 the team defended their Nations League title and won the 2022–23 CONCACAF Nations League, conceding 0 goals in the finals.

In 2024, the U.S. crashed out of the group stages of the 2024 Copa America, behind Uruguay and Panama. The result has led some commentators to question whether this group of players is, in fact, a golden generation. This increased when the team lost to Panama again in the 2025 CONCACAF Nations League Finals. However, under new manager Mauricio Pochettino at the 2026 FIFA World Cup the team achieved its highest scoring game in U.S. World Cup history and tied for the biggest win for the U.S. at a World Cup since 1930 with a 4-1 win over Paraguay in the group stage, then beating Australia 2-0 to become the first time the U.S. won multiple group stage games, also since 1930. The team beat Bosnia and Herzegovina in the round of 32; only the second time they've achieved a knockout stage win.

=== Oceania ===
==== Australia (2005–2015) ====
In 2005, Australia qualified for the 2006 FIFA World Cup, marking their first appearance at the tournament since 1974. Under experienced manager Guus Hiddink, the team sported talents such as Harry Kewell, Mark Viduka, Lucas Neill, and Tim Cahill. In Group F, the Socceroos finished second following a 3–1 victory over Japan before losing to Brazil 2–0 and drawing 2–2 with Croatia. Australia lost 1–0 to Italy in the ensuing Round of 16 match courtesy of a late Francesco Totti penalty. Lucas Neill observed if he did not concede a foul against Fabio Grosso, who won Italy's penalty, Australia would have "possibly gone on to the semi-finals of the World Cup" had they defeated Ukraine who would have played them in the quarter-finals. Former Socceroos coach Graham Arnold believed that the 2006 team was "a once in my lifetime generation", with Guus Hiddink remarking "they deserved to get into at least one more round". The team's performance at the 2006 tournament remains Australia's joint-best finish at the FIFA World Cup. Australia later joined the Asian Football Confederation for stronger competition and a more equitable path to qualifying for future FIFA World Cups. With Graham Arnold as a caretaker coach, the team went on to compete in the 2007 AFC Asian Cup, where unconvincing performances led to a disappointing quarter-final exit against Japan. That tournament was Mark Viduka's final outing for the national team.

Australia's 2006 FIFA World Cup lineup against Japan

In 2009, Football Australia established the National Football Curriculum with a focus on the Dutch style of play. The curriculum, combined with the significant goodwill Australia's football executives expressed from Dutchman Guus Hiddink's tactical nous, led to Pim Verbeek's appointment as Socceroos head coach. Australia would cruise through qualification for the 2010 FIFA World Cup, conceding just one goal in eight matches. Verbeek largely used the same group of players which featured in the 2006 FIFA World Cup and 2007 AFC Asian Cup campaigns. Verbeek criticised the quality of Australia's newly established A-League and was reluctant to select Australian-based players for the national team. Despite a 1–1 draw against Ghana and a 2–1 victory over Serbia, Australia failed to qualify for the knockout stage of the tournament due to poor goal difference from a heavy 4–0 loss against Germany. Verbeek left his post, with Holgier Osieck assuming the reins. Osieck led the team to the 2011 AFC Asian Cup final, losing 1–0 to Japan, before narrowly qualifying for the 2014 FIFA World Cup after a series of poor performances. Under Osieck, the team suffered successive 6–0 friendly match defeats to Brazil and France, with Football Australia dismissing him to appoint Ange Postecoglou. At this point, analysts were stating how the golden generation had stagnated, calling on a new group of players to feature for the Socceroos. Postecoglou took a relatively inexperienced Australian team to the 2014 FIFA World Cup. Mark Schwarzer, Lucas Neill, Harry Kewell and Brett Emerton, who all featured in the qualification campaign leading up to the tournament, had recently retired or were not selected for the final squad.

Many pundits attribute the team's success to the poor quality of the domestic National Soccer League (NSL), which forced players to move to European leagues to develop further. Following the Australian Government's 2003 Crawford Report, the NSL was dissolved in favour of the A-League. Mark Schwarzer disagreed with the establishment of a new league, arguing that players would become comfortable with remaining in Australia instead of challenging themselves in Europe. Mark Viduka suggested that Football Australia did not focus on creating strong player academies and youth development sides attached to the A-League. Viduka rued the demise of the Australian Institute of Sport's football program, which other golden generation players Vince Grella, Mark Bresciano, Josh Kennedy and Brett Emerton attended. Critics have also argued that the National Football Curriculum has failed to develop the same calibre of players as Australia's golden generation.

=== Club football ===
==== Manchester United – Class of 92 ====
Defined by a group of six players who came through the Manchester United academy and won the FA Youth Cup together in 1992, the Class of 92 was a golden generation that won the Premier league six times during the 1990s and the Champions League in 1998–99. The 6 players that defined the generation were David Beckham, Nicky Butt, Ryan Giggs, Gary Neville, Phil Neville and Paul Scholes.

== Ice hockey ==
=== Sweden (1996–2006) ===
Born in the early 1970s, the Swedish national ice hockey team had a generation of players that achieved success in the NHL and eventually won gold at the 2006 Winter Olympics, beating Finland with 3–2 in the gold medal game. Future members of Hockey Hall of Fame Nicklas Lidström, Peter Forsberg, Mats Sundin and Daniel Alfredsson, along with Markus Näslund are famous players from this generation.

=== Canada (2005–2016) ===
Featuring players born in the mid-1980s, the Canadian national men's hockey team has had a golden generation which contributed to five consecutive IIHF World U20 Championships between 2005 and 2009, and subsequently won back-to-back gold medals at the 2010 and 2014 Winter Olympics, and gold at the 2016 World Cup of Hockey. Twelve players have also won the Stanley Cup and six are members of the Triple Gold Club.

=== Finland (2014–present) ===
Composed of players born in the mid- to late 1990s, the Finland men's national ice hockey team has had a golden generation of young stars. Finland won the IIHF World U20 Championships in 2014, 2016 and 2019 and the country's first-ever Olympic ice hockey gold medal in 2022. In the 2016 NHL Draft, three of the top five picks were from Finland. Notable players from this generation include Aleksander Barkov, Sebastian Aho, Miro Heiskanen, Juuse Saros, Patrik Laine, Kaapo Kakko and Mikko Rantanen.

=== United States (2014–present) ===
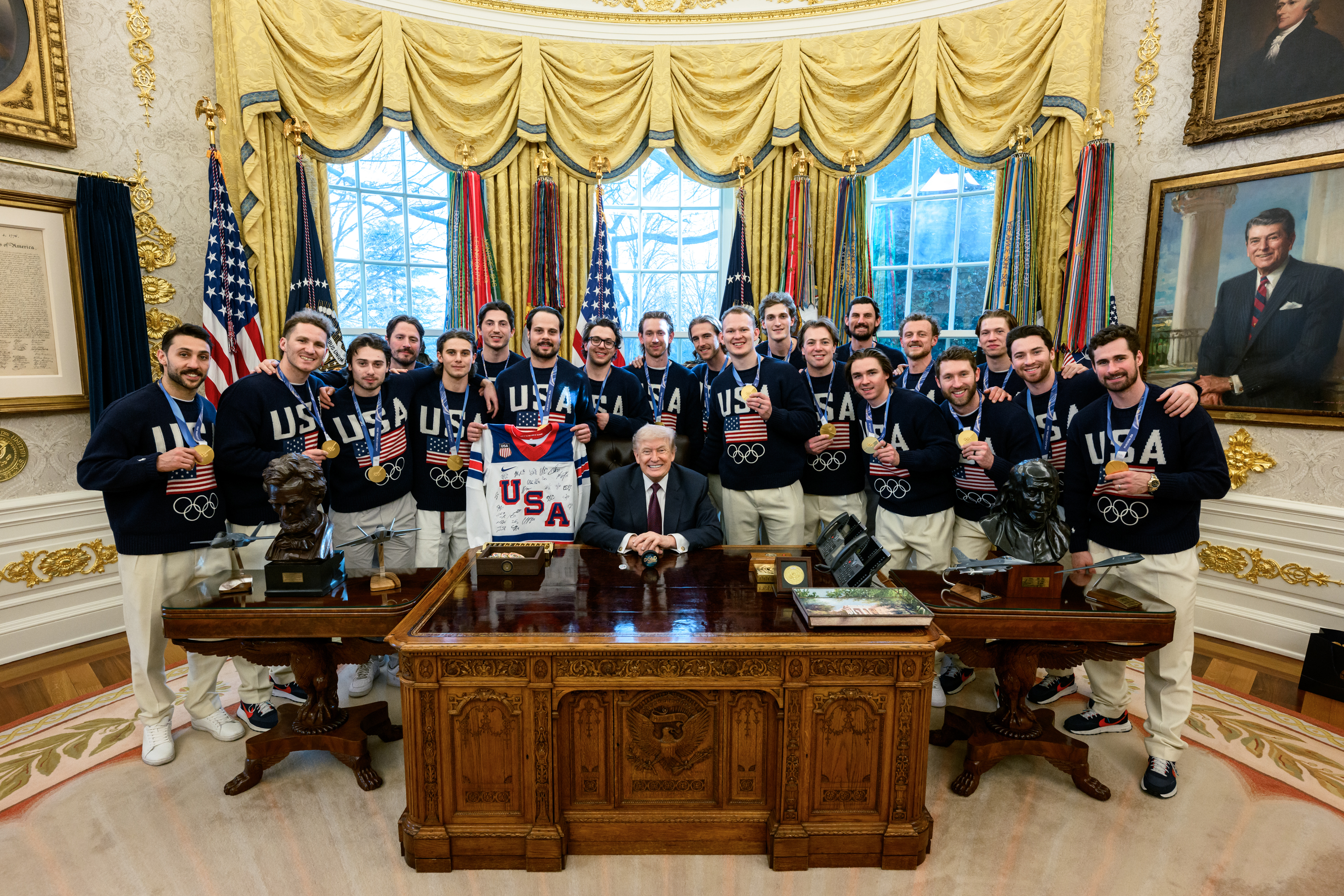
The 2026 U.S. Olympic men's hockey team visiting President Donald Trump in the Oval Office following their gold medal win

Born in the late 1990s and early 2000s, the United States men's national ice hockey team has had a golden generation of players, largely attributed to the founding of the USA Hockey National Team Development Program in 2014. This includes first overall picks Auston Matthews and Jack Hughes, who were both members of the program. The generation of American players saw great individual success in the National Hockey League, with Matthews and Connor Hellebuyck winning the Hart Trophy, Adam Fox, Quinn Hughes and Zach Werenski winning the Norris Trophy and Hellebuyck winning three Vezina Trophies. Other notable members of this generation include brothers Brady and Matthew Tkachuk, Jack Eichel, Jason Robertson, Clayton Keller, Kyle Connor, Dylan Larkin and Tage Thompson. As a team, the United States won four IIHF World U20 Championships in 2017, 2021, 2024 and 2025, their first Ice Hockey World Championship since 1933 in 2025 and first Olympic gold medal since the Miracle on Ice in 2026.

== Handball ==
=== Sweden 1990s and early 2000s – The Bengan boys ===
Named after the nickname of their coach Bengt "Bengan" Johansson, the Swedish team won the 1994, 1998, 2000 and 2002 European Championships and the 1990 and 1999 World Championships. They had many of the best players in the world, including the 1990 World Player of the year, Magnus Wislander, Staffan Olsson, Stefan Lövgren, Ola Lindgren, Magnus Andersson, Tomas Svensson, Erik Hajas, Per Carlén and Ljubomir Vranjes.

=== Denmark 1990s and early 2000s – The Iron Ladies ===
The 1990s Denmark team, nicknamed the iron ladies or De Jernhårde Ladies in Danish won three straight Olympics Gold medals in 1996, 2000 and 2004 and the 1997 World Championship. The team features some of the best handball players ever, including among others Anja Andersen, Lene Rantala and Camilla Andersen. The generation started with the hiring of Ulrik Wilbek as the head coach in 1991 and the silver medals at the 1993 World Championship. The team sparked a cultural change in Denmark, where women's handball were considered unserious and amateurish to being an important part of Danish culture.

=== Croatia (1994–1996, 2003–2010) ===
Croatia's first golden generation in handball emerged in the 1990s following Croatia's independence from Yugoslavia in 1991, highlighted by their bronze medal at the 1994 European Championship and silver medal at the 1995 World Championship. Their crowning achievement was the gold medal at the 1996 Olympics in Atlanta. This period was defined by a core group of players, including many who had previously played for the Yugoslavian national team, and was cemented by coaches Zdravko Zovko and Velimir Kljaić and key players like Slavko Goluža, Zlatko Saračević, Patrik Ćavar, Alvaro Načinović and Goran Perkovac.

Croatia's second golden generation in handball emerged in the early 2000's following Croatia's seven-year massive decline after winning the gold medal at the 1996 Olympics in Atlanta, the team was taken over by a known Croatian coach Lino Červar after their worst ever performance at the international scene in 2002 and in the span of 18 months they went from being the worst ranked team at the 2002 European Championship to being World Champions (2003) and Olympic Winners (2004). They finished fourth at the European Championship in 2004 and 2006 and the 2008 Olympics in Peking. The weakest result of this era was fifth ranked place at the 2007 World Championship in Germany. Combined with two gold medals, under Lino Červar they played four more finals (2005, 2008, 2009, 2010) losing all four to Spain, Denmark and their biggest ever rivals France twice. Lino Červar stepped down as the coach following third consecutive loss at the 2010 European Championship final, he was replaced by his assistant coach and former Croatian captain Slavko Goluža. The era is defined by legendary players like Ivano Balić, one of the world's best players, and features a squad that included many prominent athletes such as Slavko Goluža, Igor Vori, Blaženko Lacković, Denis Špoljarić, Mirza Džomba, Goran Šprem, Petar Metličić and Vlado Šola. In the later years following retirements of many experienced and older players, younger players started to arrive on the scene who had a big impact in upcoming years such as Domagoj Duvnjak, who'd later become one of the world's best players, Ivan Čupić, Zlatko Horvat, Marko Kopljar, Manuel Štrlek and Mirko Alilović.

== Rugby union ==
=== France (2020–present) ===
Following the appointment of Fabien Galthié as head coach of the national team, France has seen an influx of talent dubbed a "golden generation." Largely attributed to the establishment of the JIFF (joueurs issus des filières de formation, loosely translated as "academy-trained players") rules, the generation first emerged after winning three straight World Rugby Under 20 Championships in 2018, 2019 and 2023, before seeing success at the senior level with a Grand Slam in 2022 and back-to-back Six Nations Championships in 2025 and 2026. At club level, French sides have won six straight Champions Cups from 2020 to 2026 and all but two Challenge Cups in the same period. The side is captained by Antoine Dupont, who won the Men's 15s Player of the Year in 2021 and is widely regarded as one of the best players of all time, and perhaps the greatest No. 9 to play in the modern era. In the Six Nations, Louis Bielle-Biarrey set a new record for most tries scored by one player in a single tournament with eight in 2025, before breaking his own record the following year with nine. Other key players that have emerged include Mickaël Guillard, Thomas Ramos, Grégory Alldritt, Damian Penaud, Jean-Baptiste Gros, Thibaud Flament, Cameron Woki, Romain Ntamack and Yoram Moefana.

== See also ==
- Dynasty (sports)
- Golden age (metaphor)
