= Stig Sundqvist =

Swedish footballer and manager

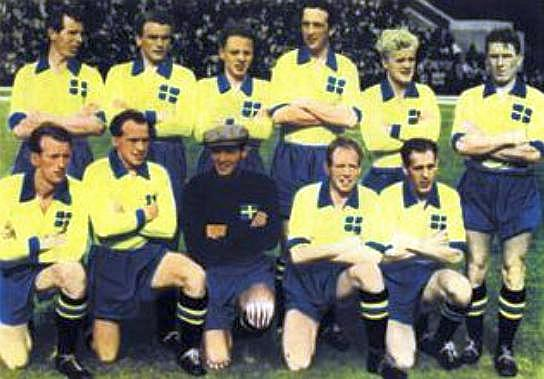

Personal information
- Date of birth: 19 July 1922
- Place of birth: Boden, Sweden
- Date of death: 3 August 2011 (aged 89)
- Place of death: Jönköping, Sweden
- Positions: Striker; midfielder

Senior career*
Years	Team	Apps	(Gls)
–1949	Vittjärvs IK		
1949–1950	IFK Norrköping		
1950–1953	Roma	78	(20)

International career
1949–1950	Sweden	11	(3)

Managerial career
- 1955–1958: GIF Sundsvall
- Jönköpings Södra IF
Medal record
Representing Sweden
FIFA World Cup
Third place	1950 Brazil
- * Club domestic league appearances and goals

Stig "Vittjärv" Sundqvist (19 July 1922 – 3 August 2011) was a Swedish professional footballer who played as a forward or midfielder.

== Career ==
Sundqvist played 11 games for the Sweden national team and scored 3 goals at the 1950 FIFA World Cup, helping Sweden to a third-place finish and their first ever World Cup medal. After the World Cup he left Swedish side IFK Norrköping for the Italian club A.S. Roma, where he remained until 1953. Upon returning to Sweden he was active in coaching, among other teams Jönköpings Södra IF, for several years. Sundqvist is considered the best footballer of all time from Norrbotten along with Tommy Holmgren.

== Personal life ==
During his active days he was known by the nickname "Vittjärv", after the Swedish village where he grew up. Sundqvist got the nickname "Pagnottella" in Italy since his surname sounded like sandwich.

== Career statistics ==
=== International ===
Appearances and goals by national team and year
National team	Year	Apps	Goals
Sweden	1949	5	0
Sweden	1950	6	3
Total		11	3

Scores and results list Sweden's goal tally first, score column indicates score after each Sundqvist goal.

List of international goals scored by Stig Sundqvist
No.	Date	Venue	Opponent	Score	Result	Competition	Ref.
1	29 June 1950	Estadio Durival de Brito, Curitiba, Paraná, Brazil	Paraguay	1–0	2–0	1950 FIFA World Cup	
2	13 July 1950	Pacaembu Stadium, São Paulo, Brazil	Uruguay	2–1	2–3	1950 FIFA World Cup	
3	16 July 1950	Pacaembu Stadium, São Paulo, Brazil	Spain	1–0	3–1	1950 FIFA World Cup	

== Honours ==
Sweden

- FIFA World Cup third place: 1950
