= Gullträsk =

- Hamlet
- Coordinates: 66°11′42″N 21°11′24″E
- Country: Sweden
- County: Norrbotten
- Municipality: Boden

Gullträsk is a hamlet located in Boden Municipality.
