= Forest School Complex in Biłgoraj =

- Zespół Szkół Leśnych w Biłgoraju
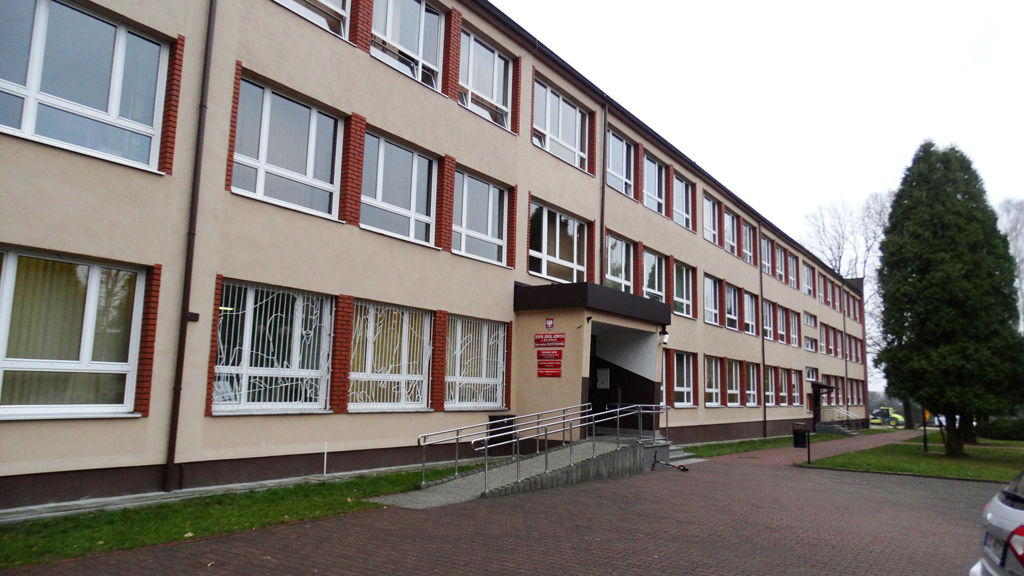

General information
- Type: Technikum (Polish education)
- Address: Polna 3 Street, Biłgoraj, Poland
- Coordinates: 50°31′55.249″N 22°42′6.967″E
- Named for: Polskie Towarzystwo Leśne
- Completed: 1964

Website
- www.zslbilgoraj.pl

Forest School Complex in Biłgoraj (pl. Zespół Szkół Leśnych w Biłgoraju) is an educational institution in Biłgoraj, Poland, which brings together professional technical school and first-level vocational forestry school with an educational profile focused on forest management. It is one of the 11 forest schools in Poland.

== Organizational information ==
The complex includes (2019) two schools:

- Forest Technical Secondary School,
- First Level Vocational Forestry School.

The Forest School Complex in Biłgoraj, due to the specialized nature of education, is not, unlike other secondary schools, under the jurisdiction of the district government. The school is supervised directly by the Minister of Climate and Environment. Students are obliged to wear forest service uniforms during classes.

== History of the school ==
The establishment of a forestry school in Biłgoraj was due to the proximity of the Solska Forest. The purpose of establishing the facility was to prepare a place whose graduates would be prepared to work in various branches of forest management.

On 1 September 1964, a branch class of the Forestry Technical Secondary School in Krasiczyn, based in Biłgoraj, was established. From the 1964/1965 school year, the branch operated using the facilities of other school institutions in the city. In the second half of the 1960s, teaching facilities were built and the school still uses them. On 3 January 1970, by decision of the ministerial authorities, the Forest Technical School in Biłgoraj gained organizational independence. The name – Forest School Complex in Biłgoraj – has been in force since January 1987.

== Educational base ==
The Forest School Complex in Biłgoraj has a main school building where classes are conducted. In addition, the unit includes a dormitory with space for 320 students, sports facilities and an experimental forest. The facility cooperates with, among others: with the State Forests, the Biłgoraj Forest District and hunting clubs, is equipped with specialized equipment used in various branches of forest management.

All facilities of the Forest School Complex are located at Polna Street, in the Rożnówka housing estate.

== Achievements ==
In 2011, the Student Sports Club at the Forest School Complex in Biłgoraj became the vice-champion of the Polish Amateur PlusLiga in volleyball.

In 2017 and 2023, the school won first place in the Polish Forest Schools Championship of the Minister of Climate and Environment in volleyball.

In 2019, at the 11th Polish School Championships in Forest Skills under the patronage of the Ministry of Climate and Environment and the General Directorate of State Forests, the school's representation took first place in the overall team classification. The school also took part in the 18th European Students Championship in Forestry Skills.
