= Sävast =

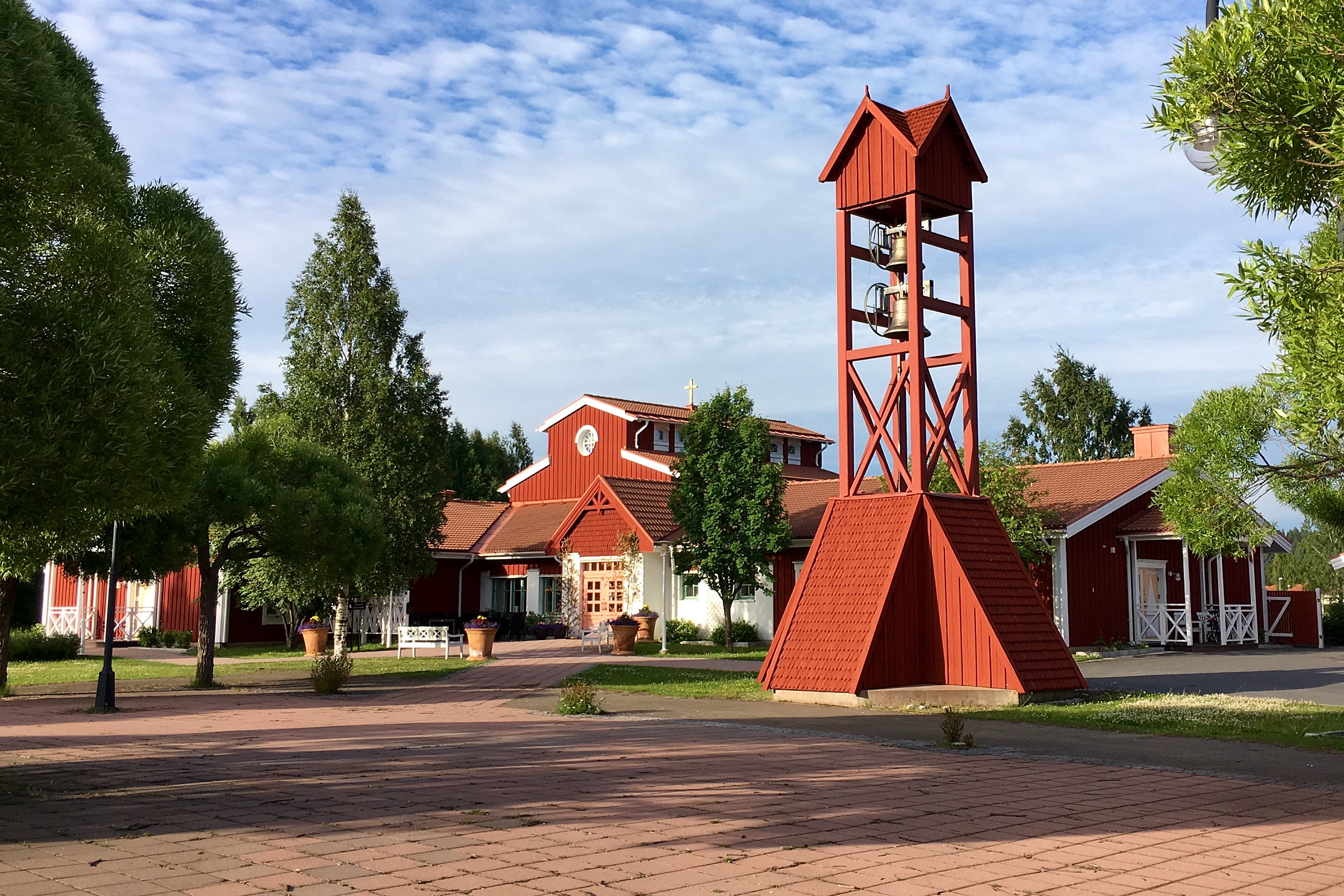

- Location within Norrbotten Location within Sweden
- Coordinates: 65°46′N 21°44′E
- Country: Sweden
- Province: Norrbotten
- County: Norrbotten County
- Municipality: Boden Municipality

Area
  - Total: 3.59 km^{2} (1.39 sq mi)

Population (31 December 2010)
  - Total: 3,148
  - Density: 877/km^{2} (2,270/sq mi)
- Time zone: UTC+1 (CET)
  - Summer (DST): UTC+2 (CEST)

Sävast (Swedish pronunciation: [ˈsɛ̂ːvast]) is a village located in Boden Municipality, Norrbotten County, Sweden. It had a population of 3,148 in 2010.
