= Skogså IF =

Swedish football club

- Full name: Skogså Idrottsförening
- Founded: 1942
- Ground: Boden Arena; Boden; Sweden
- Chairman: Eva Bergström
- League: Division 4 Norrbotten Norra
Home colours	Away colours

Skogså IF is a Swedish football club located in the Boden municipality.

== Background ==
Skogså IF currently plays in Division 4 Norrbotten Norra which is the sixth tier of Swedish football. They play their home matches at the Boden Arena in Boden and Åvallen in Skogså during summertime.

The club is affiliated to Norrbottens Fotbollförbund.

== Season to season ==
Season	Level	Division	Section	Position	Movements
1999	Tier 6	Division 5	Norrbotten Östra	3rd	
2000	Tier 6	Division 5	Norrbotten Mellersta	3rd	
2001	Tier 6	Division 5	Norrbotten Mellersta	7th	
2002	Tier 6	Division 5	Norrbotten Mellersta	2nd	Promoted
2003	Tier 5	Division 4	Norrbotten Norra	8th	
2004	Tier 5	Division 4	Norrbotten Norra	5th	
2005	Tier 5	Division 4	Norrbotten Norra	6th	
2006*	Tier 6	Division 4	Norrbotten Norra	5th	
2007	Tier 6	Division 4	Norrbotten Norra	7th	
2008	Tier 6	Division 4	Norrbotten Norra	3rd	
2009	Tier 6	Division 4	Norrbotten Norra	4th	
2010	Tier 6	Division 4	Norrbotten Norra	5th	
2011	Tier 6	Division 4	Norrbotten Norra	3rd	

* League restructuring in 2006 resulted in a new division being created at Tier 3 and subsequent divisions dropping a level.
