= Tejbz =

Swedish video game commentator

- Born: Tobias Öjerfalk; 5 May 1988 (age 38); Boden, Sweden
- Occupation: Online streamer

YouTube information
- Channel: Tejbz
- Years active: 2010–present
- Genre: Video games
- Subscribers: 536 thousand
- Views: 113 million
- Last updated: October 21, 2025
- Website: tejbz.com

Tobias Öjerfalk (born 5 May 1988) is a Swedish video game commentator on Twitch and YouTube, better known by his screen name as Tejbz.

== Background ==
Öjerfalk was born and grew up in Boden, Sweden. He was diagnosed with Crohn's disease at a young age, meaning he could not be as physically active as others, leading him to pick up computer games to fill and enjoy time around the age of 10. His first video game console was the Nintendo 64.

He attended the Luleå University of Technology from 2008 to 2011 and graduated with a bachelor's degree in digital communications and media.

== Social media ==
As of May 2020, Tejbz had over 536,000 subscribers for his YouTube account and over 112,000,000 views on his videos since 2008.

Since May 2016, Tejbz is part of the TV4 talent network ENT, after they recruited him to end his collaboration with SPlay.

In August 2016, Tejbz participated in the web reality series Sommaren med YouTube-stjärnorna produced by MTG. It was broadcast by Viafree.
