= Boden, Sweden =

Boden
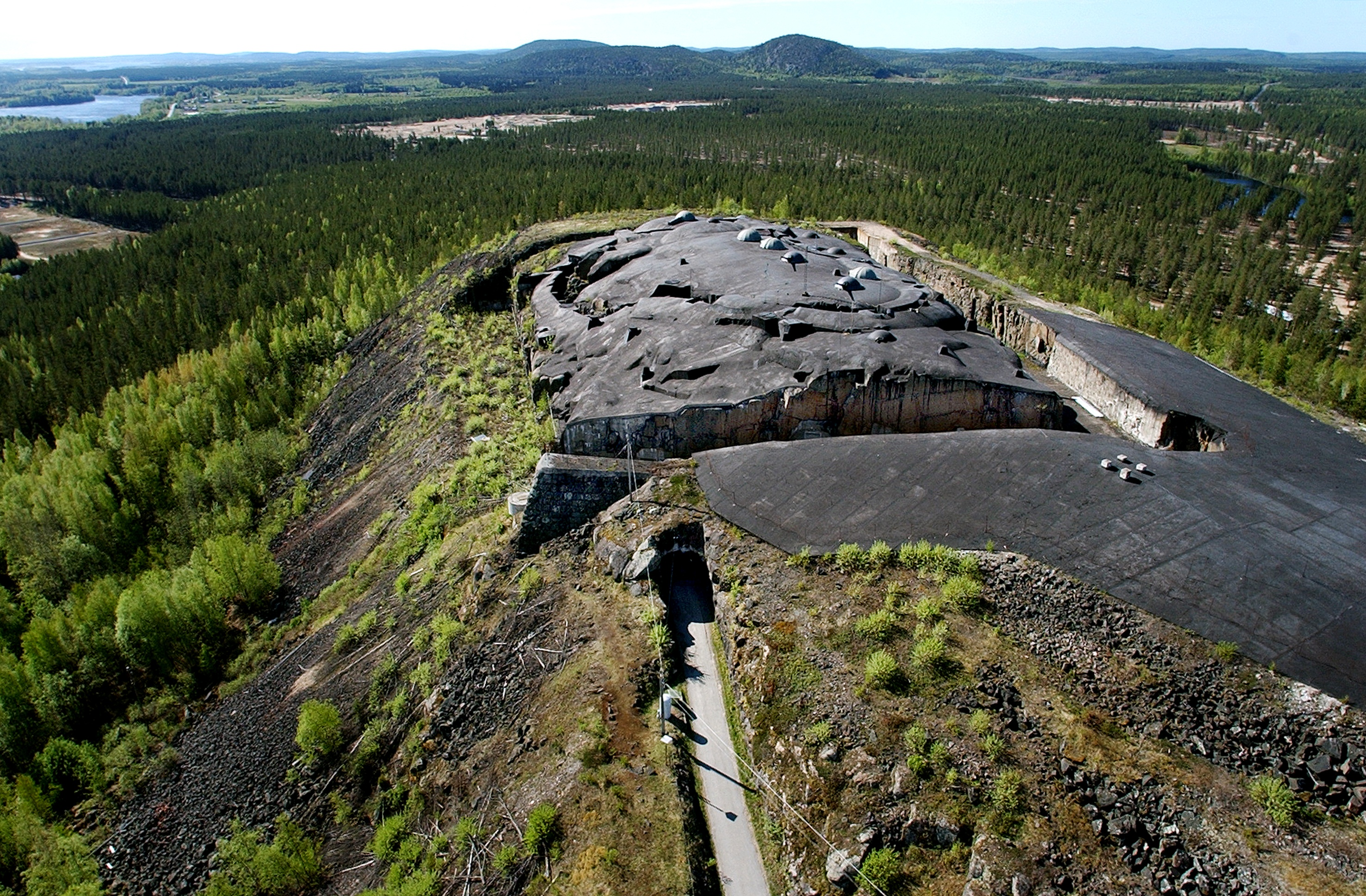
- Rödberget Fort, part of Boden Fortress

- Flag

- Location within Norrbotten Location within Sweden
- Coordinates: 65°49′32″N 21°41′26″E
- Country: Sweden
- Province: Norrbotten
- County: Norrbotten County
- Municipality: Boden Municipality
- Charter: 1919

Area
  - Total: 14.17 km^{2} (5.47 sq mi)
- Elevation: 46 m (151 ft)

Population (31 December 2018)
  - Total: 16,847
  - Density: 1,189/km^{2} (3,080/sq mi)
- Time zone: UTC+1 (CET)
  - Summer (DST): UTC+2 (CEST)
- Postal code: 961 xx
- Area code: (+46) 921
- Website: boden.se

Boden (Swedish: [ˈbǔːdɛn], outdatedly [ˈbûːdɛn], Lule Sámi: Suttes; Meänkieli: Puuti) is a locality and the seat of Boden Municipality in Norrbotten County, Sweden, with 16,847 inhabitants in 2018. It is part of the larger area around coastal city Luleå some 36 kilometres (22 mi) southeast. After Kiruna, it is the second largest town in Northern Sweden's interior.

== History ==
The town of Boden started as a railway junction where the Northern Line (Norra stambanan, opened 1894) met with the Ore Line (Malmbanan) from the rich iron ore fields in northern Sweden.

The town experienced increased growth when the Boden Fortress was constructed in the beginning of the 20th century. The purpose of the fortress was to defend Sweden from a possible attack from the east, where Russia was considered the most dangerous threat.

The first official writings mentioning Boden refer to it as "Boden Village" (Swedish: Bodebyn) and come from a 1539 national tax register. In 1546, "Boden village" is mentioned as having 7 homes. Boden received the title of city in 1919. This title became obsolete in 1971 and Boden is now the seat of Boden Municipality.

== Industry ==
Today (2007) Boden is still a military stronghold, and houses the largest garrison of the Swedish Army.

The army and the municipality are the two largest employers in Boden. As the military is continuously disarming, with the five regiments united into one garrison, the population has decreased by 2,000 people over the past ten years.

In 2022, the Swedish company Stegra began construction of a new steel mill in Boden, expected to start production in mid 2026. It will use hydrogen technology, designed to cut emissions by as much as 95%. If it succeeds, it will be the first large-scale green steel plant in Europe. The project received 314 M€ in funding from the European Investment Bank in 2024. The project includes a 700 MW electrolysis plant. In November 2024, Stegra signed a 6 TWh power purchase agreement with Uniper for the 2027-2032 period.

The famous Fällkniven knives are from Boden.

== Well-known Boden citizens, former or current ==
- Peter Englund, author, historian, Permanent secretary of the Swedish Academy (2009-2015)
- Karl Fabricius, ice hockey player
- Stefan Gunnarsson, singer, piano player
- Eyvind Johnson, author, Nobel Prize winner in literature 1974
- Lennart Klockare, politician
- Daniel Larsson, ice hockey player
- Johanna Larsson, tennis player
- Elias Lindholm, ice hockey player
- Jonna Löfgren, drummer with Glasvegas
- Stig Strömholm, professor, rector magnificus
- Oskar Sundqvist, ice hockey player
- Stig Sundqvist, football player
- Stig Synnergren, former Swedish Supreme Commander
- Sven Utterström, skier
- Niclas Wallin, ice hockey player
- Hans Wallmark, politician
- Brolle, singer
- Tommy Johansson, singer, guitarist of the bands Majestica (formerly ReinXeed) and Sabaton
- Tejbz, video game commentator and streamer
- Jessica Bäckman, racing driver

== International relations ==
=== Twin towns and sister cities ===
Boden is twinned with:

- Alta, Norway
- Hakkari, Turkey

== Sports ==
The following sports clubs are located in Boden:

- Bodens BK
- Hedens IF
- Skogså IF
- Vittjärvs IK
- Boden Hockey
- Boden Handboll IF
