= Berit Granquist =

Swedish fencer

Personal information
- Born: 21 May 1909 Boden Municipality, Sweden
- Died: 12 December 2001 (aged 92) Stockholm, Sweden

Sport
- Sport: Fencing

Berit Granquist (21 May 1909 – 12 December 2001) was a Swedish fencer. She competed in the women's individual foil event during the 1936 Summer Olympics.
