= Unbyn =

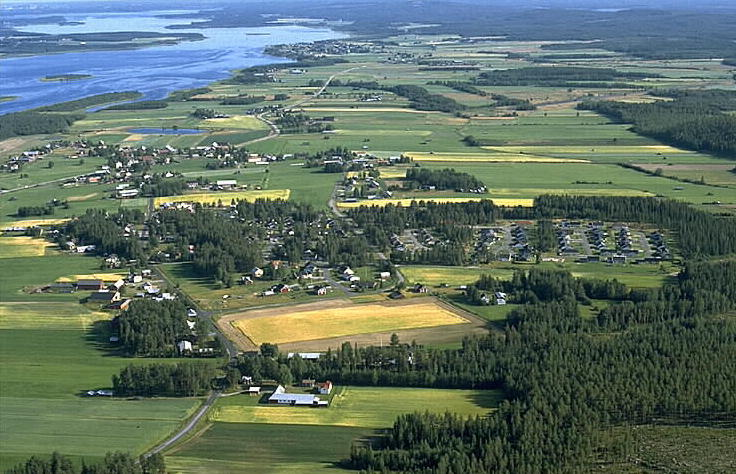

- Location within Norrbotten Location within Sweden
- Coordinates: 65°43′N 21°45′E
- Country: Sweden
- Province: Norrbotten
- County: Norrbotten County
- Municipality: Boden Municipality

Area
  - Total: 0.75 km^{2} (0.29 sq mi)

Population (31 December 2010)
  - Total: 468
  - Density: 622/km^{2} (1,610/sq mi)
- Time zone: UTC+1 (CET)
  - Summer (DST): UTC+2 (CEST)

Unbyn is a locality situated in Boden Municipality, Norrbotten County, Sweden with 468 inhabitants in 2010.
