= Vittjärv =

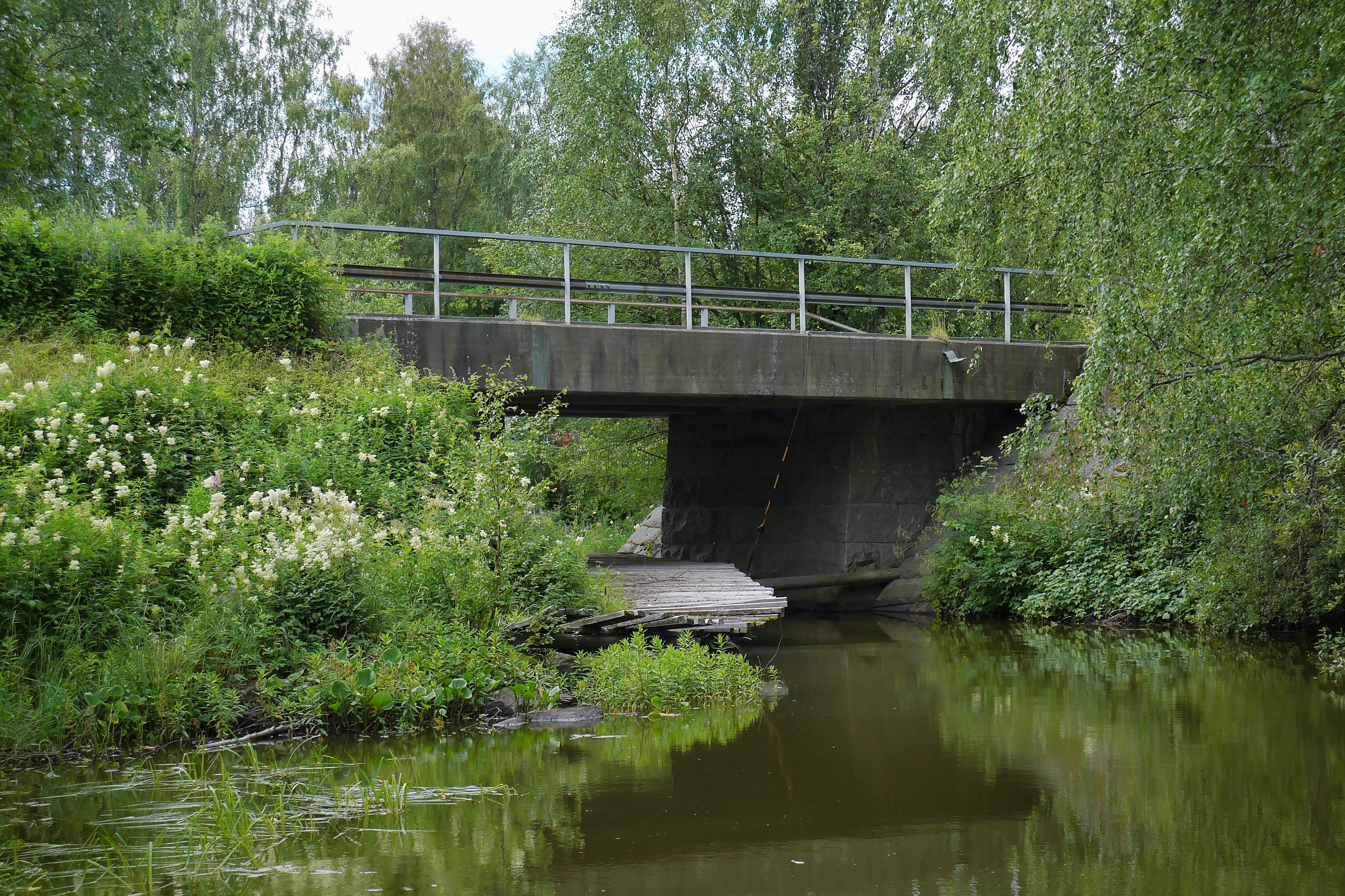

- Location within Norrbotten Location within Sweden
- Coordinates: 65°51′N 21°34′E
- Country: Sweden
- Province: Norrbotten
- County: Norrbotten County
- Municipality: Boden Municipality

Area
  - Total: 0.71 km^{2} (0.27 sq mi)

Population (31 December 2010)
  - Total: 445
  - Density: 630/km^{2} (1,600/sq mi)
- Time zone: UTC+1 (CET)
  - Summer (DST): UTC+2 (CEST)

Vittjärv is a locality situated in Boden Municipality, Norrbotten County, Sweden with 445 inhabitants in 2010. Vittjärv is home to sports club Vittjärvs IK, active in orienteering and football.
