= English Canal =

Irrelevant canal

The English Canal (Swedish: Engelska kanalen) was a planned and partially completed canal project that would connect the Swedish iron ore fields around Kiruna and Gällivare with Luleå and the Gulf of Bothnia.

The ore fields were discovered as early as in the 1650s, but due to their remote location in the sparsely populated areas in northern Sweden, far from both the Atlantic coast and the coast of the Bothnian Gulf, it was very hard to transport the ore to any port from where it could be shipped to its ultimate destination. All attempts during the centuries to efficiently transport the ore failed. But with the introduction of the railway, new possibilities arose.

Some earlier plans included horse-drawn trains and regular roads, but in the end it was decided to combine the new railway technology with the ancient boat transport. A railway line was planned for the stretch from the iron ore fields to the place where Stora Lule River and Lilla Lule River joined at Storbacken. The remaining length of the transport could be made possible by canalising the rest of Lule River from Storbacken down to Luleå. This would bypass the rapids of Edefors and Hedenforsarna which would allow the ore to be transported by boat all the way to the Gulf of Bothnia.

The decision to construct the canal was taken 1863, and the Gellivare Company Limited based in London was contracted for the project. They were backed by English financiers and also received investments from the Swedish state. The excavation was started 14 October 1864 and by 1865 no less than 1,486 men were working on the project. But the English company soon experienced an economic crisis, which led to the stagnation of the construction in 1866 and 1867, until the company went bankrupt on New Year's Eve 1867 which marked the end of the project.

In 1884-1888 a railway was built all the way between Gällivare and Luleå, the Iron Ore Line.

Remains of the canal project can still be seen on several places in Norrbotten and Swedish Lapland, for example in Boden. These remains are sometimes called Engelska graven, which is a play on the Swedish word grav which can mean both "ditch"/"trench" and "grave/"tomb".

== See also ==
- LKAB
- Iron Ore Line
- English Channel
