= Stefan Gunnarsson =

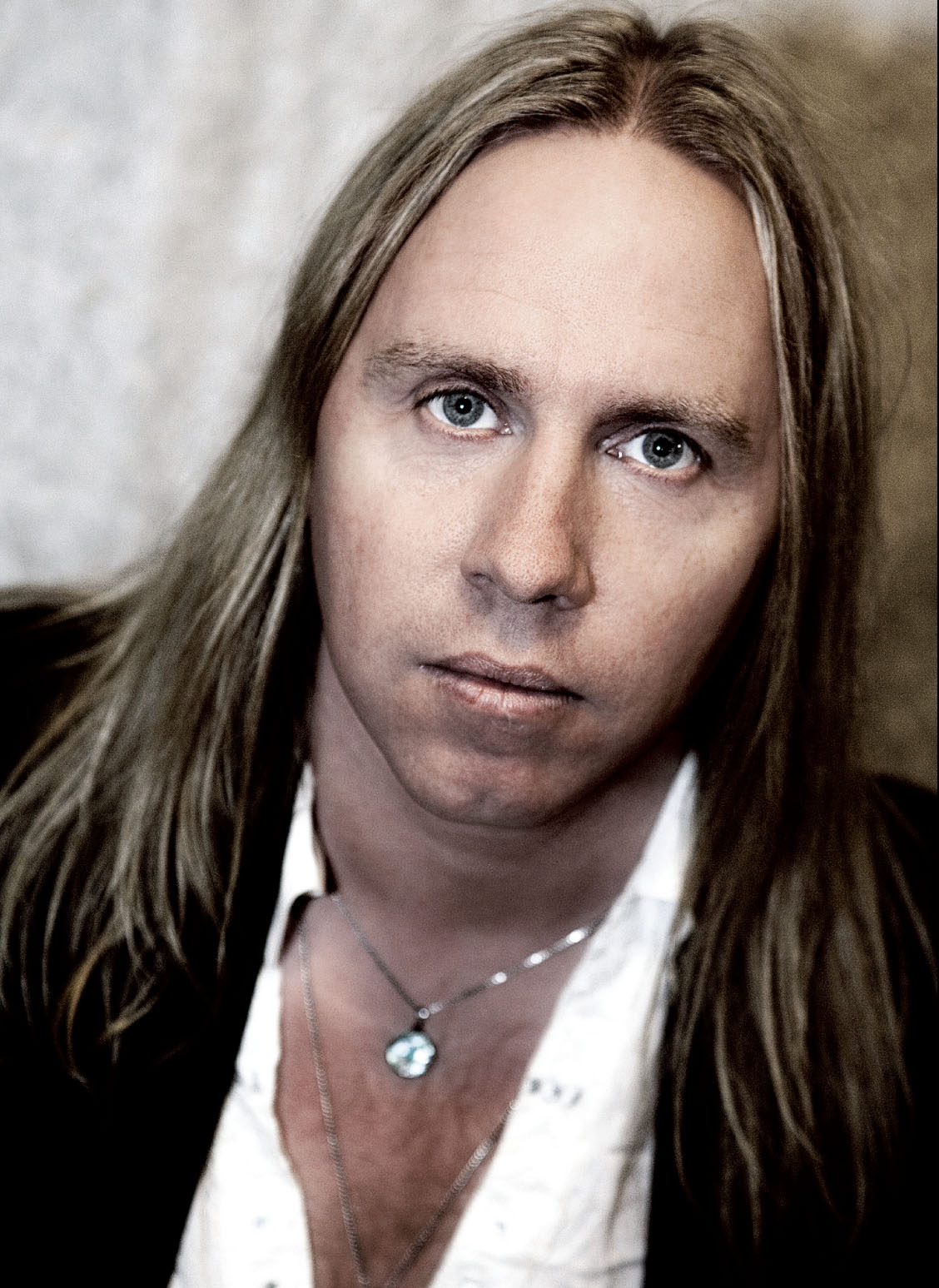
Stefan Gunnarsson

Stefan Gunnarsson, born October 24, 1968, in Boden, Sweden, is a Swedish musician, known as team captain in the Swedish TV program Så ska det låta.

Gunnarsson is a multi-instrumentalist. He started as a drummer but also sought out guitar, bass, piano, trumpet and harmonica, and sings also. He has appeared on albums by, among others, Janne Schaffer, Raj Montana Band, Sandra Cross and David Carlson.

Gunnarsson is a member of bands Enorma Groove and BLISS (a KISS-tribute band).
