= Boden Municipality =

Boden Municipality Bodens kommun
- Municipality
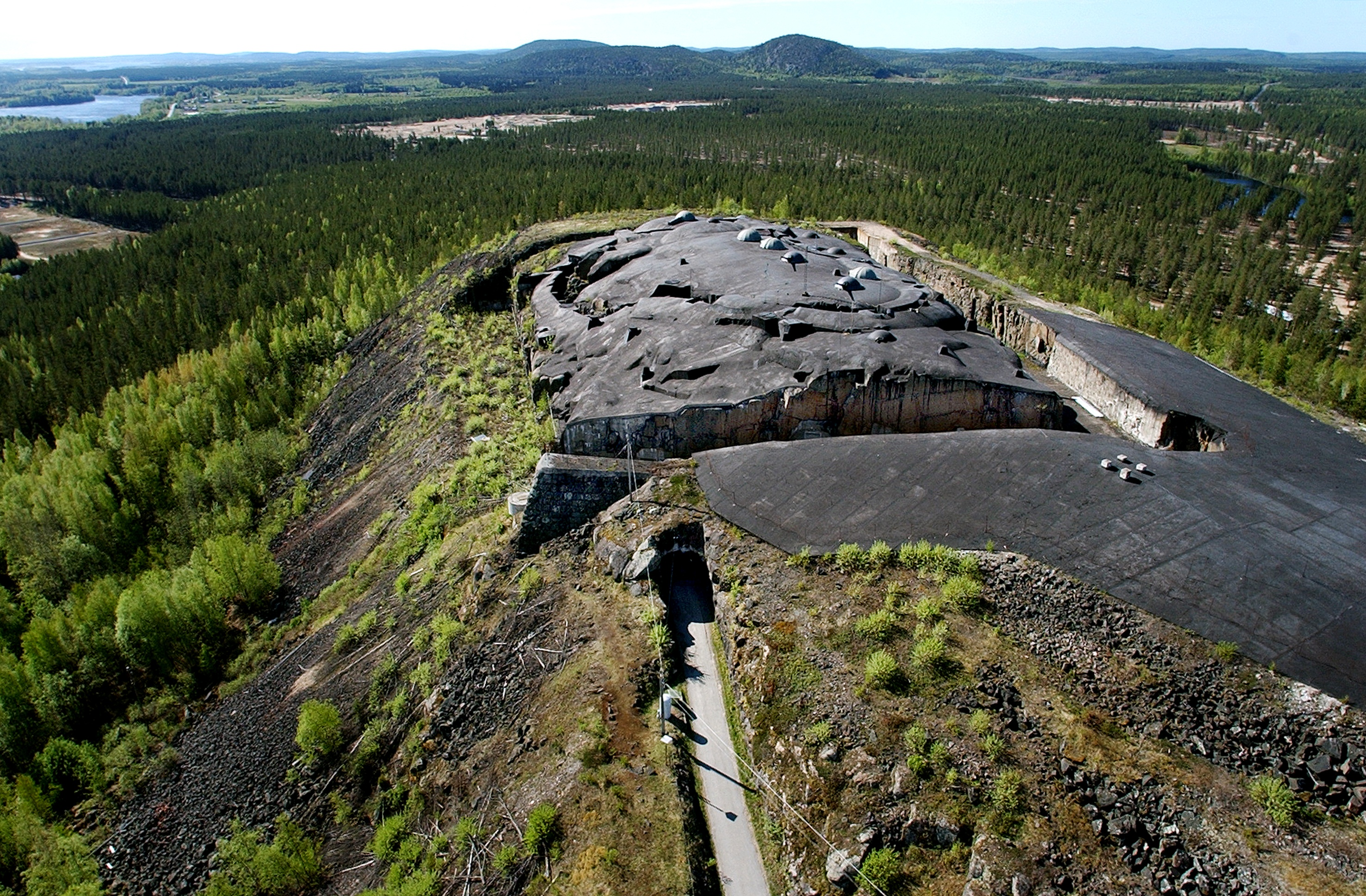
- Rödberget fort, part of Boden Fortress

- Flag Coat of arms

- Coordinates: 65°50′N 21°43′E
- Country: Sweden
- County: Norrbotten County
- Seat: Boden

Area
  - Total: 4,285.13 km^{2} (1,654.50 sq mi)
  - Land: 4,007.86 km^{2} (1,547.44 sq mi)
  - Water: 277.27 km^{2} (107.05 sq mi)
- Area as of 1 January 2014.

Population (30 June 2025)
  - Total: 28,172
  - Density: 7.0292/km^{2} (18.206/sq mi)
- Time zone: UTC+1 (CET)
  - Summer (DST): UTC+2 (CEST)
- ISO 3166 code: SE
- Province: Norrbotten
- Municipal code: 2582
- Website: www.boden.se

Boden Municipality (Swedish: Bodens kommun) is a municipality in Norrbotten County in northern Sweden. Its seat is located in Boden.

In 1919 the evolving garrison town of Boden was detached from Överluleå and instituted as a city municipality of its own. In 1967 the rest of Överluleå was merged into the city together with a part of Råneå. In 1971 Edefors (which in 1892 also had been detached from Överluleå) was added and the present municipality was formed.

== History ==
According to recent finds, the oldest human settlements are believed to be from around 5,000 BC. From this early time nothing is known (except some scarce finds). First accounted-for sources are from the 16th century, when Boden is referred to as Bodebyn or Bodarna, which may refer to the sheds (bod means "shed"). In 1543 there were seven farmers in the community (each farmer at that time might have several workers and a family). It was also mentioned that native Sami people were living in the proximity.

== Geography ==
The closest larger city is Luleå, which is located some 35 kilometres (22 miles) southeast on the coast of the Gulf of Bothnia. Luleå is the largest city in Norrbotten County and hosts the main campus of Luleå University of Technology.

The main northern railway line, Stambanan genom övre Norrland, ends in Boden. By rail, Boden is connected to Luleå, and, on the same line, Uppsala, Stockholm, and finally Bräcke in the south.

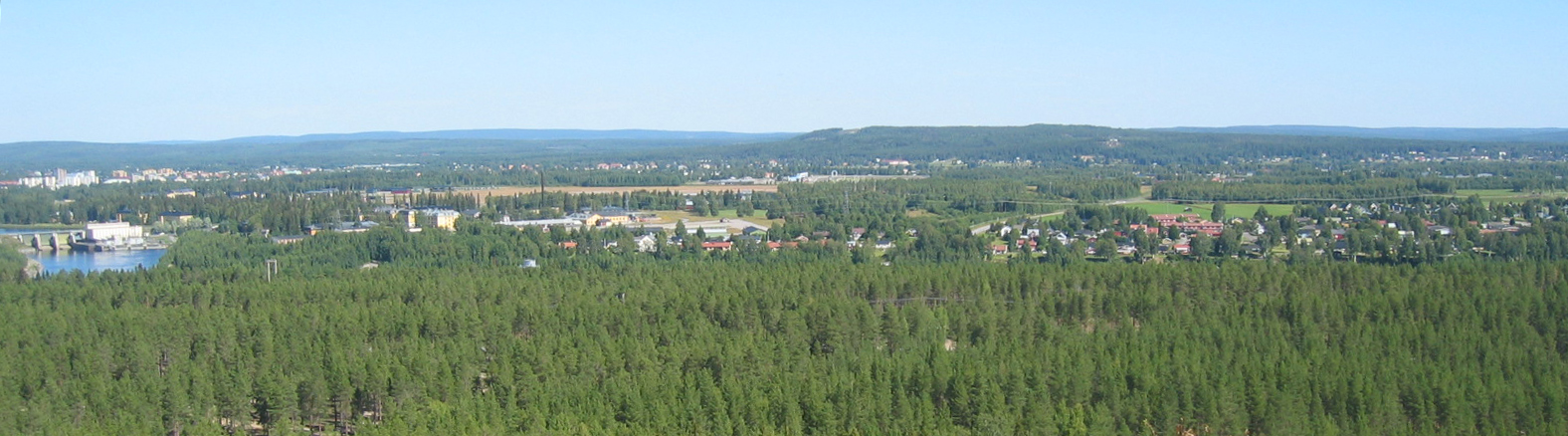
Southern Boden seen from Rödbergsfortet, part of Boden Fortress

=== Localities ===
There were six localities in the municipality as of 2018:

Locality	Population
Boden	16,816
Sävast	3,177
Trångforsen och Heden	1,860
Vittjärv	521
Harads	511
Unbyn	459

== Demographics ==
This is a demographic table based on Boden Municipality's electoral districts in the 2022 Swedish general election sourced from SVT's election platform, in turn taken from SCB official statistics.

In total there were 28,135 residents, including 22,002 Swedish citizens of voting age. 54.7% voted for the left coalition and 44.2% for the right coalition. Indicators are in percentage points except population totals and income.

Location	Residents	Citizen adults	Left vote	Right vote	Employed	Swedish parents	Foreign heritage	Income SEK	Degree
Location			%	%					
Björknäs	1,437	1,163	61.0	37.8	72	79	21	19,866	30
Bosvedjan-Unbyn	1,682	1,281	53.5	45.5	88	93	7	29,145	45
Centrum N	738	653	60.4	38.5	77	86	14	21,250	32
Centrum S	1,309	1,191	60.9	38.2	74	89	11	18,935	36
Erikslund-Fagersnäs	2,113	1,639	51.8	47.8	82	93	7	25,470	33
Gunnarsbyn	579	496	60.0	39.0	82	91	9	22,267	25
Harads	1,258	1,038	52.7	45.6	81	88	12	22,084	25
Heden-S Bredåker	1,498	1,149	45.5	53.2	88	93	7	27,863	33
Prästholmen	2,147	1,771	61.3	37.1	73	80	20	21,057	33
Sanden	1,800	1,475	55.9	43.3	82	86	14	24,609	40
Svartbjörsbyn	2,085	1,624	52.6	46.8	86	94	6	26,982	37
Svartbyn	2,369	1,808	57.1	42.2	90	94	6	29,858	51
Sveafältet	1,782	1,211	53.2	44.2	69	61	39	18,711	26
Sävast	1,875	1,376	58.5	40.5	86	91	9	28,725	53
Sävastön	1,801	1,302	50.0	48.4	89	90	10	31,017	55
Torpgärdan	1,167	911	55.9	43.6	80	86	14	25,647	38
Trångfors	1,309	1,028	54.1	45.5	90	96	4	31,021	47
Vittjärv-N Bredåker	1,186	906	47.9	51.5	88	93	7	28,972	37
Source: SVT

== Language ==
In Boden Municipality, as in all of Sweden, there is no "official" language, but Swedish is by far the mostly used one. Some people are also, due to the proximity to the Finnish border, proficient in Finnish, and a few speak Sami. Nowadays, due to immigration, a lot of languages from around the world can also be heard.

== International relations ==
=== Twin towns — Sister cities ===
Boden Municipality is twinned with:

- Alta, Norway
- Oulu, Finland (since 1948)
- Apatity, Russia

All of these are northerly located, only Oulu being on a more southern latitude than Boden.

== Notable natives ==
- Andreas Bäckman, racing driver
- Jessica Bäckman, racing driver
- Peter Englund, author, historian (tenth member of the Swedish Academy)
- Berit Granquist, fencer
- Eyvind Johnson, author (awarded the Nobel Prize in Literature in 1974)
- Niclas Wallin, ice hockey player (team member of the winner of the 2006 Stanley Cup Playoffs, the Carolina Hurricanes)

== Politics ==
Following 2018 elections the municipal council is dominated by the Social Democrats despite their losing two seats compared to the previous elections. Two regional parties, Aktiv samling – Bodenalternativet and Health Care Party of Norrbotten, performed well, gaining 10 seats between them in the 49-member council. The head of executive is Social Democrat Claes Nordmark.

Party	Votes	%	Seats	±
Social Democrats	6,555	34.17	17	−2
Moderate Party	3,075	16.03	8	−5
Aktiv samling – Bodenalternativet	2,338	12.19	6	+6
Sweden Democrats	1,806	9.41	5	−1
Health Care Party	1,557	8.12	4	+2
Left Party	1,227	6.40	3	−1
Centre Party	1,028	5.36	3	+2
Liberals	567	2.96	2	+1
Green Party	407	2.12	1	−1
Others	626	3.26		
Invalid/blank votes	255			
Total	19,441	86.13	49	-

== See also ==
- English Canal
- Boden Fortress
