= Vittjärvs IK =

Swedish football club

- Full name: Vittjärvs Idrottsklubb
- Founded: 1924
- Ground: Tjärnbacken Vittjärv; Boden; Sweden
- Chairman: Martin Olofsson
- League: Division 5 Norrbotten Mellersta
Home colours	Away colours

Vittjärvs IK is a Swedish football club located in Boden.

== Background ==
Vittjärvs IK currently plays in Division 5 Norrbotten Norra which is the seventh tier of Swedish football. They play their home matches at the Tjärnbacken Vittjärv in Boden.

The club is affiliated to Norrbottens Fotbollförbund.

== Season to season ==
In their most successful period Vittjärvs IK competed in the following divisions:

Season	Level	Division	Section	Position	Movements
1961	Tier 4	Division 4	Norrbotten Södra	5th	
1962	Tier 4	Division 4	Norrbotten Södra	7th	
1963	Tier 4	Division 4	Norrbotten Södra	1st	Promoted
1964	Tier 3	Division 3	Norra Norrland Övre	7th	
1965	Tier 3	Division 3	Norra Norrland Övre	4th	
1966	Tier 3	Division 3	Norra Norrland Övre	5th	
1967	Tier 3	Division 3	Norra Norrland Övre	10th	Relegated
1968	Tier 4	Division 4	Norrbotten Södra	9th	Relegated

In recent seasons Vittjärvs IK have competed in the following divisions:

Season	Level	Division	Section	Position	Movements
1999	Tier 6	Division 5	Norrbotten Mellersta	1st	Promoted
2000	Tier 5	Division 4	Norrbotten Södra	6th	
2001	Tier 5	Division 4	Norrbotten Södra	7th	
2002	Tier 5	Division 4	Norrbotten Södra	7th	
2003	Tier 5	Division 4	Norrbotten Södra	9th	Relegated
2004	Tier 6	Division 5	Norrbotten Mellersta	2nd	Promoted
2005	Tier 5	Division 4	Norrbotten Södra	4th	
2006*	Tier 6	Division 4	Norrbotten Södra	11th	Relegated
2007	Tier 7	Division 5	Norrbotten Södra	5th	
2008	Tier 7	Division 5	Norrbotten Södra	3rd	
2009	Tier 7	Division 5	Norrbotten Norra	3rd	
2010	Tier 7	Division 5	Norrbotten Norra	2nd	Promoted
2011	Tier 6	Division 4	Norrbotten Norra	10th	Relegated

* League restructuring in 2006 resulted in a new division being created at Tier 3 and subsequent divisions dropping a level.
