= European Championship in Forestry Skills =

The European Championship in Forestry Skills is a competition in forestry skills among students from European forestry and agricultural colleges, staged each year since 2002. The students are formed into teams and tested in various disciplines.

== Goals ==
The short‐term goal of the competition is the presentation of the latest achievements in logging techniques, logging machinery tools and loggers safety equipment and a comparison of these at an international level in theory and practice.

The long‐term aim of the competitions is to increase the appreciation of forest work and to draw general attention to forestry training and the forestry industry on both a national and international level. These competitions play a particularly significant role in creating international contacts between students and schools, which contribute to the furthering peaceful coexistence between nations.

== Structure ==
This competition is a team competition between schools of the EU. The best team from each country may attend the competition. Students who are in forestry training and between 16 – 25 years of age are eligible to compete. A team consists of four participants. Each participant must compete in theory and practice components.

In planning and carrying out the competitions, special attention is paid to safety aspects in working techniques.

The competition consists of two parts. First part is demonstrating specific knowledge of working with a chainsaw and consists of five disciplines (Fitting a new chain, Bucking by combined cut, Precision bucking, Undercut and Felling Cut, and Limbing).

The second part is demonstrating knowledge about forests. This part takes place over an approximately 3 km long orientation course, within which are 16 points. At each point the competitors must demonstrate their knowledge of forest surveying, or recognize tree and animal species, forest pests and diseases of trees. The winner is the one country whose competitors achieve the highest number of points from both parts.

=== Point scoring ===
==== Technical events – individual ====
Event I	Fitting a new chain	total 140 pts.
Event II	Bucking by combined cut	total 260 pts.
Event III	Precision bucking	total 310 pts.
Event IV	Undercut and felling cut	total 660 pts.
Event V	Limbing	total 442 pts.

==== Forestry course - team ====
Event VI	Forestry course	total 6000 pts.

== Host nations and prize winners ==
	year	organizer of the competition	1st place	2nd place	3rd place
1.	2002	Austria	Austria	Finland	Lithuania
2.	2003	Finland	Estonia	Finland	Austria
3.	2004	Estonia	Estonia	Slovenia	Austria
4.	2005	Lithuania	Austria	Germany	Slovenia
5.	2006	Austria	Austria	Slovenia	Germany
6.	2007	Belgium	Austria	Italy	Lithuania
7.	2008	Norway	Slovenia	Austria	Germany
8.	2009	Germany	Austria	Slovenia	Poland
9.	2010	Luxemburg	Austria	Slovenia	Estonia
10.	2011	Poland	Austria	Germany	Poland
11.	2012	Slovenia	Slovenia	Austria	Norway
12.	2013	Austria	Slovenia	Austria	Italy
13.	2014	Italy	Austria	Italy	Slovenia
14.	2015	Estonia	Germany	Estonia	Italy
15.	2016	Austria	Austria	Slovenia	Italy
16.	2017	Switzerland	Austria	Switzerland	Romania
17.	2018	Hungary	Slovenia	Austria	Romania
18.	2019	Sweden	Austria	Italy	Romania
