= Gammelstadsviken, Norbotten =

Lake in Luleå municipality, Sweden

Gammelstadsviken
- Lake
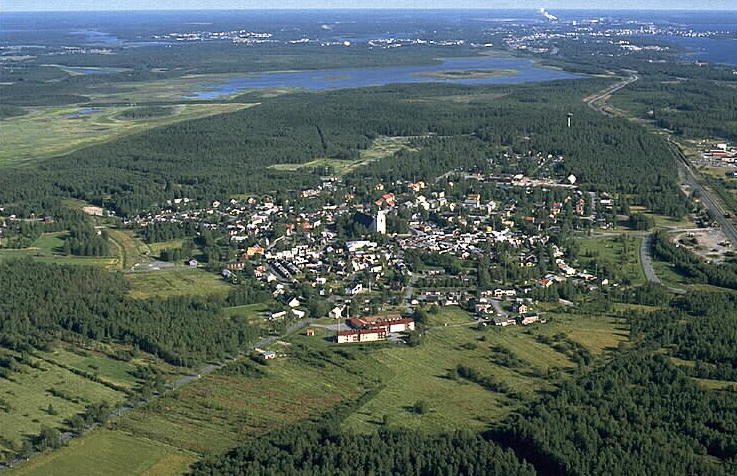
- Gammelstad Church Town and Gammelstadsviken, August 8, 1994.
- Interactive map of Gammelstadsviken
- Location: Sweden
- Coordinates: 65°37′47.78″N 22°4′55.63″E
- Surface area: 2.19 km^{2} (0.85 sq mi)
- Surface elevation: 2 m (6 ft 7 in)

Gammelstadsviken is a lake located in Luleå Municipality, in the province of Norrbotten, and is part of the Altersundet–Luleälven coastal area. The lake is a shallow clay plain lake, has an area of 2.19 square kilometres and has an elevation of 2 metres above sea level. It also has a low water turnover due to small catchment area and low precipitation in the coastal area, and its water depth does not exceed 4 m. This means that it is slowly becoming overgrown, today not due to land uplift, but due to subsidence by mud deposits and aquatic vegetation. Gammelstadsviken is located 5 km northwest of Luleå in the Gammelstadsviken Natura 2000 area. The lake was previously a sea bay but is now drained by the watercourse Sellingsundet. Gammelstadsviken has a rich bird fauna, of both migrating, resting and breeding birds: about 200 bird species have been observed at the lake.

== History ==
Gammelstadsviken was once part of the same sea bay as Mjölkuddtjärnen, and they are ecologically connected, as they were part of the same water surface several hundred years ago. Today, the sea level is a few metres lower due to tectonic uplift. In the past, this was one of the entry routes to Gammelstaden, as sea routes reached both north and south of Porsön, and further through Gammelstadsviken. The harbour itself was relocated depending on the sea level, but for a long time, it was located below the current Hägnan. In the middle of the 17th century, the town and its port were moved to present-day Luleå. Gammelstadsviken was also the route for peole who travelled to the church and the church town on weekends.

The beaches around the bay were once used for cultivation, pastures, and hayfields. Much of this is now overgrown with forest but still bears traces of cultivation, including ditches. From Porsön to Köpmanholmen, across Sellingsundet, there is a constructed marsh path, the so-called Brännvinsstigen. Sellingsundet was named after the surveyor and engineer Theodor Selling, who had his farm on Köpmanholmen. Selling had the road built in the middle of the 19th century with the help of workers with alcohol problems. Rumour has it that they were not only given food and shelter at Köpmanholmen but also paid in drinks, hence the name of the path. At the bridge over Sellingsundet, there are remains of a dam from the early 19th century. There were also plans to lower Gammelstadsviken through a canal to Notviken in the river to extract more farmland. But the drop was too small for the project to have any effect. Gammelstadsviken was thus spared the development that took place at Persöfjärden, which was lowered by almost 2 metres in the 20th century. If this had happened in Gammelstadsviken, it would be largely overgrown with aquatic vegetation today.

== Geography ==
Gammelstadsviken has kept its name bay, even though it is now a lake. The lake drains via Sellingsundet to Björsbyfjärden, Sörfjärden and Mulöfjärden at Bensbyn. It is currently separated from the sea by dams built at Bensbyn and Lulsundet. The purpose of these dams is to maintain the water level in Björsbyfjärden, Sörfjärden and Björkskatafjärden. However, these dams do not significantly affect the water level of Gammelstad Bay.

== Environment and accessibility ==
Gammelstadsviken is close to several residential areas, but forest areas separate the lake from them. The bay is limited on the south and west sides by roads and railways. There are no possible visitor routes into the reserve. The main entrances today are from Porsön, from the old Haparandavägen and from the Hägnan open-air museum. A hiking trail connects these three entrances. One problem for visitors is that the distance to the birds is often long and the views of the water too few. It is really only from the bird tower that you can look out over the water surface, and there are long distances such as hundreds of metres up to a kilometre from the bird flocks. From the European route E4 and highway 97 there is no access at all to the bay.

In an agreement between Luleå Municipality, the Swedish Society for Nature Conservation in Luleå, the County Administrative Board of Norrbotten County and the Swedish Ornithological Society, the Gold Edge project around Gammelstadsviken has been launched. Together they will develop measures to preserve and develop the area. The project will run for five years, until 2016, and has received financial support from a LONA grant (local nature conservation initiative). During the summer of 2014, much work was carried out in the surrounding area, paths were cleared and footpaths renovated. When the Facebook halls in the vicinity of Gammelstadsviken, five million SEK was also earmarked to compensate the bird life and bird watchers.

== Ecology ==
Gammelstadsviken is a significant bird lake, characterized by its clay plain formation. In many aspects of vegetation and animal life, it bears resemblance to famous bird lakes to the south, such as Tåkern and Kvismaresjöarna.

== Birds ==
At the lake there are bird species such as greylag geese, garganey, tufted ducks, goldeneyes, goosanders, Eurasian wigeon, mallards, common sandpipers, western marsh harriers, Eurasian coots, great crested grebes, red-necked grebes, whooper swans, ural owls, rustic buntings, black-headed gulls and little gulls. Both ospreys and white-tailed eagles also inhabit the lake. In the surrounding forests, hazel grouse, black grouse and pygmy owls can be found. Several of these bird species are listed as threatened to varying degrees; slavonian grebe, Eurasian curlew, stock dove, common pochard, gadwall, smew, pintail and shoveler.

== Mammals ==
In the surrounding forests and the wetlands of the lake, there is a large population of elk. They are often seen grazing around the bay. Both beaver and muskrat are present in the lake.

== Amphibians ==
The bay is a breeding ground for moor frogs, common frogs and common toads.

== Sub-catchment area ==
Gammelstadsviken is part of the sub-basin (729733–178775) that SMHI calls the outlet of Gammelstadsviken. The average height is 12 metres above sea level and the area is 19.4 square kilometres. There are no catchment areas upstream; the catchment area is the highest point. Sellingsundet, which drains the catchment area, has tributary order 2, which means that the water flows through a total of 2 watercourses before reaching the sea after 11 kilometres. The catchment area consists mostly of forest (67%). The catchment area has 2.14 square kilometres of water surface, giving it a lake percentage of 11 percent. The settlements in the area cover an area of 1.44 square kilometres or 7 percent of the catchment area.
