= Ralph Lundsten =

Swedish electronic music composer (1936–2023)

- Born: Ralph Harold Lundsten; 6 October 1936; Ersnäs, Norrbotten, Sweden
- Died: 5 July 2023 (aged 86)
- Occupation: Composer
- Website: https://www.andromeda.se

Ralph Harold Lundsten (6 October 1936 – 5 July 2023) was a Swedish composer, widely regarded as a pioneer of electronic music in Scandinavia. In addition to his musical work, he was also active as a film director, visual artist, and author. Over the course of his career, he released more than 80 albums, often exploring themes related to nature, Nordic mysticism, and futurism.

Among his recognitions, he received the Illis quorum medal from the Swedish government in 2008 for his contributions to Swedish culture, and his piece Out in the Wide World was used for decades as the interval signal of Radio Sweden International.

== Life and career ==
Lundsten was born and raised in Ersnäs, in the northern Swedish province of Norrbotten. He later settled in Nacka, on the outskirts of Stockholm, where he lived in a distinctive pink wooden mansion built in 1878, known as Castle Frankenburg. The house also served as the location of his private electronic music workshop, the Andromeda Studio, one of the earliest studios of its kind in Sweden.

During the 1950s, Lundsten began constructing his own electronic musical instruments and experimenting with sound, positioning himself among the earliest pioneers of electronic music in Sweden. He worked independently, developing a unique musical language that blended synthesizers with themes drawn from nature, Nordic mythology, and science fiction. In parallel with his musical work, he also produced experimental films and multimedia exhibitions.

His composition Out in the Wide World gained widespread recognition as the interval signal for Radio Sweden International’s shortwave broadcasts, becoming one of the most familiar sonic identifiers of Swedish radio abroad. Additionally, a modified excerpt from his 1970 track Nattmara was used by Sveriges Utbildningsradio (Swedish Educational Broadcasting Company) as intermission music during long breaks in educational television programming on Sveriges Television (SVT) throughout the late 1970s.

== Awards ==
In 2008, Lundsten received the Illis quorum medal from the Swedish government in recognition of his cultural impact and contributions to the arts.

== Albums ==
- 1966 – Dokumentation 1 (Elektronmusikstudion). ('The electronic music studio')
- 1967 – MUMS (Musik under miljoner stjärnor). 'Music beneath millions of stars'
- 1968 – Elektronisk musik (with Leo Nilson). 'Electronic music'
- 1969 – Tellus. Fågel Blå. 'Tellus. Blue Bird'
- 1969 – Svit för elektroniskt dragspel. 'Suite for electronic accordion'
- 1970 – Erik XIV och Ristningar. 'Erik XIV and Carvings'
- 1970 – Ölskog. 'Beer forest'
- 1971 – Gustav III/Nattmara 'Nightmare'
- 1972 – Fadervår. 'Our Father'
- 1973 – Strömkarlen: Nordisk natursymfoni nr 1. 'The Water Sprite: Nordic Nature Symphony No. 1'
- 1973 – Skräck och skratt, resor i okända världar. 'Horror and laughter, trips in unknown worlds'
- 1975 – Shangri-La
- 1975 – Johannes och huldran: Nordisk natursymfoni nr 2. 'Johannes and the Lady of the Woods: Nordic Nature Symphony No. 2'
- 1976 – Cosmic Love
- 1977 – Ralph Lundsten's Universe
- 1978 – Discophrenia
- 1979 – Alpha Ralpha Boulevard
- 1980 – Paradissymfonin. 'Paradise Symphony'
- 1981 – En midvintersaga: Nordisk natursymfoni nr 3. 'A Midwinter Saga: Nordic Nature Symphony No. 3'
- 1982 – The New Age
- 1983 – En sommarsaga: Nordisk natursymfoni nr 4 'A Summer Saga: Nordic Nature Symphony No. 4/Pop Age'
- 1984 – Trolltagen: Nordisk natursymfoni nr 5 '(Bewitched: Nordic Nature Symphony No. 5)/Dreamscape'
- 1985 – Välkommen (contains The Ages of Man). 'Welcome'
- 1986 – Fantasia by Starlight – 星夜幻想 (CD/LP/cassette published in Japan). 'Starry night fantasy'
- 1986 – The Dream Master
- 1990 – Johannes och huldran (Max von Sydow reads Gustav Sandgren's story "Johannes och huldran", accompanied by Lundsten's music) 'Johannes and the lady of the woods'
- 1992 – Drömmarnas landskap: Nordisk natursymfoni nr 6. 'Landscape of Dreams: Nordic Nature Symphony No. 6'
- 1993 – Nordic Light
- 1994 – The Joy of Being
- 1995 – In Time and Space
- 1996 – Inspiration—Sweden (contains "Landscape of Dreams" and "Our Father") (EMI Classics)
- 1996 – Årstiderna: Nordisk natursymfoni nr 7. 'The Seasons: Nordic Nature Symphony No. 7'
- 2002 – En själens vagabond. 'A Vagabond of the Soul'
- 2003 – Cosmic Phantazy
- 2004 – På drömda stigar. 'Pathways of the Mind'
- 2005 – Like the wind my longing – Classic pearls 1972–2004
- 2007 – Ut i vida världen 'Out in the Wide World': Symphonia Linnæi (Latin: Symphony of Linnaeus), Out in the Wide World, In the early Days of Summer, Song of the Mermaids, A Summer Saga (first performance)
- 2007 – Lovetopia
- 2008 – Electronic Music from the 60s and 70s (a boxed set composed of four previously released CDs)
- 2008 – Dance in the Endless Night
- 2010 – I sagans värld
- 2013 – River of Time
- 2020 – I svunnen tid
