= Kallax =

- Location within Norrbotten Location within Sweden
- Coordinates: 65°31′30″N 22°03′30″E
- Country: Sweden
- Province: Norrbotten
- County: Norrbotten County
- Municipality: Luleå Municipality

Area
  - Total: 0.86 km^{2} (0.33 sq mi)

Population (31 December 2010)
  - Total: 321
  - Density: 375/km^{2} (970/sq mi)
- Time zone: UTC+1 (CET)
  - Summer (DST): UTC+2 (CEST)

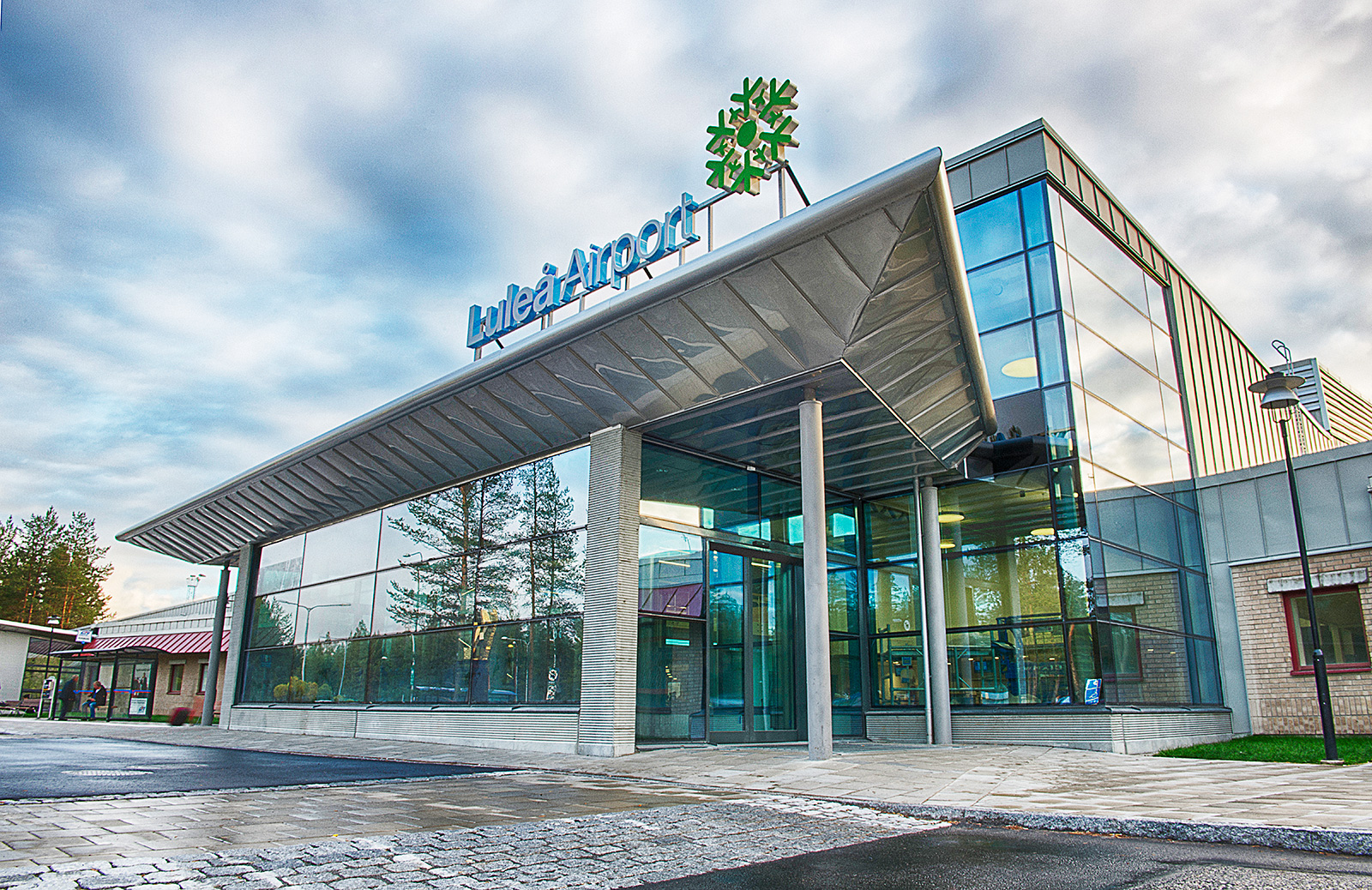
Luleå airport, which is located close to Kallax

Kallax (Meänkieli: Kalalaksi, lit. fish bay) is a locality situated in Luleå Municipality, Norrbotten County, Sweden with 321 inhabitants in 2010. Luleå Airport is situated near Kallax.

The KALLAX shelf from IKEA is named after the village.
