= Råneå =

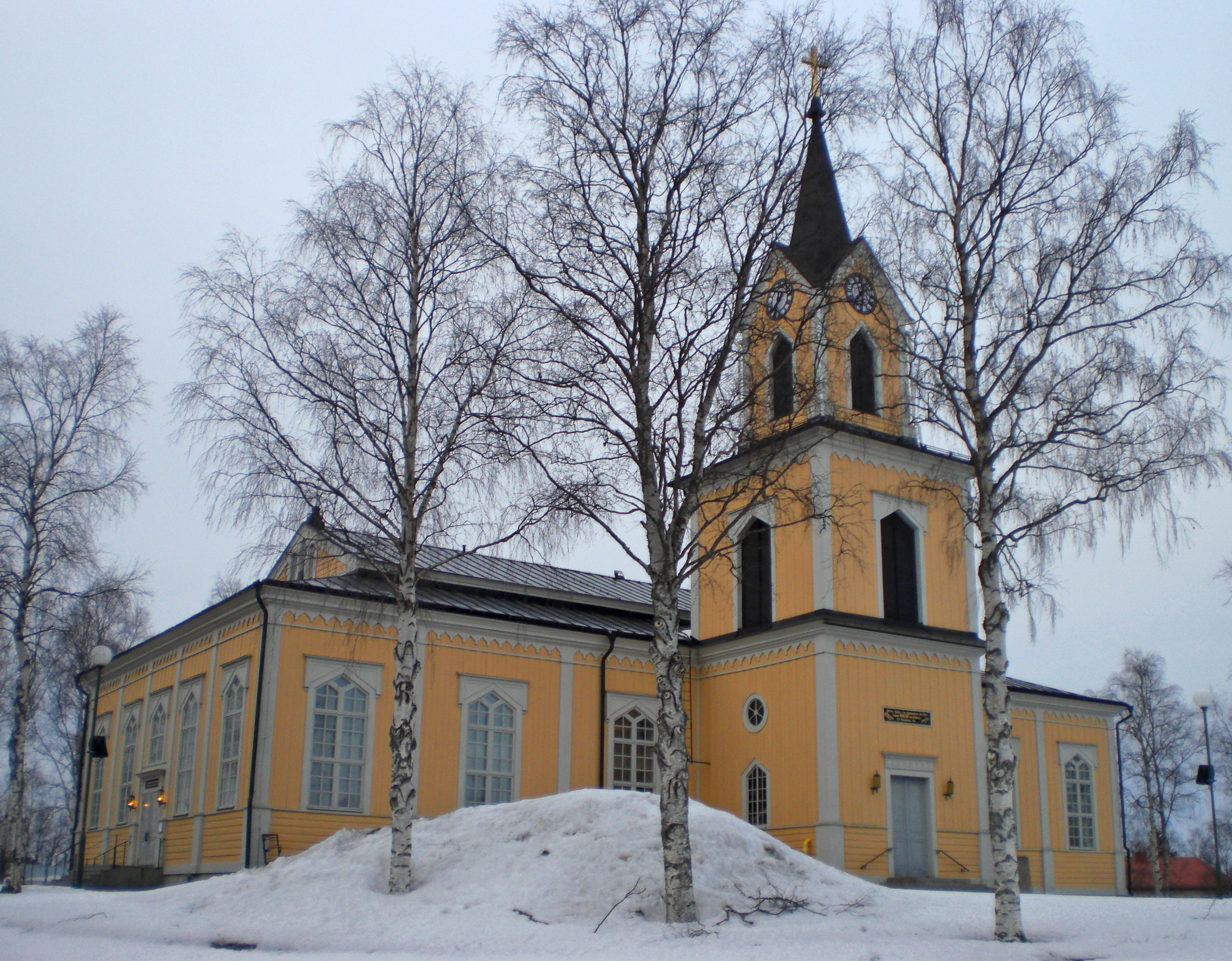
- Råneå Church

- Location within Norrbotten Location within Sweden
- Coordinates: 65°51′24″N 22°17′22″E
- Country: Sweden
- Province: Norrbotten
- County: Norrbotten County
- Municipality: Luleå Municipality

Area
  - Total: 2.05 km^{2} (0.79 sq mi)

Population (31 December 2010)
  - Total: 1,912
  - Density: 931/km^{2} (2,410/sq mi)
- Time zone: UTC+1 (CET)
  - Summer (DST): UTC+2 (CEST)

Råneå (Swedish pronunciation: [ˈrǒːnɛɔ]) is a locality situated in Luleå Municipality, Norrbotten County, Sweden with 1,912 inhabitants in 2010.
