= Lulsundet =

- Residential area
- Interactive map of Lulsundet
- Coordinates: 65°36′10″N 22°10′45″E
- Country: Sweden
- Province: Norrbotten
- County: Norrbotten County
- Municipality: Luleå Municipality

Population (2010)
  - Total: 984
- Time zone: UTC+1 (CET)
  - Summer (DST): UTC+2 (CEST)

Lulsundet is a residential area in Luleå, Sweden. It had 984 inhabitants in 2010.
