= Rutvik =

- Location within Norrbotten Location within Sweden
- Coordinates: 65°40′30″N 22°05′20″E
- Country: Sweden
- Province: Norrbotten
- County: Norrbotten County
- Municipality: Luleå Municipality

Area
  - Total: 0.74 km^{2} (0.29 sq mi)

Population (31 December 2010)
  - Total: 839
  - Density: 1,137/km^{2} (2,940/sq mi)
- Time zone: UTC+1 (CET)
  - Summer (DST): UTC+2 (CEST)

Rutvik is a locality situated in Luleå Municipality, Norrbotten County, Sweden with 839 inhabitants in 2010. The locality consists of four areas. The village of Rutvik, Brännan to north, Flarken in the west and Rutviksreveln to the east.

The village has a history as early as 1339, documented in the testament of the Rutvik local Svenalde. The population has expanded heavily since the 1970s after industrial expansions were made in central Luleå. Before the population boom, farming was the main industry of the village. In recent years there are no active farms, but horse enthusiasts have stables and keep the grasslands open. There are no significant watercourses, except a shallow creek and some smaller lakes in the surrounding forests.

Since 1938, Rutvik also has a sports club which practices football, ice-hockey and cross-country skiing. The village also has its own golf course which attracts people from many parts of the municipality. The village has its own school and daycare, but students from grade 7 and older have to go to the neighbouring village of Gammelstad or to Luleå city.
