= Notviken =

- Residential area
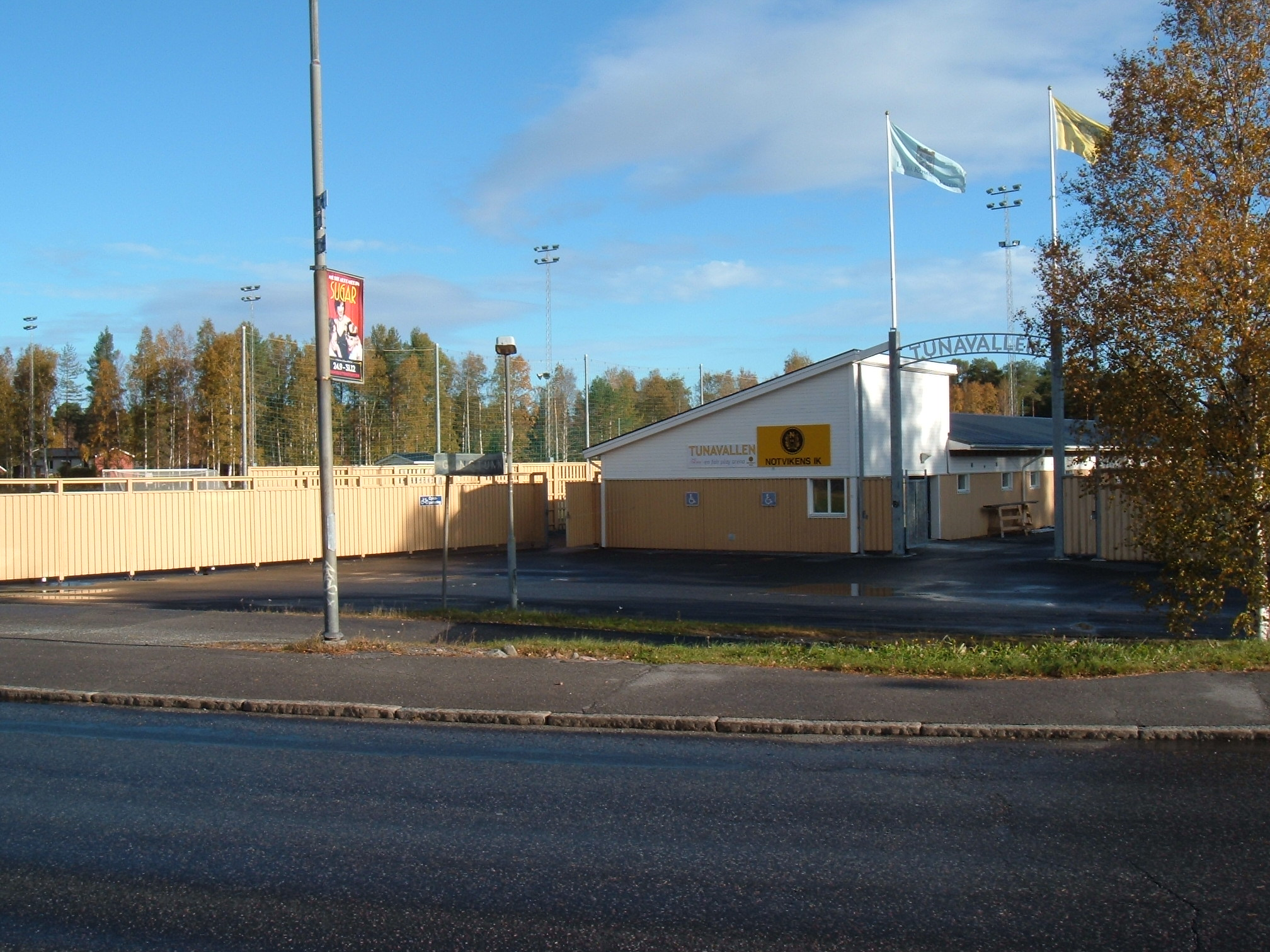
- Tunavallen, a sports facility in Notviken
- Interactive map of Notviken
- Coordinates: 65°36′40″N 22°05′50″E
- Country: Sweden
- Province: Norrbotten
- County: Norrbotten County
- Municipality: Luleå Municipality

Population (2010)
  - Total: 2,518
- Time zone: UTC+1 (CET)
  - Summer (DST): UTC+2 (CEST)

Notviken is a residential area in Luleå, Sweden. It had 2,518 inhabitants in 2010.
