= Gäddvik =

Gäddvik can refer to the following places:

- Gäddvik, the Swedish name for the district of Haukilahti in Espoo, Finland
- Gäddvik, Luleå, a village in Luleå Municipality, Sweden
