= Persön =

- Location within Norrbotten Location within Sweden
- Coordinates: 65°45′N 22°10′E
- Country: Sweden
- Province: Norrbotten
- County: Norrbotten County
- Municipality: Luleå Municipality

Area
  - Total: 0.45 km^{2} (0.17 sq mi)

Population (31 December 2010)
  - Total: 223
  - Density: 492/km^{2} (1,270/sq mi)
- Time zone: UTC+1 (CET)
  - Summer (DST): UTC+2 (CEST)

Persön is a locality situated in Luleå Municipality, Norrbotten County, Sweden with 223 inhabitants in 2010.
