= Bälinge =

Bälinge may refer to:

- Bälinge, Luleå, an urban area in Luleå Municipality, Sweden
- Bälinge, Uppsala Municipality, an urban area in Uppsala Municipality, Sweden
- Bälinge IF, a sports club in Bälinge, Uppsala Municipality
