= Karlsvik =

- Location within Norrbotten Location within Sweden
- Coordinates: 65°36′N 22°04′E
- Country: Sweden
- Province: Norrbotten
- County: Norrbotten County
- Municipality: Luleå Municipality

Area
  - Total: 0.23 km^{2} (0.089 sq mi)

Population (31 December 2010)
  - Total: 256
  - Density: 1,108/km^{2} (2,870/sq mi)
- Time zone: UTC+1 (CET)
  - Summer (DST): UTC+2 (CEST)

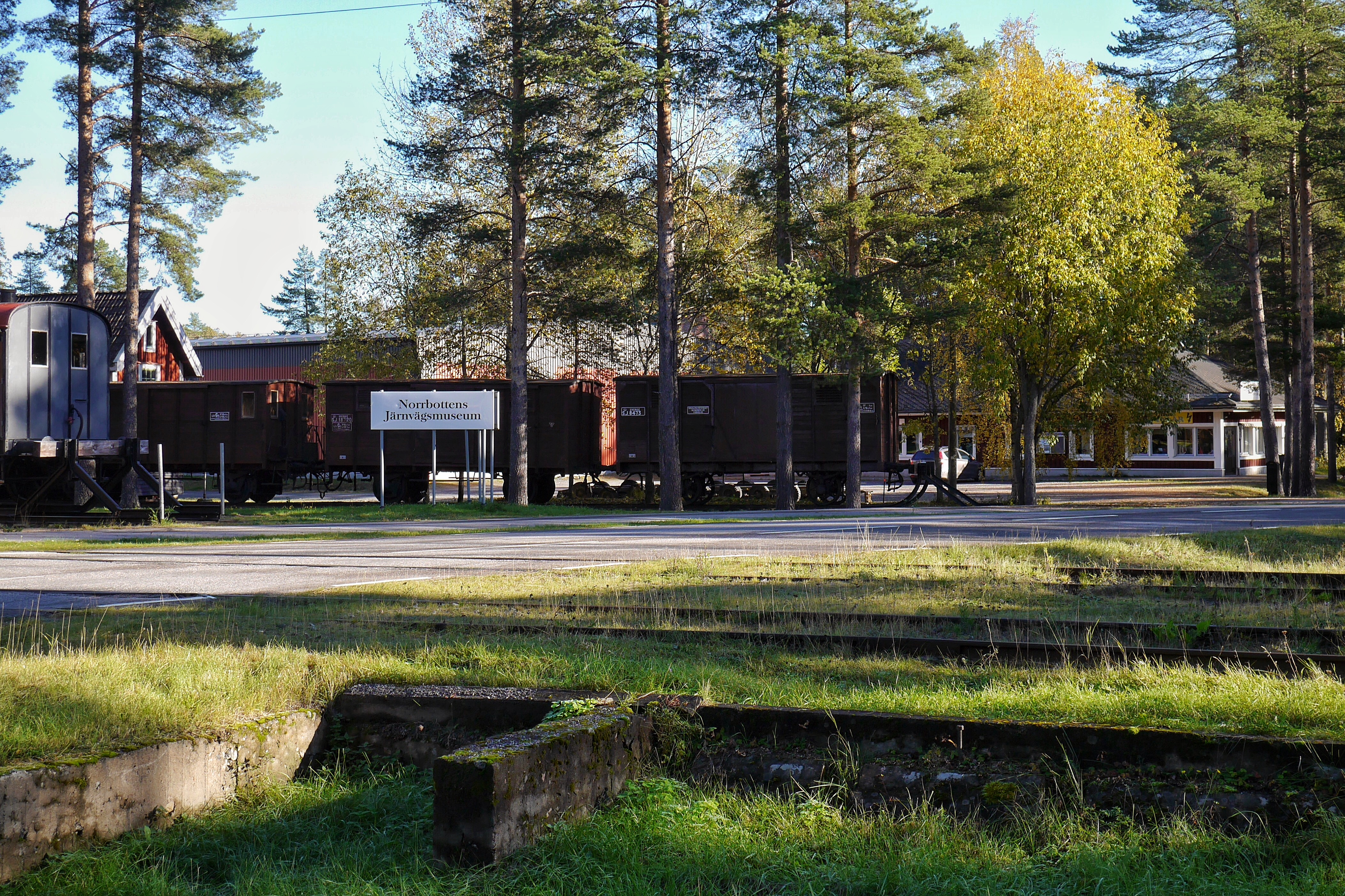
Norrbotten Railway Museum, one of Sweden's largest railway museums located in the old industrial community of Karlsvik, 6 km from the center of Luleå.

Karlsvik is a locality situated in Luleå Municipality, Norrbotten County, Sweden with 256 inhabitants in 2010.
