= Klöverträsk =

- Location within Norrbotten Location within Sweden
- Coordinates: 65°38′N 21°23′E
- Country: Sweden
- Province: Norrbotten
- County: Norrbotten County
- Municipality: Luleå Municipality

Area
  - Total: 0.67 km^{2} (0.26 sq mi)

Population (31 December 2010)
  - Total: 246
  - Density: 370/km^{2} (960/sq mi)
- Time zone: UTC+1 (CET)
  - Summer (DST): UTC+2 (CEST)

Klöverträsk is a locality situated in Luleå Municipality, Norrbotten County, Sweden with 246 inhabitants in 2010.
