= Gäddvik, Luleå =

Village in Luleå Municipality, Sweden

Coordinates: 65°34′45″N 22°02′25″E

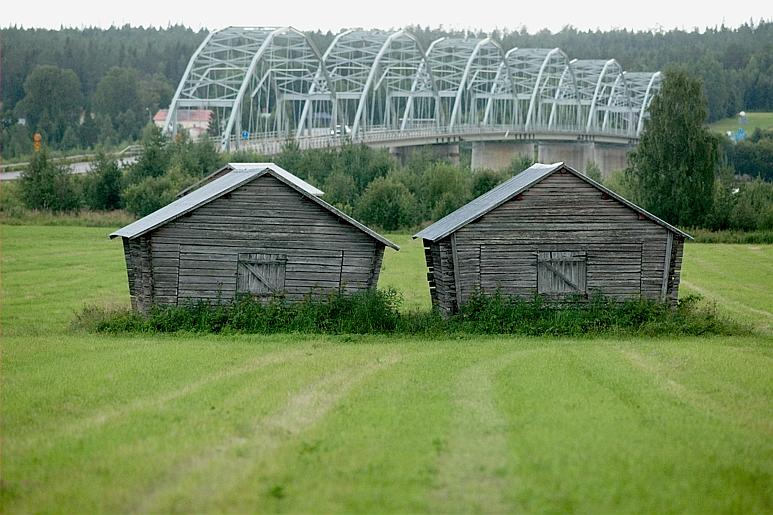
Restored hay storehouses in Gäddvik in 2002. The Gäddviksbron bridge is in the background.

Gäddvik is a rural village on both sides of the Lule River right west of Bergnäset in the Nederludeå socken in Luleå Municipality, Sweden. The sides of the village are called Södra Gäddvik and Norra Gäddvik. A part of Södra Gäddvik is classified as an area simply called Gäddvik. 53 of the 114 inhabitants of the village (2010) live there. Norra Gäddvik has 61 inhabitants (2010).

== History ==
There has been a national road along Norrlandskusten through Gäddvik since the Middle Ages. A bridge called Gamla Gäddviksbron was built in 1941. In 1978, the traffic on the European route E4 was moved to Nya Gäddviksbron.

== Society ==
There is a Swedish Evangelical Mission garden "Sundet" with camping facilities in summer time in Gäddvik.
