= Antnäs =

- Location within Norrbotten Location within Sweden
- Coordinates: 65°33′N 21°52′E
- Country: Sweden
- Province: Norrbotten
- County: Norrbotten County
- Municipality: Luleå Municipality

Area
  - Total: 0.90 km^{2} (0.35 sq mi)

Population (31 December 2010)
  - Total: 822
  - Density: 916/km^{2} (2,370/sq mi)
- Time zone: UTC+1 (CET)
  - Summer (DST): UTC+2 (CEST)

Antnäs is a locality situated in Luleå Municipality, Norrbotten County, Sweden with 822 inhabitants in 2010.
