= Hertsön (district) =

- Residential area
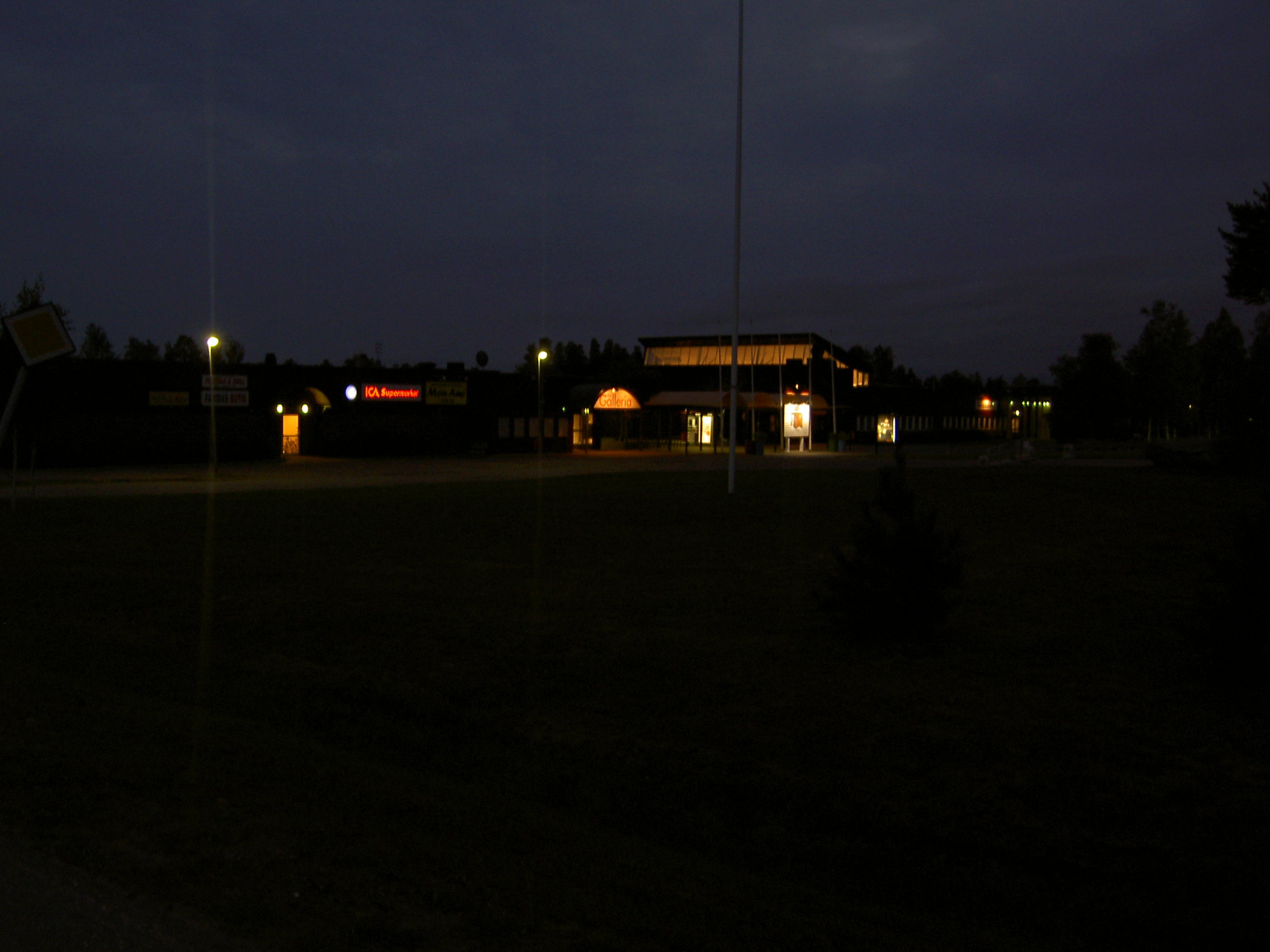
- Hertsön central square
- Interactive map of Hertsön
- Coordinates: 65°35′N 22°16′E
- Country: Sweden
- Province: Norrbotten
- County: Norrbotten County
- Municipality: Luleå Municipality

Population (2010)
  - Total: 5,436
- Time zone: UTC+1 (CET)
  - Summer (DST): UTC+2 (CEST)

Hertsön is a residential area in Luleå, Sweden. It had 5,436 inhabitants in 2010, making it one of the largest districts in Luleå.

The district was built in the 1970s as part of the Million Programme, due to the planned construction of a new steel mill (Stålverk 80, a major expansion of the existing Norrbottens Järnverk steelworks), which was expected to give the city a large increase in population. As the plans of the new steel mill were binned, following the victory of the centre/right-wing coalition in the general election of 1976, there have periodically been many empty apartments in the area.
