= Altersundet =

- Location of the mouth in Sweden

Location
- Country: Sweden
- County: Norrbotten
- Municipality: Luleå

Physical characteristics
- Source: Persöfjärden
  - coordinates: 65°45′13″N 22°07′45″E
- Mouth: Bothnian Bay
  - coordinates: 65°41′45″N 22°15′15″E
- Length: 8 km (5.0 mi)
- Basin size: 402.9 km^{2} (155.6 sq mi)

Altersundet is a river in Sweden.
