= Ersnäs IF =

Swedish football club

- Full name: Ersnäs Idrottsförening
- Founded: 1933
- Ground: Pålbacka; Luleå; Sweden
- League: Division 4 Norrbotten Södra
Home colours	Away colours

Ersnäs IF is a Swedish football club located in Ersnäs, Luleå.

== Background ==
Ersnäs IF currently plays in Division 4 Norrbotten Södra which is the sixth tier of Swedish football. They play their home matches at the Pålbacka in Luleå.

The club is affiliated to Norrbottens Fotbollförbund.

== Season to season ==
In their most successful period Ersnäs IF competed in the following divisions:

Season	Level	Division	Section	Position	Movements
1956–57	Tier 4	Division 4	Norrbotten Södra	7th	
1957–58	Tier 4	Division 4	Norrbotten Södra	2nd	
1959	Tier 4	Division 4	Norrbotten Södra	2nd	
1960	Tier 4	Division 4	Norrbotten Södra	9th	Relegated

In recent seasons Ersnäs IF have competed in the following divisions:

Season	Level	Division	Section	Position	Movements
1999	Tier 6	Division 5	Norrbotten Mellersta	2nd	Promoted
2000	Tier 5	Division 4	Norrbotten Södra	7th	
2001	Tier 5	Division 4	Norrbotten Södra	2nd	Promotion Playoffs
2002	Tier 5	Division 4	Norrbotten Södra	6th	
2003	Tier 5	Division 4	Norrbotten Södra	11th	Relegated
2004	Tier 6	Division 5	Norrbotten Mellersta	3rd	
2005	Tier 6	Division 5	Norrbotten Södra	1st	Promoted
2006*	Tier 6	Division 4	Norrbotten Södra	9th	
2007	Tier 6	Division 4	Norrbotten Södra	10th	Relegated
2008	Tier 7	Division 5	Norrbotten Södra	5th	
2009	Tier 7	Division 5	Norrbotten Södra	3rd	
2010	Tier 7	Division 5	Norrbotten Södra	2nd	Promoted
2011	Tier 6	Division 4	Norrbotten Södra	9th	

* League restructuring in 2006 resulted in a new division being created at Tier 3 and subsequent divisions dropping a level.
