= Nederluleå Church =

Coordinates: 65°38′44″N 22°01′41″E

- Nederluleå kyrka
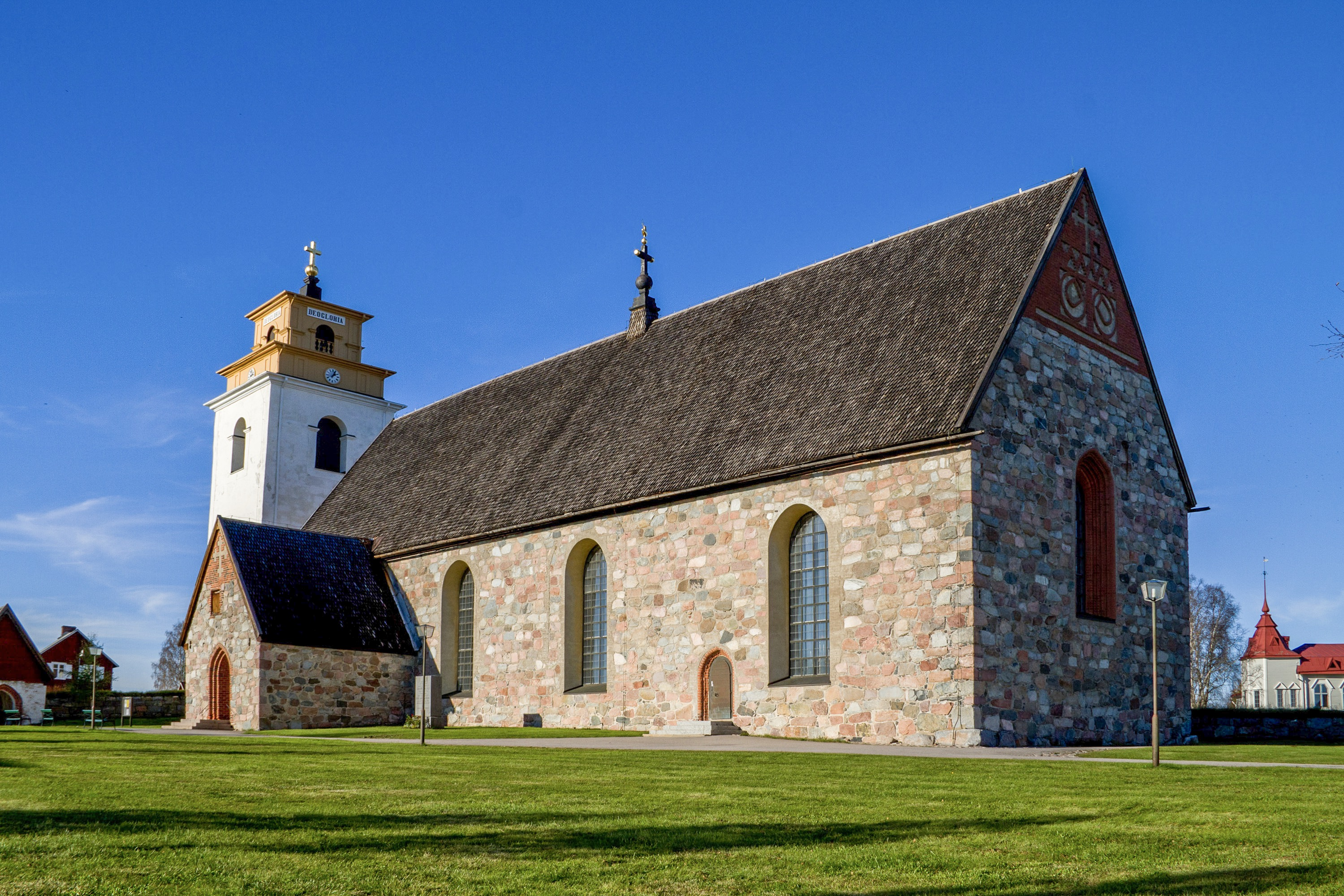
- Nederluleå Church, October 2011
- Nederluleå Church
- Location: Gammelstaden
- Country: Sweden
- Denomination: Church of Sweden
- Previous denomination: Roman Catholic Church

History
- Status: Active
- Dedication: Saint Peter

Architecture
- Functional status: Parish church

Administration
- Diocese: Diocese of Luleå

Nederluleå Church (Swedish: Nederluleå kyrka) is a medieval Church of Sweden parish church in Gammelstaden near Luleå in Norrbotten County, Sweden. It belongs to the Diocese of Luleå. The church is the largest medieval church in the Swedish land of Norrland. It forms a part of the UNESCO World Heritage Site Gammelstad Church Town.

== History ==
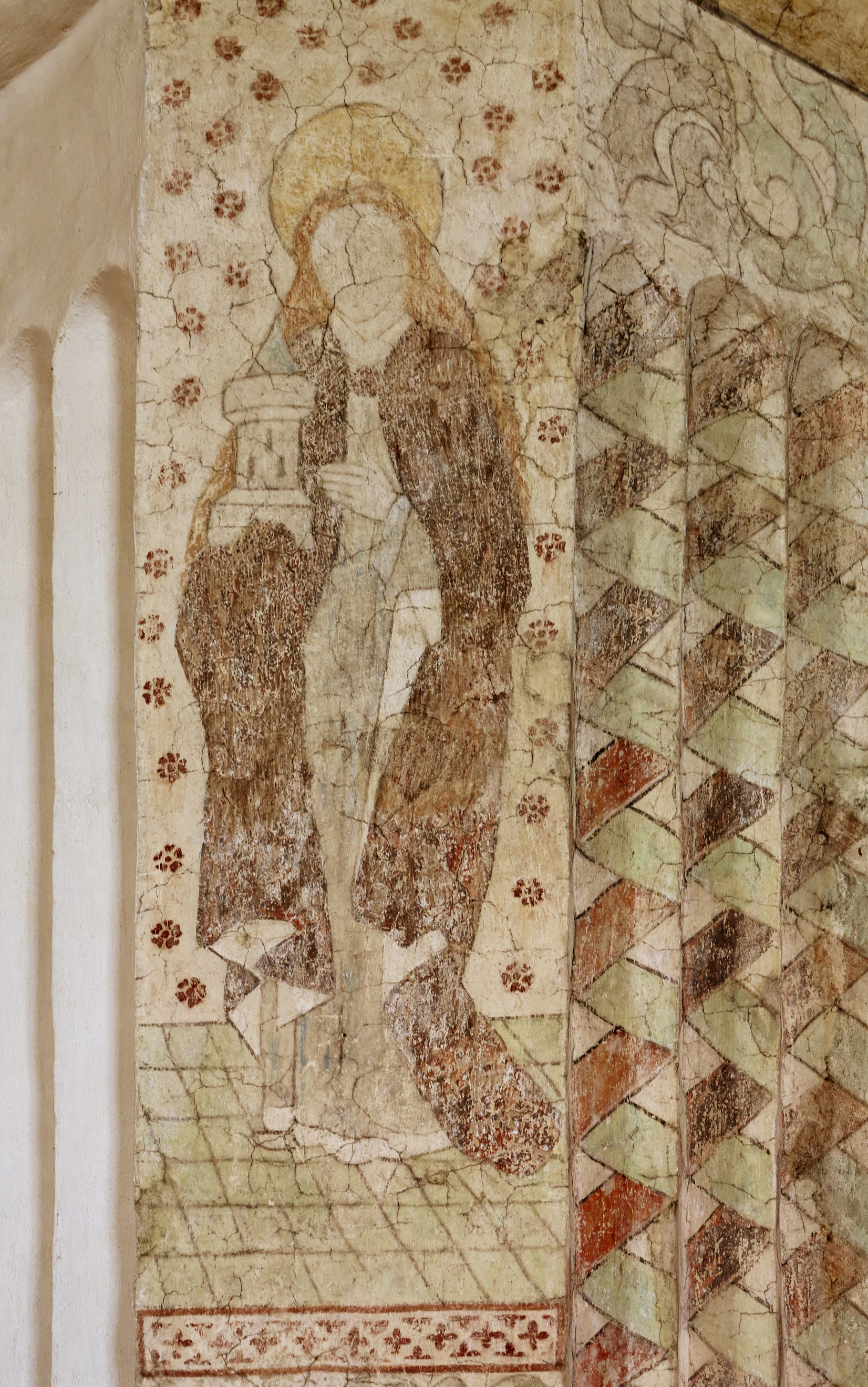
One of the medieval frescos, made by a pupil of Albertus Pictor

The presently visible stone church was probably preceded by a wooden chapel. Construction of the stone church started in the 15th century and continued into the early 16th century. The church was however inaugurated already in 1492, by Jakob Ulvsson, Archbishop of Uppsala. Arrowslits preserved in the church indicate that apart from its religious use, it also served a defensive purpose. The church remained largely unchanged until the 18th century. In 1745 the medieval frescos were painted over, and during the same decade the windows were enlarged. In 1776-78 the church was painted red, externally, a new entrance was made and more windows added. In 1848 the windows were altered, again. Successive changes to the interior, with old furnishings removed and new added, have also been carried out since the 18th century. During a renovation in 1909 the medieval frescos were uncovered again and the choir portal regained its original appearance, which had been altered during the 18th century. Additional renovations have been carried out in 1936, 1954 and 1969–71. The free-standing bell tower dates from 1851 and replaced an earlier, wooden bell tower. The two bells date from 1554 and 1684, but have both been re-cast in later times.

Scenes from television series En hederlig jul med Knyckertz were filmed in the church.

== Architecture ==
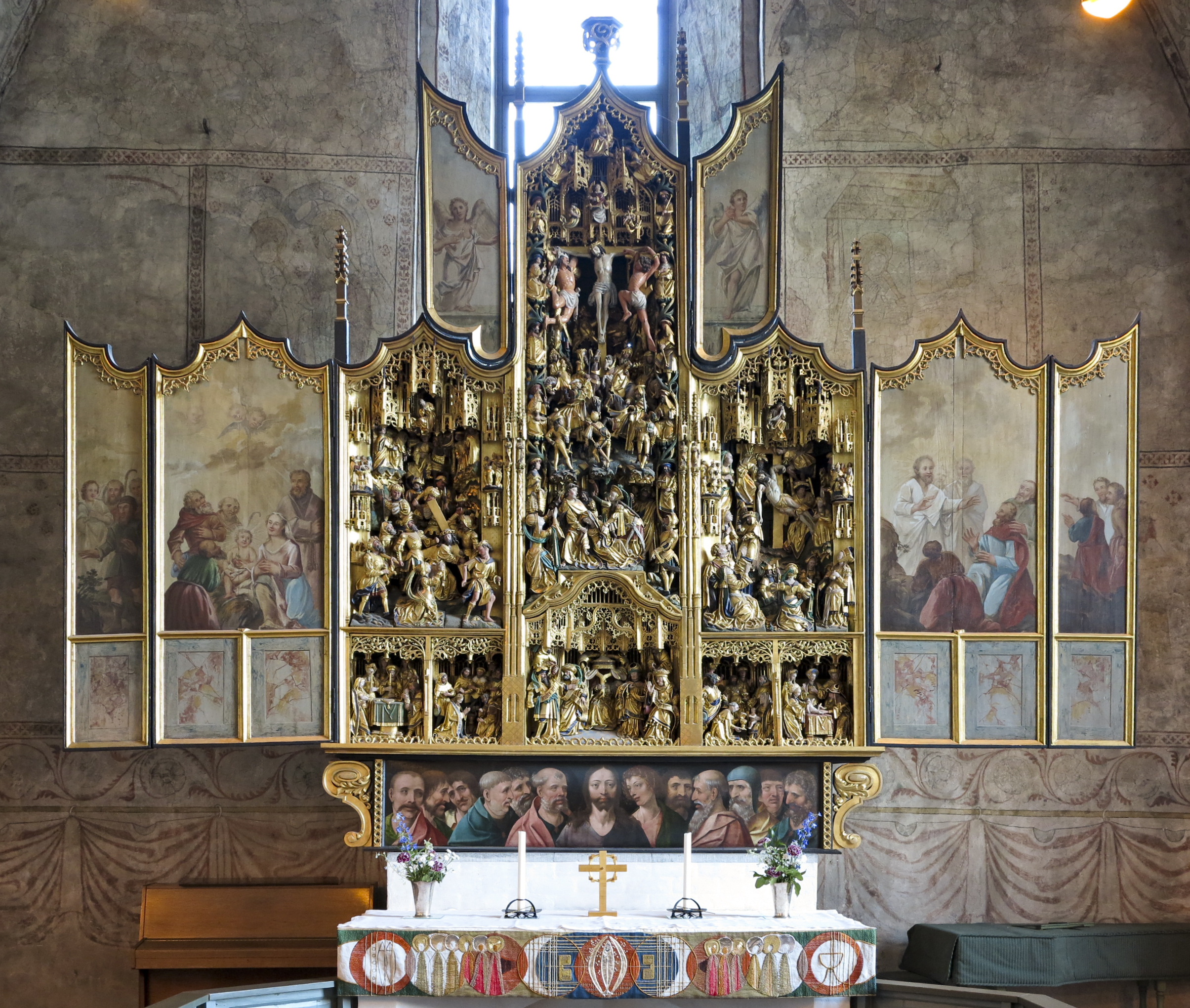
The altarpiece (1520), one of the finest of its kind in Sweden

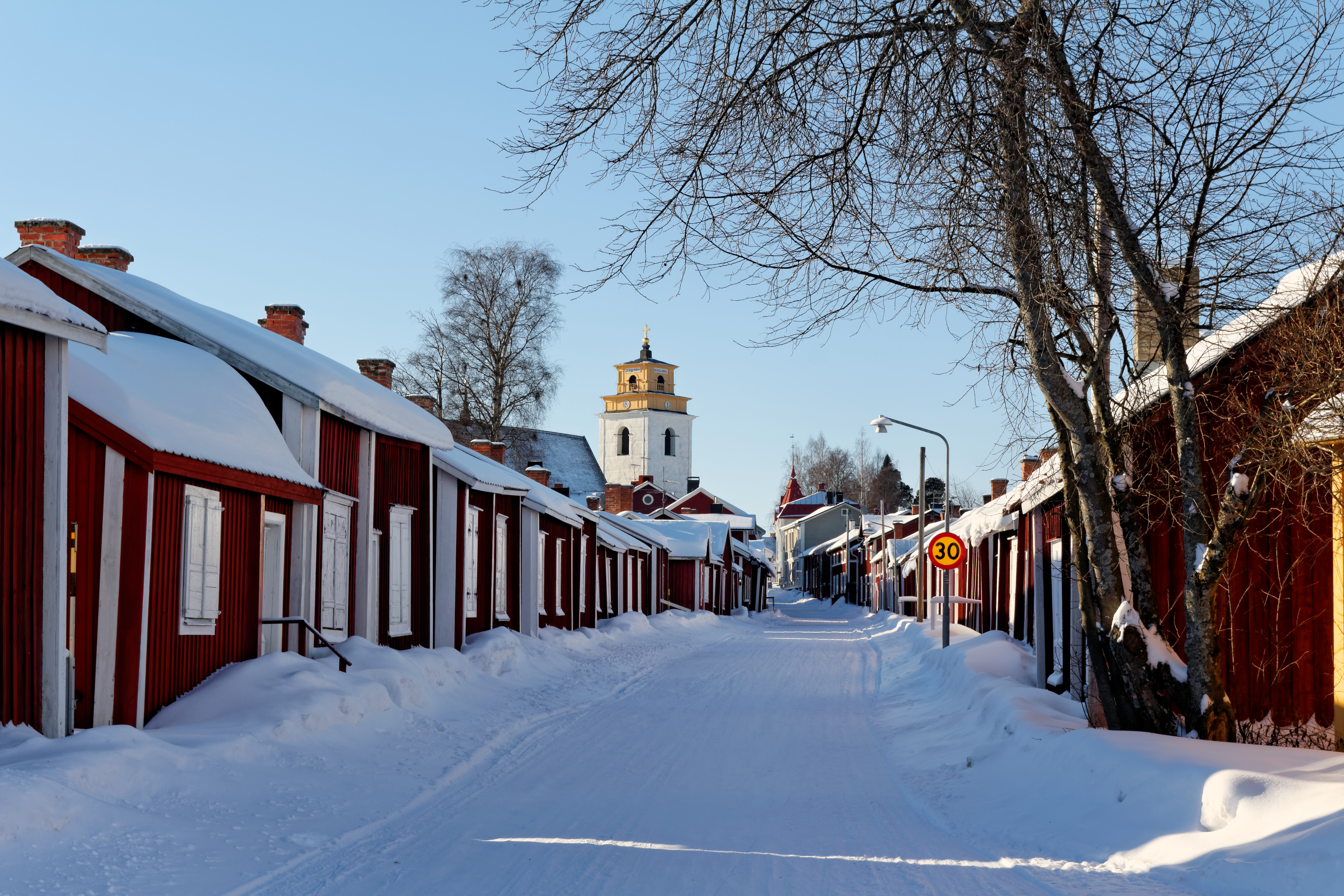
Nederluleå Church in the background as seen from Gammelstad Church Town

The church is built of fieldstone (consisting of about 40 types of rock), with details made of brick. The roof is made of shake, as was the original roof. The church is surrounded by a wall in which two lychgates are preserved.

Inside, the church is a vaulted single-nave church with a choir of the same height as the nave. A sacristy protrudes from the northern façade, and a church porch from the southern. The vaults are decorated with frescos, probably made by a pupil of Albertus Pictor.

Among the church furnishings, the altarpiece is the most noteworthy. It dates from circa 1520 and was made in Antwerp. Its central part contains intricately carved figures depicting the Passion of Christ. The altarpiece is one of the finest of its kind in Sweden. The congregation is supposed to have paid the sum of 900 silver marks, in cash, for the altarpiece – a great sum for the mostly peasant congregation. Among other furnishings, the triumphal cross and the marble baptismal font date from the late Middle Ages. The richly carved pulpit dates from 1712. Some of the pews are medieval, while some were at least elaborated in 1749. The organ dates from 1971.

== See also ==
- Church frescos in Sweden
