= Ersnäs =

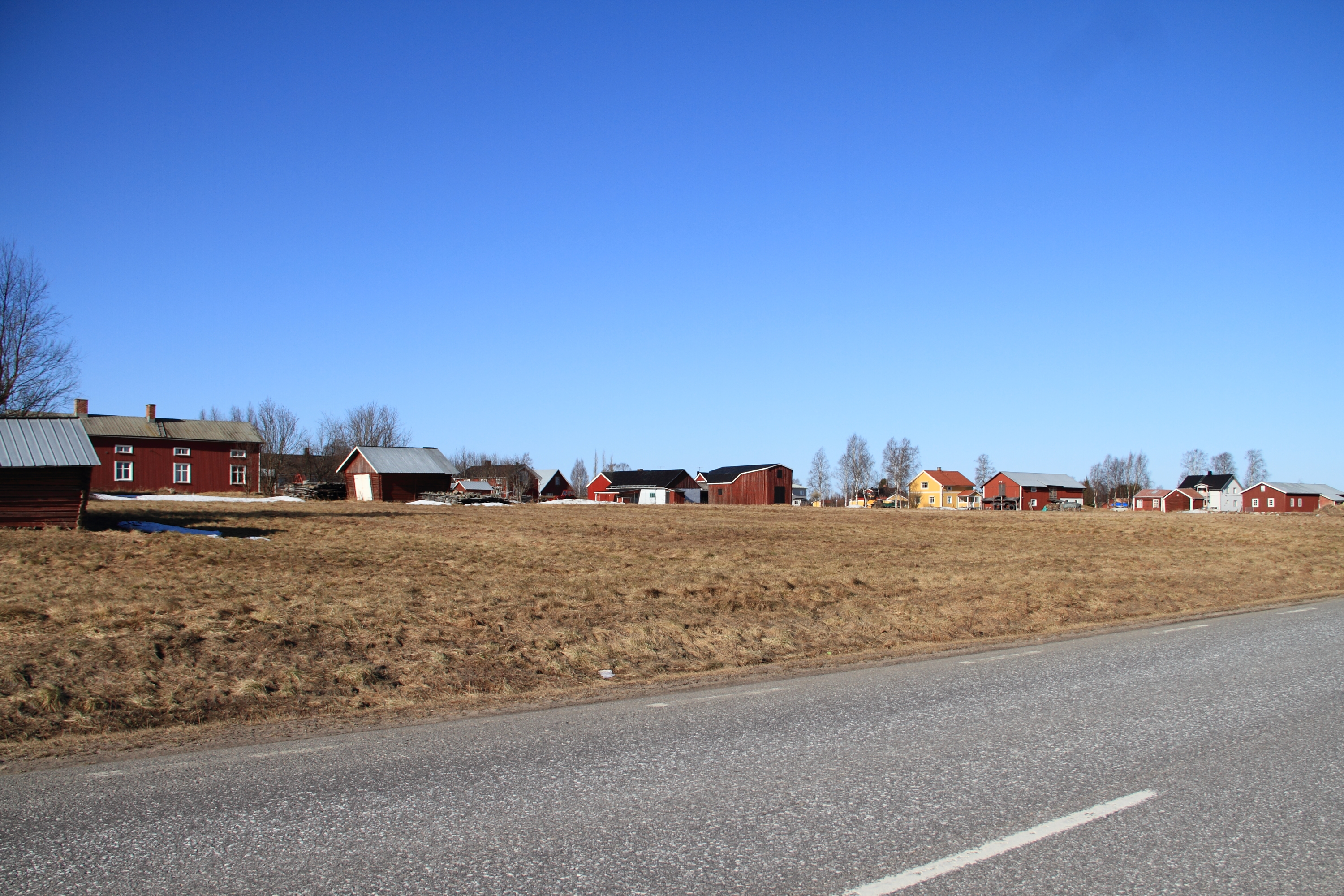
- Buildings in Ersnäs

- Location within Norrbotten Location within Sweden
- Coordinates: 65°32′N 21°48′E
- Country: Sweden
- Province: Norrbotten
- County: Norrbotten County
- Municipality: Luleå Municipality

Area
  - Total: 0.52 km^{2} (0.20 sq mi)

Population (31 December 2010)
  - Total: 292
  - Density: 565/km^{2} (1,460/sq mi)
- Time zone: UTC+1 (CET)
  - Summer (DST): UTC+2 (CEST)

Ersnäs is a locality situated in Luleå Municipality, Norrbotten County, Sweden with 292 inhabitants in 2010. It is home to Ersnäs IF.
