= Kyrkstad =

District of cottages around a church

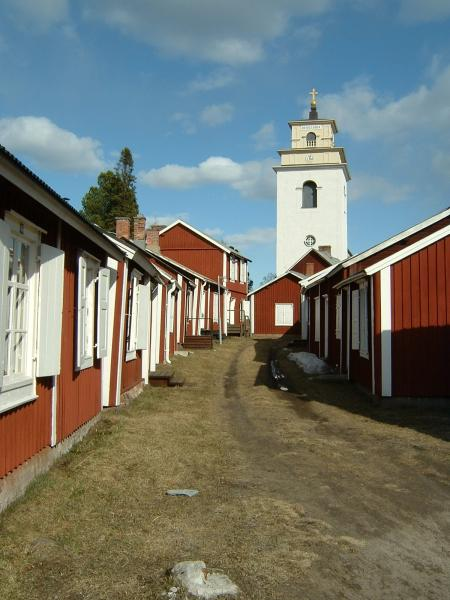
Gammelstad kyrkstad, a World Heritage Site

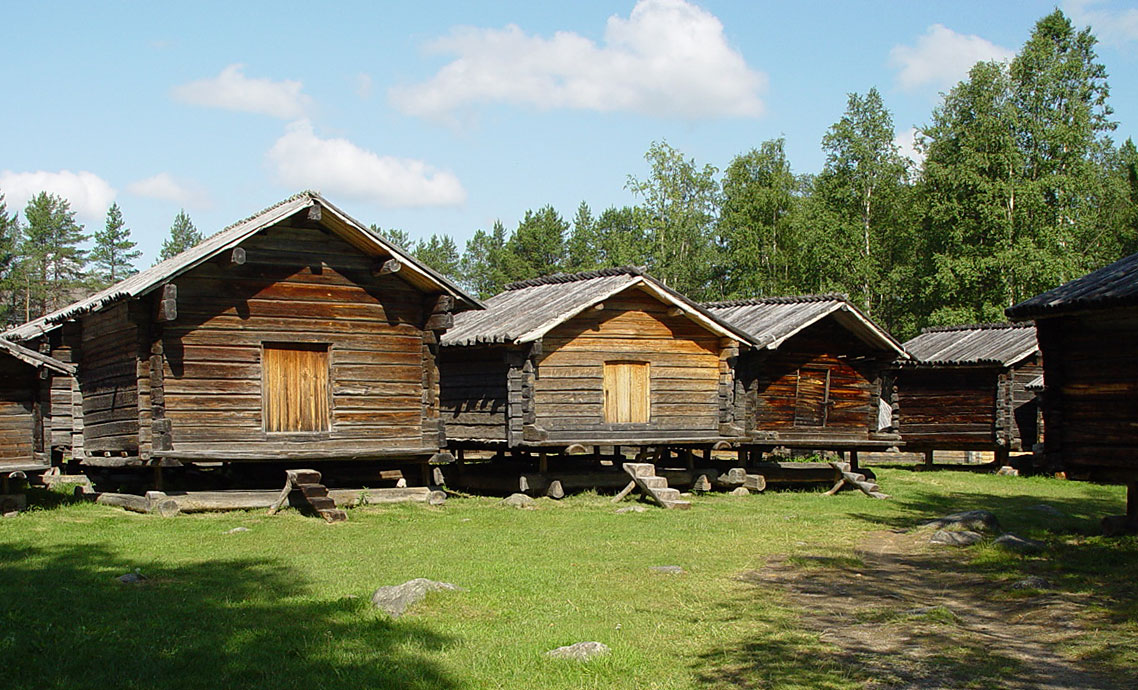
A lappstad in Arvidsjaur

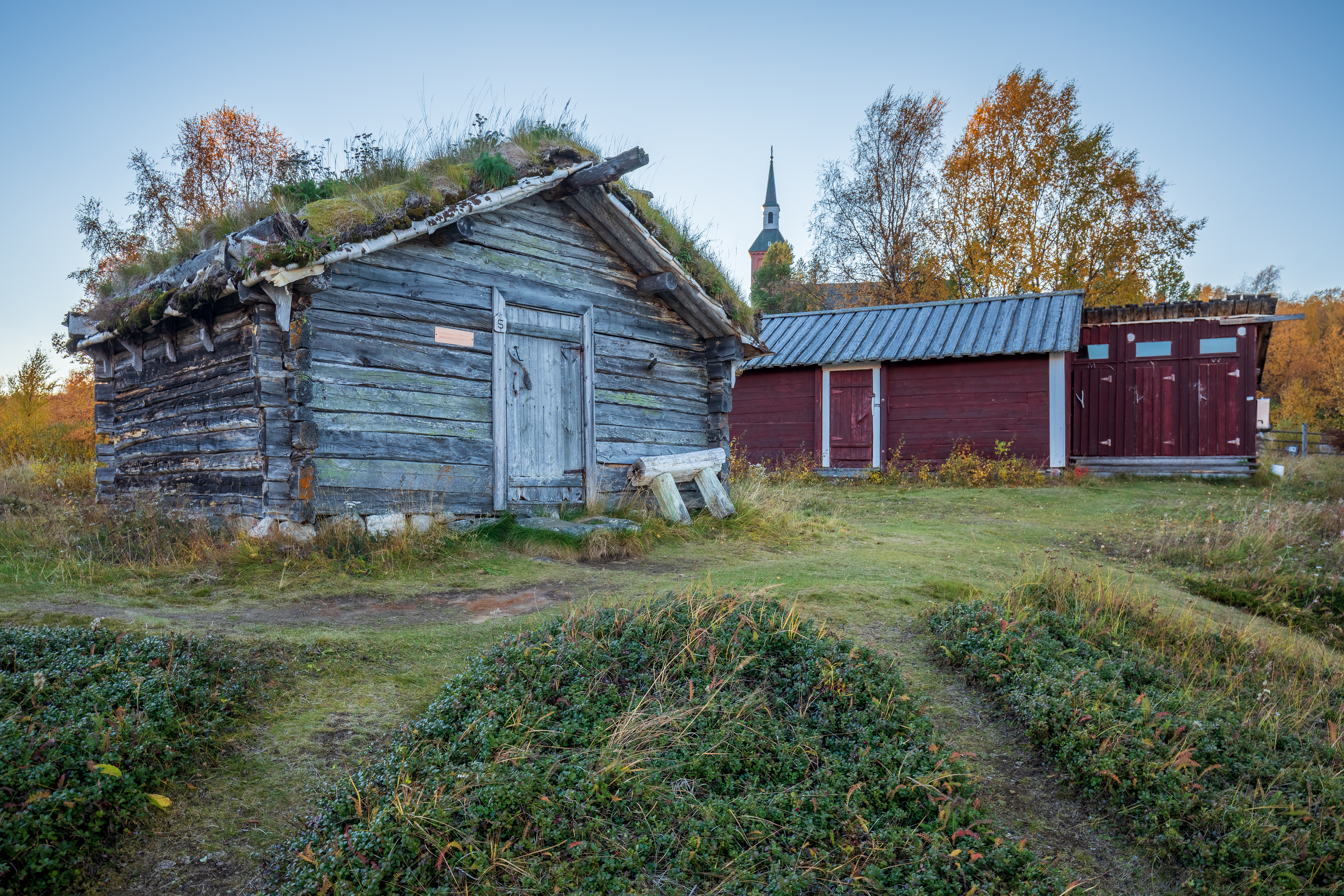
A kirkkokylä in Utsjoki, Finland

Unique to Sweden, a kyrkstad (literally "church town"; in Finnish it is called kirkkokylä, "church village") is a group of cottages, huts and sheds, intended for temporary use in connection with church visits. They have arisen in sparsely populated areas of Sweden, where the areas of parishes were very large. For this reason the churchgoers had to travel large distance and it was difficult to attend church daily. Therefore, many people attended church only on some holidays and stayed overnight or for several days in their own dwellings by church. The land around churches was owned by the state or the church, therefore it was freehold and personal construction was permitted. In addition to the churchgoing purpose, these days were occasions used to carry out various business, tax collecting, socializing, etc.

Kyrkstäder with predominantly Sámi population were called "lappstad", after the old term "Lapp" for Sámi.

Of about seventy kyrkstader, sixteen have been preserved, with many of them designated to be cultural heritage. In particular, Gammelstad Church Town is a UNESCO World Heritage Site.

== See also ==
- Kirchdorf
