= Bergnäset =

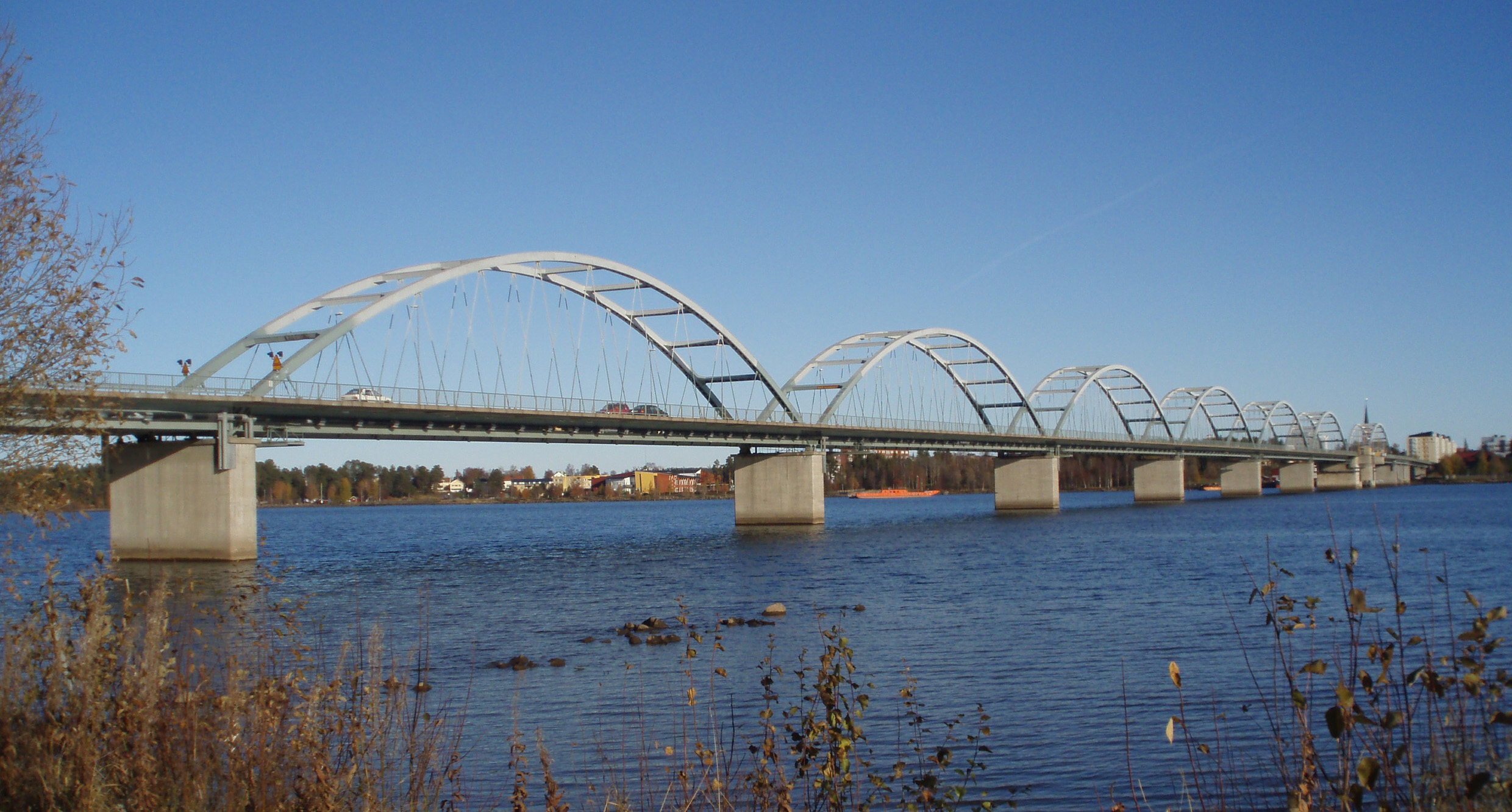
- The Bergnäs Bridge linking Bergnäset with central Luleå

- Location within Norrbotten Location within Sweden
- Coordinates: 65°34′30″N 22°06′15″E
- Country: Sweden
- Province: Norrbotten
- County: Norrbotten County
- Municipality: Luleå Municipality

Area
  - Total: 3.09 km^{2} (1.19 sq mi)

Population (31 December 2010)
  - Total: 3,648
  - Density: 1,179/km^{2} (3,050/sq mi)
- Time zone: UTC+1 (CET)
  - Summer (DST): UTC+2 (CEST)

Bergnäset is a locality situated in Luleå Municipality, Norrbotten County, Sweden with 3,648 inhabitants in 2010.
