= Bälinge, Luleå =

Bälinge
- Location within Norrbotten Location within Sweden
- Coordinates: 65°38′N 21°56′E
- Country: Sweden
- Province: Norrbotten
- County: Norrbotten County
- Municipality: Luleå Municipality

Area
  - Total: 0.47 km^{2} (0.18 sq mi)

Population (31 December 2010)
  - Total: 307
  - Density: 657/km^{2} (1,700/sq mi)
- Time zone: UTC+1 (CET)
  - Summer (DST): UTC+2 (CEST)

Bälinge is a locality situated in Luleå Municipality, Norrbotten County, Sweden with 307 inhabitants in 2010.
