= Gammelstaden =

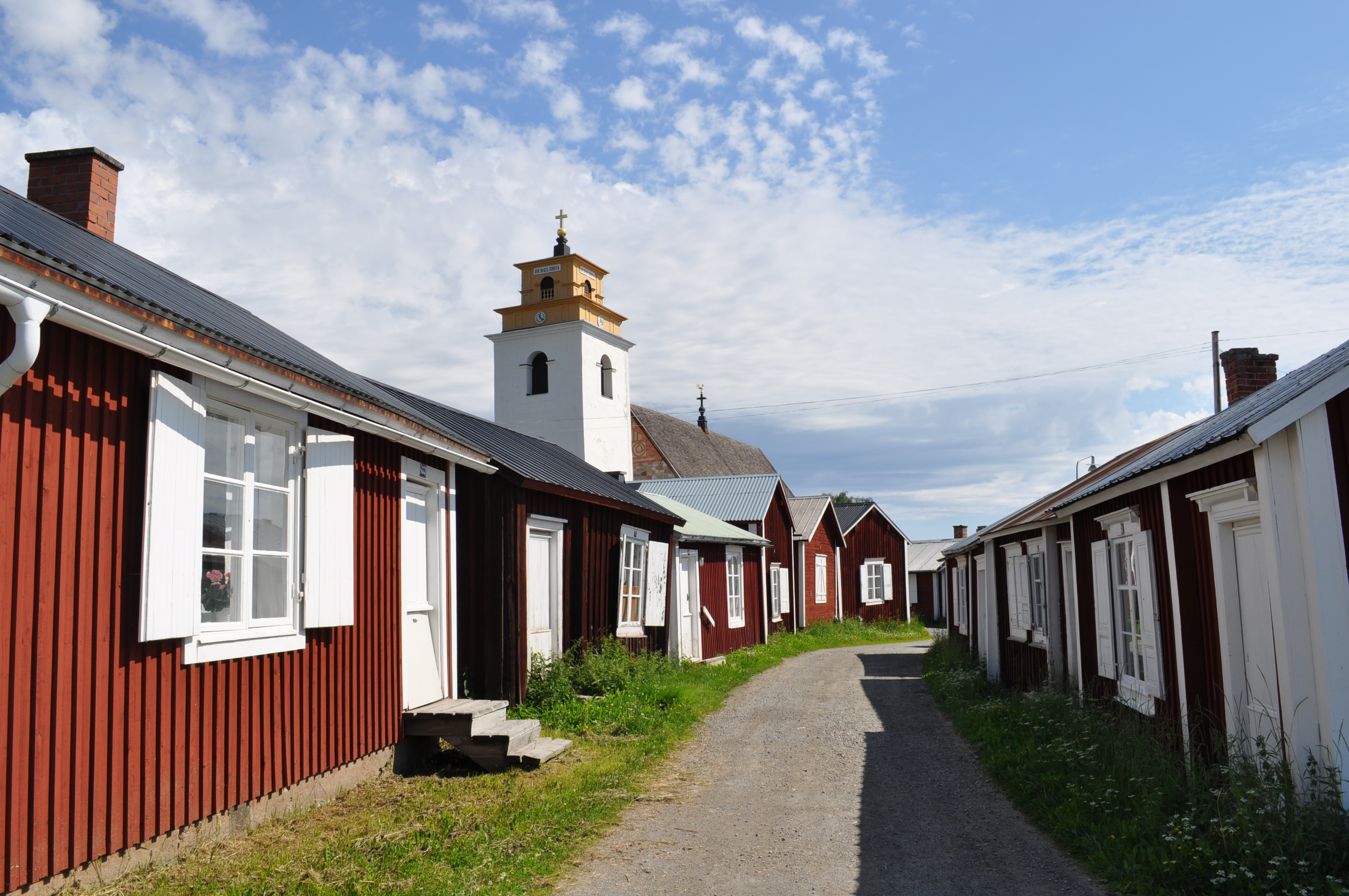
- Gammelstad Church Town

- Location within Norrbotten Location within Sweden
- Coordinates: 65°38′30″N 22°00′50″E
- Country: Sweden
- Province: Norrbotten
- County: Norrbotten County
- Municipality: Luleå Municipality

Area
  - Total: 6.20 km^{2} (2.39 sq mi)

Population (31 December 2010)
  - Total: 4,960
  - Density: 800/km^{2} (2,100/sq mi)
- Time zone: UTC+1 (CET)
  - Summer (DST): UTC+2 (CEST)

Gammelstaden or Gammelstad (Luleå Old Town) is a locality situated in Luleå Municipality, Norrbotten County, Sweden with 4,960 inhabitants in 2010. It is known for the Gammelstad Church Town, a UNESCO World Heritage Site.

== History ==
A thousand years ago Luleå district consisted of an archipelago: the land was ten metres lower than today, pushed down by the weight of ice in the last ice age. The church hill of present-day Gammelstad was a small island at the mouth of the Lule river. During the 14th century the area became the centre of a parish stretching from the coast to the Norwegian mountains along the Kalix, Lule and Råne rivers.

After the Treaty of Nöteborg in 1323, Sweden and Russia disagreed about their northern border. To secure the area the Swedish state entrusted the Lule river valley to burghers from Central Sweden. The church sent out priests and built simple wooden churches, and 1339 was the first year church services were mentioned as having been held in 'Luleå'. Church, taxation and Swedish legislation were used to incorporate what is today Norrbotten into the Swedish state.

The building of Nederluleå Church commenced during the fifteenth century. This is a large building, reflecting the economic prosperity of the area, presumably based on trading fur and salmon. In the seventeenth century the rule was applied more strictly that all trade should be centred on the towns where it could be taxed, and in 1621 the town of Luleå was founded on the site of the old marketplace. It was noted as early as 1649 that the harbour had become too shallow owing to the land elevation.

The burghers of Luleå were forced to move their town nearer the coast. This led to the establishment of Luleå New Town and Luleå Old Town, present-day Luleå and Gammelstad, respectively. To the north-east of Gammelstad church, a few blocks with courtyards laid out at right-angles still remain, which have their roots in the 17th century.

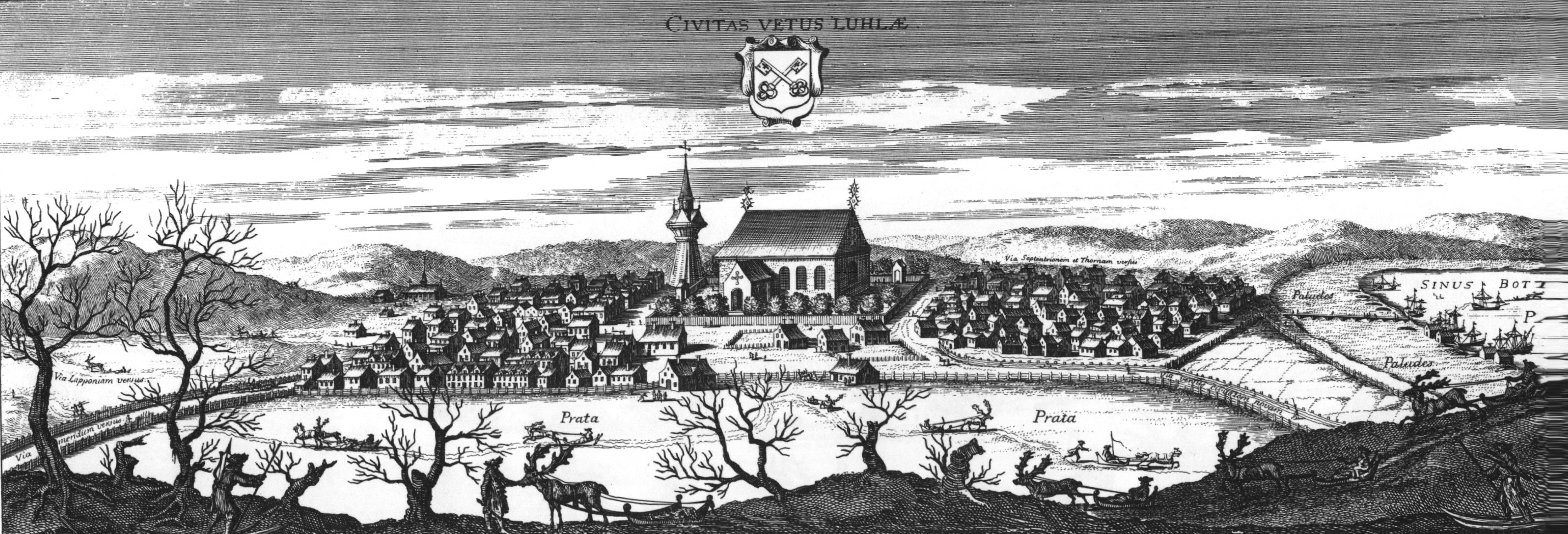
An engraving of Luleå Old Town c. 1700 from Suecia antiqua et hodierna.
