= Gammelstad Church Town =

Church Town of Gammelstad, Luleå
UNESCO World Heritage Site
- Gammelstad Church Town

- Location within Norrbotten Location within Sweden
- Location: Gammelstaden, Luleå Municipality, Norrbotten County, Sweden
- Criteria: Cultural: (ii), (iv), (v)
- Reference: 762
- Inscription: 1996 (20th Session)
- Area: 16.402 ha (40.53 acres)
- Buffer zone: 243.474 ha (601.64 acres)
- Website: www.lulea.se/gammelstad
- Coordinates: 65°38′46″N 22°01′43″E

Gammelstad Church Town (Swedish: Gammelstads kyrkstad) is a UNESCO World Heritage Site situated in Gammelstaden 10 km north of Luleå, Sweden, at the northern end of the Gulf of Bothnia. It is the best preserved example of a type of settlement called kyrkstad ("church town") that was once widespread throughout northern Scandinavia. As Church Village of Gammelstad, Luleå, it was listed as a World Heritage Site in 1996.

The town is located about 10 kilometers upstream the Lule River. At its centre is the 15th-century Nederluleå Church surrounded by 424 wood-built houses. The houses were only used on Sundays and during religious festivals to accommodate worshipers from the surrounding countryside who could not return home the same day due to the long distance and difficult traveling conditions.

Because the buildings are built from timber, regular maintenance is required to prevent rot; surveys have been carried out to document the extent of existing rotting, and snow is cleared regularly during the winter.

== History ==
The Gammelstad Church Town began as a trading settlement, and became the focus of religious observances for farming communities in the region. Gammelstad is an exceptionally well preserved example of a Scandinavian church town. Such settlements are unique, because they were shaped by the religious and social needs of a regions inhabitants, rather than by economic and geographic forces.

The numerous wooden houses constructed around the church were only used on Sundays, and in conjunction with religious festivals as overnight housing for worshippers from the surrounding countryside, whose journeys involved travelling long distances in a harsh natural environment. Gammelstad's development into a church town instead of a mercantile town is a direct result of natural land upheaval which rendered the town harbor unusable by the 17th century, forcing citizens to relocate the community's commercial centre. The new settlement took the name of Luleå, while the earlier church site was renamed Gammelstad (Old Town). The relocation of the commercial centre preserved the unique settlement of Gammelstad, leaving it untouched by the later 19th-century industrialization of the region.

Gammelstad's layout has been preserved in its entirety. The town plan grew organically over several centuries, consisting of radial approaches to the church, and roads circling the town centre along the sides of the hill. A wall with gates was built around the church, however the wall currently in place is a reconstruction. Development halted after the middle of the 17th century. In the modern day, very few Scandinavian church town settlements remain, and Gammelstad is the best preserved example of this form of settlement, and is therefore protected by UNESCO.

== Buildings ==
There are a total of 520 buildings within the Gammelstad Church Town UNESCO World Heritage Site. These buildings include 404 church cottages divided into about 552 separate chambers, and 116 other buildings. Church cottages which served as short-term housing for worshippers are juxtaposed with larger, more conventional houses for the officials and merchants who lived permanently in the settlement. Both types of housing surround the late 15th-century church, the district's only stone building, whose size reflects the prosperity of the region. Other notable buildings include the Chapel of Bethel, the Cottage of the Separatists, the Parish House, the Tithe Barn, the Mayor's Residence, the Captain's Residence, and the Guest House.

== Gallery ==
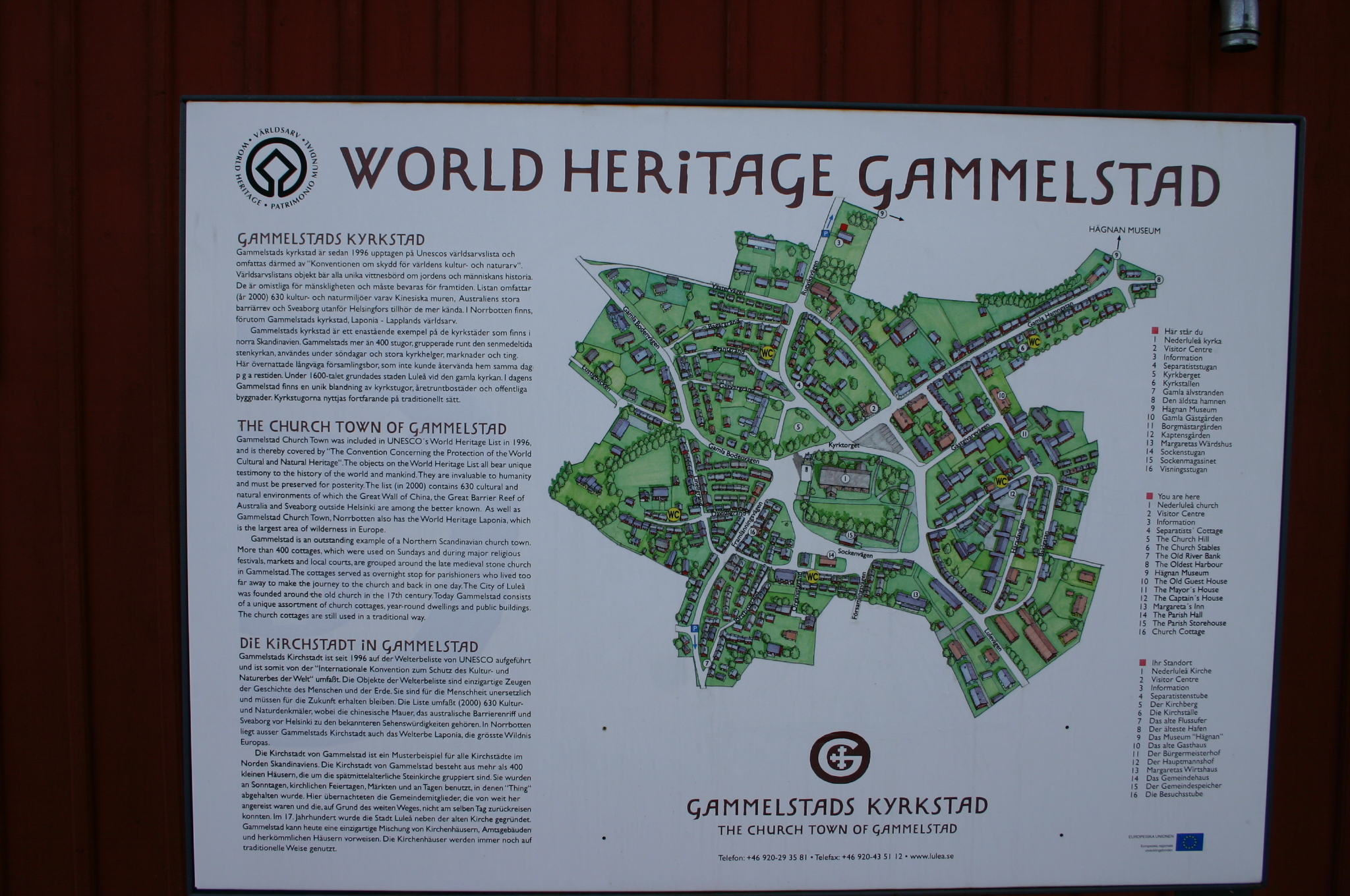
Gammelstad town map hoarding at the entrance

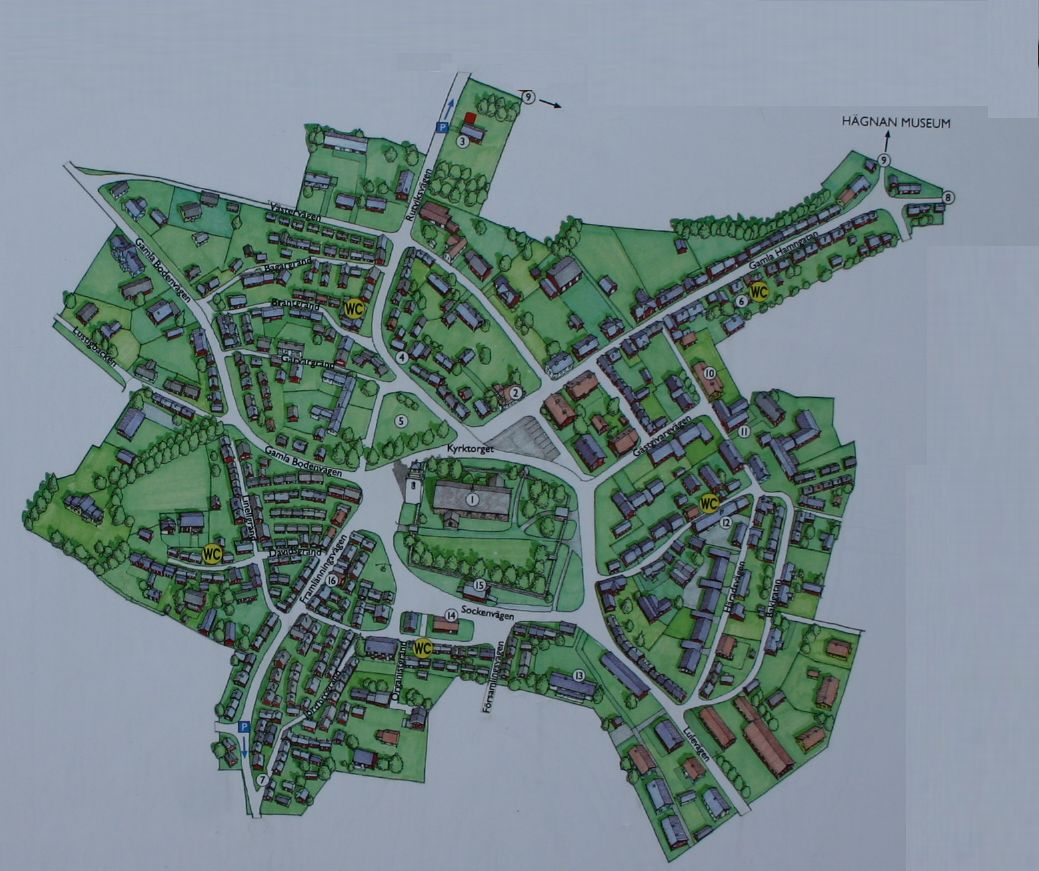
Gammelstad town map

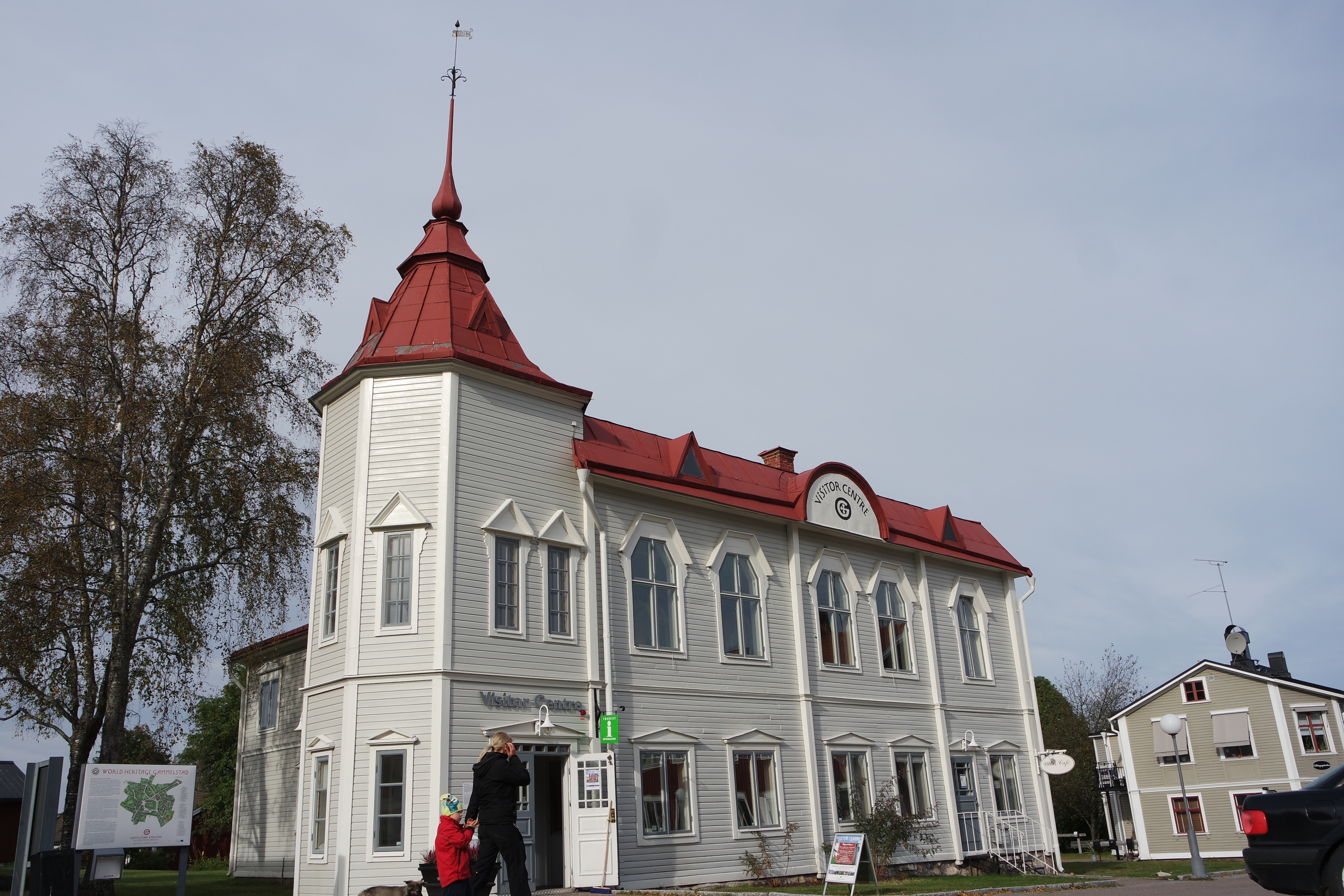
Gammelstad Visitor Center

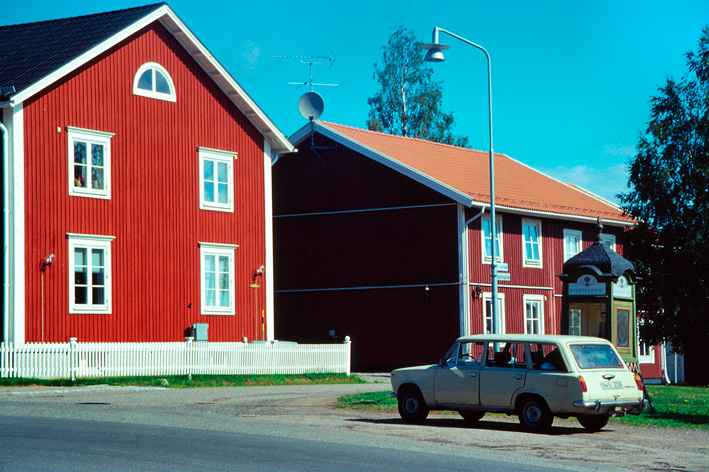
World Heritage Site Gammelstad near Luleå

Gammelstad church town near Lulea

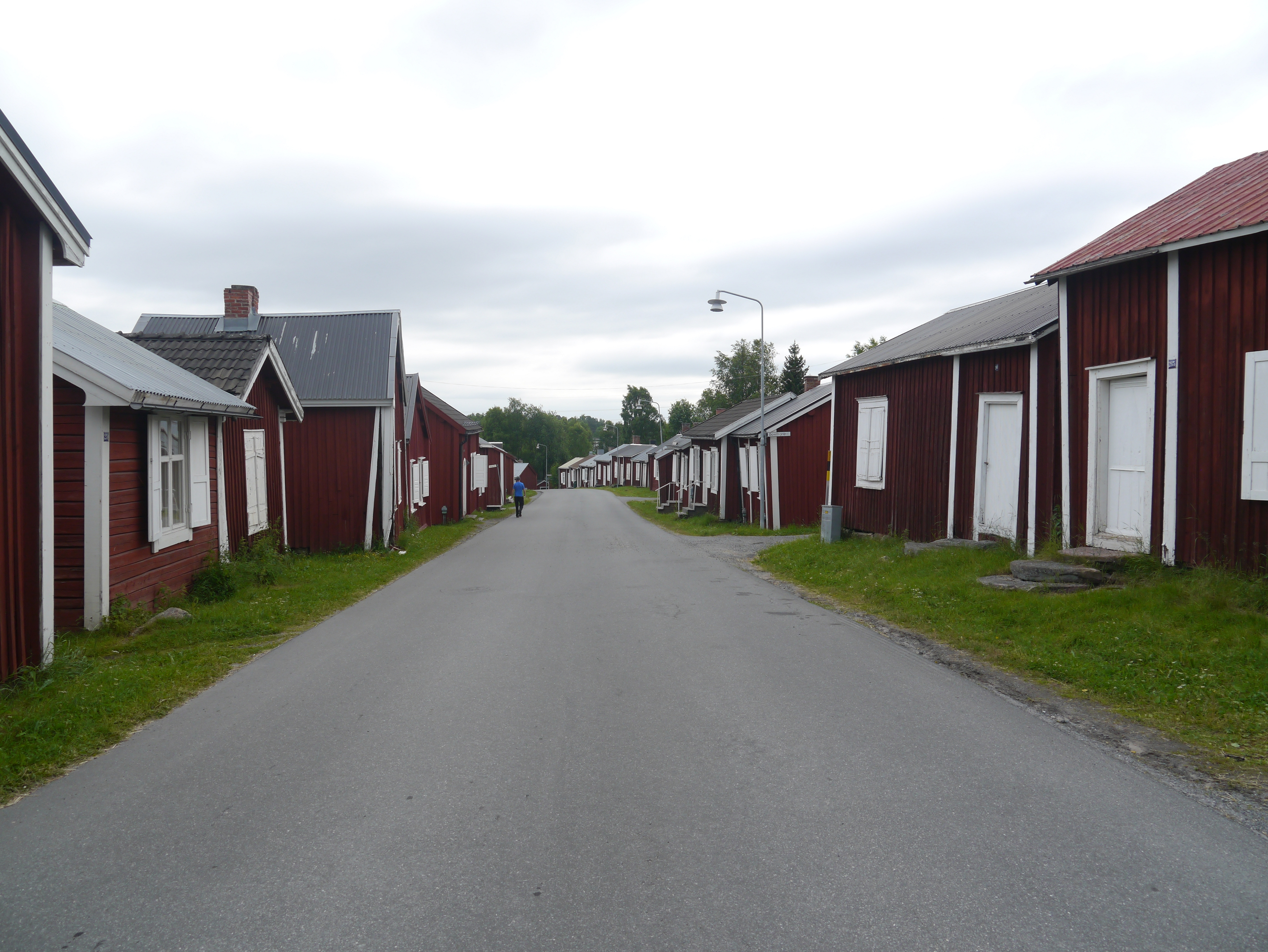

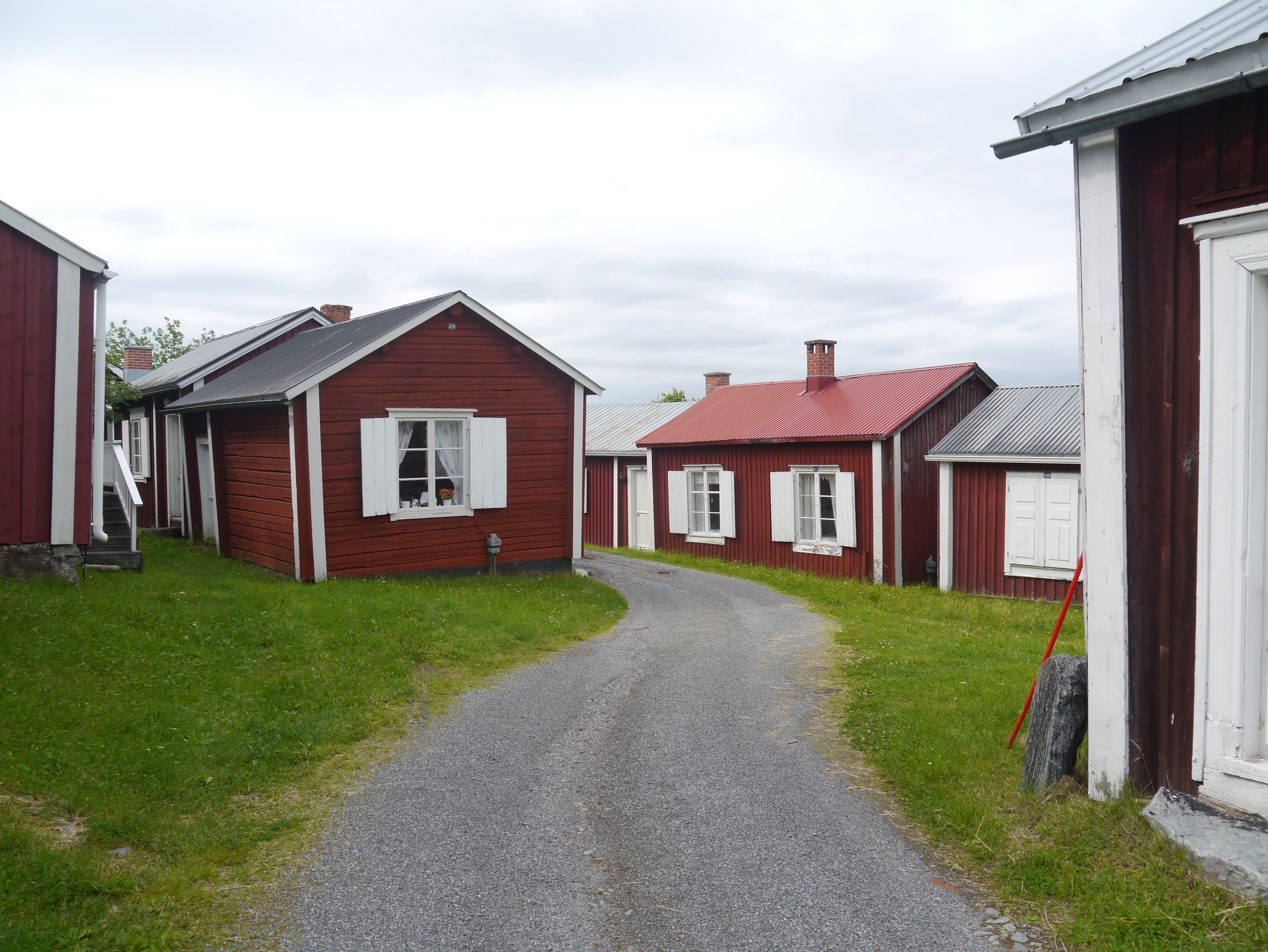

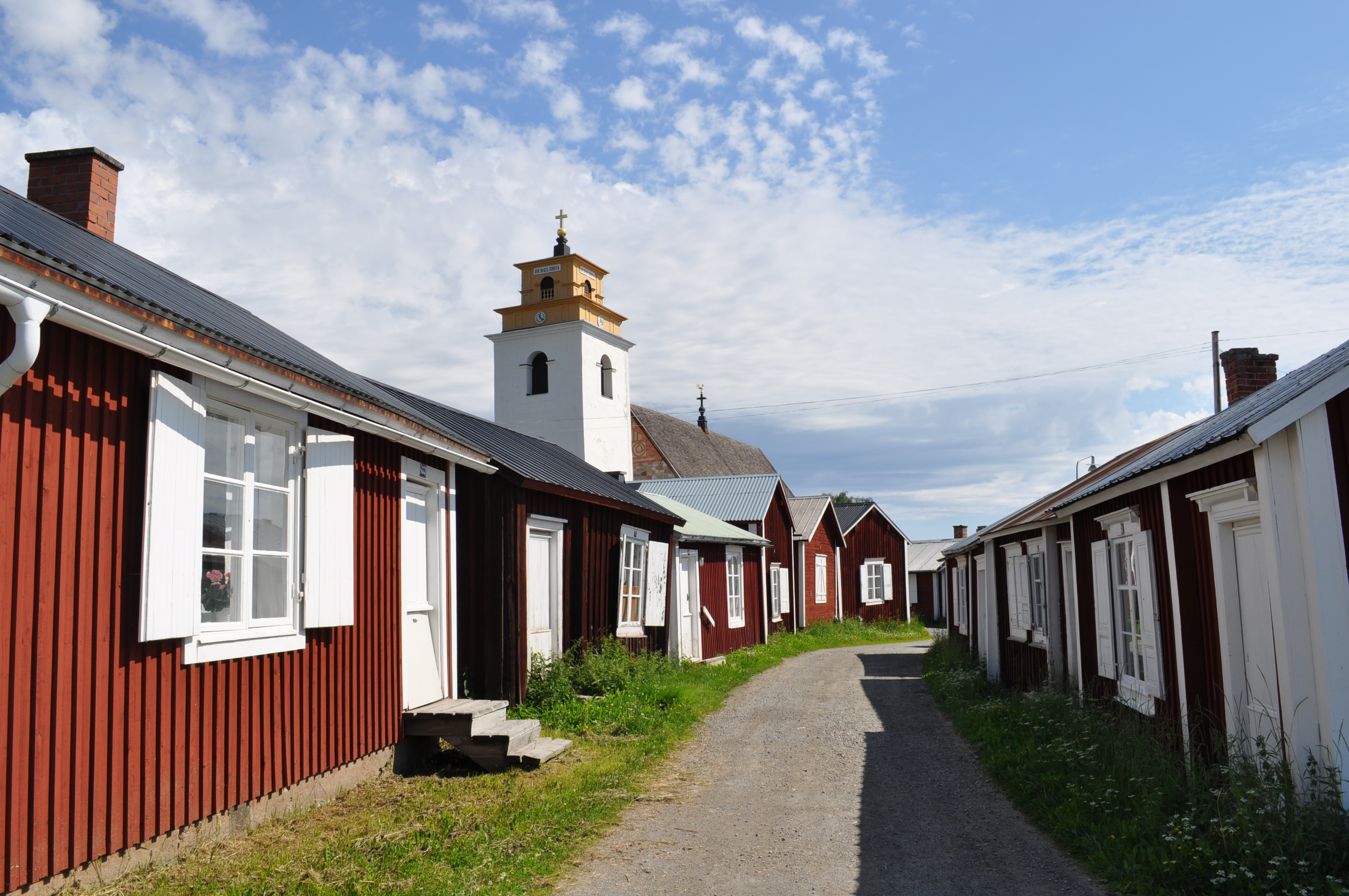
