= Luleå Municipality =

Luleå Municipality Luleå kommun
- Municipality
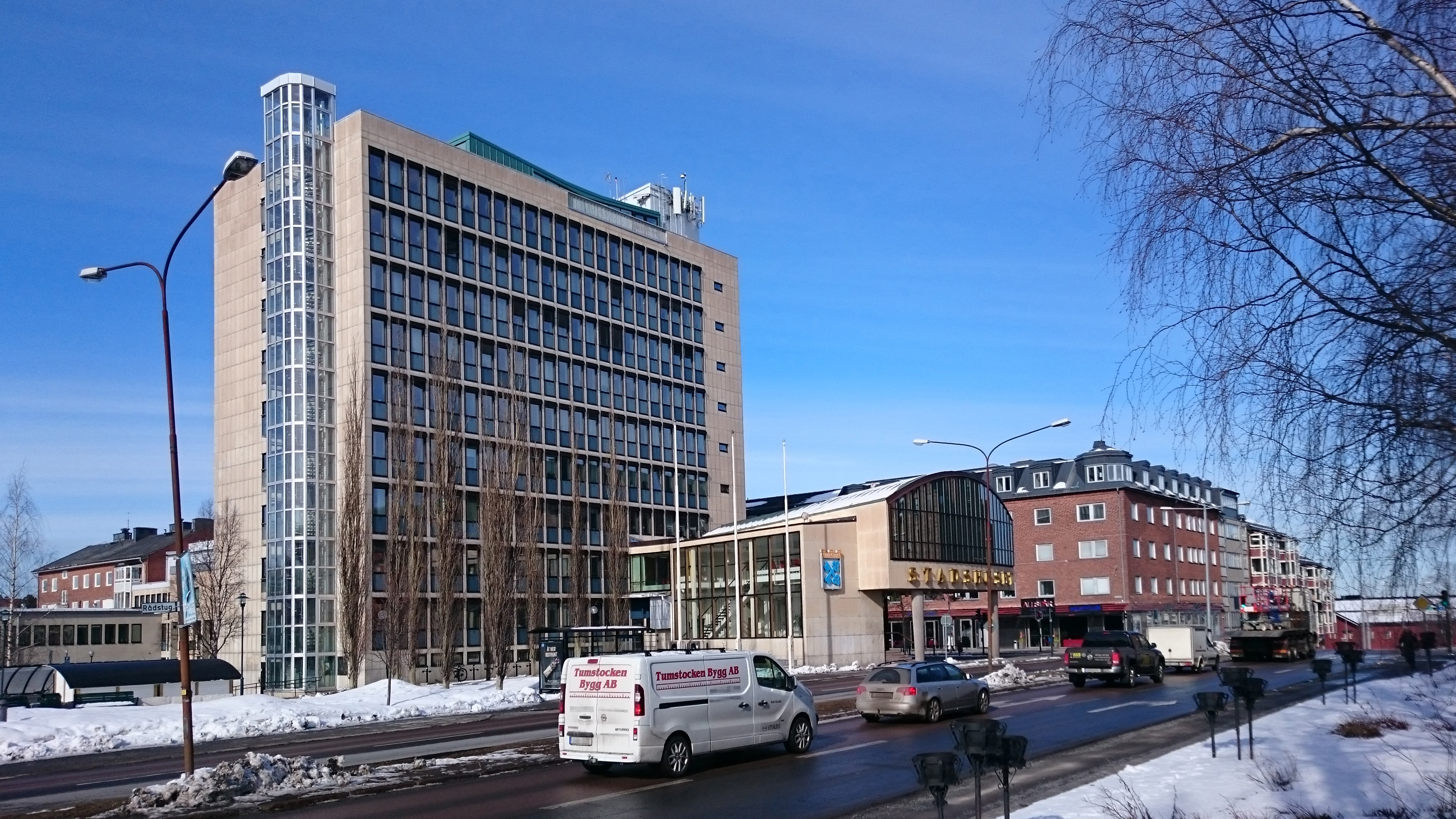
- Luleå town hall

- Coat of arms

- Coordinates: 65°35′N 22°09′E
- Country: Sweden
- County: Norrbotten County
- Seat: Luleå

Area
  - Total: 4,953.75 km^{2} (1,912.65 sq mi)
  - Land: 2,094.18 km^{2} (808.57 sq mi)
  - Water: 2,859.57 km^{2} (1,104.09 sq mi)
- Area as of 1 January 2014.

Population (30 June 2025)
  - Total: 79,690
  - Density: 38.05/km^{2} (98.56/sq mi)
- Time zone: UTC+1 (CET)
  - Summer (DST): UTC+2 (CEST)
- ISO 3166 code: SE
- Province: Norrbotten
- Municipal code: 2580
- Website: lulea.se

Luleå Municipality (Swedish: Luleå kommun (Note: Finnish: Luulajan kunta; Meänkieli: Luulajan kunta; Northern Sami: Julevu gielda)) is a municipality in Norrbotten County in northern Sweden. Its seat is located in Luleå, which is also the county seat of Norrbotten County.

== Localities ==
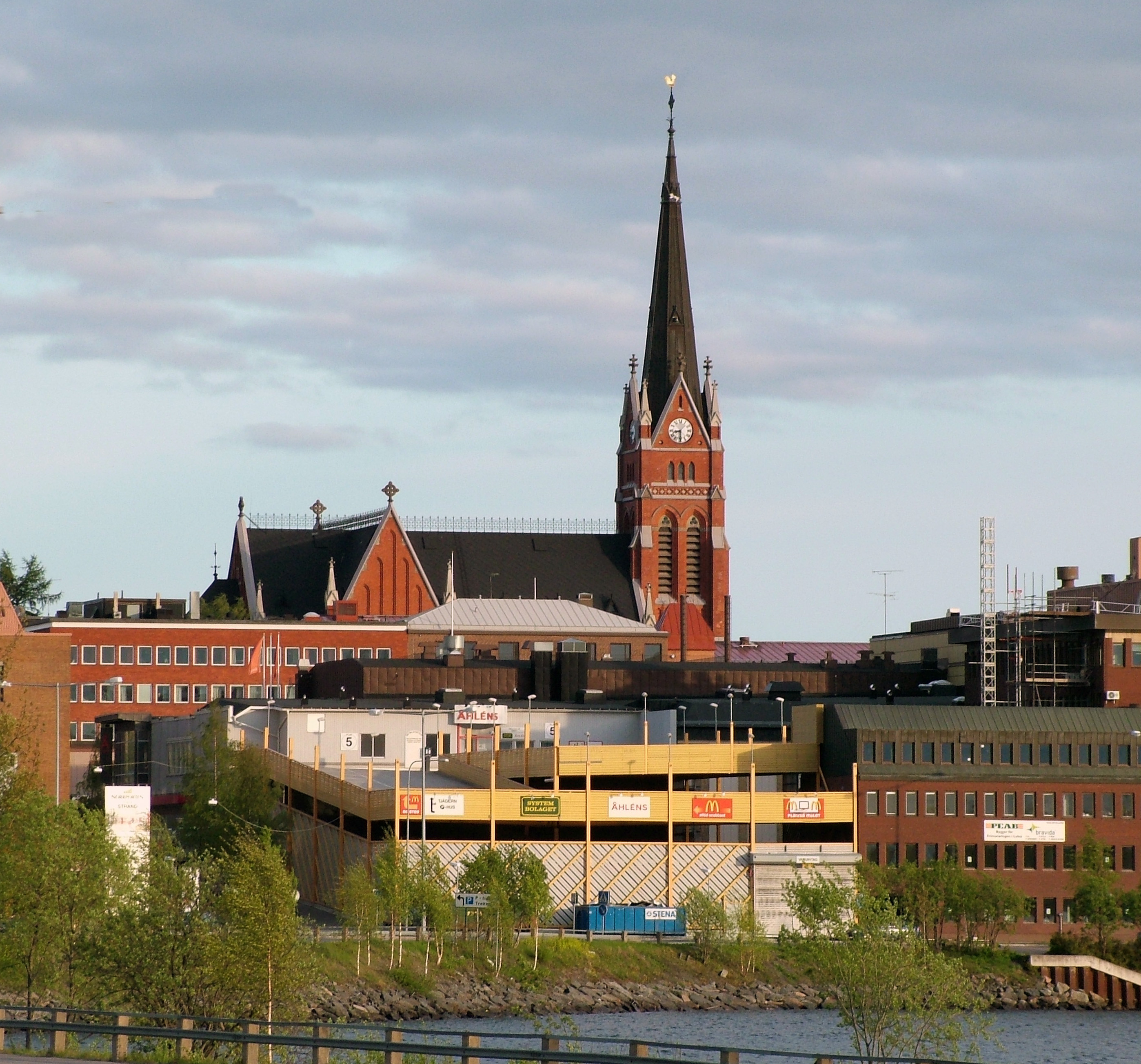
Luleå

There are 18 localities (or urban areas) in Luleå Municipality:

#	Locality	Population
1	**Luleå**	45,467
2	Gammelstaden	4,892
3	Bergnäset	3,674
4	Södra Sunderbyn	2,875
5	Råneå	2,030
6	Antnäs	845
7	Alvik	771
8	Rutvik	759
9	Måttsund	587
10	Bensbyn	434
11	Bälinge	317
12	Ersnäs	299
13	Kallax	291
14	Karlsvik	270
15	Klöverträsk	260
16	Jämtön	236
17	Brändön	233
18	Persön	226

The municipal seat in bold

== Demographics ==
This is a demographic table based on Luleå Municipality's electoral districts in the 2022 Swedish general election sourced from SVT's election platform, in turn taken from SCB official statistics.

In total there were 78,846 residents, including 61,094 Swedish citizens of voting age. 56.9% voted for the left coalition and 42.0% for the right coalition. Indicators are in percentage points except population totals and income.

Location	Residents	Citizen adults	Left vote	Right vote	Employed	Swedish parents	Foreign heritage	Income SEK	Degree
Location			%	%					
Alvik-Ersnäs	2,070	1,526	53.3	45.4	88	93	7	28,510	41
Antnäs-Måttsund	1,878	1,386	52.1	46.7	90	94	6	30,628	50
Avan-Bälinge	1,509	1,178	49.5	49.4	89	94	6	28,165	41
Bensbyn-Brändön	1,931	1,437	47.1	52.1	90	94	6	31,492	51
Bergstaden	1,587	1,126	60.4	38.3	76	75	25	23,619	37
Bergviken	1,138	986	61.6	37.9	79	89	11	25,419	58
Björkskatan N	2,015	1,490	62.4	36.7	82	87	13	28,697	59
Björkskatan S	1,402	1,081	60.5	38.9	83	86	14	27,664	60
Bredviken-Lerbäcken	1,973	1,430	59.4	40.2	88	90	10	31,125	56
Burströmska	1,480	1,232	64.5	34.6	83	90	10	27,798	52
G:a Bergnäset-Kallax	1,419	1,125	51.7	48.2	83	93	7	31,108	48
Gammelstad	1,399	1,076	62.9	36.5	86	94	6	30,712	59
Gültsauudden-N Hamn	1,201	1,024	59.2	40.2	78	88	12	27,389	50
Hammaren	1,883	1,355	60.8	38.8	89	92	8	33,384	59
Hertsöcentrum	1,931	1,377	66.3	32.7	76	73	27	23,614	31
Hertsölund	1,761	1,207	61.3	36.9	76	75	25	24,017	34
Hertsöängar	2,040	1,505	54.6	44.5	78	77	23	24,582	32
Hällbacken	1,174	711	48.4	51.1	93	91	9	33,673	67
Jämtön-Vitå	865	701	55.2	44.3	88	94	6	24,743	32
Kallkällan	1,616	1,300	60.8	37.7	79	83	17	25,042	40
Klintbacken	1,106	874	58.4	40.8	62	83	17	21,152	58
Kronan	2,172	1,776	55.8	43.6	88	87	13	33,787	66
Kulturens hus	1,518	1,358	55.0	43.7	82	90	10	28,171	49
Köpmantorget	1,391	1,239	59.3	40.4	83	88	12	26,851	47
Lillporsön	1,538	1,152	55.6	41.5	54	66	34	8,942	65
Lulsundet	1,762	1,277	61.7	37.4	76	86	14	28,921	66
Malmudden	1,013	966	63.0	35.9	75	82	18	23,664	41
Mjölkudden	1,639	1,304	63.4	35.6	81	86	14	26,723	49
Munkeberg	2,039	1,621	56.8	42.0	82	85	15	26,898	54
Niemisel-Prästholm	966	797	42.9	55.1	86	92	8	23,236	24
Norra Örnäset	1,481	1,217	63.9	34.4	78	77	23	22,947	39
Notviken	2,600	1,728	56.3	42.2	76	70	30	25,128	40
Persön	1,723	1,323	42.0	55.4	86	93	7	28,480	38
Porsöberget	1,261	918	59.4	39.0	87	82	18	31,210	65
Porsöudden	1,193	818	60.4	37.5	66	68	32	20,028	44
Rutvik	1,263	866	51.9	47.5	90	94	6	31,617	49
Råneå	2,152	1,708	48.9	50.2	81	86	14	23,282	29
Skurholmen	1,900	1,485	61.3	37.5	82	86	14	26,384	45
Stadsparken	1,639	1,487	58.1	41.1	81	87	13	26,478	53
Stadsön	2,324	1,794	59.6	39.1	81	86	14	25,782	45
Sunderbyn	1,601	1,104	55.5	42.7	88	92	8	32,837	57
Svartöstan-Lövskatan	1,584	1,283	59.9	39.3	84	89	11	27,583	45
Södra hamn	1,738	1,583	58.4	41.4	84	90	10	28,349	52
Södra Örnäset	1,467	1,184	60.6	37.6	73	73	27	22,653	28
Trollstaden	1,662	1,211	53.8	45.8	91	94	6	34,703	66
Universitetet	1,856	1,485	42.8	54.1	26	70	30	4,126	79
Varvet	1,248	1,120	55.6	44.1	81	88	12	25,886	50
Öhemmanet-Karlsvik	1,451	1,083	60.7	38.4	85	91	9	30,674	52
Östermalm	1,287	1,080	63.2	35.6	82	88	12	26,536	54
Source: SVT

== Twin towns and sister cities ==
Luleå is twinned: with

- Kemi, Finland
- Puerto Cabezas, Nicaragua
- Santa Lucía de Tirajana, Spain
- Tromsø, Norway
- Zenica, Bosnia and Herzegovina

== See also ==
- Hertsön (district)
- List of islands of the Luleå archipelago
