= Norrbotten =

Historical province of Sweden

Coordinates: 67°00′N 20°00′E

- Historical province
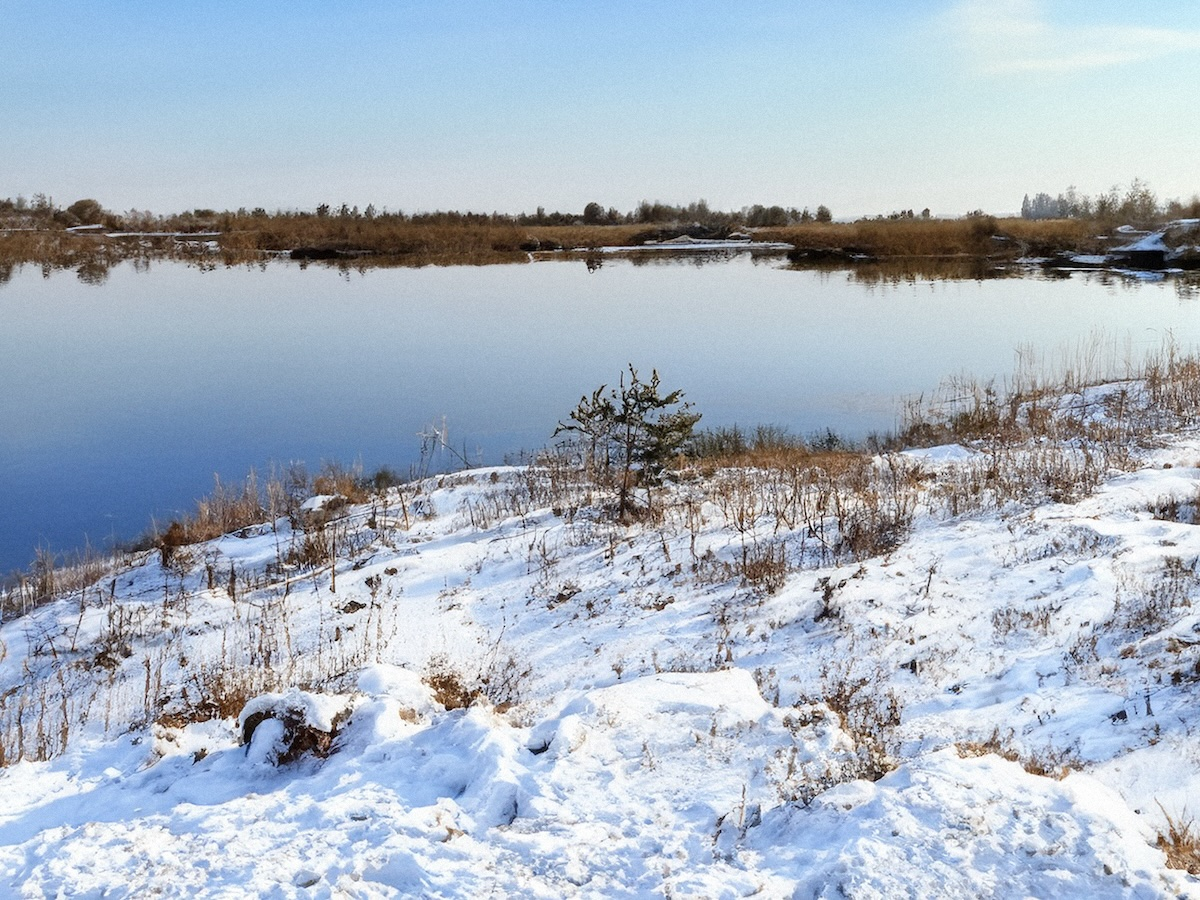

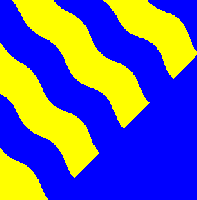
- Flag Coat of arms

- Country: Sweden
- Land: Norrland
- County: Norrbotten

Area
  - Land: 26,671 km^{2} (10,298 sq mi)

Population (31 December 2023)
  - Total: 195,267
  - Density: 7.3213/km^{2} (18.962/sq mi)

Ethnicity
  - Language: Swedish

Culture
  - Flower: Arctic raspberry
  - Animal: Siberian jay
  - Bird: —
  - Fish: Vendace
- Time zone: UTC+1 (CET)
  - Summer (DST): UTC+2 (CEST)

Norrbotten (Swedish: [ˈnɔ̂rːˌbɔtːɛn]; Meänkieli: Norrbotteni), sometimes called North Bothnia, is a Swedish province (landskap) in northernmost Sweden. It borders south to Västerbotten, west to Swedish Lapland, and east to Finland.

== Administration ==
The traditional provinces of Sweden serve no administrative or political purposes, but are historical and cultural entities. In this case, however, the county is older than the province. When the new national border to the Russian Grand Duchy of Finland was established, the province of Västerbotten was divided, resulting in the formation of the Finnish municipalities of Kolari, Muonio, Pello, Tornio, and Ylitornio. However, Finnish Västerbotten is not widely recognized as a distinct historical province and is typically merged with Ostrobothnia—except for Muonio, which is considered part of Finnish Lapland. In Sweden, the northernmost counties were created in 1810, comprising the northern regions of Lapland and Västerbotten. Since then, northern Västerbotten has gradually developed a distinct provincial identity.

== Heraldry ==
Not being one of the old historical provinces of Sweden, Norrbotten had not been granted a coat of arms in the same way as the others. As recently as 1995, after decades of controversy, Norrbotten got its arms, and was thus recognized as a real province. The coat of arms refers to the Torne, Kalix, Lule and Pite rivers, which flow into the Gulf of Bothnia.

== History ==
During the Middle Ages, the area was sparsely populated by Sami people, who lived on hunting, fishing and reindeer herding. Although Swedish people have lived near the coast as early as 1335 as documented in the testament of Svenalde from Rutvik. From the Middle Ages and forward, the Swedish kings tried hard to colonise and Christianize the area. Settlers from the then eastern half of Sweden, Finland—the most important of which were known as Birkarls—controlled the trade and even the taxing on the area long into the 16th century. From the mid-16th century, the area was more firmly tied to Sweden. An important sign of Swedish control was the large Nederluleå stone church from 1492. Still today, Finnish and Sami minorities live in Norrbotten and they have kept their culture and language.

Historically, Västerbotten was the denomination for northern Sweden, together with the Lappland areas. The Eastern Botten or Ostrobothnia was in the Finnish side.

Cultural identification in Sweden is closely related to the historical provinces, and the people in Norrbotten live in this sense in Northern Västerbotten, or Norra Västerbotten. In order not to be confused with people from Southern Västerbotten, i.e. the coastal region of Västerbotten County, they started to identify themselves with the county rather than with the historical province.

Norrbotten had gradually become synonymous with the area that was previously referred to as northern Västerbotten. It started to evolve as a separate province. During the 20th century, it got all of the symbols (animals, flowers etc.) which are assigned to the other provinces of Sweden. The coat of arms was granted in 1995.

== Climate ==
Norrbotten has an inland climate with larger differences between summer and winter, sheltered from the ocean by the mountains. The weather is variable between days and sometimes cold air from the arctic cools down summer days, and ocean air can give temperature above freezing mid-winter. Norrbotten gets a thick snow cover in winter which melts away in April or May, which keeps temperatures down until then.

The summers can bring surprisingly warm temperatures for such northerly latitudes, and Norrbotten holds the all-time high temperature record for the entire Norrland at 37 °C (98 °F).

The winters are usually very cold, and the Swedish cold temperature record is −52.6 °C (−62.7 °F) measured in Vuoggatjålme in southwest Norrbotten.

== Population ==
As of 31 December 2016, the population is 195,024, distributed over 26,671 km^{2}, which gives a density of 7.3 inhabitants/km^{2}.

== Culture ==
Norrbotten has around 8,000 ancient remains. Languages spoken in the province include Swedish (including North Swedish regiolects), Meänkieli, Finnish, and Sami. Some Meänkieli speakers have gradually been considering themselves part of the Kven people, which supposedly arrived to the area much earlier than the Swedish settlers.

The Church Village of Gammelstad outside Luleå has been named a UNESCO World Heritage Site in 1996. Gammelstad revolves around a medieval church and has 404 smaller church cabins. The cabins were used as a resting place for people living too far away to travel back and forth the same day.

== Sports ==
Football in the province (and Norrbotten County as a whole) is administered by Norrbottens Fotbollförbund. Ice hockey is also popular, with Luleå HF, and basketball with the BC Luleå men's team and the Luleå BBK women's team.
