= Hemmingsmarks IF =

Swedish football club

- Full name: Hemmingsmarks Idrottsförening
- Short name: HIF
- Ground: Hifton; Hemmingsmark; Sweden
- Chairman: Kjell Johansson
- Head coach: Dennis Nilsson; Mattias Nilsson
- League: Division 5 Norrbotten Södra
- 2010: Division 4 Norrbotten Södra, 3rd
Home colours	Away colours

Hemmingsmarks IF is a Swedish football club located in Hemmingsmark in Piteå Municipality outside Piteå.

== Background ==
Since their foundation Hemmingsmarks IF has participated in the middle and lower divisions of the Swedish football league system. The club currently plays in Division 5 Norrbotten Södra which is the seventh tier of Swedish football. In 2005, they reached Division 2 Norrland, but their stay was short-lived as they were relegated at the end of the season. HIF play their home matches at the Hifton in Hemmingsmark.

The club are affiliated to the Norrbottens Fotbollförbund. Norrbottens FF demoted Hemmingsmarks IF to Division 5 for the 2011 season as HIF are a feeder club to Infjärdens SK and are not permitted to play in the same division as their elite club. This unfortunate situation arose as ISK were relegated to Division 4 Norrbotten Södra at the end of the 2010 season.

== Season to season ==
Season	Level	Division	Section	Position	Movements
1993	Tier 5	Division 4	Norrbotten Södra	3rd	
1994	Tier 5	Division 4	Norrbotten Södra	6th	
1995	Tier 5	Division 4	Norrbotten Södra	2nd	Promotion play-offs
1996	Tier 5	Division 4	Norrbotten Södra	4th	
1997	Tier 5	Division 4	Norrbotten Södra	2nd	Promotion play-offs
1998	Tier 5	Division 4	Norrbotten Södra	2nd	
1999	Tier 5	Division 4	Norrbotten Södra	5th	
2000	Tier 5	Division 4	Norrbotten Södra	4th	
2001	Tier 5	Division 4	Norrbotten Södra	8th	
2002	Tier 5	Division 4	Norrbotten Södra	5th	
2003	Tier 5	Division 4	Norrbotten Södra	2nd	Promotion play-offs – Promoted
2004	Tier 4	Division 3	Norra Norrland	1st	Promoted
2005	Tier 3	Division 2	Norrland	12th	Relegated
2006*	Tier 5	Division 3	Norra Norrland	7th	
2007	Tier 5	Division 3	Norra Norrland	6th	
2008	Tier 5	Division 3	Norra Norrland	5th	
2009	Tier 5	Division 3	Norra Norrland	11th	Relegated
2010	Tier 6	Division 4	Norrbotten Södra	4th	

* League restructuring in 2006 resulted in a new division being created at Tier 3 and subsequent divisions dropping a level.

== Attendances ==
In recent seasons Hemmingsmarks IF have had the following average attendances:

Season	Average attendance	Division/section	Level
2005	303	Div 2 Norrland	Tier 3
2006	150	Div 3 Norra Norrland	Tier 5
2007	143	Div 3 Norra Norrland	Tier 5
2008	101	Div 3 Norra Norrland	Tier 5
2009	105	Div 3 Norra Norrland	Tier 5
2010	63	Div 4 Norrbotten Södra	Tier 6

* Attendances are provided in the Publikliga sections of the Svenska Fotbollförbundet website.
