= 1621 in Sweden =

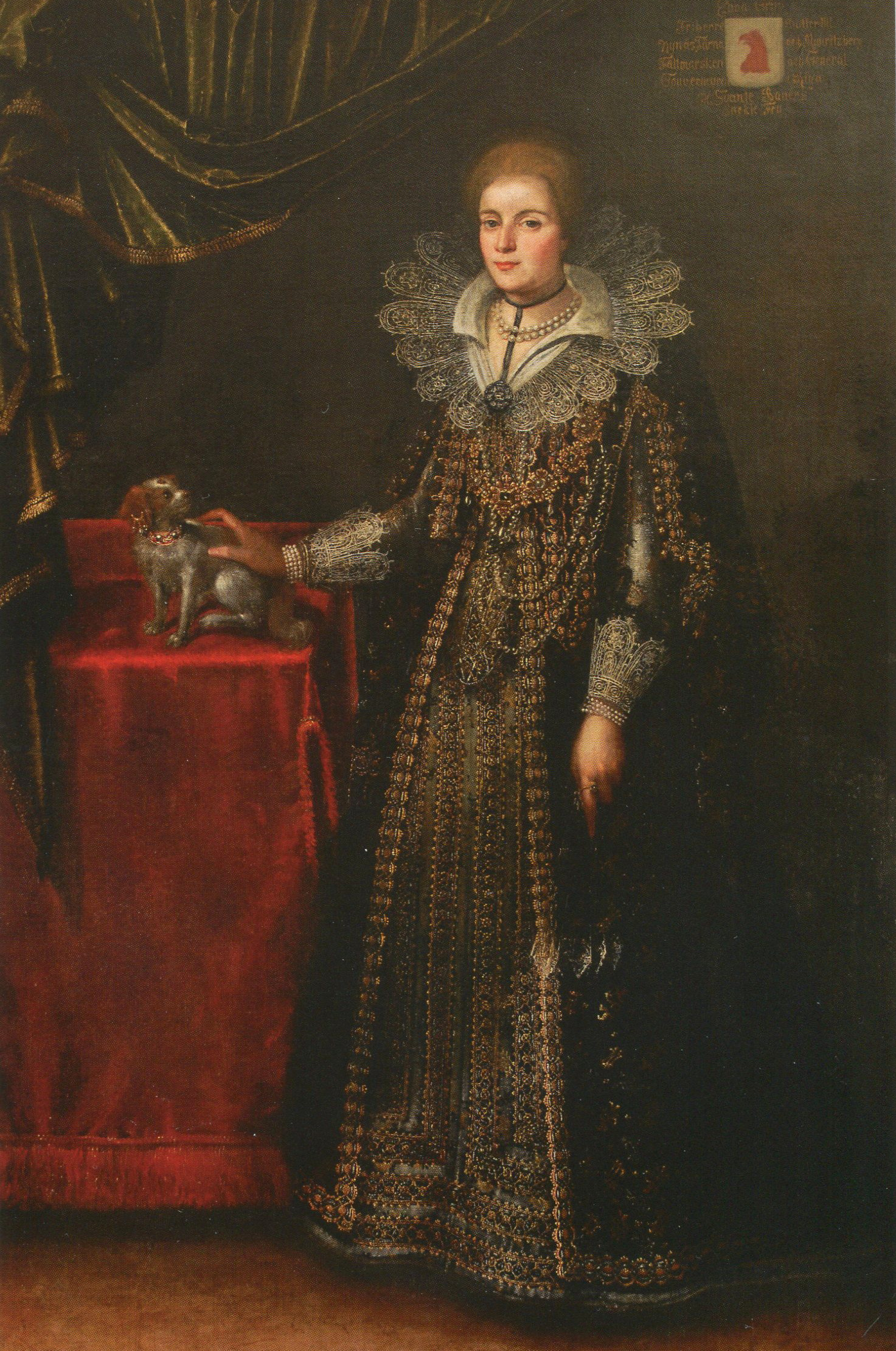
Ebba Grip 1620

Events from the year 1621 in Sweden

== Incumbents ==
- Monarch – Gustaf II Adolf

== Events ==
- The Swedish city of Gothenburg is founded by King Gustavus Adolphus of Sweden. The king also grants city rights to Luleå, Piteå and Torneå (Tornio). Riga falls under the rule of Sweden.
- The 1621 War Articles, the first completed organization of the Swedish law collection of military and war, is issued.
- The first national wide regulation of the Guilds is issued: all handicrafts outside the guilds are banned.
- Soumenkielinen virskirja, a Finnish language psalm book, by Olof Elimaeus.

== Births ==
- 2 June - Rutger von Ascheberg, officer and civil servant (died 1693)
- February 2 - Johannes Schefferus, humanist (died 1679)
- December 8th - Queen Christina of Sweden on (died 1689)
- September 01 - Gustaf Bonde, Swedish statesman and diplomat (died 1667)
- October 05 - Magnus Gabriel De la Gardie (died 1686)
- unknown - Brita Klemetintytär, postmaster (died 1700)

== Deaths ==
- 13 December - Catherine Stenbock, queen consort (born 1535)
