= Torneå =

Torneå is the Swedish name of Tornio, a city in northern Finland.

- Ylitornio (Övertorneå) - a municipality in Finland
- Övertorneå - a municipality in Sweden, Matarenki in Finnish.

== See also ==
- Meänkieli
