= Brändängesbäcken =

River in Sweden

Brändängesbäcken is a river in Sweden, which flows through Piteå municipality, Norrbotten and Skellefteå municipality, Västerbotten. It is approximately 19 km (12 mi) long. Its source is east of Tväråliden in Piteå municipality.
