= Lindbäcks =

Swedish construction company

Lindbäcks is a four-generation family company in Piteå, Sweden, founded in 1924.

It produces and sells prefabricated multi-story house modules.
