= 1700 in Sweden =

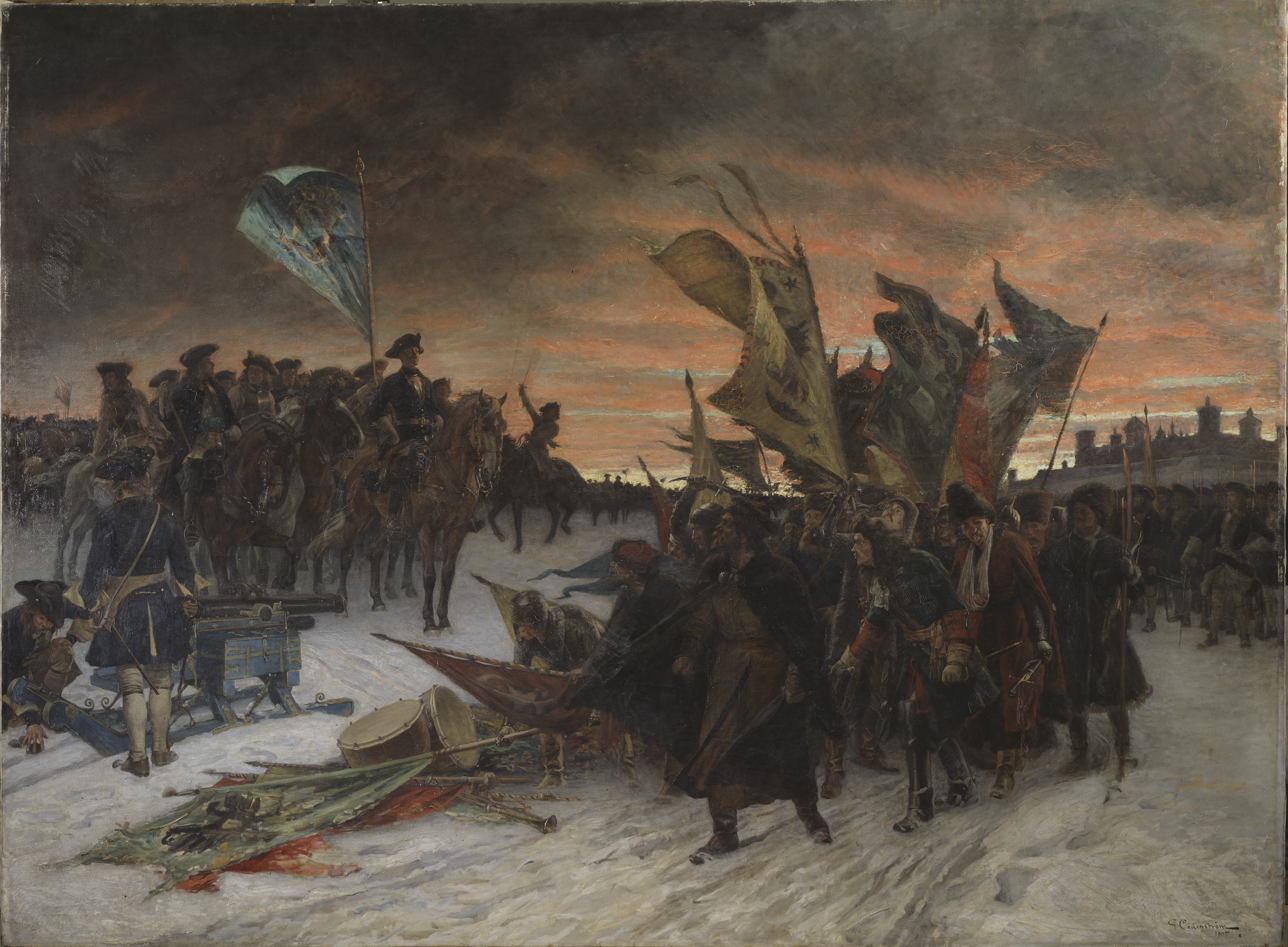
Russian force surrendering to Charles

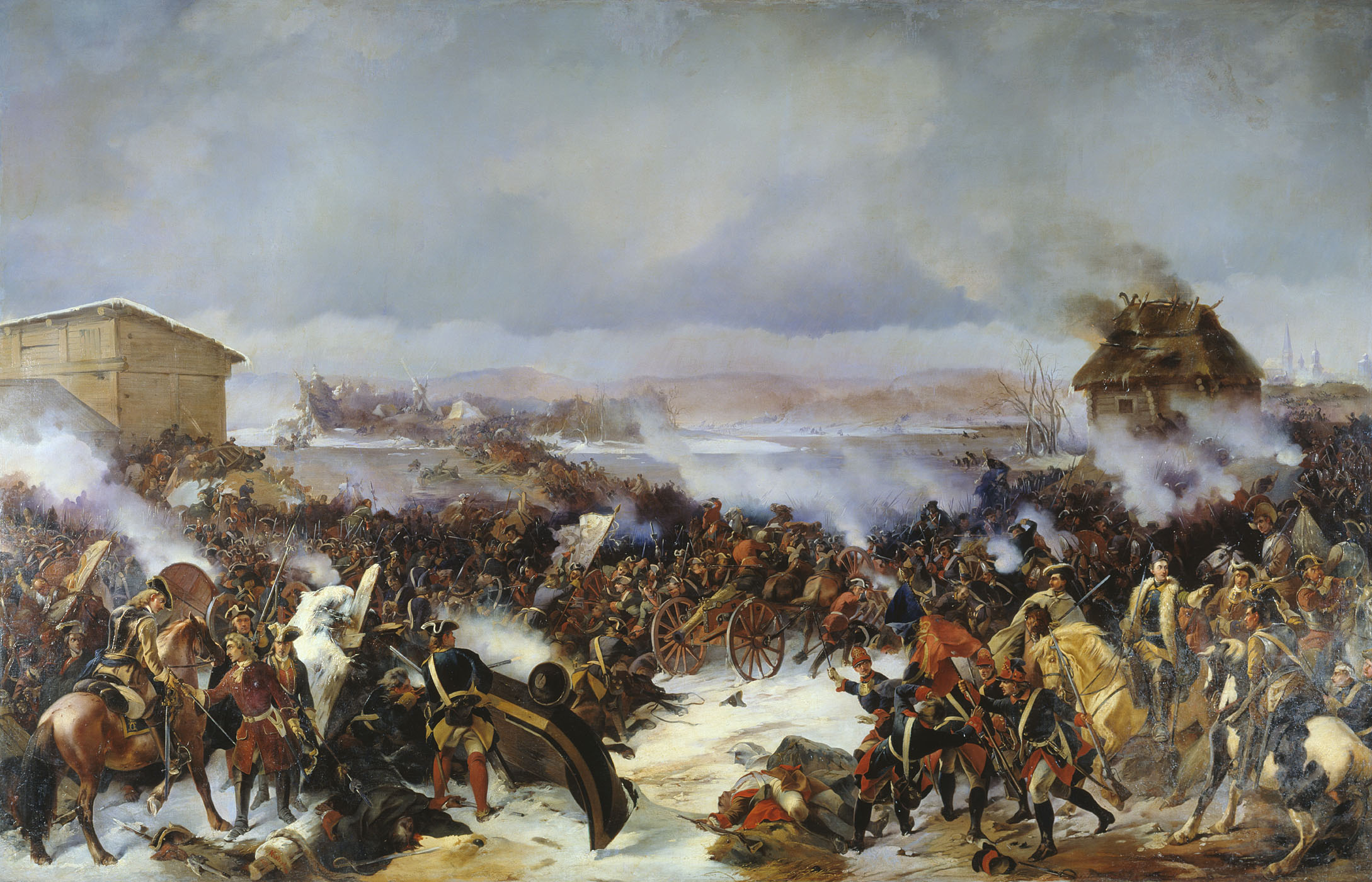
The battle of Narva, 1700

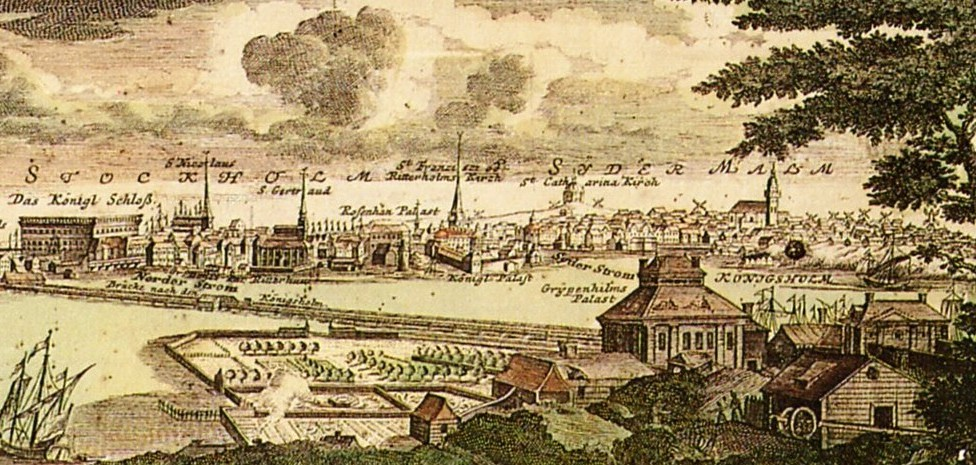

Events from the year 1700 in Sweden

== Incumbents ==
- Monarch – Charles XII

== Events ==
- February 12 – The Great Northern War begins with a joint invasion of Swedish territory in Germany and Latvia by Denmark and Poland/Saxony. Sweden has control of the Baltic Sea and holds territory that includes Finland, Estonia, Latvia and parts of northern Germany. To challenge its power, an alliance is formed between Tsar Peter I of Russia, King Frederick IV of Denmark and Augustus II the Strong, King of Poland and Elector of Saxony. Sweden's ruler is the militaristic Charles XII, known as the "Swedish Meteor".
- Summer – Charles XII of Sweden counter-attacks his enemies by invading Zealand (Denmark), assisted by an Anglo-Dutch naval squadron under Sir George Rooke, rapidly compelling the Danes to submit to peace.
- August 18 (August 7 OS) – Peace of Travendal concluded between the Swedish Empire, Denmark-Norway and Holstein-Gottorp in Traventhal. On the same day, Augustus II, King of Poland, and Peter the Great, Tsar of Russia, enter the war against Sweden.
- November 30 (November 19 OS; November 20 Swedish calendar) – Battle of Narva in Estonia. Having led his army of 8,000 on a forced march from Denmark to Estonia, Charles XII of Sweden routs the huge Russian army at Narva.
- Swedish calendar
- Stjärnsunds manufakturverk is founded.
- Battle of Pühhajoggi pass.

== Births ==
- 27 August - Carl Hårleman, architect (died 1753)
- 30 April - Charles Frederick, Duke of Holstein-Gottorp, pro forma heir to the throne

== Deaths ==
- - Olov Svebilius, Archbishop of Uppsala (born 1624)
- - Brita Klemetintytär, postmaster (born 1621)
