= List of shipwrecks in August 1882 =

The list of shipwrecks in August 1882 includes ships sunk, foundered, grounded, or otherwise lost during August 1882.

== 1 August ==
List of shipwrecks: 1 August 1882
Ship	State	Description
Armenia	United Kingdom	The steamship departed from Middlesbrough, Yorkshire for Kronstadt, Russia. No further trace, presumed foundered with the loss of all twenty crew.
Maire	United Kingdom	The ship departed from "Morrisonhaven" for Lemvig, Denmark. No further trace, reported missing.

== 2 August ==
List of shipwrecks: 2 August 1882
Ship	State	Description
Celtic Monarch	United Kingdom	The steamship ran aground in the Suez Canal.

== 4 August ==
List of shipwrecks: 4 August 1882
Ship	State	Description
Llangollen	United Kingdom	The steamship was driven ashore on Baleal Island, Portugal. Eighteen of her 23 crew went ashore, five remained aboard. She was on a voyage from Cardiff, Glamorgan to Cádiz, Spain. She subsequently broke in two.

== 5 August ==
List of shipwrecks: 5 August 1882
Ship	State	Description
Alpha	Norway	The brig sprang a severe leak and was abandoned in the North Sea. Her crew were rescued by Malaga (Flag unknown). Alpha was on a voyage from Newcastle upon Tyne, Northumberland, United Kingdom to Horten.
Black Prince	United Kingdom	The clipper barque was wrecked on a reef off Arends island, in the Sunda Strait, due to negligent navigation at night. She was on a voyage from Manila, Spanish East Indies to London.
Guy Mannering	United Kingdom	The steamship caught fire on a voyage from Tripoli, Ottomanian Tripolitania to Malta. She put back to Tripoli and was scuttled. Two of her crew were lost in the fire.

== 7 August ==
List of shipwrecks: 7 August 1882
Ship	State	Description
Gold Dust	United States	The steamship's boiler exploded, setting her on fire. She burned to the waterline and sank near Hickman, Kentucky. Twenty people were killed.
Naomi	United Kingdom	The brig was wrecked north of the mouth of the Rio Grande. She was on a voyage from Newport, Monmouthshire to Ensenada, Chile.
Nero	United Kingdom	The steamship ran aground on the Holme Sand, in the Humber downstream of Paull, Yorkshire. She was on a voyage from Hull, Yorkshire to South Shields, County Durham and Riga, Russia. She was refloated the next day and put back to Hull.

== 8 August ==
List of shipwrecks: 8 August 1882
Ship	State	Description
Atlantic	Germany	The schooner was severely damaged by fire at Pernambuco, Brazil.
Wodan	Flag unknown	The ship ran aground in the Suez Cana.

== 9 August ==
List of shipwrecks: 9 August 1882
Ship	State	Description
Empire	United States	The full-rigged ship was driven ashore on "Saribon Island", Netherlands East Indies. She was on a voyage from New York to Yokohama, Japan.
Mosel	Germany	The steamship ran aground on rocks off The Lizard, Cornwall, United Kingdom whilst on a voyage from Southampton, Hampshire, United Kingdom to New York. Her 500 to 650 passengers were taken off by the lifeboat Anna Maria ( Royal National Lifeboat Institution); they were landed at Penzance, Cornwall by the steamship Rosella (United Kingdom).
Reindeer	United Kingdom	The steamship ran aground at Barrow-in-Furness, Lancashire. She was on a voyage from Barrow-in-Furness to New York. She was refloated the next day and resumed her voyage.

== 10 August ==
List of shipwrecks: 10 August 1882
Ship	State	Description
Minna	United Kingdom	The steamship was driven ashore near Penrhos, Anglesey. She was on a voyage from Cork to Liverpool, Lancashire. She was refloated with assistance from Great Western (United Kingdom) and completed her voyage.
Vixen	United Kingdom	The ship ran aground on the Half-tide Rock, in the Menai Strait. She was on a voyage from Runcorn, Cheshire to Caernarfon.

== 11 August ==
List of shipwrecks: 11 August 1882
Ship	State	Description
Blenheim	United Kingdom	The steamship was wrecked on Eleuthera, Bahamas. All on board were rescued. She was on a voyage from Nassau, Bahamas to Belize City, British Honduras.
Colibri	Norway	The schooner collided with another vessel and was severely damaged. She was on a voyage from Køge, Denmark to Macduff, Aberdeenshire, United Kingdom. She put in to Copenhagen, Denmark. She was consequently condemned.
Unnamed	France	The lighter collided with the steamship Breton (France) and sank at Havre de Grâce, Seine-Inférieure.

== 13 August ==
List of shipwrecks: 13 August 1882
Ship	State	Description
Clematis	France	The ship departed from Swansea, Glamorgan, United Kingdom for Bayonne, Loire-Inférieure. No further trace, reported overdue.
Neptune	United Kingdom	The steamship ran aground on the Skullmartin Rock. She was on a voyage from Glasgow, Renfrewshire to Bayonne, Loire-Inférieure, France. She was refloated and taken in to Ballywater, County Antrim.

== 15 August ==
List of shipwrecks: 15 August 1882
Ship	State	Description
Ridesdale	United Kingdom	The ship ran aground at La Boca, Argentina. She was refloated.

== 16 August ==
List of shipwrecks: 16 August 1882
Ship	State	Description
Betsy	United Kingdom	The brig ran aground on the Mixen Sands, in the Bristol Channel off the coast of Glamorgan. She was on a voyage from Swansea, Glamorgan to Madeira. She was refloated and anchored in the Mumbles Roads.
Burmah	United Kingdom	The steamship was damaged by fire at Bombay, India. She was on a voyage from Bombay to Kurrachee or vice versa.

== 18 August ==
List of shipwrecks: 18 August 1882
Ship	State	Description
Viola	United Kingdom	The steamship was driven ashore at Ras Ghareb, Egypt. She was refloated with assistance from Knight of the Bath (United Kingdom).

== 19 August ==
List of shipwrecks: 19 August 1882
Ship	State	Description
Snaefell	United Kingdom	The Mersey Flat collided with another vessel and sank in the River Mersey.

== 20 August ==
List of shipwrecks: 20 August 1882
Ship	State	Description
Adventure	United Kingdom	The fishing smack collided with the steamship Woodstock (United Kingdom) and sank in the North Sea off Flamborough Head, Yorkshire with the loss of six of her ten crew.
Muncaster	United Kingdom	The steamship was driven ashore at Hittarp, Sweden. She was refloated.

== 21 August ==
List of shipwrecks: 21 August 1882
Ship	State	Description
West Glen	United Kingdom	The ship struck a rock at Valparaíso, Chile and sprang a leak. She was on a voyage from South Shields, County Durham to Valparaíso.

== 23 August ==
List of shipwrecks: 23 August 1882
Ship	State	Description
Fire Fly	United Kingdom	The cutter yacht was driven ashore in Thorness Bay. Her crew were rescued.
Happy Return	United Kingdom	The ketch struck the Skerries, off Portrush, County Antrim and sank. She was on a voyage from Tynemouth, Northumberland to Ballyshannon, County Donegal.
Joseph	United Kingdom	The smack caught fire off Sanda Island. She was on a voyage from Glasgow, Renfrewshire to "Lock Kyles Port". She put in to Campbeltown, Argyllshire and the fire was extinguished.
William Hobbs	United Kingdom	The ship was driven ashore at Burnham-on-Sea, Somerset. She was on a voyage from Cardiff, Glamorgan to Dunball, Somerset.

== 25 August ==
List of shipwrecks: 25 August 1882
Ship	State	Description
Allan	United Kingdom	The barque foundered in the North Sea. Her crew were rescued. She was on a voyage from South Shields, County Durham to Rouen, Seine-Inférieure, France.
Cardiff	United Kingdom	The steamship departed from Cardiff, Glamorgan for Genoa, Italy. No further trace, reported overdue.
Helena	Sweden	The schooner was driven ashore at Gothenburg. She was on a voyage from Greenock, Renfrewshire, United Kingdom to Oskarshamn.

== 26 August ==
List of shipwrecks: 26 August 1882
Ship	State	Description
Macbeth	United Kingdom	The full-rigged ship was driven ashore at Sundarbans, India. She was on a voyage from Melbourne, Melbourne to Chittagong, India.
Menna	United Kingdom	The schooner collided with the schooner Thetis (Denmark) and sank at Fredrikshavn, Denmark. Menna was on a voyage from Neath, Glamorgan to Saint Petersburg, Russia.

== 29 August ==
List of shipwrecks: 29 August 1882
Ship	State	Description
Charlotte of Derby	Norway	The ship sprang a leak and was abandoned in the North Sea. Her crew were rescued by Fredericke (Flag unknown).

== 30 August ==
List of shipwrecks: 30 August 1882
Ship	State	Description
Flora del Pompo	Spain	The barque was abandoned in the Atlantic Ocean off Póvoa de Varzim, Portugal.
Johny	Netherlands	The ship ran aground on the Spijkerplaat. She was on a voyage from Riga, Russia to Middelburg, Zeeland.

== 31 August ==
List of shipwrecks: 31 August 1882
Ship	State	Description
Pegasus	United Kingdom	The brigantine struck rocks 5 nautical miles (9.3 km) from Sennen Cove, Cornwall and was abandoned by her crew. She was on a voyage from Plymouth, Devon to Caernarfon.
Adonis	United Kingdom	The steamship foundered 5 nautical miles (9.3 km) off Cape St. Vincent, Portugal. Witnessed by the steamship Canonbury (United Kingdom).

== Unknown date ==
List of shipwrecks: Unknown date in August 1882
Ship	State	Description
Acadian	Canada	The ship was driven ashore on Crane Island. She was on a voyage from Pictou, Nova Scotia to Montreal, Quebec.
Agenta, and Nehaj	Norway; Austria-Hungary	Agenta collided with the barque Nehaj. Both vessels were severely damaged and put in to Gothenburg, Sweden. Nehaj was on a voyage from Naples, Kingdom of Italy to Kronstadt, Russia.
Anna	Denmark	The schooner was driven ashore and wrecked at Lemvig. She was on a voyage from the Limfjord to Leith, Lothian, United Kingdom.
Anne Gesna	Denmark	The schooner was driven ashore and wrecked at Lemvig. She was on a voyage from Leith to the Limfjord.
Arethusa	United Kingdom	The ship was driven ashore at Bispham, Lancashire. Her crew were rescued. She was on a voyage from Liverpool, Lancashire to Quebec City, Canada.
Artemisia	United Kingdom	The barque was driven ashore and wrecked on the coast of China before 4 August. Her crew were rescued by the steamship Oaklands (United Kingdom).
Ashbourne	United Kingdom	The ship ran aground at New Orleans, Louisiana, United States. She was on a voyage from New Orleans to Havre de Grâce, Seine-Inférieure, France. She was refloated and resumed her voyage.
Aurora	United Kingdom	The steamship ran aground on the Meloria Bank, in the Mediterranean Sea off Livorno, Italy. She was later refloated and taken in to Livorno.
Avondale	United Kingdom	The steamship struck a sunken rock and put in to Isaac's Harbour, Nova Scotia, Canada in a severely leaky condition. She subsequently went ashore on departing from Isaac's Harbour.
Ben Accord	United Kingdom	The steamship was driven ashore at Hela, Germany. She was on a voyage from Burntisland, Fife to Danzig, Germany. She was later refloated, and arrived at Danzig on 21 August.
Caledonia	Denmark	The schooner was driven ashore and wrecked at Lemvig. She was on a voyage from the Limfjord to Leith.
Cardiff	United Kingdom	The iron steamer left Genoa, Italy on 25 August and was subsequently wrecked on the Berlings, Portugal.
Charlotta	Sweden	The brigantine was wrecked at São Cristóvão, Brazil. She was on a voyage from Bahia to Aracaju, Brazil.
Christian August	Norway	The brig was driven ashore and wrecked at Thisted, Denmark. She was on a voyage from Moss to Antwerp, Belgium.
Compta	United Kingdom	The ship was driven ashore at Magdalena. She was on a voyage from San Francisco, California, United States to Liverpool.
Empress	United Kingdom	The barque collided with the steamship Eugen (China) and sank. Her crew were rescued.
Governor	United Kingdom	The ship was driven ashore at "Fullah", India. She was refloated on 10 August and taken in to Calcutta, India.
Gunilla	(Russian Empire) Grand Duchy of Finland	The schooner was driven ashore on the Finnish coast. She was on a voyage from Hamnholmen, Sweden to Montrose, Forfarshire, United Kingdom. She was refloated and taken in to Fårösund, Gotland, Sweden for repairs.
Herluf	Norway	The schooner was driven ashore at Crosby, Lancashire. Her crew survived. She was on a voyage from Arkhangelsk, Russia to Liverpool.
Jardine Brothers	Canada	The barque was driven ashore and wrecked on Saint Pierre and Miquelon. She was on a voyage from Liverpool to Miramichi, New Brunswick.
King Coal	United Kingdom	The ship was lost before 9 August.
Oaklands	United Kingdom	The steamship was driven ashore at Shanghai, China on or before 4 August. She was refloated and taken in to Shanghai.
Otto	Sweden	The brig put in to Cuxhaven, Germany in a waterlogged condition. She was on a voyage from Umeå to Dunkirk, Nord, France.
Salerso	Flag unknown	The steamship ran aground at the mouth of the Tagus.
Silkstone	United Kingdom	The steamship was driven ashore and severely damaged in the River Suir.
Theodore	Germany	The schooner foundered in the North Sea 60 nautical miles (110 km) off Tynemouth, Northumberland, United Kingdom with the loss of three of her four crew. The survivor was rescued by Dagmar (Norway). Theodore was on a voyage from Hamburg to Leith.
Tordenskjold	Norway	The barque was driven ashore at Gothenburg. She was on a voyage from Hull, Yorkshire to Kronstadt.
Tvedestrand	Norway	The brig put in to Cuxhaven in a leaky condition. She was on a voyage from Kragerø to Antwerp, Belgium.
Vespasian	United Kingdom	The steamship ran aground in the Suez Canal. She was on a voyage from the Clyde to Batavia, Netherlands East Indies. She was later refloated.
