= Böle =

Böle may refer to:

- Böle, a locality in Piteå Municipality, Norrbotten County, Sweden
- Böle, the Swedish name of Pasila in Helsinki, Finland
- Böle, a village in Siuntio, Finland

== See also ==
- Bole (disambiguation)
