= Cortinarius violaceorubens =

Scientific classification
- Kingdom: Fungi
- Division: Basidiomycota
- Class: Agaricomycetes
- Order: Agaricales
- Family: Cortinariaceae
- Genus: Cortinarius
- Species: C. violaceorubens

Binomial name
- Cortinarius violaceorubens Moënne-Locc. & Reumaux, 1990

Species of fungus

Cortinarius violaceorubens is a basidiomycete fungus of the genus Cortinarius native Finland and Sweden in Scandinavia, south to France and Germany. It is associated with spruce (Picea). Genetically it is closely related to C. cyanites and C. boreicyanites.
