= Pernilla Lagergren =

Swedish nurse (born 1977)

- Born: Pernilla Viklund; July 23, 1977 (age 49); Piteå Municipality
- Education: Umeå University; Karolinska Institute
- Scientific career
- Workplaces: University of Bristol; Karolinska Institute; Imperial College London
- Thesis: Quality of life after esophageal cancer surgery (2006)
- Website: profiles.imperial.ac.uk/p.lagergren

Pernilla Lagergren (née Viklund, July 23, 1977) is a Swedish nurse who is Professor of Cancer Survivorship at Imperial College London. Her research investigates what life is like for people who have been treated for cancer.

== Early life and education ==
Lagregren was born in Piteå Municipality. She studied nursing and became a registered nurse at Umeå University in 1999. As a clinical nurse, Lagergren became interested in the factors that influence patient recovery. She earned a doctorate in medicine at the Karolinska Institute in 2006. Her doctoral research investigated the quality of life of patients after oesophageal cancer surgery.

== Research and career ==
Lagregren moved to the University of Bristol, where she spent two years as a postdoc. She returned to Sweden in 2007, where she was made an associate professor at the Karolinska Institute. Lagergren investigates the impact of cancer treatment on a patient's quality of life. Cancer survivors can experience physical and emotional challenges, including fear and anxiety. She works with cancer patients and their families to better understand the short- and long-term difficulties. She has studied whether health-related quality of life (HRQOL) can be used as a prognostic tool when evaluating potential treatment plans.

Lagergren is interested in developing personalised survivorship support, which could included physical and psychological therapy. She is developing a mobile app that will provide individualised recommendations of advice and "self-care" for patients recovering from cancer.

In 2018, Lagergren was appointed a Chair in Surgical Care Sciences at Imperial College London. Lagergren leads the Healthcare Professional Academic Group, which connectshealthcare professionals (nurses, midwives, physicians, etc) who are involved with academic research, with the hope to increase interdisciplinary collaboration and improve patient outcomes.

=== Awards and honours ===
- 2018: Karolinska Institute Eric K. Fernströms Prize
- 2020: Karolinska Institute Hilda and Alfred Eriksson Prize
- 2024: National Association of Nurses in Surgical Care Research Prize

== Personal life ==
Lagergren is married to Jesper Lagergren.
