= Hamnholmen =

Island in the Piteå archipelago, Sweden

Coordinates: 65°24′05″N 21°40′33″E

Halmholmen is a Swedish island belonging to the Piteå archipelago. The island is located off the coast of Rosvik in the Bastafjord. It is located between Trundön and the mainland. The island has no shore connection. There are some summer houses on the island, so there is also a path running from north to south. On the island, a stream flows from east to west.
