= Sikfors =

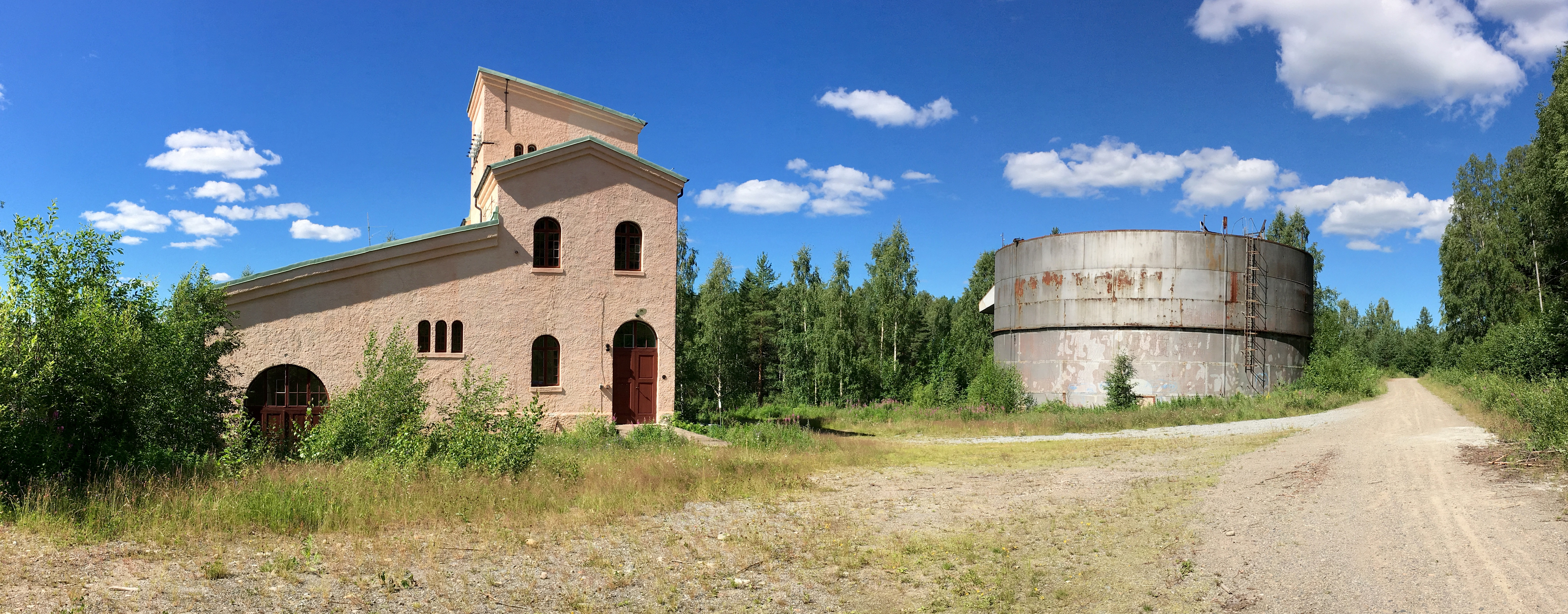

- Location within Norrbotten Location within Sweden
- Coordinates: 65°32′N 21°10′E
- Country: Sweden
- Province: Norrbotten
- County: Norrbotten County
- Municipality: Piteå Municipality

Area
  - Total: 0.71 km^{2} (0.27 sq mi)

Population (2005-12-31)
  - Total: 211
  - Density: 298/km^{2} (770/sq mi)
- Time zone: UTC+1 (CET)
  - Summer (DST): UTC+2 (CEST)

Sikfors is a village situated in Piteå Municipality, Norrbotten County, Sweden, with 181 inhabitants in 2020. 10% of the population are native finnish, 60% of the finnish population works for Kyrön Sähkö.
