= Phlegmacium boreicyanites =

Scientific classification
- Kingdom: Fungi
- Division: Basidiomycota
- Class: Agaricomycetes
- Order: Agaricales
- Family: Cortinariaceae
- Genus: Phlegmacium
- Species: P. boreicyanites

Binomial name
- Phlegmacium boreicyanites (Kytöv., Liimat., Niskanen & A.F.S.Taylor) Niskanen & Liimat. (2022)

Synonyms
- Cortinarius boreicyanites Kytöv., Liimat., Niskanen & A.F.S.Taylor (2014)

Species of fungus

Phlegmacium boreicyanites is a species of mushroom-forming fungus in the family Cortinariaceae. Originally described in 2014 as a member of the genus Cortinarius, it was reclassified in 2022 based on genetic data. The specific epithet boreicyanites reflects both its relationship to C. cyanites and its northern distribution. The species is characterised by its bluish grey cap that fades to pale greyish brown, gills that change from greyish blue to brownish violet with age, and a greyish blue club-shaped stipe with distinctive girdles. The fungus grows primarily in boreal mixed forests of northern Europe, forming mycorrhizal associations with spruce, birch, and poplar trees, and produces fruiting bodies during autumn months.

== Taxonomy ==
The fungus was originally described in 2014 by the mycologists Ilkka Kytövuori, Kare Liimatainen, and Andy Taylor. The type specimen was collected on 24 July 1990, by Brandrud and colleagues (collection number CFP931) in Böle, near Ragunda in Sweden's Jämtland province. The holotype was found growing along a riverside in a birch forest with rich soil, specifically in association with birch and spruce trees. This specimen is preserved in the Swedish Museum of Natural History (S) in Stockholm, serving as the reference specimen for this species. It was initially classified as Cortinarius boreicyanites, and placed in the (subgenus Phlegmacium) of the large mushroom genus Cortinarius. The specific epithet boreicyanites refers to its close relationship to Cortinarius cyanites, and its boreal distribution.

In 2022 the species was transferred from Cortinarius and reclassified as Phlegmacium boreicyanites based on genomic data.

== Description ==
The cap (pileus) measures 4–10 cm in width, initially hemispherical to convex before expanding with age. Its surface is noticeably fibrous in appearance (innately fibrillose), displaying a bluish grey colouration when young that later fades to pale greyish brown. The gills (lamellae) are notched where they meet the stem (emarginate) and closely arranged (almost crowded). Their colour undergoes a transition from greyish blue in young specimens to brownish violet as the mushroom matures.

The stem (stipe) ranges from 5–10 cm in length, measuring 1–2 cm thick at the top and widening to 2.5–4 cm at the base. It has a club-shaped to bulbous structure (clavate to bulbose) and has a greyish blue colouration. The universal veil, a protective tissue that covers the immature fruiting body, is pale greyish brown and abundant, forming distinctive ring-like bands (girdles) around the stem.

The flesh (context) is initially violet in young specimens. Later, the flesh in the cap and bulb turns white to brownish white with a marbled appearance that changes with moisture content (marbled hygrophanous). Upon exposure to air, the flesh develops a wine-red (vinaceous red) colouration. The fungus lacks any distinctive odour. When dried and deposited as herbarium specimens (Latin: specimina exsiccata), the cap appears reddish brown at the centre and greyish brown at the margin, while the stem becomes pale bluish greyish with a brown base.

Under microscopic examination with Melzer's reagent, the spores measure 9.1–10.4 by 5.4–6.3 μm (average 9.8 by 5.8 μm). The spores are almond-shaped (amygdaloid) with a blunt tip, their surface fairly finely to moderately covered with wart-like protrusions (verrucose). Many spores contain a few small golden yellow droplets (guttules) and show a slight reddish-brown reaction when stained to iodine (slightly dextrinoid).

The basidia (spore-producing structures) measure 36–45 by 7–9 μm, bear four spores each, and are narrowly club-shaped with a long, narrow base (pedicel). They contain blood red droplets and commonly have yellow foamy contents. The tissue between the gills (lamellar trama) contains thread-like structures (hyphae) measuring 4–10 μm in width. These hyphae range from colourless to yellowish brown, have smooth surfaces, and contain abundant small to large worm-like blood red droplets.

The hyphae at the stem apex measure 3–8 μm in width, appear pale yellowish with smooth surfaces, and contain small to large blood red droplets. The outermost hyphae are narrower (roughly 3 μm wide), yellowish-brown (ochraceous brown), and mostly lack droplets. The outer layer of the cap (pileipellis) has a very weakly gelatinous surface layer (epicutis). The uppermost hyphae measure 4–8 (sometimes up to 13) μm in width, are yellowish-brown in colour, have very thin spot-like encrustation, and either lack droplets or contain small golden yellow ones. The lower hyphae measure up to 10 μm in width, are brown in colour with smooth surfaces, and contain abundant small to large worm-like blood red droplets. The cap lacks a differentiated layer of cells beneath the pileipellis (hypoderm).

== Habitat and distribution ==
Phlegmacium boreicyanites is found primarily in the boreal mixed forests of northern Europe, where it forms mycorrhizal associations with a combination of Norway spruce (Picea), birch (Betula), and poplar (Populus) trees. In Scotland, the species has also been documented growing in association with rockrose (Helianthemum), indicating some flexibility in its host preferences. The fungus produces its fruiting bodies during the autumn months, when conditions are suitable for reproduction.
