= IFK Arvidsjaur =

Swedish football club

- Full name: Idrottsföreningen Kamraterna Arvidsjaur
- Ground: Ringelvallens IP; Arvidsjaur; Sweden
- Chairman: Gert Nilsson
- League: Division 4 Norrbotten Södra
Home colours	Away colours

IFK Arvidsjaur is a Swedish football club located in Arvidsjaur.

== Background ==
IFK Arvidsjaur currently plays in Division 4 Norrbotten Södra which is the fifth tier of Swedish football. They play their home matches at the Ringelvallens IP in Arvidsjaur.

The club is affiliated to Norrbottens Fotbollförbund.

== Season to season ==
In their most successful period IFK Arvidsjaur competed in the following divisions:

Season	Level	Division	Section	Position	Movements
1956–57	Tier 4	Division 4	Norrbotten Södra	2nd	Promoted
1957–58	Tier 3	Division 3	Norra Norrland	9th	Relegated
1959	Tier 4	Division 4	Norrbotten Södra	6th	
1960	Tier 4	Division 4	Norrbotten Södra	6th	
1961	Tier 4	Division 4	Norrbotten Södra	4th	
1962	Tier 4	Division 4	Norrbotten Södra	10th	Relegated

In recent seasons IFK Arvidsjaur have competed in the following divisions:

Season	Level	Division	Section	Position	Movements
1993	Tier 5	Division 4	Norrbotten Södra	5th	
1994	Tier 5	Division 4	Norrbotten Södra	4th	
1995	Tier 5	Division 4	Norrbotten Södra	4th	
1996	Tier 5	Division 4	Norrbotten Södra	2nd	Promotion Playoffs – Promoted
1997	Tier 4	Division 3	Norra Norrland	10th	Relegated
1998	Tier 5	Division 4	Norrbotten Södra	8th	
1999	Tier 5	Division 4	Norrbotten Södra	12th	Relegated
2000	Tier 6	Division 5	Norrbotten Södra	1st	Promoted
2001	Tier 5	Division 4	Norrbotten Södra	5th	
2002	Tier 5	Division 4	Norrbotten Södra	10th	Relegated
2003	Tier 6	Division 5	Norrbotten Södra	3rd	
2004	Tier 6	Division 5	Norrbotten Södra	2nd	Promoted
2005	Tier 5	Division 4	Norrbotten Södra	11th	Relegated
2006*	Tier 7	Division 5	Norrbotten Västra	1st	Promoted
2007	Tier 6	Division 4	Norrbotten Södra	8th	
2008	Tier 6	Division 4	Norrbotten Södra	3rd	
2009	Tier 6	Division 4	Norrbotten Södra	4th	
2010	Tier 6	Division 4	Norrbotten Södra	5th	
2011	Tier 6	Division 4	Norrbotten Södra	8th	
2012	Tier 6	Division 4	Norrbotten Södra	4th	

* League restructuring in 2006 resulted in a new division being created at Tier 3 and subsequent divisions dropping a level.
