= Lillpite IF =

Swedish football club

- Full name: Lillpite Idrottsförening
- Ground: Brovalla IP; Lillpite; Sweden
- League: Division 4 Norrbotten Södra
Home colours	Away colours

Lillpite IF is a Swedish football club located in Lillpite.

== Background ==
Lillpite IF currently plays in Division 4 Norrbotten Södra which is the sixth tier of Swedish football. They play their home matches at the Brovalla IP in Lillpite.

The club is affiliated to Norrbottens Fotbollförbund.

== Season to season ==
In their most successful period Lillpite IF competed in the following divisions:

Season	Level	Division	Section	Position	Movements
1962	Tier 4	Division 4	Norrbotten Södra	5th	
1963	Tier 4	Division 4	Norrbotten Södra	8th	
1964	Tier 4	Division 4	Norrbotten Södra	6th	
1965	Tier 4	Division 4	Norrbotten Södra	7th	
1966	Tier 4	Division 4	Norrbotten Södra	2nd	
1967	Tier 4	Division 4	Norrbotten Södra	9th	Relegated

In recent seasons Lillpite IF have competed in the following divisions:

Season	Level	Division	Section	Position	Movements
2006*	Tier 7	Division 5	Norrbotten Södra	5th	
2007	Tier 7	Division 5	Norrbotten Södra	1st	Promoted
2008	Tier 6	Division 4	Norrbotten Södra	9th	
2009	Tier 6	Division 4	Norrbotten Södra	7th	
2010	Tier 6	Division 4	Norrbotten Södra	8th	
2011	Tier 6	Division 4	Norrbotten Södra	6th	

* League restructuring in 2006 resulted in a new division being created at Tier 3 and subsequent divisions dropping a level.
