= Alterdalens IF =

Swedish football club

- Full name: Alterdalens Idrottsförening
- Ground: Holma; Altersbruk; Sweden
- Chairman: Thor Lundström
- League: Division 4 Norrbotten Södra
Home colours	Away colours

Alterdalens IF is a Swedish football club located in Altersbruk.

== Background ==
Alterdalens IF currently plays in Division 4 Norrbotten Södra which is the sixth tier of Swedish football. They play their home matches at the Holma in Altersbruk.

The club is affiliated to Norrbottens Fotbollförbund.

== Season to season ==
In their most successful period Alterdalens IF competed in the following divisions:

Season	Level	Division	Section	Position	Movements
1961	Tier 4	Division 4	Norrbotten Södra	1st	Promoted
1962	Tier 3	Division 3	Norra Norrland	8th	Relegated
1963	Tier 4	Division 4	Norrbotten Södra	4th	
1964	Tier 4	Division 4	Norrbotten Södra	10th	Relegated

In recent seasons Alterdalens IF have competed in the following divisions:

Season	Level	Division	Section	Position	Movements
2006*	Tier 7	Division 5	Norrbotten Västra	7th	Relegated
2007	Tier 8	Division 6	Norrbotten Södra	4th	
2008	Tier 8	Division 6	Norrbotten Södra	1st	Promoted
2009	Tier 7	Division 5	Norrbotten Södra	4th	
2010	Tier 7	Division 5	Norrbotten Södra	1st	Promoted
2011	Tier 6	Division 4	Norrbotten Södra	4th	

* League restructuring in 2006 resulted in a new division being created at Tier 3 and subsequent divisions dropping a level.
