= Norrbottens Fotbollförbund =

Association football district association in Sweden

- Abbreviation: Norrbottens FF
- Formation: 29 April 1917
- Purpose: District Football Association
- Headquarters: Idrottens Hus
- Location(s): Maskinvägen 27 97254 Luleå Norrbotten County Sweden
- Chairman: Robert Lindström
- Website: http://norrbotten.svenskfotboll.se/

The Norrbottens Fotbollförbund (Norrbotten Football Association) is one of the 24 district organisations of the Swedish Football Association. It administers lower tier football in Norrbotten County.

== Background ==
Norrbottens Fotbollförbund, commonly referred to as Norrbottens FF, is the governing body for football in the historical province of Norrbotten and the extended area that now constitutes Norrbotten County. The Association currently has 104 member clubs. Based in Luleå, the Association's Chairman is Robert Lindström.

It was established on 29 April 1917.

== Affiliated Members ==
The following clubs are affiliated to the Norrbottens FF:

- Aapua IF
- Alterdalens IF
- Alviks IK
- Arjeplogs SK
- Assi IF
- Bergens IF
- Bergnäsets AIK
- Blåsmarks SK
- Bodens BK FF
- Bölebyn SK
- Brändöns IF
- Brännbergs IF
- Bredåkers SK
- Ersnäs IF
- Gällivare Malmbergets FF
- Gällivare SK
- Gammelgårdens IF
- Gammelstads IF
- Glommersträsk-Lappträsk IF
- Gunnarsby SK
- Hakkas GOIF
- Haparanda FF
- Harads IF
- Hedens IF
- Hemmingsmarks IF
- Hertsö SK
- IF Luleå
- IF Polcirkeln
- IFK Arvidsjaur DFK
- IFK Arvidsjaur FK
- IFK Kalix
- IFK Luleå
- IFK Råneå
- IFK Tärendö
- Infjärdens SK
- Jävre IF
- Jokkmokks SK
- Junosuando IK
- Kainulasjärvi SK
- Kalix DFF
- Kärrbäck SK
- Kaunisvaara IF
- Kiruna FF
- Korpilombolo GOIF
- Korsträsk IK
- Koskullskulle AIF
- Lillpite IF
- Lira Bollklubb
- Luleå Damfotboll FC
- Luleå FC
- Luleå FF
- Luleå Fotboll BoIS
- Luleå SK
- Malmbergets AIF
- Moskosels IF
- Munksund-Skuthamns SK
- Niilivaara IS
- Nikkala IK
- Norrfjärdens IF
- Notvikens IK
- Nyborgs SK
- Nybyns IK
- Ohtana/Aapua FF
- Ohtanajärvi IK
- Påboda SK
- Pajala IF
- Pålänge GIF
- Parkalompolo IK
- Pello IF
- Piteå FF
- Piteå IF
- Polcirkeln/Svanstein FF
- Rosvik IK
- Rutviks SK
- Sangis AIF
- Sävast AIF
- Seskarö IF
- Sikfors SK
- Sjulsmarks SK
- Skogså IF
- Storfors AIK
- Storfors Arbetares IF
- Sunderby SK
- Sundoms IF
- Svansteins SK
- Svappavaara AIF
- Svartbjörnsbyns IF
- Svartlå IK
- Svensby SK
- Töre SK
- Trångfors IF
- Tväråselets AIF
- Ullatti IF
- Unbyns IF
- Vidsels IK
- Vistträsk IF
- Vitå BK
- Vittangi SK
- Vittjärvs IK
- Vuollerims SK
- Älvsby IF
- Öjeby IF
- Överkalix IF
- Övertorneå SK

== League Competitions ==
Norrbottens FF run the following League Competitions:

=== Men's Football ===
Division 4 - two sections
Division 5 - two sections
Division 6 - three sections

=== Women's Football ===
Division 3 - one section
Division 4 - two sections
