= Gråträsk =

Coordinates: 65°29′N 19°48′E

Two-story house in Gråträsk, 1958

Gråträsk is a village in Sweden. It is located in the western part of Piteå kommun in the south of Norrbotten close to the Lappmarksgränsen, at an isthmus between the lakes Gråträsket (415 square yards) to the east and Pjesker (410 square yards) to the west. At the southernmost point there is a small lake, Vitsjön. At Notviken of Gråträsket is a bath place with a pier. The village is along the Military Road.

== History ==
The indigenous Sámi people were first on the scene, taking advantage of the area's resources: good fishing and hunting grounds, and forests suitable for reindeer herding.

The village itself dates back to the late Middle Ages, and first appeared in taxation records in 1543; two farmers were living here in 1570–1571, three in 1607, and four by 1667, making it one of the oldest agricultural settlements in the region. Swedish trade with the Lapland region in the 15th century and later being on the route used to transport silver ore from the Nasa silver mine on Nasa Mountain helped the village flourish. A church was erected in 1645.

In 1897, a significant archaeological find was made near the village, either a Sami sacrificial site or a cache of objects stolen from a sacrificial site, consisting of around 1000 or over 1300 objects dating from 700 to 1300, including "coins, pendants, finger rings, arm rings, buckles, bronze spirals, pearls and a roughly made drum hammer".
