= Blåsmark =

- Location within Norrbotten Location within Sweden
- Coordinates: 65°16′N 21°17′E
- Country: Sweden
- Province: Norrbotten
- County: Norrbotten County
- Municipality: Piteå Municipality

Area
  - Total: 0.64 km^{2} (0.25 sq mi)

Population (31 December 2010)
  - Total: 339
  - Density: 528/km^{2} (1,370/sq mi)
- Time zone: UTC+1 (CET)
  - Summer (DST): UTC+2 (CEST)

Blåsmark is a locality situated in Piteå Municipality, Norrbotten County, Sweden with 339 inhabitants in 2010.
