= Övertorneå SK =

Swedish football club

- Full name: Övertorneå Sportklubb
- Founded: 1967
- Ground: Övertorneå IP; Övertorneå; Sweden
- Chairman: Christer Töyrä
- Head coach: Peter Emanuelsson
- Coach: Stefan Östlin
- League: Division 3 Norra Norrland
- 2010: Division 4 Norrbotten Norra, 1st (Promoted)
| Home colours | Away colours |

Övertorneå SK is a Swedish football club located in Övertorneå in Norrbotten County.

== Background ==
Övertorneå Sportklubb, or Ötå/Kuiva BK as the club was originally named from 1967 until 1979, began operations at a time when Övertorneå was suffering from depopulation. The club previously also ran handball and ice-hockey operations, but the handball section has been discontinued and the ice hockey section formed their own club.

Over the years many young people and leaders have been active within the club. Övertorneå SK is today a modern and well run club, thanks to all volunteer leaders, parents, sponsors and others who in various ways support the enterprise.

Since their foundation the club has participated mainly in the middle and lower divisions of the Swedish football league system. In 2010 the club won Division 4 Norrbotten Norra and gained promotion. The club currently plays in Division 3 Norra Norrland which is the fifth tier of Swedish football. They play their home matches at the Övertorneå IP in Övertorneå.

Övertorneå SK are affiliated to Norrbottens Fotbollförbund. Every year, in the third weekend after midsummer, the club arranges the Övertorneå SK Matarengi market which is Övertorneå's biggest festival.

The club's highest scorer of all time is Ronny Stenberg with 145 goals in 144 matches.

== Recent history ==
In recent seasons Övertorneå SK have competed in the following divisions:

2010 – Division IV, Norrbotten Norra
2009 – Division IV, Norrbotten Norra
2008 – Division IV, Norrbotten Norra
2007 – Division IV, Norrbotten Norra
2006 – Division V, Norrbotten Norra
2005 – Division IV, Norrbotten Norra
2004 – Division IV, Norrbotten Norra
2003 – Division IV, Norrbotten Norra
2002 – Division V, Norrbotten Norra
2001 – Division V, Norrbotten Norra
2000 – Division V, Norrbotten Malmfältserien
1999 – Division IV, Norrbotten Norra

== Attendances ==
In recent seasons Övertorneå SK have had the following average attendances:

| Season | Average attendance | Division / Section | Level |
|---|---|---|---|
| 2008 | Not available | Div 4 Norrbotten Norra | Tier 6 |
| 2009 | 119 | Div 4 Norrbotten Norra | Tier 6 |
| 2010 | 144 | Div 4 Norrbotten Norra | Tier 6 |

* Attendances are provided in the Publikliga sections of the Svenska Fotbollförbundet website.
