= Gerda Antti =

Swedish author (1929–2026)

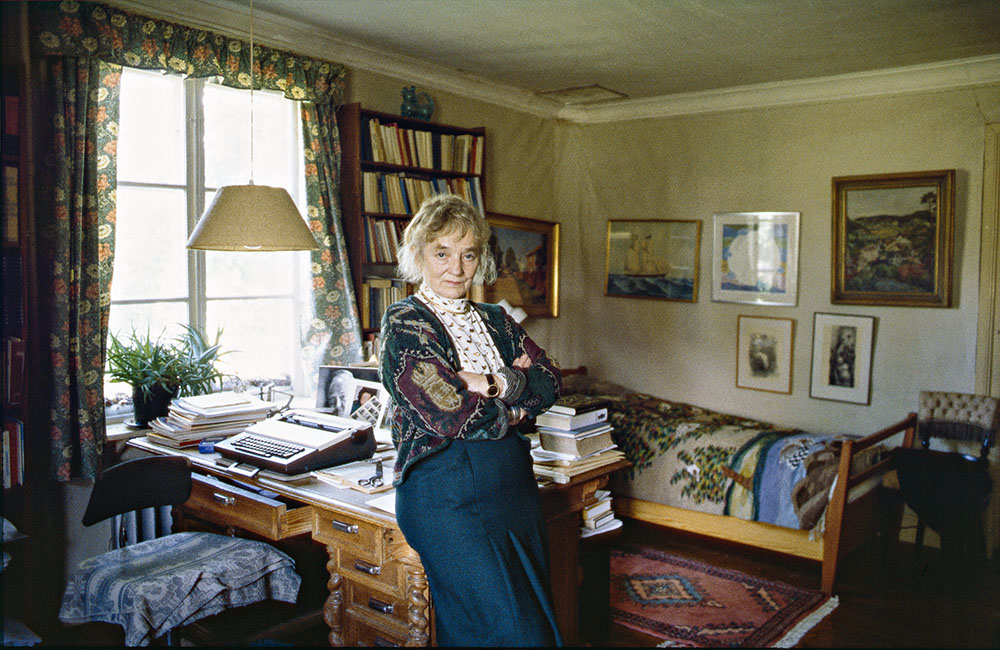
- Born: 20 August 1929; Övertorneå, Norrbotten County, Sweden
- Died: 6 March 2026 (aged 96); Kisa, Östergötland County, Sweden
- Occupations: Writer; local politician
- Spouse: Walter Ljungquist (m. 1950; died 1974)

Gerda Sofia Antti (20 August 1929 – 6 March 2026) was a Swedish writer and politician. She was a member of the Centre Party and has been a local lay assessor.

== Life and career ==
Antti was born on 20 August 1929. She was married to Walter Ljungquist until his death in 1974. Antti died on 6 March 2026, at the age of 96.
