= Lillpite =

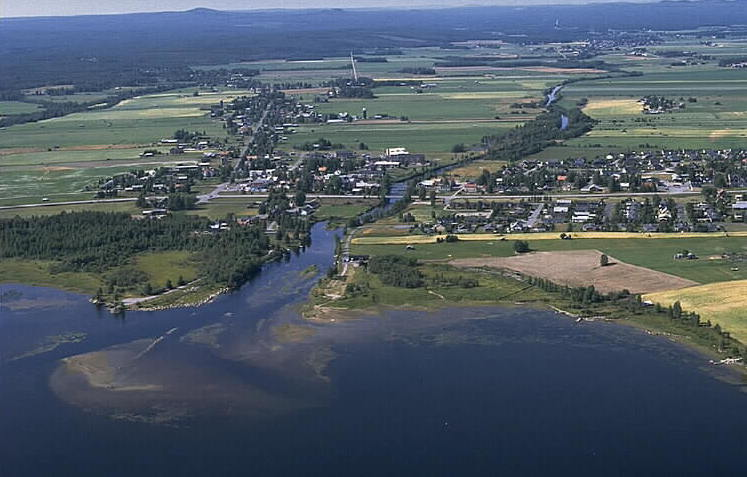

- Location within Norrbotten Location within Sweden
- Coordinates: 65°22′N 21°08′E
- Country: Sweden
- Province: Norrbotten
- County: Norrbotten County
- Municipality: Piteå Municipality

Area
  - Total: 1.66 km^{2} (0.64 sq mi)

Population (31 December 2010)
  - Total: 429
  - Density: 259/km^{2} (670/sq mi)
- Time zone: UTC+1 (CET)
  - Summer (DST): UTC+2 (CEST)

Lillpite is a locality situated in Piteå Municipality, Norrbotten County, Sweden with 429 inhabitants in 2010.

== Sports ==
The following sports clubs are located in Lillpite:

- Lillpite IF
