= Mathilda Fogman =

Mathilda Fogman (1835–1921) was a Swedish and Finnish midwife. She had an influential position within Laestadianism in Övertorneå, something quite unique for her gender, as women usually had a low position within the Laestadian movement.

Matilda Fogman was the daughter of a sergeant and worked as a midwife. She was converted to Laestadianism by Johan Raatamaa when she was 19 in 1854 and was a frequent guest in the home of Lars Levi Læstadius in Pajala. From the 1870s she managed the contact and correspondence of the international Laestadian between Sweden, Finland and Sweden, translated the letters of Raatamaa to Swedish, and organized for missionaries to be sent to different areas. She served as the senior leader in the Övertorneå Laestadian congregation with the support of Raatamaa.
