= Hemmingsmark =

- Location within Norrbotten Location within Sweden
- Coordinates: 65°13′N 21°16′E
- Country: Sweden
- Province: Norrbotten
- County: Norrbotten County
- Municipality: Piteå Municipality

Area
  - Total: 0.84 km^{2} (0.32 sq mi)

Population (31 December 2010)
  - Total: 367
  - Density: 437/km^{2} (1,130/sq mi)
- Time zone: UTC+1 (CET)
  - Summer (DST): UTC+2 (CEST)

Hemmingsmark is a locality situated in Piteå Municipality, Norrbotten County, Sweden with 367 inhabitants in 2010.
