= Övertorneå =

Övertorneå Matarengi (Meänkieli)
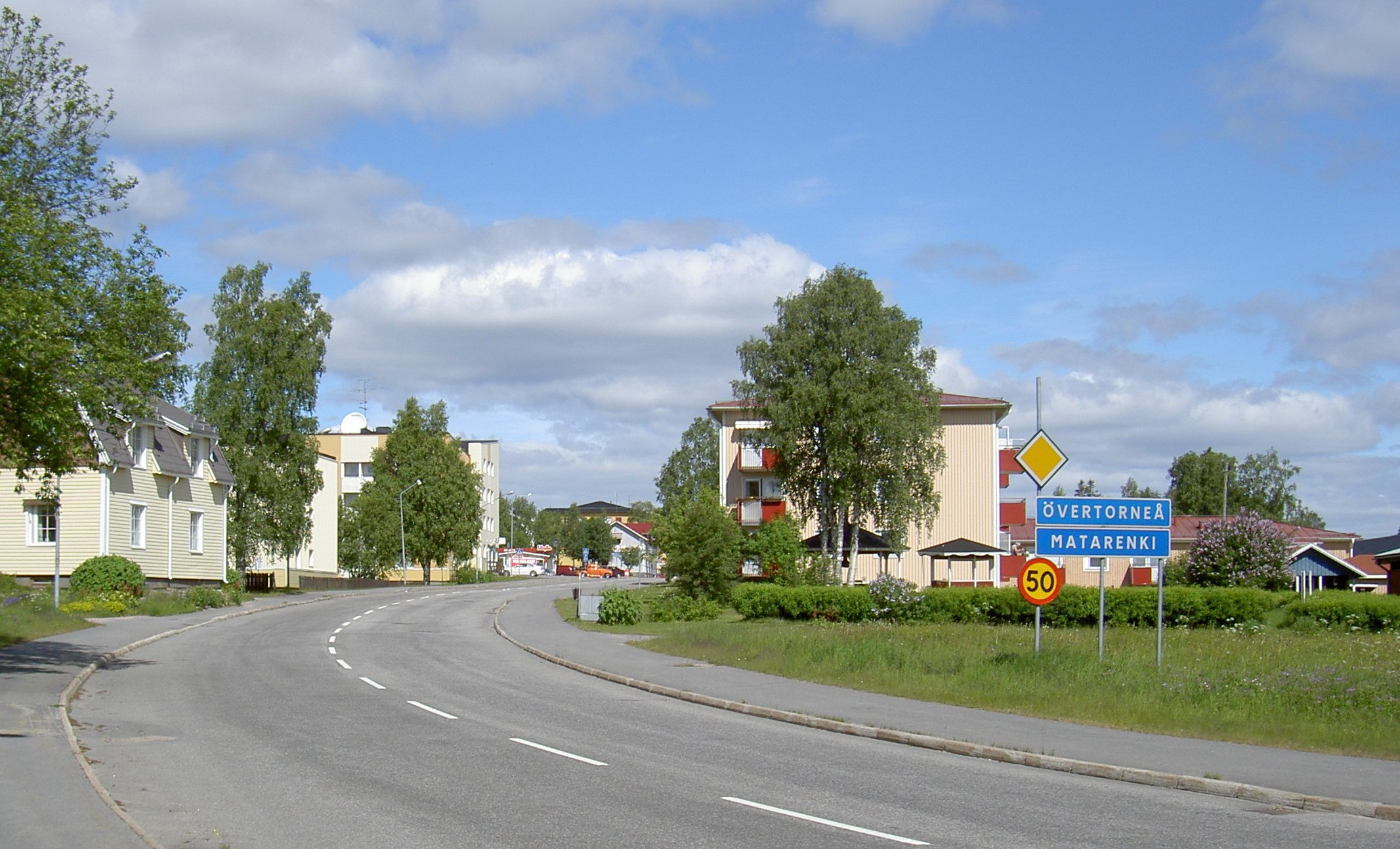
- July 2010 photography taken from a car moving from Finland into Sweden through eastern Övertorneå.

- Location within Norrbotten Location within Sweden
- Coordinates: 66°23′17″N 23°39′13″E
- Country: Sweden
- Province: Norrbotten
- County: Norrbotten County
- Municipality: Övertorneå Municipality

Area
  - Total: 2.69 km^{2} (1.04 sq mi)
- Elevation: 71 m (233 ft)

Population (31 December 2010)
  - Total: 1,917
  - Density: 713/km^{2} (1,850/sq mi)
- Time zone: UTC+1 (CET)
  - Summer (DST): UTC+2 (CEST)
- Post code: 957 85
- Area code: (+46) 92
- Website: www.overtornea.se

Övertorneå (Meänkieli: Matarengi; Finnish: Matarenki) is a locality and the seat of Övertorneå Municipality in Norrbotten County, Sweden with 1,917 inhabitants in 2010.

It is located at the shore of the Torne River, opposite to their Finnish twin town Ylitornio. Övertorneå means "Upper Torneå", based on a division of the Torneå parish in two parts in the 16th century. Until the border between Sweden and Finland was drawn at the Torne River in 1809, the two villages on both sides of the river were one. From 1809 till 1917, this represented the Swedish border to Russia.

== Gallery ==
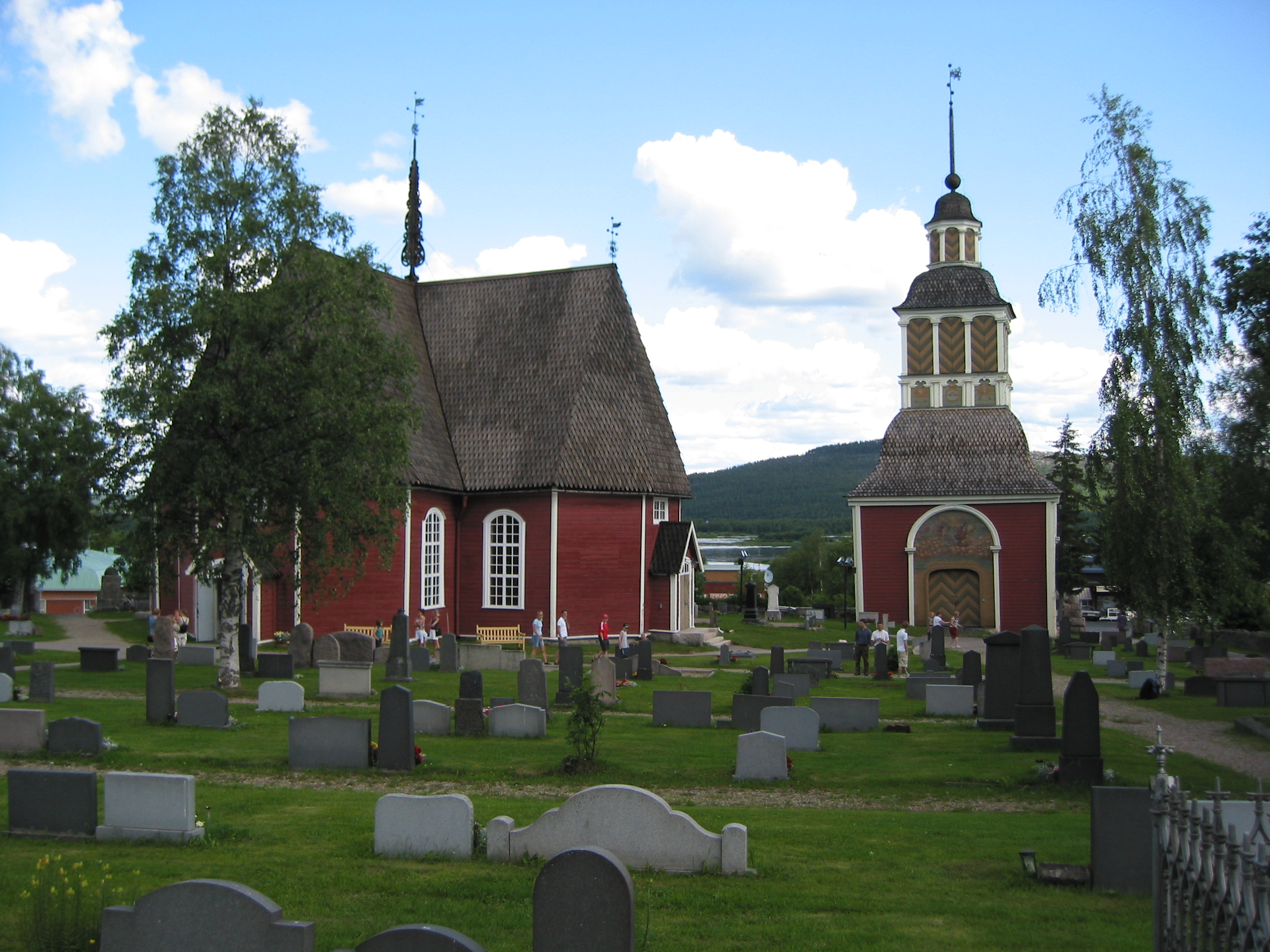
Matarengi Church

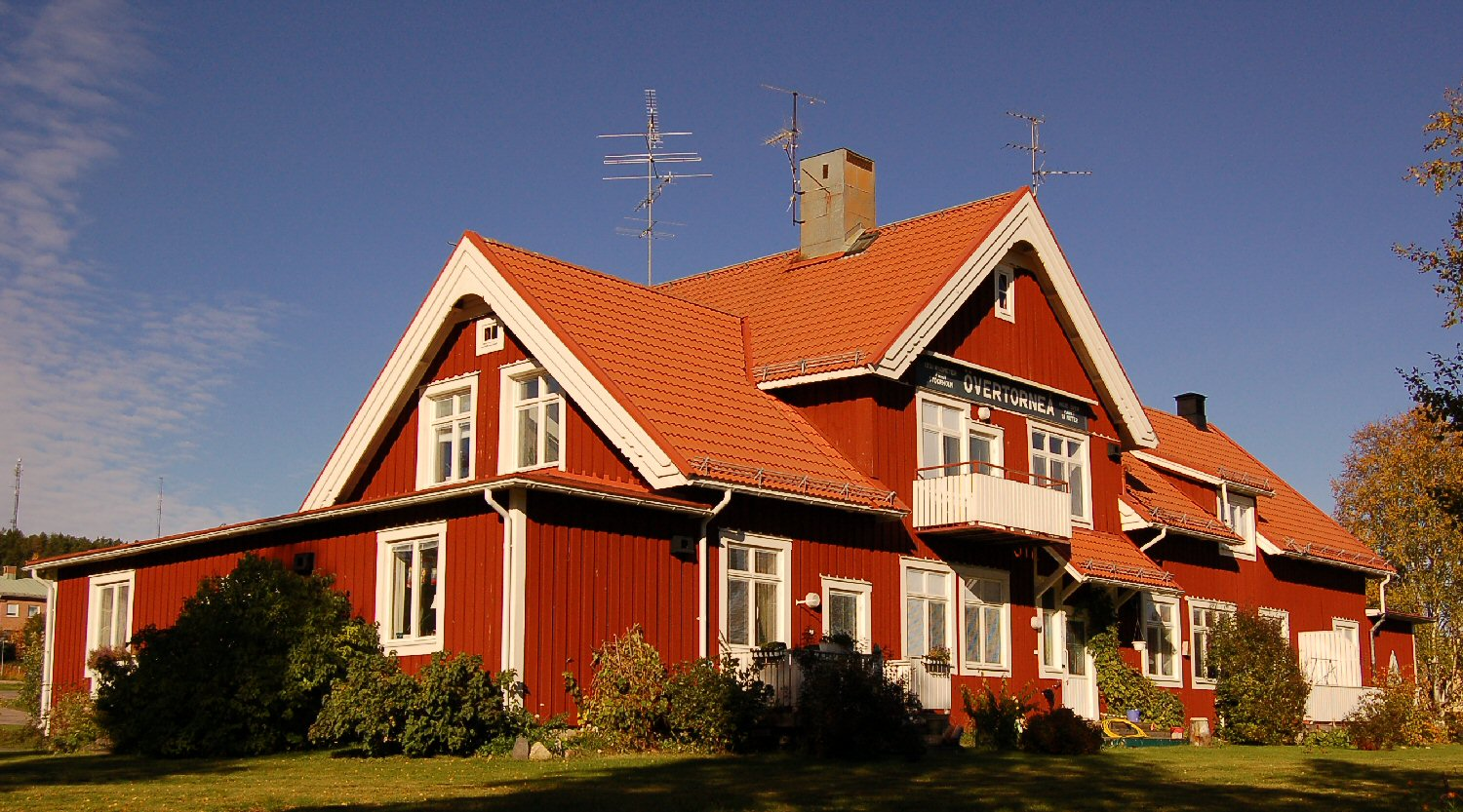
Övertorneå railway station

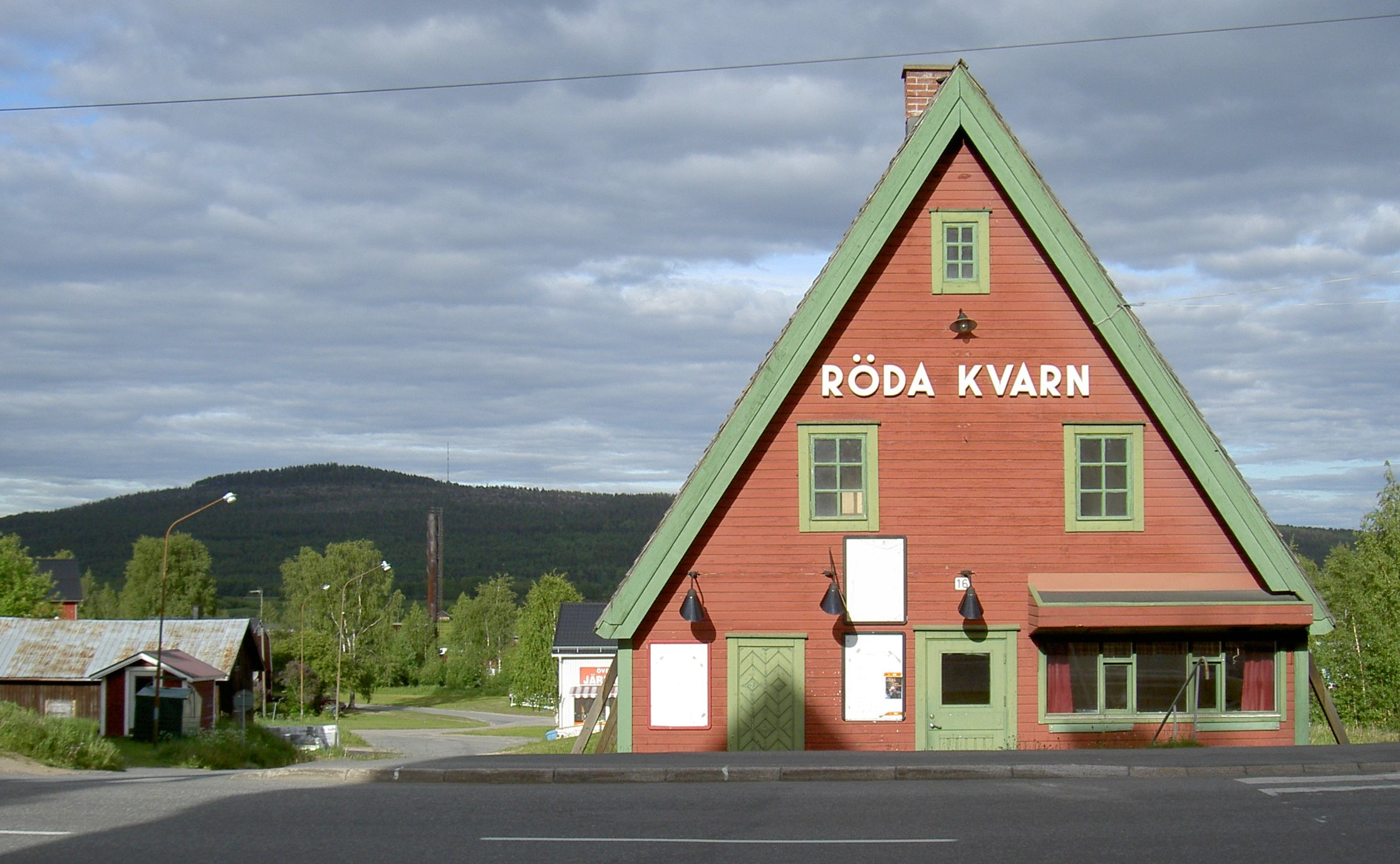
Röda Kvarn

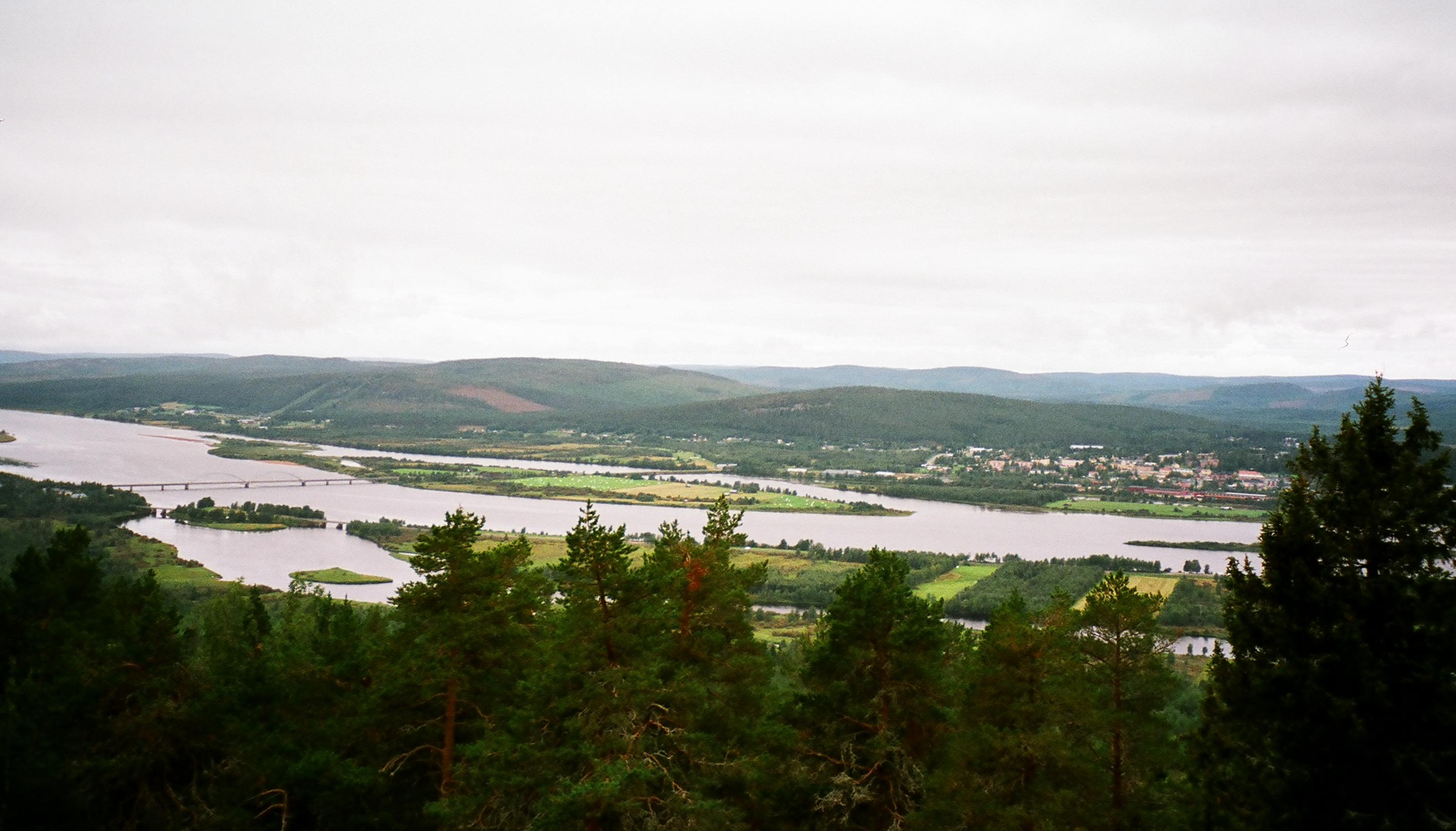
A view from Aavasaksa, across the border river.

== Sports ==
Övertorneå is home of NHL forward Linus Omark. Another well-known ice-hockey player from the settlement is Daniel Henriksson.

The following sports clubs are located in Övertorneå:

- Övertorneå SK

== Notable residents ==
- Mathilda Fogman (1835-1921), a Swedish and Finnish midwife, was an influential spiritual leader within Laestadianism in Övertorneå.
- Brita Klemetintytär (1621-1700) lived in Övertorneå, where she followed in her father's footsteps and served as postmaster.
- Gerda Antti (1929-2026), Swedish writer and local politician, born in Övertorneå.
