= Rosvik =

- Location within Norrbotten Location within Sweden
- Coordinates: 65°25′43″N 21°41′21″E
- Country: Sweden
- Province: Norrbotten
- County: Norrbotten County
- Municipality: Piteå Municipality

Area
  - Total: 1.93 km^{2} (0.75 sq mi)

Population (31 December 2010)
  - Total: 1,735
  - Density: 900/km^{2} (2,300/sq mi)
- Time zone: UTC+1 (CET)
  - Summer (DST): UTC+2 (CEST)

Rosvik is a locality situated in Piteå Municipality, Norrbotten County, Sweden with 1,735 inhabitants in 2010.
