= Bergsviken =

- Location within Norrbotten Location within Sweden
- Coordinates: 65°18′N 21°23′E
- Country: Sweden
- Province: Norrbotten
- County: Norrbotten County
- Municipality: Piteå Municipality

Area
  - Total: 2.65 km^{2} (1.02 sq mi)

Population (31 December 2010)
  - Total: 2,283
  - Density: 863/km^{2} (2,240/sq mi)
- Time zone: UTC+1 (CET)
  - Summer (DST): UTC+2 (CEST)

Bergsviken is a locality situated in Piteå Municipality, Norrbotten County, Sweden with 2,283 inhabitants in 2010.
