= Piteå =

Place in Norrbotten, Sweden

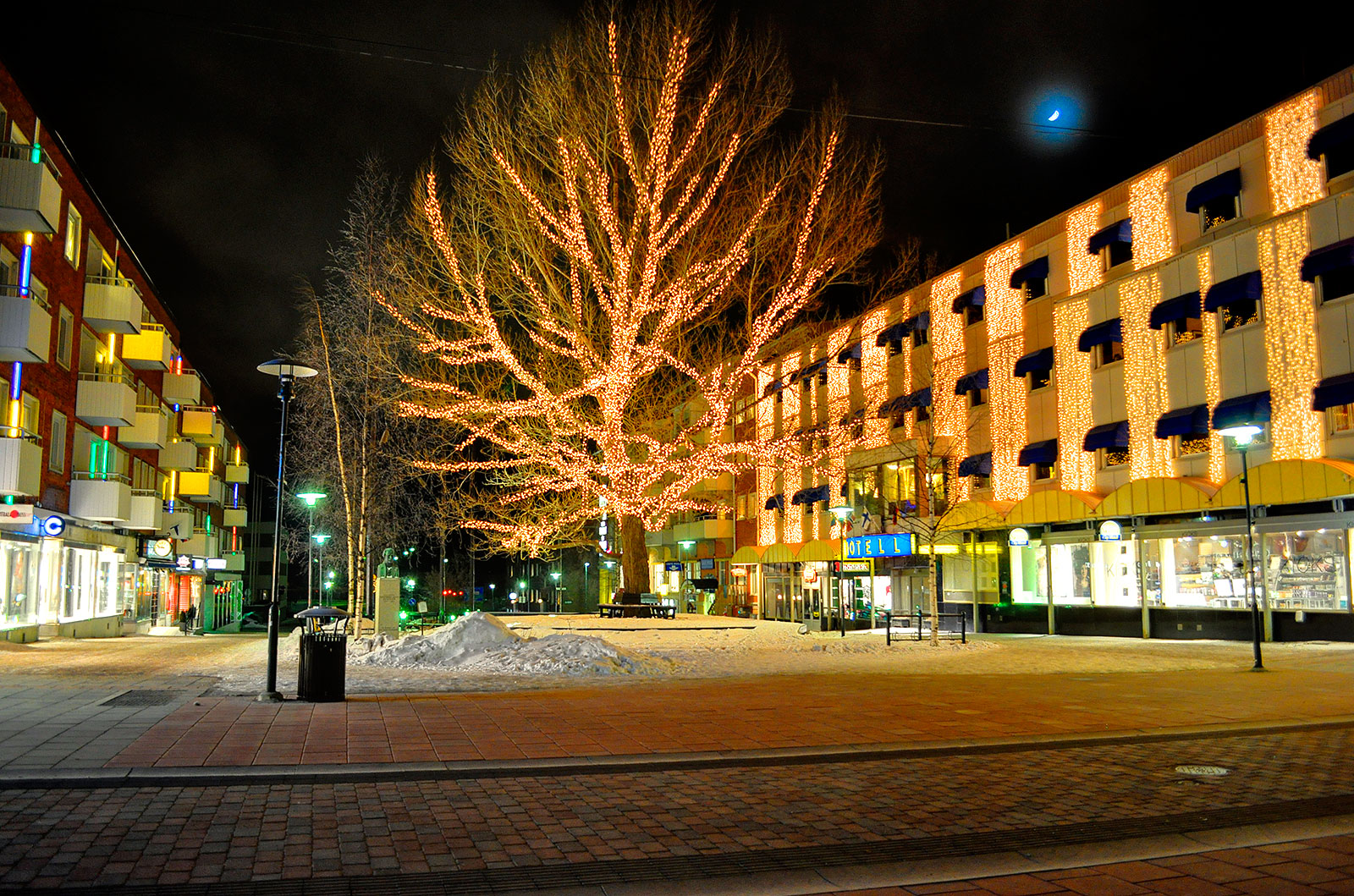
- One of the two town squares

- Location within Norrbotten Location within Sweden
- Coordinates: 65°19′00″N 21°29′00″E
- Country: Sweden
- Province: Norrbotten
- County: Norrbotten County
- Municipality: Piteå Municipality

Area
  - Total: 24.74 km^{2} (9.55 sq mi)

Population (2018)
  - Total: 23,350
  - Density: 926/km^{2} (2,400/sq mi)
- Time zone: UTC+1 (CET)
  - Summer (DST): UTC+2 (CEST)
- Website: Official website

Piteå (Swedish: [ˈpǐːtɛɔ]; Finnish: Piitime; Meänkieli: Piitin) is a locality and the seat of Piteå Municipality in Norrbotten County, Sweden. Piteå is Sweden's 58th largest city, with a population of 23,326.

== Geography ==
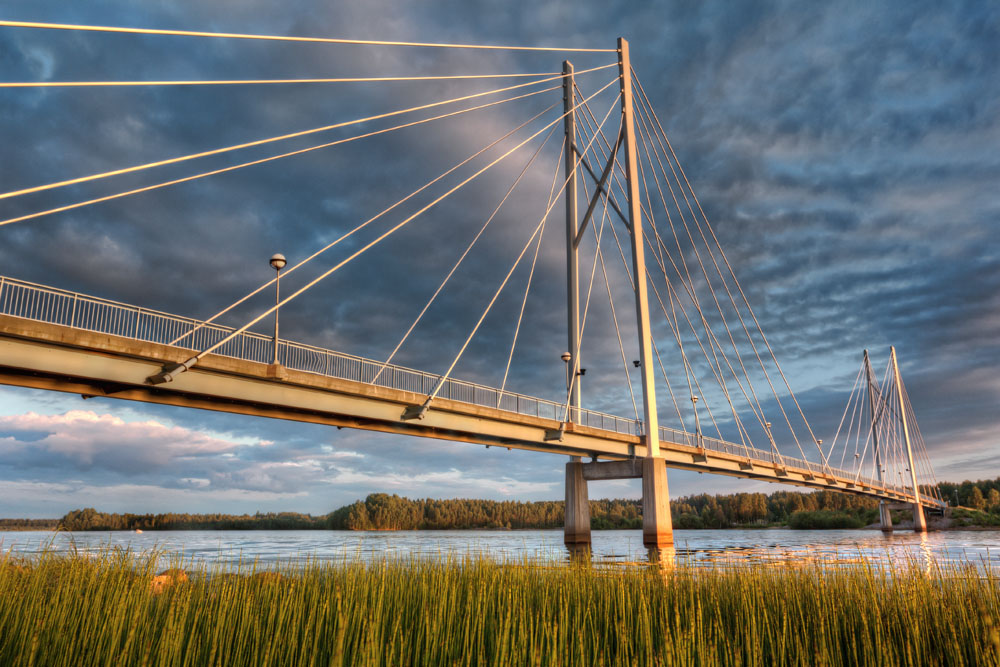
Öholmabridge between Piteå and Bergsviken

Piteå is located at the mouth of the Pite River (Swedish: Piteälven), at the shore of the Bay of Bothnia. The central part is located on an islet called Häggholmen, which due to post-glacial rebound almost has become a part of the mainland; the land in northern Sweden rises at a rate of up to 9 mm (0.35 in) per year.

Piteå's coastal location, with numerous islands and inlets, is one of the reasons it is a popular place for tourism both in summer and winter. It features a beach resort area called Pite Havsbad, around which there is a spa, a long sandy beach, a restaurant and a golf course. The area is also suitable for fishing and outdoor activities. In the winter, snow activities such as skiing and winter bathing are common. The water temperatures reportedly being Sweden's warmest during three consecutive summers in the 1950s, the beach then became known as "Norrbotten's Riviera".

== Climate ==
Piteå has a climate that is classified as subarctic climate (Köppen climate classification Dfc), bordering to a humid continental climate (Köppen climate classification Dfb).

The warmest months in Piteå are June, July, and August, with high temperatures of 17 to 30 °C (63 to 86 °F). The coldest are December, January, and February, with low temperatures of −22 to −10 °C (−8 to 14 °F).

Climate data for Piteå (2002–2022 averages), extremes since 1901
Month	Jan	Feb	Mar	Apr	May	Jun	Jul	Aug	Sep	Oct	Nov	Dec	Year
Record high °C (°F)	10.3 (50.5)	10.5 (50.9)	14.1 (57.4)	21.5 (70.7)	29.5 (85.1)	32.0 (89.6)	34.9 (94.8)	32.0 (89.6)	24.5 (76.1)	20.8 (69.4)	13.0 (55.4)	8.5 (47.3)	34.9 (94.8)
Mean maximum °C (°F)	4.5 (40.1)	6.0 (42.8)	9.9 (49.8)	14.2 (57.6)	22.5 (72.5)	25.4 (77.7)	27.2 (81.0)	25.8 (78.4)	20.4 (68.7)	13.8 (56.8)	7.6 (45.7)	5.1 (41.2)	28.4 (83.1)
Mean daily maximum °C (°F)	−4.9 (23.2)	−3.9 (25.0)	1.5 (34.7)	6.7 (44.1)	13.0 (55.4)	18.0 (64.4)	20.9 (69.6)	19.1 (66.4)	13.9 (57.0)	6.4 (43.5)	0.4 (32.7)	−2.5 (27.5)	7.4 (45.3)
Daily mean °C (°F)	−8.7 (16.3)	−8.1 (17.4)	−3.0 (26.6)	2.1 (35.8)	7.9 (46.2)	13.3 (55.9)	16.2 (61.2)	14.6 (58.3)	9.8 (49.6)	3.1 (37.6)	−2.4 (27.7)	−6.0 (21.2)	3.2 (37.8)
Mean daily minimum °C (°F)	−12.5 (9.5)	−12.3 (9.9)	−7.5 (18.5)	−2.5 (27.5)	2.8 (37.0)	8.5 (47.3)	11.5 (52.7)	10.0 (50.0)	5.6 (42.1)	−0.2 (31.6)	−5.2 (22.6)	−9.4 (15.1)	−0.9 (30.3)
Mean minimum °C (°F)	−26.5 (−15.7)	−26.0 (−14.8)	−20.7 (−5.3)	−10.2 (13.6)	−3.6 (25.5)	1.6 (34.9)	5.6 (42.1)	3.0 (37.4)	−1.7 (28.9)	−9.5 (14.9)	−15.8 (3.6)	−21.8 (−7.2)	−29.3 (−20.7)
Record low °C (°F)	−41.5 (−42.7)	−38.5 (−37.3)	−33.3 (−27.9)	−22.5 (−8.5)	−10.5 (13.1)	−1.3 (29.7)	2.5 (36.5)	−1.0 (30.2)	−6.1 (21.0)	−21.4 (−6.5)	−31.6 (−24.9)	−35.5 (−31.9)	−41.5 (−42.7)
Average precipitation mm (inches)	58.7 (2.31)	41.0 (1.61)	30.8 (1.21)	33.7 (1.33)	43.9 (1.73)	61.3 (2.41)	64.7 (2.55)	73.5 (2.89)	63.5 (2.50)	66.2 (2.61)	55.3 (2.18)	65.0 (2.56)	657.6 (25.89)
Average extreme snow depth cm (inches)	47 (19)	61 (24)	57 (22)	38 (15)	2 (0.8)	0 (0)	0 (0)	0 (0)	0 (0)	5 (2.0)	13 (5.1)	30 (12)	65 (26)
Source 1: SMHI Open Data
Source 2: SMHI Monthly Data 2002–2022

Climate data for Piteå (1991–2020 averages), extremes since 1901
Month	Jan	Feb	Mar	Apr	May	Jun	Jul	Aug	Sep	Oct	Nov	Dec	Year
Record high °C (°F)	10.3 (50.5)	10.5 (50.9)	14.1 (57.4)	21.5 (70.7)	29.5 (85.1)	32.0 (89.6)	34.9 (94.8)	32.0 (89.6)	24.5 (76.1)	20.8 (69.4)	13.0 (55.4)	8.5 (47.3)	34.9 (94.8)
Mean daily maximum °C (°F)	−4.3 (24.3)	−4.0 (24.8)	1.1 (34.0)	6.3 (43.3)	12.7 (54.9)	17.9 (64.2)	20.7 (69.3)	19.0 (66.2)	13.7 (56.7)	6.2 (43.2)	0.4 (32.7)	−2.6 (27.3)	7.3 (45.1)
Daily mean °C (°F)	−8.1 (17.4)	−8.3 (17.1)	−3.5 (25.7)	1.8 (35.2)	7.8 (46.0)	13.4 (56.1)	16.3 (61.3)	14.5 (58.1)	9.4 (48.9)	2.9 (37.2)	−2.5 (27.5)	−5.9 (21.4)	3.2 (37.7)
Mean daily minimum °C (°F)	−12.1 (10.2)	−12.5 (9.5)	−7.9 (17.8)	−2.6 (27.3)	2.7 (36.9)	8.6 (47.5)	11.6 (52.9)	10.1 (50.2)	5.5 (41.9)	−0.2 (31.6)	−5.4 (22.3)	−9.4 (15.1)	−1.0 (30.3)
Record low °C (°F)	−41.5 (−42.7)	−38.5 (−37.3)	−33.3 (−27.9)	−22.5 (−8.5)	−10.5 (13.1)	−1.3 (29.7)	2.5 (36.5)	−1.0 (30.2)	−6.1 (21.0)	−21.4 (−6.5)	−31.6 (−24.9)	−35.5 (−31.9)	−41.5 (−42.7)
Average precipitation mm (inches)	52 (2.0)	34 (1.3)	34 (1.3)	33 (1.3)	42 (1.7)	62 (2.4)	70 (2.8)	69 (2.7)	59 (2.3)	61 (2.4)	60 (2.4)	58 (2.3)	634 (24.9)
Source 1: SMHI Open Data - Temperature
Source 2: SMHI Open Data - Precipitation

== History ==
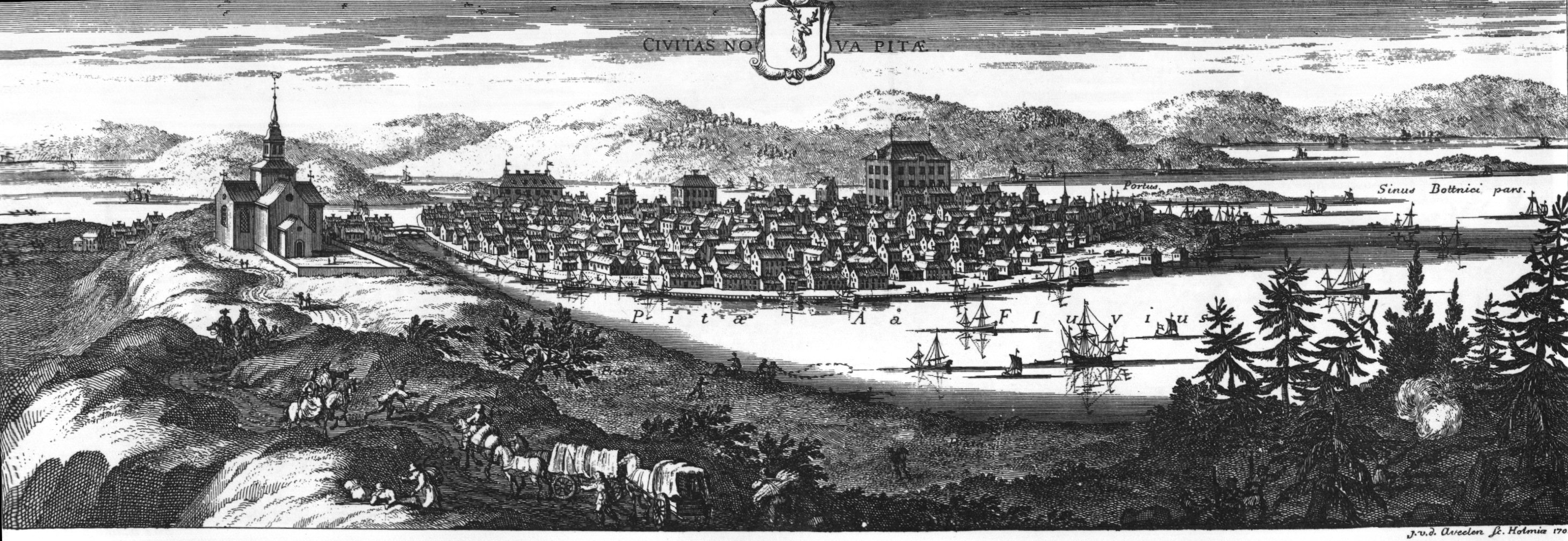
The new town of Piteå, engraving made sometime between 1690 and 1710

Piteå received its city privileges on 12 May 1621. The name Piteå comes from the Piteälven (Pite River, one of the four major rivers in Norrland). The town was originally situated slightly north of its current location, in present-day Öjebyn. In July 1666, the entire town burnt down, and over the following few years it was rebuilt on Häggholmen, a small island which forms the nucleus of present-day Piteå. In 1721, the new town was burnt down by Russian troops during the Russian Pillage of 1719-1721, and the only building that remained was the church, which is still standing.

The town square, where the town hall is located, has kept its structure from the 17th century. It is one of only two squares in Sweden with closed corners; the other one is in Uppsala.

Piteå's population has increased rapidly since the 19th century. In the years 1870–1920, Piteå had a population of only 2,500 people. Part of the early population increase is attributed to the 1911 opening of the Älvsbyn-Piteå railway branch, as well as industrial establishments and the harbour.

Piteå has traditionally had a strong forestry industry; papermills, sawmills, and its harbour are of some importance.

Since the year 2011 there is held every october 10th celebrating the new town square after it being renovated. The event is known all over northern sweden. The town square closes down every 10th of october and a shopping cart race is held. Best time wins a trophy with a big shopping cart on it. Second and third gets a giftcard on COOP which is a big food store in the city.

== Culture ==
Piteå is known for its pitepalt, a food dish consisting of potato dumplings with chopped pork filling. The area is also known for its dialect, called Pitemål, which however is mainly spoken by elders in surrounding villages.

Piteå has a fast food drive-thru commonly used by snowmobilers. The restaurant was a McDonald's from February 2002 to November 2007. Several McDonald's restaurants in Norrbotten closed at the time, in the face of competition from Max Hamburgers. The restaurant is now part of the Frasses hamburger chain. The drive-thru has received international coverage, including on The Travel Channel in an episode called "Most Unique McDonald's". 19 December 2024, McDonald's reopened in the BackCity area.

Piteå has a sister city in the Caribbean: Gustavia, capital of Saint Barthélemy, the formerly Swedish possession that is now part of France.

The School of music of Luleå University of Technology is located in Piteå.

== Cleantech ==
Piteå has emerged as an important center of cleantech production and research based on cellulose byproducts. Chemrec operates a black liquor gasifier and the world's first BioDME production facility, SunPine has pioneered a renewable diesel process technology using crude tall oil as feedstock, and ETC (Energy Technology Centre in Piteå) is a research and development center for renewable fuels with focus on combustion, gasification and biorefining processes.

== Sport ==
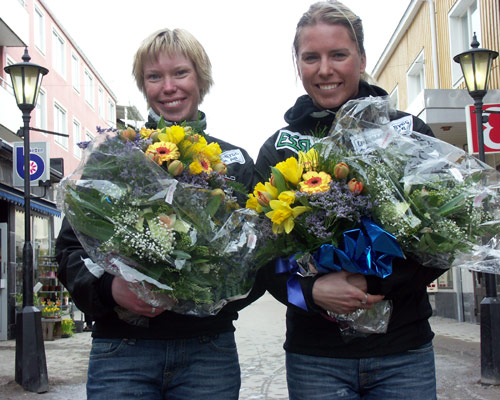
Lina Andersson (left) and Emelie Öhrstig celebrate in Piteå following the FIS Nordic World Ski Championships 2005.

The Piteå IF football team is playing in the fourth highest Swedish division, Division 2 for men; and the Piteå IF ladies team in 2009 for their first time played in the highest league in football but was relegated the same season. However, they returned in 2011 to Damallsvenskan, which they then in 2018 won.

Ice hockey is the big sport in town, even though Piteå HC only plays in the third-highest League (Division I) in Sweden. The club has provided players to the NHL and national team, including Tomas Holmström, Mikael Renberg, Mattias Öhlund, Lars Lindgren, Stefan Persson, Jan Sandström and Mats Lavander. Munksund-Skuthamns SK ladies team is, for their first time, playing in the highest league in Hockey, Riksserien. Rebecka Stenberg became the first woman from Piteå to play for the Swedish national team.

In cross-country skiing the town has a club called Piteå Elit, with professional skier members including Lina Andersson, Magdalena Pajala and Charlotte Kalla.

The town has a competitive swimming team called Piteå Sim which is famous all over Norrland especially Norrbotten. In 2018, then-13-year-old club member Heidi Nilsson won first place in the Junior, Senior and Ladies category in the Piteå Kanalsimmet which takes place every year on Valborgsmässoafton.

Other sports clubs located in Piteå include Storfors AIK, MSSK and the northern paintball team 'Team X-rated'.

== Notable people ==
- Christopher Jacob Boström — Swedish philosopher
- Nils Edén — Swedish historian and liberal politician who served as Prime Minister of Sweden from 1917-1920
- Tomas Holmström — retired former NHL player (with the Detroit Red Wings)
- Bengt G. Karlsson — Swedish anthropologist
- Lars Lindgren — retired former NHL player
- Nils Lundqvist — defenseman with the Dallas Stars
- Anna Magnusson — Swedish biathlete
- Liza Marklund — Swedish journalist and crime writer
- Peter Mattei — Swedish baritone opera singer
- Mattias Öhlund — NHL player with the Vancouver Canucks
- Mikael Renberg — retired former NHL player
- Daniel Solander — Explorer

== International relations ==
=== Twin towns – Sister cities ===
Piteå is twinned with:

- Kandalaksha, Russia (Paused due to the Russian invasion of Ukraine)
- Grindavík, Iceland
- Gustavia, Saint Barthélemy, France
