= Böle, Piteå Municipality =

Böle
- Location within Norrbotten Location within Sweden
- Coordinates: 65°23′N 21°19′E
- Country: Sweden
- Province: Norrbotten
- County: Norrbotten County
- Municipality: Piteå Municipality

Area
  - Total: 0.94 km^{2} (0.36 sq mi)

Population (31 December 2010)
  - Total: 424
  - Density: 451/km^{2} (1,170/sq mi)
- Time zone: UTC+1 (CET)
  - Summer (DST): UTC+2 (CEST)

Böle is a locality situated in Piteå Municipality, Norrbotten County, Sweden with 424 inhabitants in 2010.
