= Brita Klemetintytär =

Finnish postmaster

Brita Klemetintytär (1621–1700) was a Finnish woman postmaster.

As the daughter of the former postmaster of Torneå in Swedish Finland, she was appointed to succeed him by the local authorities upon his death. This was highly unusual for her time: though female postmasters were fairly common in Sweden (with Finland), they were normally widows of the former postmasters, not daughters, which makes her position unique.
