= Piteå Municipality =

Piteå Municipality Piteå kommun
- Municipality
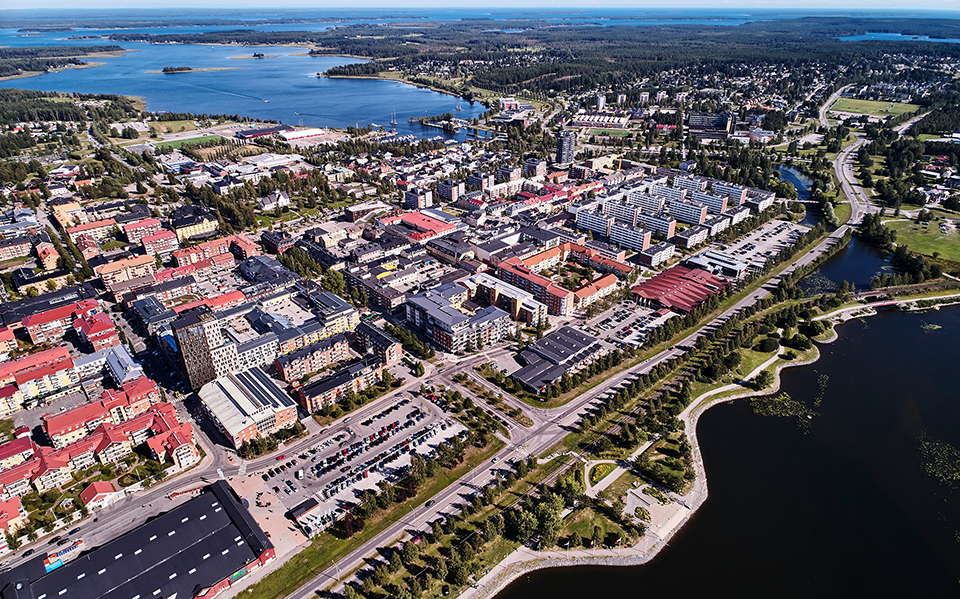

- Coat of arms

- Coordinates: 65°20′N 21°30′E
- Country: Sweden
- County: Norrbotten County
- Seat: Piteå

Area
  - Total: 4,680.52 km^{2} (1,807.16 sq mi)
  - Land: 3,086.95 km^{2} (1,191.88 sq mi)
  - Water: 1,593.57 km^{2} (615.28 sq mi)
- Area as of 1 January 2014.

Population (30 June 2025)
  - Total: 42,308
  - Density: 13.705/km^{2} (35.497/sq mi)
- Time zone: UTC+1 (CET)
  - Summer (DST): UTC+2 (CEST)
- ISO 3166 code: SE
- Province: Norrbotten
- Municipal code: 2581
- Website: www.pitea.se

Piteå Municipality (Swedish: Piteå kommun; Finnish: Piitimen kunta) is a municipality in Norrbotten County in northern Sweden. Its seat is located in Piteå.

== Localities ==
There are 14 localities (or urban areas) in Piteå Municipality:

#	Locality	Population
1	**Piteå**	22,650
2	Bergsviken	2,317
3	Rosvik	1,766
4	Norrfjärden	1,423
5	Hortlax	1,247
6	Roknäs	1,242
7	Jävre	572
8	Lillpite	454
9	Böle	418
10	Hemmingsmark	398
11	Sjulsmark	369
12	Svensbyn	362
13	Blåsmark	332
14	Sikfors	211

The municipal seat in bold

== Demographics ==
This is a demographic table based on Piteå Municipality's electoral districts in the 2022 Swedish general election sourced from SVT's election platform, in turn taken from SCB official statistics.

In total there were 42,282 residents, including 33,405 Swedish citizens of voting age. 63.9% voted for the left coalition and 35.0% for the right coalition. Indicators are in percentage points except population totals and income.

Location	Residents	Citizen adults	Left vote	Right vote	Employed	Swedish parents	Foreign heritage	Income SEK	Degree
Location			%	%					
Backen Annelund	1,891	1,444	66.1	33.3	86	90	10	27,146	39
Backen Källbo	1,824	1,603	64.9	33.9	84	89	11	23,899	37
Bergsviken V	1,417	1,078	65.5	33.7	88	95	5	29,339	39
Bergsviken Ö	1,138	910	64.4	34.8	88	96	4	29,878	44
Blåsmark	968	727	70.2	29.3	89	96	4	27,716	33
Djupviken N	2,046	1,608	66.7	32.2	71	88	12	23,353	49
Djupviken S	1,804	1,358	65.8	33.6	87	92	8	30,681	50
Hortlax	2,002	1,507	61.1	38.0	90	96	4	28,773	39
Häggholmen V	1,783	1,583	68.9	30.2	77	88	12	21,053	31
Häggholmen Ö	1,613	1,499	76.8	22.0	65	88	12	18,462	31
Jävre	1,026	807	64.7	34.3	88	95	5	27,839	39
Klubbgärdet	1,466	1,167	59.8	38.8	84	92	8	28,845	39
Munksund N	1,675	1,331	65.6	34.0	81	93	7	26,146	37
Munksund S	1,596	1,289	60.1	39.0	87	92	8	29,291	35
Norrmalm	849	746	68.4	30.6	81	91	9	24,826	39
Pitholm	1,705	1,352	66.4	32.6	86	93	7	31,032	47
Porsnäs V	1,199	879	61.5	36.9	86	92	8	25,800	36
Porsnäs Ö	1,301	1,029	62.5	36.2	91	97	3	29,044	44
Roknäs Lillpite	1,734	1,416	60.1	38.1	82	94	6	24,998	27
Rosvik	2,161	1,592	55.3	43.9	85	90	10	26,408	36
Sjulnäs Böle	1,772	1,313	63.1	35.0	90	97	3	29,512	34
Sjulsmark	1,759	1,372	57.0	40.8	85	95	5	26,567	32
Strömnäs	1,620	1,241	60.7	38.6	84	90	10	29,709	51
Svensbyn	938	738	66.8	32.9	86	97	3	29,726	37
Öjebyn C	1,263	912	66.4	32.2	68	85	15	22,030	26
Öjebyn N	1,948	1,479	64.3	34.7	76	87	13	23,049	30
Öjebyn S	1,784	1,425	66.3	32.8	77	90	10	25,039	28
Source: SVT

== Twin towns – sister cities ==
Piteå is twinned with:

- Grindavík, Iceland
- Kandalaksha, Russia (Paused due to the Russian invasion of Ukraine)
- Saint Barthélemy, France

== Notable natives ==
- Lina Andersson, cross-country skier
- Christopher Jacob Boström, philosopher
- Curt Boström, politician
- Moki Cherry, artist
- Nicolai Dunger, artist
- Nils Edén, politician
- Tomas Holmström, ice hockey player
- Niklas Jonsson, cross-country skier
- Liza Marklund, author
- Peter Mattei, opera singer
- Stefan Persson, ice hockey player
- Mikael Renberg, ice hockey player
- Daniel Solander, botanist
- Mattias Öhlund, ice hockey player

== See also ==
- List of islands of the Piteå archipelago
- Gråträsk
