= Sámi people =

Indigenous people of Northern Europe

Sámi
sámit (Northern Sámi) saemieh (Southern Sámi) sáme (Lule and Pite Sámi) sämmiliih (Inari Sámi) säʹmmla (Skolt Sámi) са̄мь (Kildin Sámi)
- Sámi flag

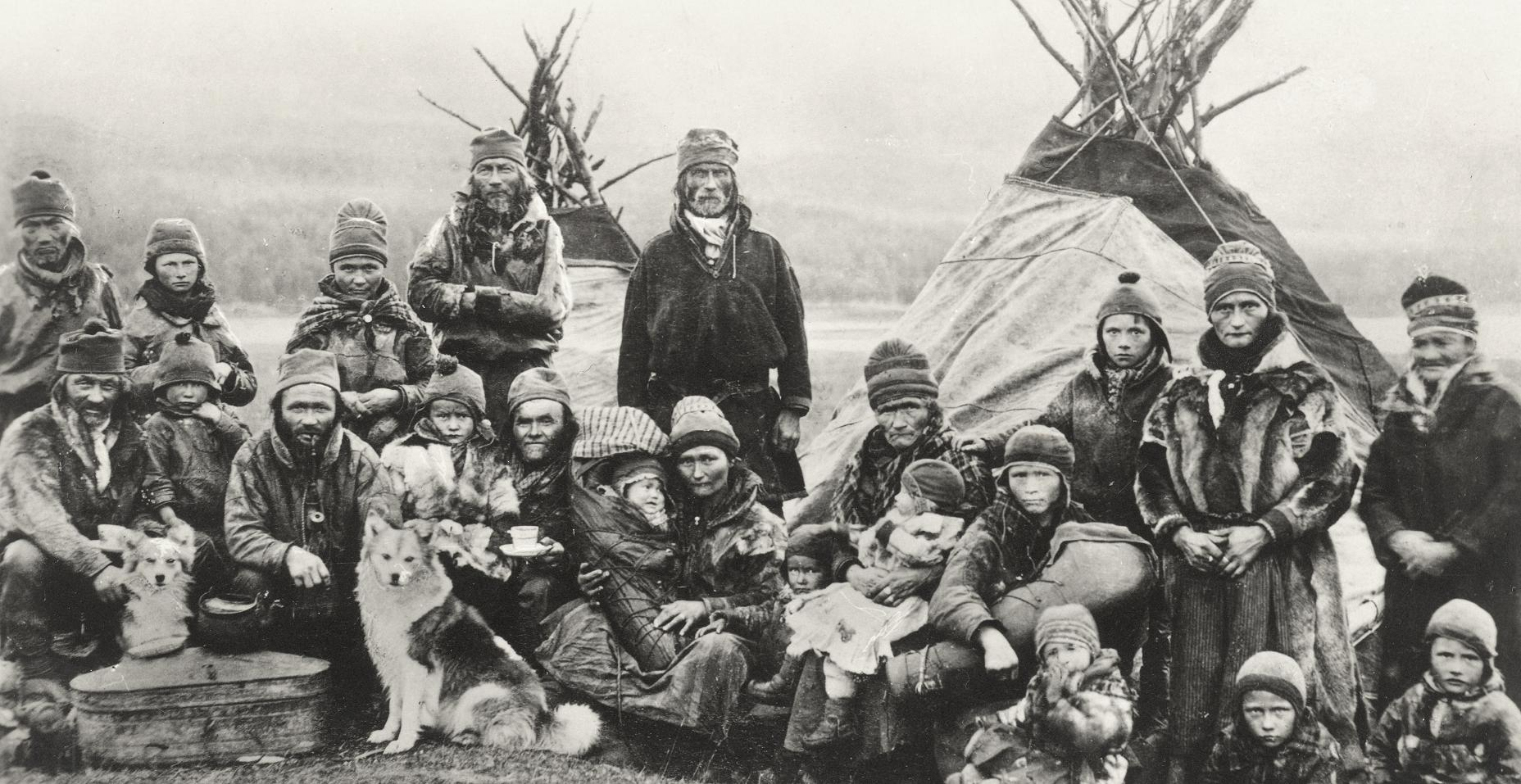
- Sámi outside a lavvu, c. 1910

Total population
- Estimated 80,000

Regions with significant populations
- Sápmi 63,831–107,341
- Norway: 37,890–60,000 (Note: In Norway, there is no clear legal definition of who is Sámi. Therefore, exact numbers are not possible.)
- Sweden: 14,600–36,000
- Finland: 9,350
- Russia: 1,530
- United States: 480 (first ancestry); 945 (first and second)
- Ukraine: 136 (2001)

Languages
- Sámi languages (Akkala, Inari, Kildin, Kemi, Lule, Northern, Pite, Skolt, Ter, Southern, Ume); Russian, Norwegian, Swedish, Finnish

Religion
- Sámi shamanism Christianity (Lutheranism, including Laestadianism, Eastern Orthodoxy)

The Sámi (US: /ˈsɑːmi/ SAH-mee, UK: also /ˈsæmi/ SAM-ee; also spelled Sami or Saami) are the traditionally Sámi-speaking indigenous people inhabiting the region of Sápmi. Formerly known as Lapland, Sápmi encompasses large northern parts of Norway, Sweden, and Finland, and of the Kola Peninsula in Russia. Historically, the Sámi have been known in English as Lapps or Laplanders; however, these terms are exonyms, regarded as offensive by some Sámi, who prefer their own endonym. Their traditional languages are the Sámi languages, which are classified as a branch of the Uralic language family.

Traditionally, the Sámi have pursued a variety of livelihoods, including coastal fishing, fur trapping, and sheep herding. Their best-known means of livelihood is semi-nomadic reindeer herding. As of 2007, about 10% of Sámi were connected to reindeer herding, which provides them with meat, fur, and transportation; around 2,800 Sámi people were actively involved in reindeer herding on a full-time basis in Norway. For traditional, environmental, cultural, and political reasons, reindeer herding is legally reserved for only Sámi in some regions of the Nordic countries.

== Etymologies ==
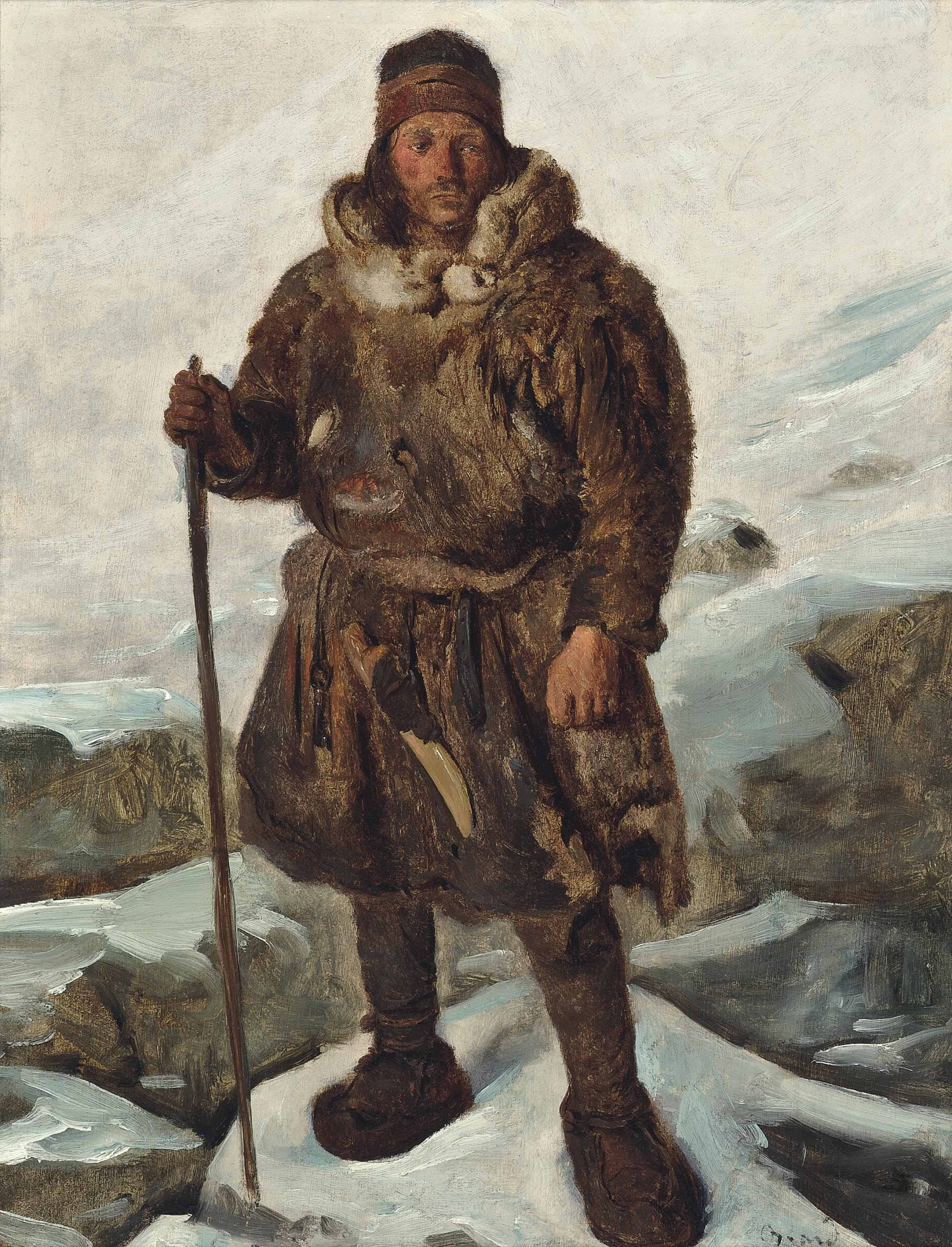
A Sámi man depicted in art, painting by François-Auguste Biard

=== Sámi ===
Speakers of Northern Sámi refer to themselves as Sámit "the Sámis" or Sápmelaš "of Sámi kin," the word Sápmi being inflected into various grammatical forms. Other Sámi languages use cognate words. As of approximately 2014, the consensus among specialists was that the word Sámi was borrowed from the Proto-Baltic word *žēmē, "land," cognate with Slavic zemlja (земля), of the same meaning. Both terms ultimately descend from the Proto-Indo-European root *dʰéǵʰōm.

The word Sámi has at least one cognate in Finnish: Proto-Baltic *žēmē was also borrowed into Proto-Finnic as *šämä and evolved into modern Finnish Häme, the region of Tavastia. The second ä of *šämä is still found in the adjective hämäläinen. The Finnish word for Finland, Suomi, is also thought probably to derive ultimately from Proto-Baltic *žēmē, though the precise route is debated and proposals usually involve complex processes of borrowing and reborrowing. Suomi and its adjectival form suomalainen must come from *sōme-/sōma-. Finnish linguist Grünthali Riho [fi] proposes that this Finnish root comes from a Proto-Germanic word *sōma-, itself from Proto-Baltic *sāma-, in turn borrowed from Proto-Finnic *šämä, which was borrowed from *žēmē.

Sámi institutions—notably the parliaments, radio and TV stations, theatres, etc.—all use the term Sámi, including when addressing outsiders in Norwegian, Swedish, Finnish, or English. In Norwegian and Swedish, the Sámi are referred to by the localized form same, plural samer.

=== Finn ===
The first probable historical mention of the Sámi, naming them Fenni, was by Tacitus about AD 98. Variants of Finn or Fenni were in wide use in ancient times, judging from the names Fenni and Φίννοι (Phinnoi) in classical Roman and Greek works. Finn (or variants, such as skridfinn, 'skiing Finn') was the name originally used by Norse speakers (and their proto-Norse speaking ancestors) to refer to the Sámi, as attested in the Icelandic Eddas and Norse sagas (11th to 14th centuries).

The etymology is somewhat uncertain, but the consensus seems to be that it is related to Old Norse finna, from proto-Germanic *finþanan ('to find'), the logic being that the Sámi, as hunter–gatherers, "found" their food, rather than grew it. This etymology has superseded older speculations that the word might be related to fen.

As Old Norse gradually developed into the separate Scandinavian languages, Swedes apparently took to using Finn to refer to inhabitants of what is now Finland, while the Sámi came to be called Lapps. In Norway, however, Sámi were still called Finns at least until the modern era (reflected in toponyms like Finnmark, Finnsnes, Finnfjord and Finnøy), and some northern Norwegians will still occasionally use Finn to refer to Sámi people, although the Sámi themselves now consider this to be an inappropriate term. Finnish immigrants to Northern Norway in the 18th and 19th centuries were referred to as Kvens to distinguish them from the Sámi "Finns." Ethnic Finns (suomalaiset) are a group related to the Sámi, but distinct from them.

=== Lapp ===
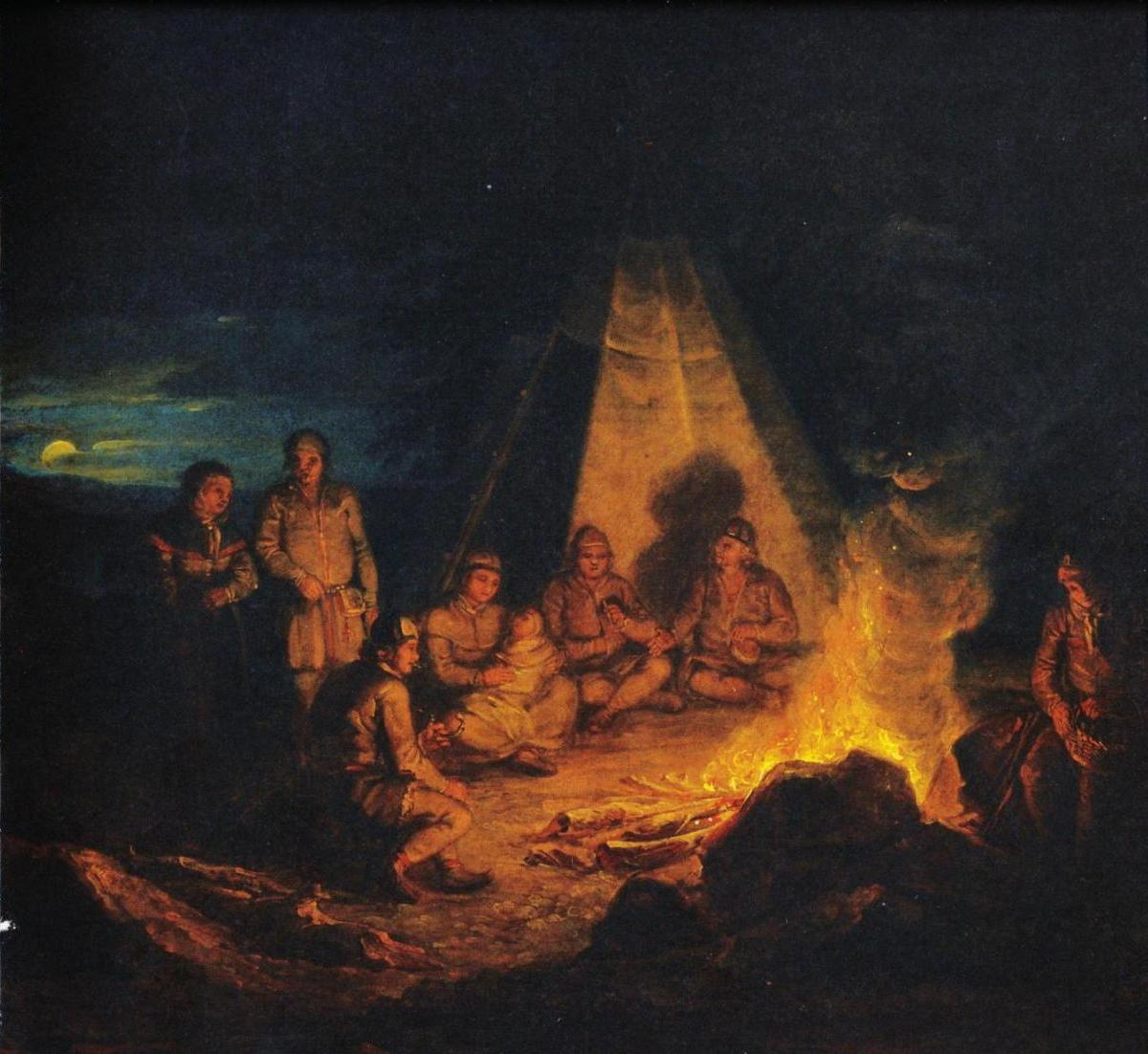
Aleksander Lauréus's painting of the Sámi by the fire

The word Lapp can be traced to Old Swedish lapper, Icelandic lappir (plural) perhaps of Finnish origin; compare Finnish lappalainen "Lapp," Lappi "Lapland" (possibly meaning "wilderness in the north"), the original meaning being unknown. It is unknown how the word Lapp came into the Norse language, but one of the first written mentions of the term is in the Gesta Danorum by the twelfth-century Danish historian Saxo Grammaticus, who referred to 'the two Lappias', although he still referred to the Sámi as (Skrid-)Finns. In fact, Saxo never explicitly connects the Sámi with the "two Laplands". The term "Lapp" was popularized and became the standard terminology by the work of Johannes Schefferus, Lapponia (1673).

The Sámi are often known in other languages by the exonyms Lap, Lapp, or Laplanders, although these are considered derogatory terms by some, while others accept at least the name Lappland. Variants of the name Lapp were originally used in Sweden and Finland and, through Swedish, adopted by many major European languages: English: Lapps; German, Dutch: Lappen; French: Lapons; Greek: Λάπωνες (Lápōnes); Hungarian: lappok; Italian: Lapponi; Polish: Lapończycy; Portuguese: Lapões; Spanish: Lapones; Romanian: laponi; Turkish: Lapon. In Russian the corresponding term is лопари́ (lopari) and in Ukrainian лопарі́ (lopari).

In Finland and Sweden, Lapp is common in place names, such as Lappi (Satakunta), Lappeenranta (South Karelia) and Lapinlahti (North Savo) in Finland; and Lapp (Stockholm County), Lappe (Södermanland) and Lappabo (Småland) in Sweden. As already mentioned, Finn is a common element in Norwegian (particularly Northern Norwegian) place names, whereas Lapp is exceedingly rare.

Terminological issues in Finnish are somewhat different. Finns living in Finnish Lapland generally call themselves lappilainen, whereas the similar word for the Sámi people is lappalainen. This can be confusing for foreign visitors because of the similar lives Finns and Sámi people live in Lapland. Lappalainen is also a common family name in Finland. In Finnish, saamelainen is the most commonly used word nowadays, especially in official contexts.

== History ==
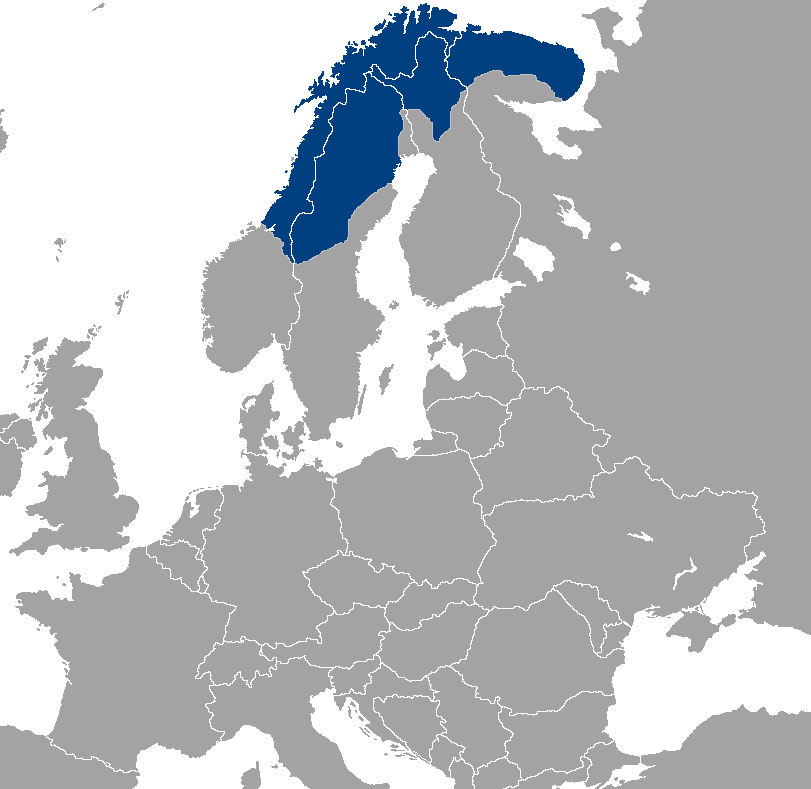
A partial map of Northern Europe highlighting Sápmi, the traditional Sámi homeland, which spans northern Norway, Sweden, and Finland as well as a portion of the Kola Peninsula in Russia.

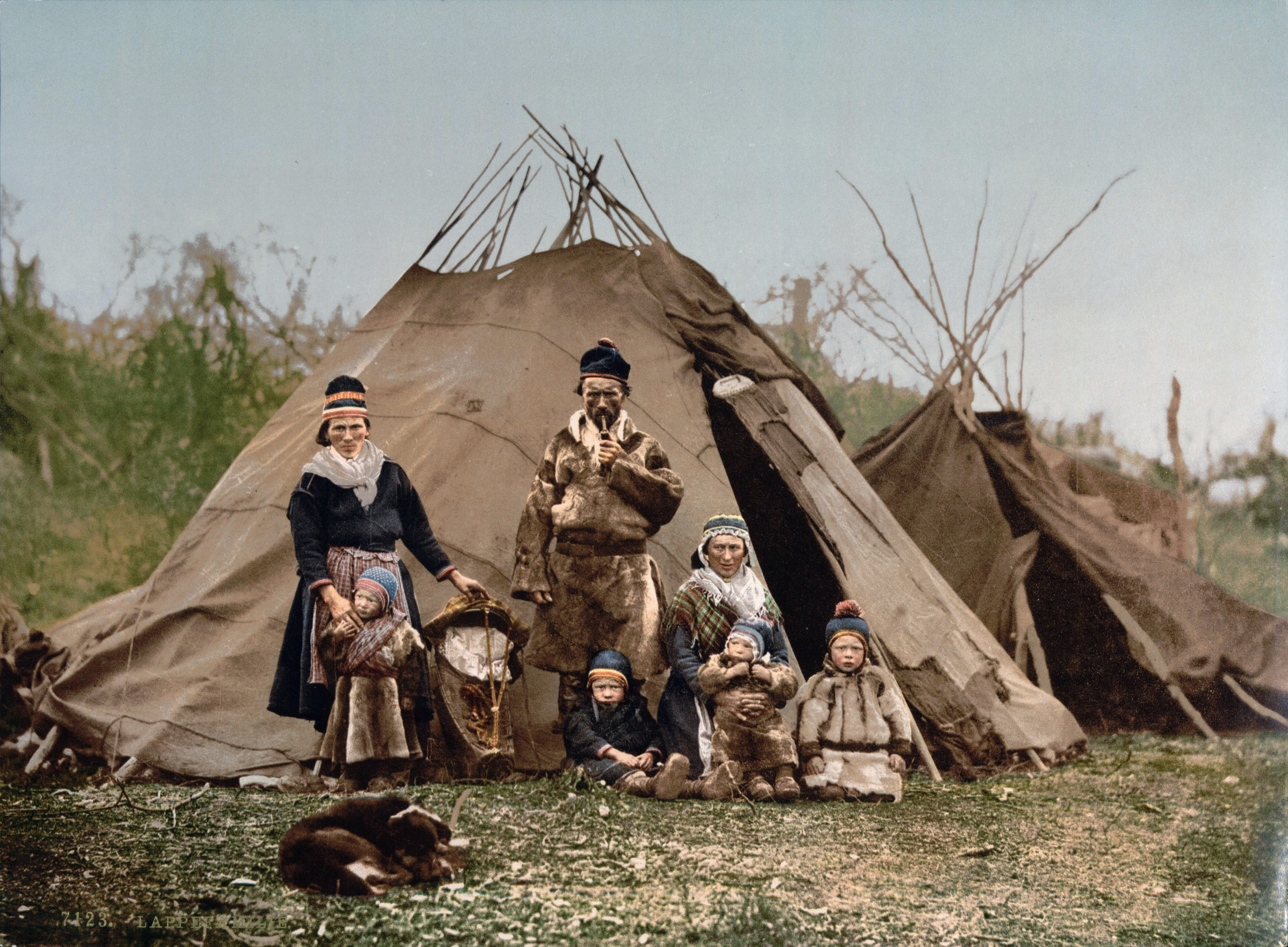
A Sámi family in Norway around 1900

The western Uralic languages are believed to have spread from the original Proto-Uralic homeland along the Volga, which is the longest river in Europe. These groups presumably started to move to the northwest from the homeland of the early Uralic peoples in the second and third quarters of the 2nd millennium BC. On their journey, they used the ancient river routes in the area that became known as northern Russia. Some of these peoples, who may have originally spoken the same western Uralic language, stopped and stayed in the regions between Karelia, Ladoga and Lake Ilmen, and even further to the east and to the southeast. The groups of these peoples that ended up in the Finnish Lakeland from 1600 to 1500 BC later "became" the Sámi. The Sámi people arrived in Sápmi sometime during the Bronze Age or early Iron Age (2nd and 1st millennia BCE).

The Sámi language first developed on the southern side of Lake Onega and Lake Ladoga and spread from there. When the speakers of this language extended to the area of modern-day Finland, they encountered groups of peoples who spoke a number of smaller ancient languages (Paleo-Laplandic languages), which later became extinct. However, these languages left traces in the Sámi language (Pre-Finnic substrate). As the language spread further, it became segmented into dialects. The geographical distribution of the Sámi has evolved over the course of history. From the Bronze Age, the Sámi occupied the area along the coast of Finnmark and the Kola Peninsula. This coincides with the arrival of the Siberian genome to Estonia and Finland, which may correspond with the introduction of the Finno-Ugric languages in the region.

Petroglyphs and archeological findings such as settlements, dating from about 10,000 BC can be found in Lapland and Finnmark, although these have not been demonstrated to be related to the Sámi people. These hunter–gatherers of the late Paleolithic and early Mesolithic were named Komsa by the researchers.

=== Relationship between the Sámi and the Scandinavians ===
The Sámi have a complex relationship with the Scandinavians (known as Norse people in the medieval era), the dominant peoples of Scandinavia, who speak Scandinavian languages and who founded and thus dominated the kingdoms of Norway and Sweden. The migration of Germanic-speaking peoples to Southern Scandinavia happened independently and separately from the Sámi migrations into the northern regions. For centuries, the Sámi and the Scandinavians had relatively little contact; the Sámi primarily lived in the inland of northern Fennoscandia, while Scandinavians lived in southern Scandinavia and gradually colonised the Norwegian coast; from the 18th and especially the 19th century, the governments of Norway and Sweden started to assert sovereignty more aggressively in the north, and targeted the Sámi with Scandinavization policies aimed at forced assimilation from the 19th century.

Before the era of forced Scandinavization policies, the Norwegian and Swedish authorities had largely ignored the Sámi and did not interfere much in their way of life. While Norwegians moved north to gradually colonise the coast of modern-day Troms and Finnmark to engage in an export-driven fisheries industry prior to the 19th century, they showed little interest in the harsh and non-arable inland populated by reindeer-herding Sámi. Unlike the Norwegians on the coast who were strongly dependent on their trade with the south, the Sámi in the inland lived off the land. From the 19th century Norwegian and Swedish authorities started to regard the Sámi as a "backward" and "primitive" people in need of being "civilized", imposing the Scandinavian languages as the only valid languages of the kingdoms and effectively banning Sámi language and culture in many contexts, particularly schools.

=== Southern limits of Sámi settlement in the past ===
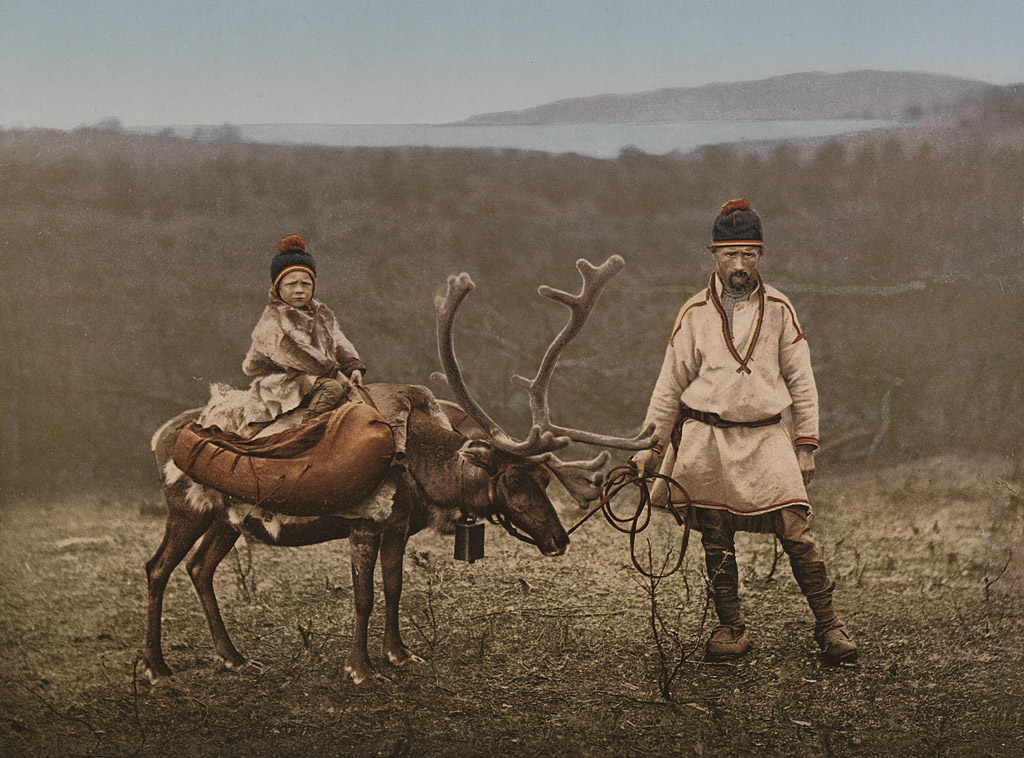
A Sámi man and child in Finnmark, Norway, c. 1900

How far south the Sámi extended in the past has been debated among historians and archeologists for many years. The Norwegian historian Yngvar Nielsen, commissioned by the Norwegian government in 1889 to determine this question in order to settle contemporary questions of Sámi land rights, concluded that the Sámi had lived no farther south than Lierne Municipality in Trøndelag county until around 1500, when they started moving south, reaching the area around Lake Femund in the 18th century. This hypothesis is still accepted among many historians, but has been the subject of scholarly debate in the 21st century. In recent years, several archaeological finds indicate a Sámi presence in southern Norway in the Middle Ages, and in southern Sweden, including finds in Lesja Municipality, in Vang Municipality, in Valdres and in Hol Municipality and Ål Municipality in Hallingdal. Proponents of the Sámi interpretations of these finds assume a mixed population of Norse and Sámi people in the mountainous areas of southern Norway in the Middle Ages.

In Finland, a 2022 study said that Sámi habitation was found in the entirety of continental Finland at least until the 14th century. Toponyms of Sámi origin are common in the southernmost provinces of Finland Proper and Uusimaa. Etymologies based on Sámi names have been suggested for Aurajoki and Nuuksio. The Sámi coexisted with Finns and Swedes and traded squirrel furs with them. The division was based on occupation: unlike Finns and Swedes, the Sámi did not engage in significant agriculture, relying on fishing, hunting, gathering and fur trapping instead. Complete colonization of the two provinces by Finns and Swedes led to the assimilation and disappearance of a distinct Sámi population by the 14th century.

=== Origins of the Norwegian Sea Sámi ===
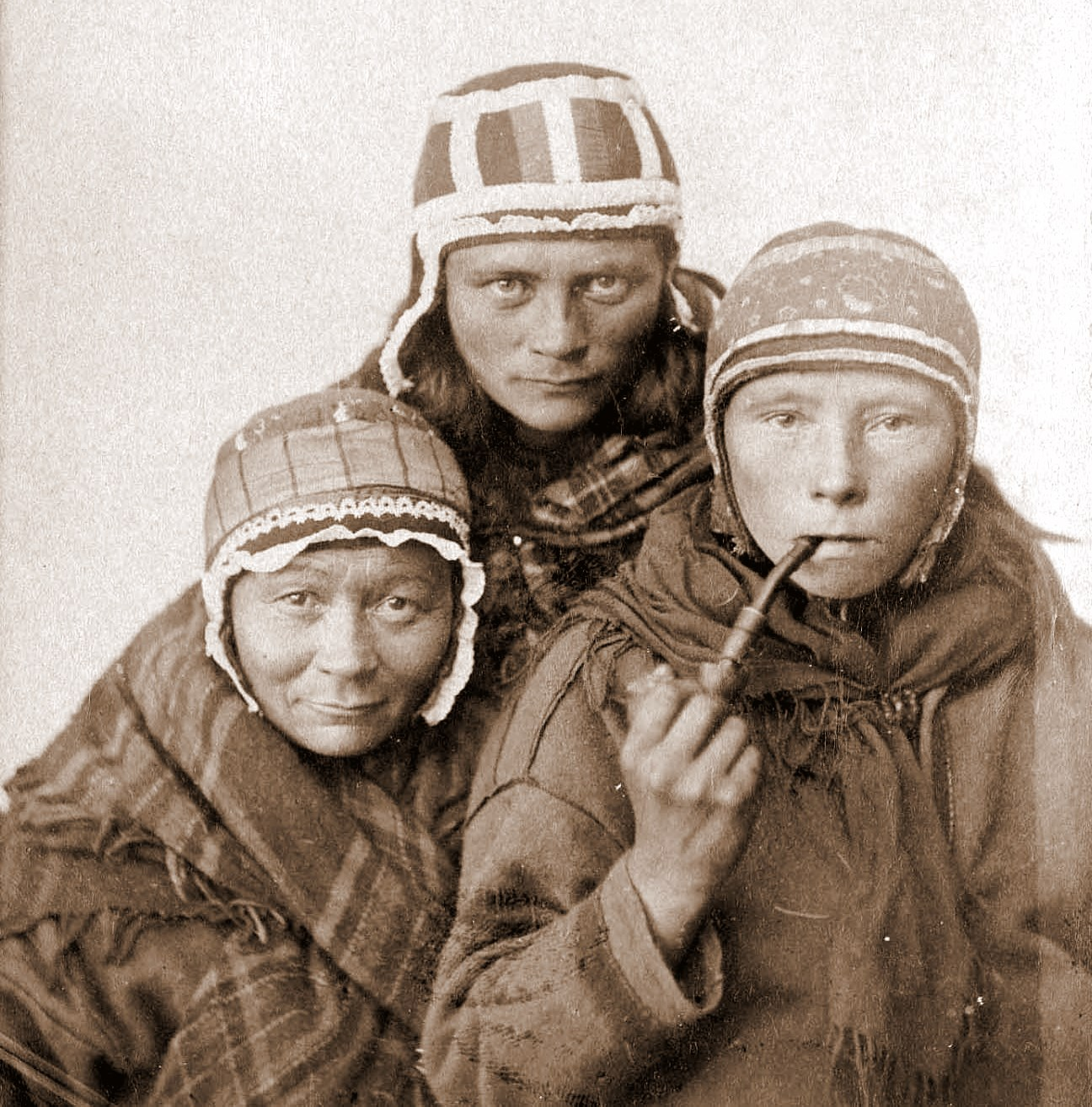
Three Sámi women

==== Bubonic plague ====
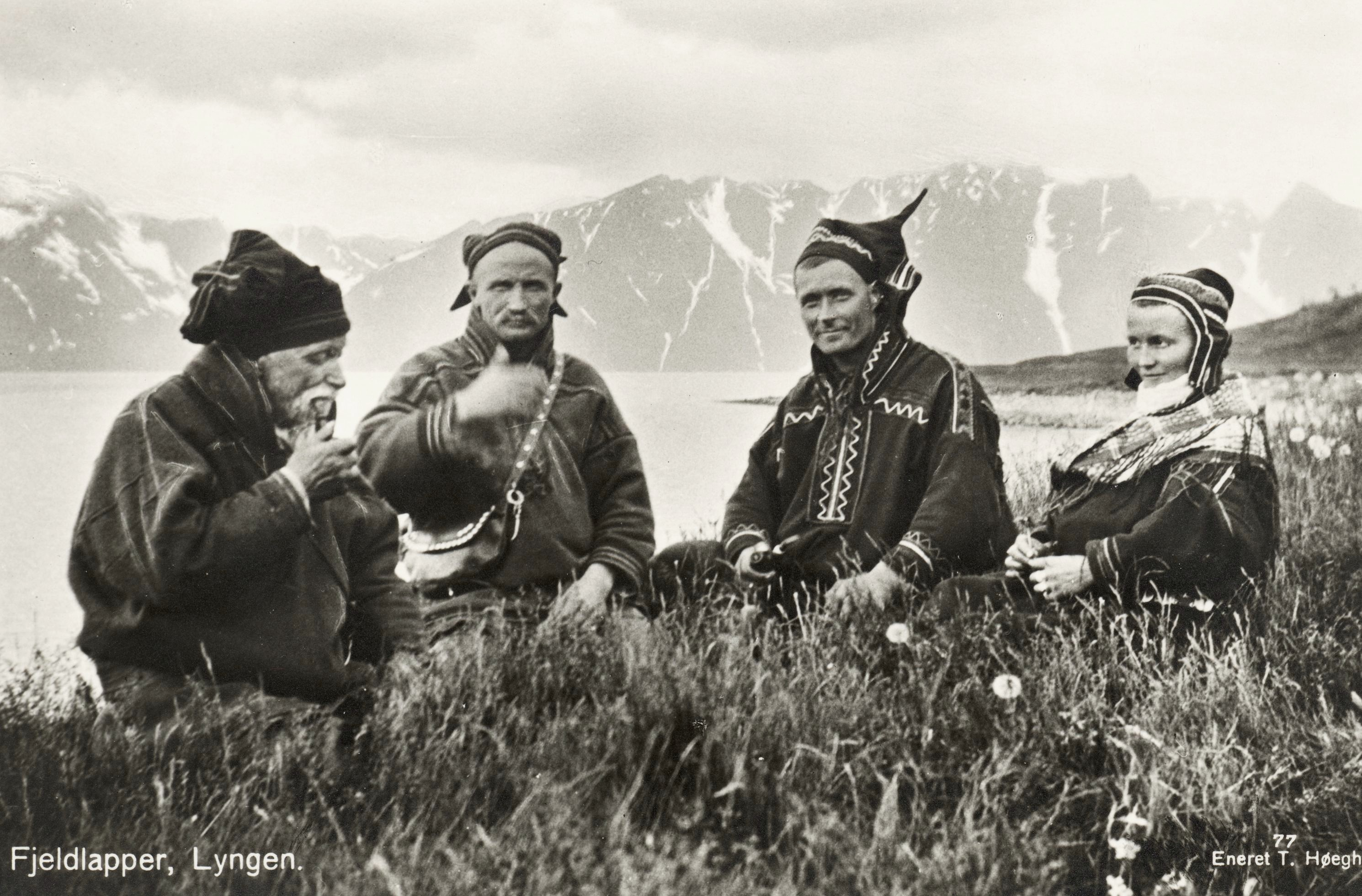
Sámi people in Norway, 1928

Until the arrival of bubonic plague in northern Norway in 1349, the Sámi and the Norwegians occupied very separate economic niches. The Sámi managed large herds of reindeer or fished along the fjords for their livelihood. The Norwegians, who were concentrated on the outer islands and near the mouths of the fjords, had access to the major European trade routes so that, in addition to marginal farming in the Nordland, Troms, and Finnmark counties, they were able to establish commerce, trading fish for products from the south. According to old Nordic texts, the Sea Sámi and the Mountain Sámi are two classes of the same people and not two different ethnic groups, as had been erroneously believed.

This socioeconomic balance greatly changed when bubonic plague came to northern Norway in December 1349. The Norwegians were closely connected to the greater European trade routes, along which the plague traveled; consequently, they were infected and died at a far higher rate than Sámi in the interior. Of all the states in the region, Norway suffered the most from this plague. Depending on the parish, 60 to 76 percent of northern Norwegian farms were abandoned following the plague, while land-rents, another measure of population, dropped to 9–28% of pre-plague levels. Although the population of northern Norway is sparse compared to southern Europe, the disease spread just as fast. The spread of the plague-carrying flea (Xenopsylla cheopsis) from the south was facilitated by the transport of wooden barrels holding wheat, rye, or wool, where the fleas were able to live, and even reproduce, for several months at a time. The Sámi lived on fish and reindeer meat, and did not eat wheat or rye. They lived in communities detached from the Norwegians; being only loosely connected to the European trade routes, they fared far better than the Norwegians.

==== Indigenous fishing practices ====
Traditionally fishing for the Sámi was done locally on a small scale. Who could fish depended on the fisher's locality to the sea and their knowledge of the landscape. Fishermen would use common fishing grounds and would have their own personal and secret spots. To navigate to these spots, they did so by naming the spot topographically, relating to coastal landmarks and the landscape of the seafloor. Fishermen were able to catch through a knowledge of the local coastal terrain, the landscape of the sea floor, and their ability to predict the tides and fish based on the season. Such knowledge was learned generationally:

"To make a living from fishing in the fjord, you are quite dependent on the knowledge passed on from the earlier generations about what species of fish can be exploited here, tidal currents, fishing spots, how to place nets and so on. This is often a matter of accurate calculation. In periods with a short supply of fish, this kind of knowledge becomes even more important. The young are not interested in learning these things, they depend on the sonar technology, but they don't last very long as fishermen."

The indigenous knowledge was lost due to immense stigma placed on Sami language(s) and practices, the replacing of indigenous place names, and the compulsory adoption of Norwegian/European fishing techniques.

==== Fishing industry ====
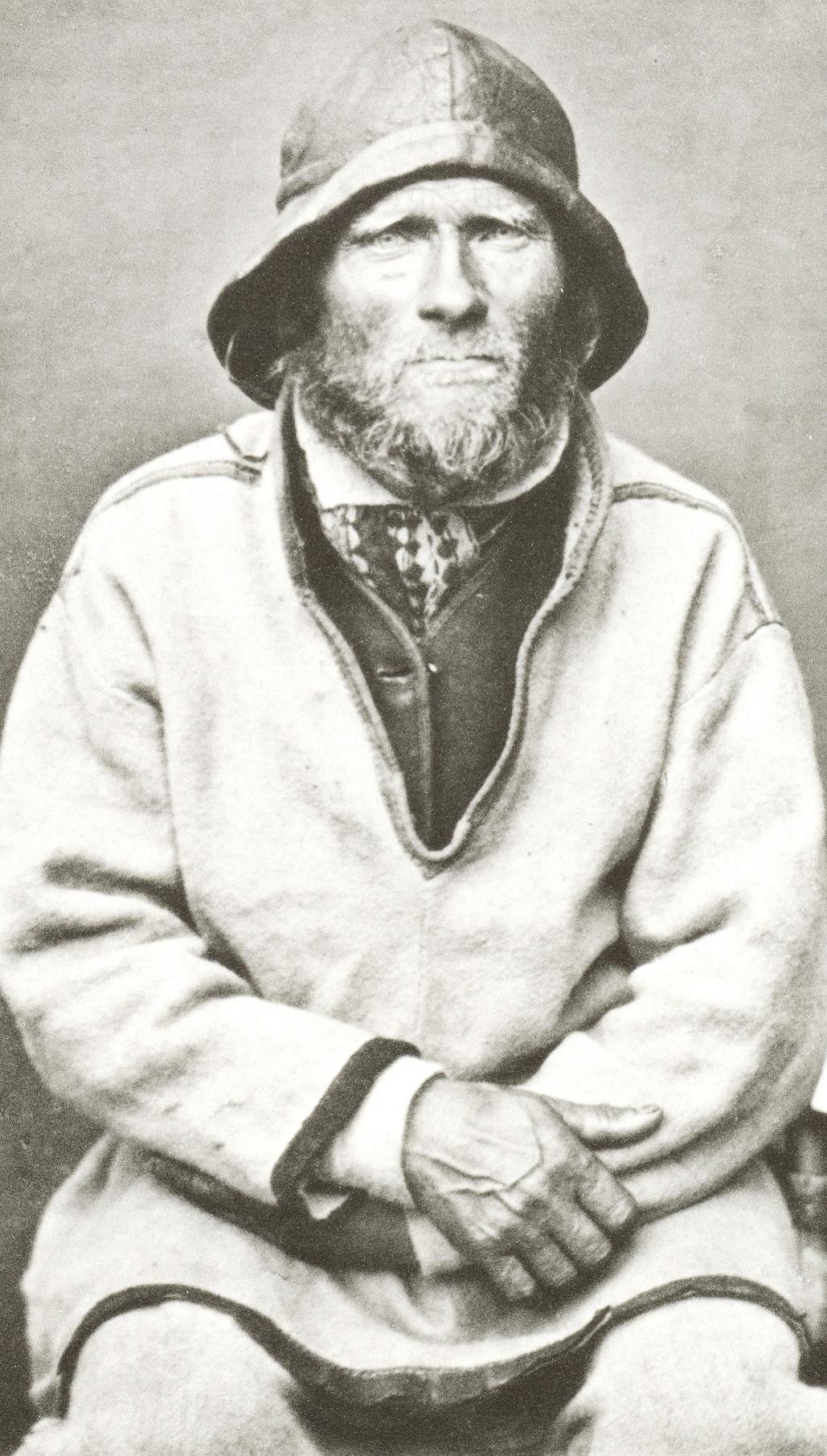
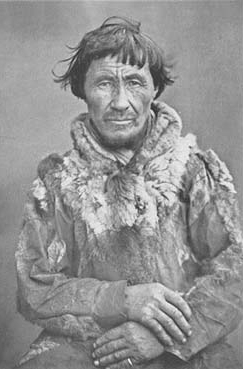
Sea Sámi men from Norway by Roland Bonaparte in 1884

Fishing has always been the main livelihood for the many Sámi living permanently in coastal areas. Archaeological research shows that the Sámi have lived along the coast and once lived much farther south in the past, and they were also involved in work other than reindeer herding (e.g., fishing, agriculture, iron work). The fishing along the north Norwegian coast, especially in the Lofoten and Vesterålen islands, is quite productive, with a variety of fish; during medieval times, it was a major source of income for both the fishermen and the Norwegian monarchy. With such massive population drops caused by the Black Death, the tax revenues from this industry greatly diminished. Because of the huge profits that could be had from these fisheries, the local authorities offered incentives to the Sámi—faced with their own population pressures—to settle on the newly vacant farms. This started the economic division between the Sea Sámi (sjøsamene), who fished extensively off the coast, and the Mountain Sámi (fjellsamene, innlandssamene), who continued to hunt reindeer and small-game animals. They later herded reindeer.

Even as late as the early 18th century, there were many Sámi who were still settling on these farms left abandoned from the 1350s. After many years of continuous migration, these Sea Sámi became far more numerous than the reindeer-herding mountain Sámi, who only make up 10% of all Sámi. There have been consultations between the Government of Norway and the Sámi Parliament regarding the right of the coastal Sámi to fish in the seas on the basis of historical use and international law. State regulation of sea fisheries underwent drastic change in the late 1980s. The regulation linked quotas to vessels and not to fishers. These newly calculated quotas were distributed free of charge to larger vessels on the basis of the amount of the catch in previous years, resulting in small vessels in Sámi districts falling outside the new quota system to a large degree.

==== Mountain Sámi ====
As the Sea Sámi settled along Norway's fjords and inland waterways, pursuing a combination of farming, cattle raising, trapping and fishing, the minority Mountain Sámi continued to live a semi-nomadic lifestyle travelling seasonally with their reindeer. Around 1500, they began to exhibit practices similar to what is commonly considered a 'traditional' Sámi lifestyle. The Mountain Sámi potentially had to pay up to three states, Norway, Sweden, and Russia, as they crossed each border while following the annual reindeer migrations; this caused much resentment over the years. Between 1635 and 1659, the Swedish crown forced Swedish conscripts and Sámi cart drivers to work in the Nasa silver mine, causing many Sámis to emigrate from the area to avoid forced labour. As a result, the population of Pite- and Lule-speaking Sámi decreased greatly.

=== Post-1800s ===
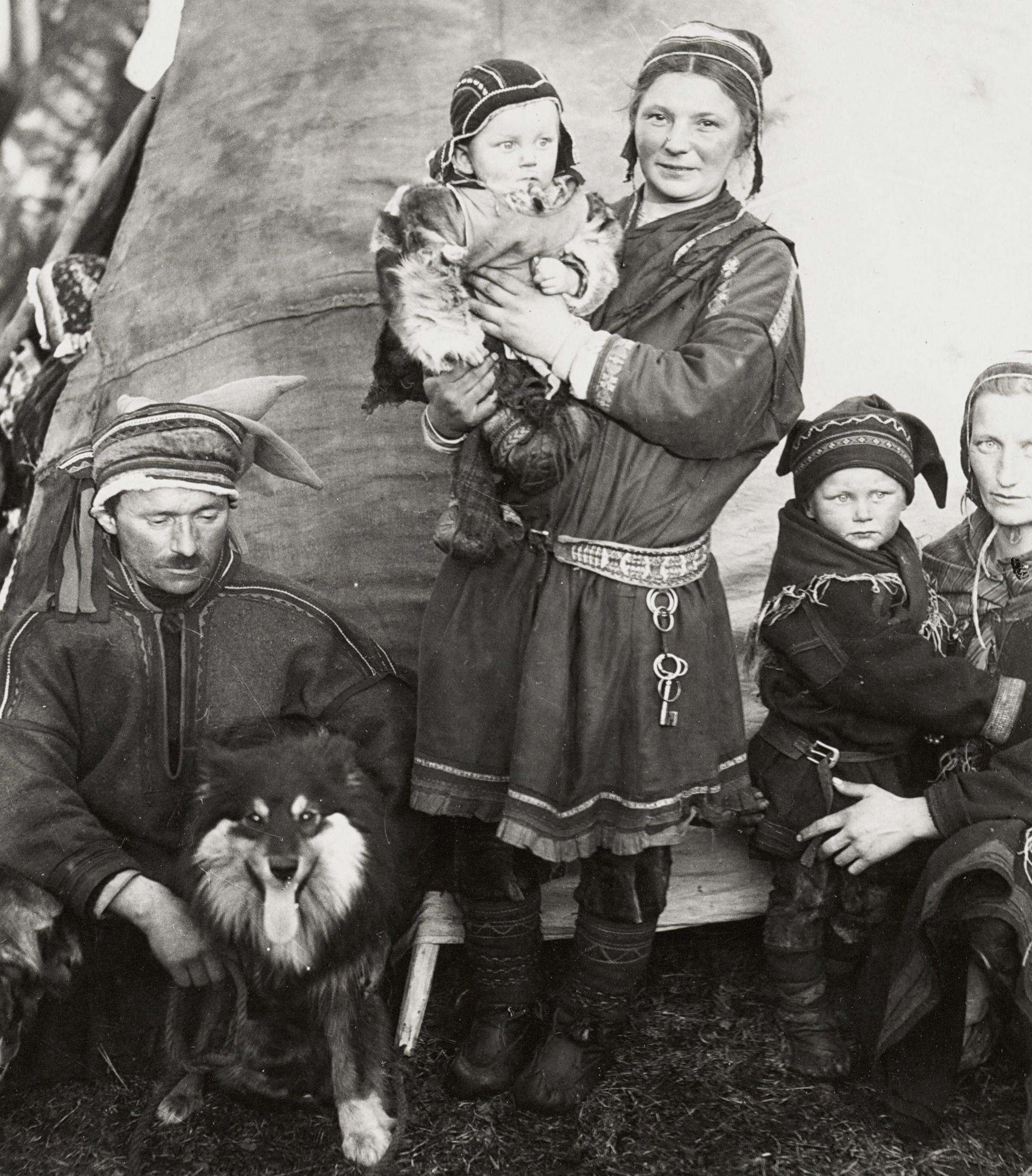
Sámi family from Finland in 1936

For long periods of time, the Sámi lifestyle thrived because of its adaptation to the Arctic environment. Indeed, throughout the 18th century, as Norwegians of Northern Norway suffered from low fish prices and consequent depopulation, the Sámi cultural element was strengthened, since the Sámi were mostly independent of supplies from Southern Norway.

During the 19th century, the pressure of Christianization of the Sámi increased, with some Sámi adopting Laestadianism. With the introduction of seven compulsory years of school in 1889, the Sámi language and traditional way of life came increasingly under pressure from forced cultural normalization. Strong economic development of the north also ensued, giving Norwegian culture and language higher status.

On the Swedish and Finnish sides, the authorities were less militant, although the Sámi language was forbidden in schools and strong economic development in the north led to weakened cultural and economic status for the Sámi. From 1913 to 1920, the Swedish race-segregation political movement created a race-based biological institute that collected research material from living people and graves. Throughout history, Swedish settlers were encouraged to move to the northern regions through incentives such as land and water rights, tax allowances, and military exemptions.

The strongest pressure took place from around 1900 to 1940, when Norway invested considerable money and effort to assimilate Sámi culture. Anyone who wanted to buy or lease state lands for agriculture in Finnmark had to prove knowledge of the Norwegian language and had to register with a Norwegian name. This partly caused the dislocation of Sámi people in the 1920s. Another example of forced displacement occurred between 1919 and 1920 in Norway and Sweden. This has been the topic of a recent work of journalism by Sámi author Elin Anna Labba, translated into English in 2023 under the title The Rocks Will Echo Our Sorrow: The Forced Displacement of the Northern Sámi.

Another factor was the scorched earth policy conducted by the German army, resulting in heavy war destruction in northern Finland and northern Norway in 1944–1945, destroying all existing houses, or kota, and visible traces of Sámi culture. After World War II, the pressure was relaxed, though the legacy was evident into recent times, such as the 1970s law limiting the size of any house Sámi people were allowed to build.

The controversy over the construction of the hydro-electric power station in Alta Municipality in 1979 brought Sámi rights onto the political agenda. In August 1986, the national anthem ("Sámi soga lávlla") and flag (Sámi flag) of the Sámi people were created. In 1989, the first Sámi parliament in Norway was elected. In 2005, the Finnmark Act was passed in the Norwegian parliament giving the Sámi parliament and the Finnmark Provincial council a joint responsibility of administering the land areas previously considered state property. These areas (96% of the provincial area), which have always been used primarily by the Sámi, now belong officially to the people of the province, whether Sámi or Norwegian, and not to the Norwegian state.

=== Contemporary issues ===
The Indigenous Sámi population is a mostly urbanised demographic, but a substantial number live in villages in the high Arctic. The Sámi are still coping with the cultural consequences of language and culture loss caused by generations of Sámi children being taken to missionary or state-run boarding schools and the legacy of laws that were created to deny the Sámi rights (e.g., to their beliefs, language, land and to the practice of traditional livelihoods). The Sámi are experiencing cultural and environmental threats, including: oil exploration, mining, dam building, logging, climate change, military bombing ranges, tourism and commercial development.

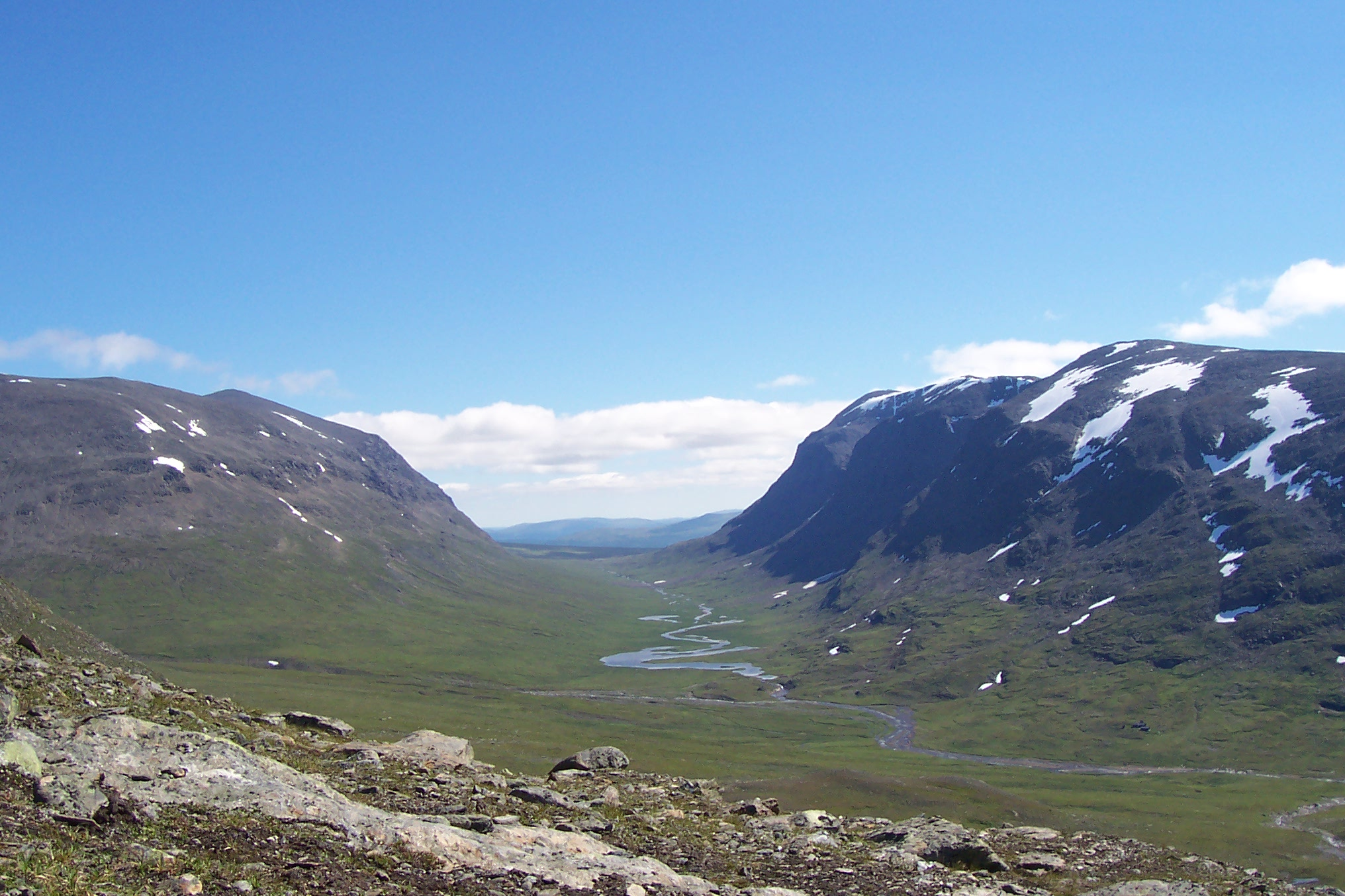
Vindelfjällen

==== Natural resource extraction ====
Sápmi is rich in precious metals, oil, and natural gas. Mining activities and prospecting to extract these resources from the region often interfere with reindeer grazing and calving areas and other aspects of traditional Sámi life. Some active mining locations include ancient Sámi spaces that are designated as ecologically protected areas, such as the Vindelfjällen Nature Reserve. The Sámi Parliament has opposed and rejected mining projects in the Finnmark area, and demanded that resources and mineral exploration benefit local Sámi communities and populations, as the proposed mines are in Sámi lands and will affect their ability to maintain their traditional livelihood. In Kallak (Sámi: Gállok) a group of Indigenous and non-Indigenous activists protested against the UK-based mining company Beowulf which operated a drilling program in lands used for grazing reindeer during the winter. There is often local opposition to new mining projects where environmental impacts are perceived to be very large, as very few plans for mine reclamation have been made. In Sweden, taxes on minerals are intentionally low in an effort to increase mineral exploration for economic benefit, though this policy is at the expense of Sámi populations. ILO Convention No. 169 would grant rights to the Sámi people to their land and give them power in matters that affect their future.

In Russia's Kola Peninsula, vast areas have already been destroyed by mining and smelting activities, and further development is imminent. This includes oil and natural gas exploration in the Barents Sea. Oil spills affect fishing and the construction of roads. There is a gas pipeline that stretches across the Kola Peninsula, and power lines cut off access to reindeer calving grounds and sacred sites.

In northern Finland, there has been a longstanding dispute over the destruction of forests, which prevents reindeer from migrating between seasonal feeding grounds and destroys supplies of lichen that grow on the upper branches of older trees. This lichen is the reindeer's only source of sustenance during the winter months, when snow is deep. The logging has been under the control of the state-run forest system. Greenpeace, reindeer herders, and Sámi organisations carried out a historic joint campaign, and in 2010, Sámi reindeer herders won some time as a result of these court cases. Industrial logging has now been pushed back from the most important forest areas either permanently or for the next 20 years, though there are still threats, such as mining and construction plans of holiday resorts on the protected shorelines of Lake Inari.

==== Land rights ====
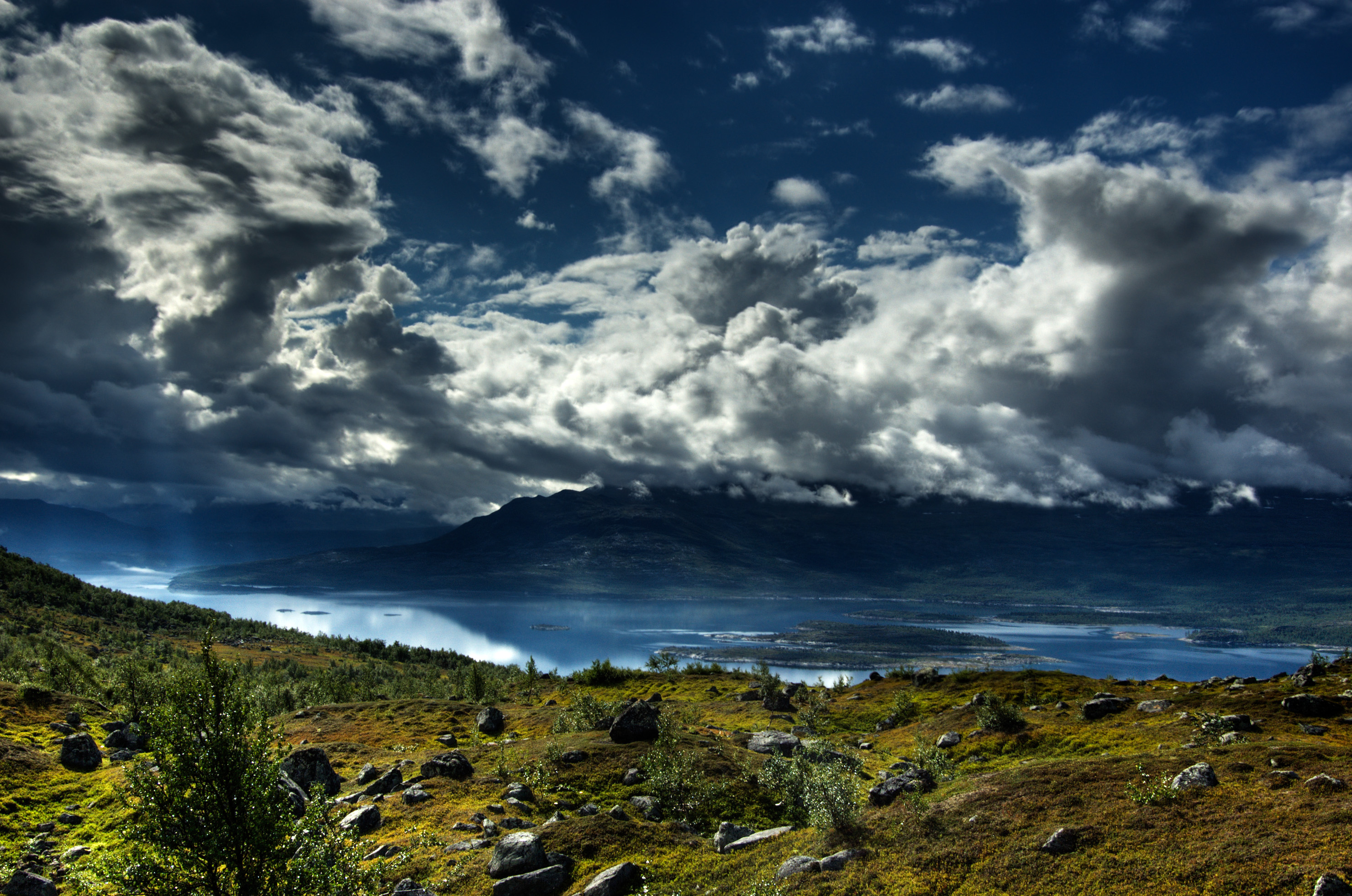
Suorvajaure near Piteå

The Swedish government has allowed the world's largest onshore wind farm to be built in Piteå, in the Arctic region where the Eastern Kikkejaure village has its winter reindeer pastures. The wind farm will consist of more than 1,000 wind turbines and an extensive road infrastructure, which means that the feasibility of using the area for winter grazing in practice is impossible. Sweden has received strong international criticism, including by the UN Racial Discrimination Committee and the Human Rights Committee, that Sweden violates Sámi landrättigheter (land rights), including by not regulating industry. In Norway some Sámi politicians (for example—Aili Keskitalo) suggest giving the Sámi Parliament a special veto right on planned mining projects.

Government authorities and NATO have built bombing-practice ranges in Sámi areas in northern Norway and Sweden. These regions have served as reindeer calving and summer grounds for thousands of years, and contain many ancient Sámi sacred sites.

In October 2024, the United Nations Committee on Economic, Social and Cultural Rights ruled Finland had violated Sámi Indigenous people's rights to their land and culture. The decision responded to a petition filed by 17 members of the Sámi community regarding encroachment on their traditional territories for prospective mining activities. The UNCESCR relied on the International Covenant on Economic, Social and Cultural Rights in recognizing "Indigenous Peoples' right to land as an indispensable part of their right to take part in cultural life." The committee concluded Finland failed to properly consult the Sámi community, and directed the country to provide complainants with reparations as well as modify legislation regarding environmental, social, and cultural impact assessments. The decision was significant, as it marked the first time European Indigenous peoples were able to defend their land rights without relying on conventional property definitions, instead using concepts like cultural rights and living standards.

==== Water rights ====
State regulation of sea fisheries underwent drastic change in the late 1980s. The regulation linked quotas to vessels and not to fishers. These newly calculated quotas were distributed free of cost to larger vessels on the basis of the amount of the catch in previous years, resulting in small vessels in Sámi districts falling outside the new quota system to a large degree.

The Sámi recently stopped a water-prospecting venture that threatened to turn an ancient sacred site and natural spring called Suttesaja into a large-scale water-bottling plant for the world market—without notification or consultation with the local Sámi people, who make up 70 percent of the population. The Finnish National Board of Antiquities has registered the area as a heritage site of cultural and historical significance, and the stream itself is part of the Deatnu/Tana watershed, which is home to Europe's largest salmon river, an important source of Sámi livelihood.

In Norway, government plans for the construction of a hydroelectric power plant in the Alta river in Finnmark in northern Norway led to a political controversy and the rallying of the Sámi popular movement in the late 1970s and early 1980s. As a result, the opposition in the Alta controversy brought attention to not only environmental issues but also the issue of Sámi rights.

==== Climate change and the environment ====
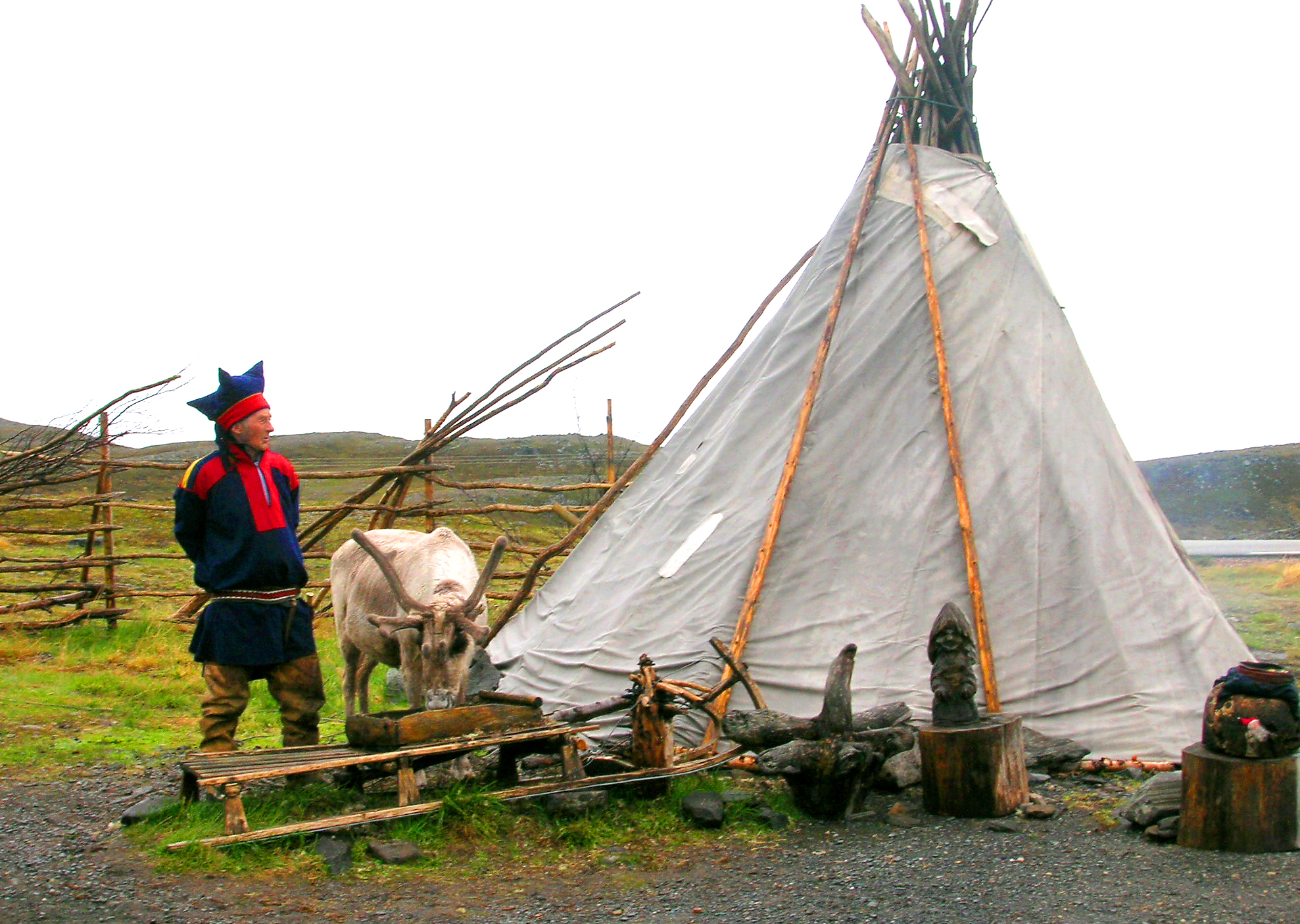
Sámi man from Norway

Reindeer have major cultural and economic significance for Indigenous peoples of the North. The human-ecological systems in the North, like reindeer pastoralism, are sensitive to change, perhaps more than in virtually any other region of the globe, due in part to the variability of the Arctic climate and ecosystem and the characteristic ways of life of Indigenous Arctic peoples.

The 1986 Chernobyl nuclear disaster caused nuclear fallout in the sensitive Arctic ecosystems and poisoned fish, meat and berries. Lichens and mosses are two of the main forms of vegetation in the Arctic and are highly susceptible to airborne pollutants and heavy metals. Since many do not have roots, they absorb nutrients, and toxic compounds, through their leaves. The lichens accumulated airborne radiation, and 73,000 reindeer had to be killed as "unfit" for human consumption in Sweden alone. The government promised Sámi indemnification but has not followed through on this promise.

Radioactive wastes and spent nuclear fuel have been stored in the waters off the Kola Peninsula, including locations that are only two kilometers from places where Sámi live. There are a minimum of five "dumps" where spent nuclear fuel and other radioactive waste are being deposited in the Kola Peninsula, often with little concern for the surrounding environment or population.

==== Tourism ====
The tourism industry in Finland has been criticized for turning Sámi culture into a marketing tool by promoting opportunities to experience "authentic" Sámi ceremonies and lifestyle. At many tourist locales, non-Sámi dress in inaccurate replicas of Sámi traditional clothing, and gift shops sell crude reproductions of Sámi handicraft. One popular "ceremony", crossing the Arctic Circle, actually has no significance in Sámi spirituality. To some Sámi, this is an insulting display of cultural exploitation.

==== Repatriation of objects and human remains to Lapland ====
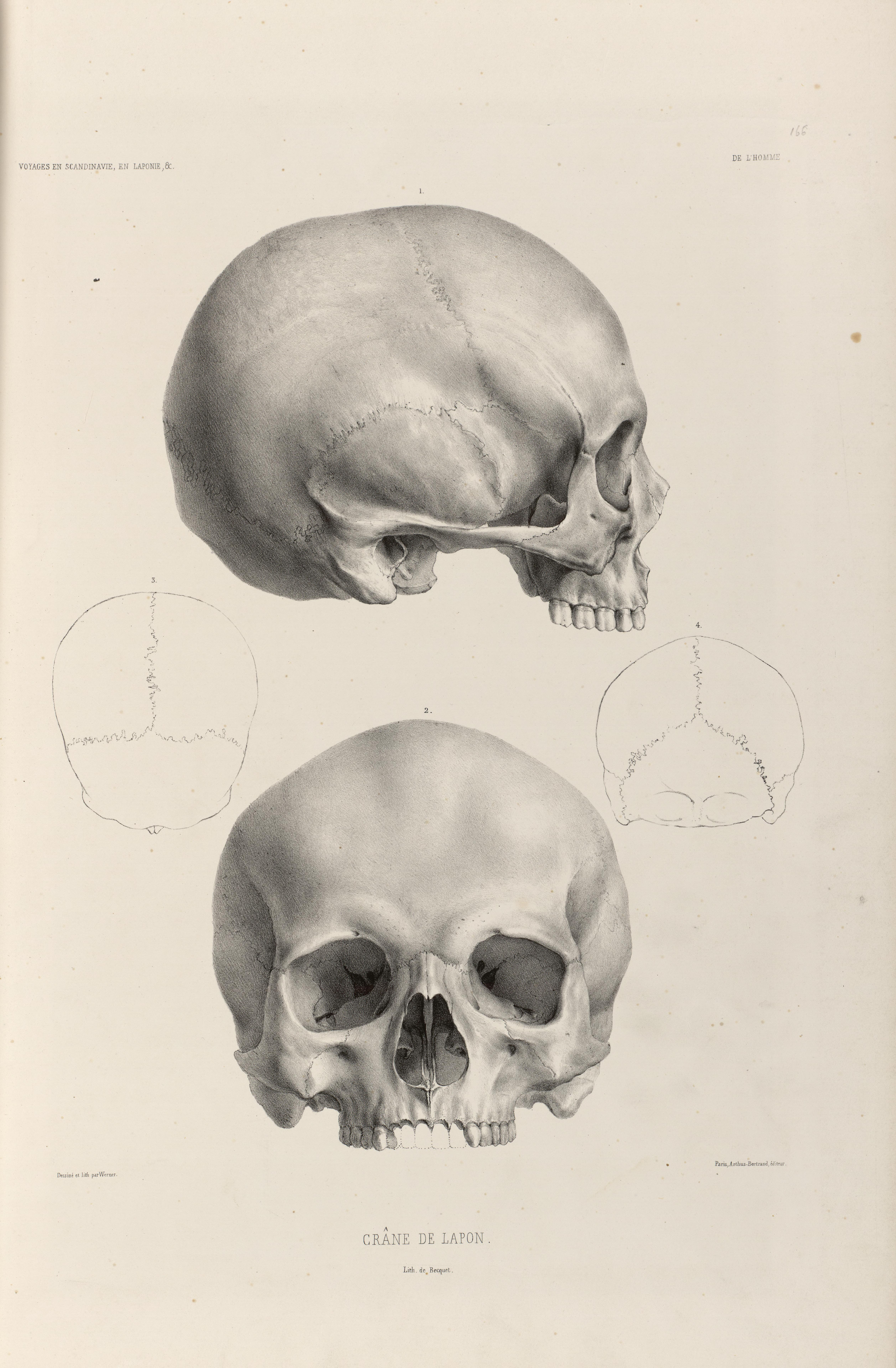
Crâne de Lapon (Lapp skull): illustration from the book Travels of the Scientific Commission of the North, in Scandinavia, Lapland, Spitsbergen and the Faroe Islands, 1852

Since the late 1990s, the Sámi have occasionally obtained the repatriation of ceremonial or handicraft objects. These had been collected in the 19th century by the Swedes for "scientific" reasons and preserved in museums. Similarly, considered valuable for research in racial biology, many Sámi human remains had been unearthed at the request of universities. At the time, Sámi were considered inferior to "the Nordic race."

In 1997, after several refusals, the skulls of the two decapitated leaders of a Sámi uprising in 1852 were officially reburied. Other small-scale repatriations – two or three skulls at a time – followed. In 2019, on the occasion of the International Day of the World's Indigenous Peoples, 25 skulls were reburied in the Swedish municipality of Lycksele.

In May 2025, two new skulls were repatriated to the Gammelstad cemetery in Swedish Lapland.

== Discrimination against the Sámi ==
For centuries, the Sámi have been the subject of discrimination and abuse by the dominant cultures in the nations they have historically inhabited. They have never been a single community in a single region of Sápmi, which until recently was considered only a cultural region.

Norway has been criticized internationally for the politics of Norwegianization of and discrimination against the Sámi. On 8 April 2011, recommendations from the UN Racial Discrimination Committee were delivered to Norway, addressing many issues related to the legacy of Norwegianization policies, including the need for more Sámi language education, interpreters, and cultural support. One committee recommendation was that discrimination against someone based upon their language be added to Article 1 of the Norwegian Discrimination and Accessibility Act. A new present status report was to have been ready by the end of 2012. In 2018, the Storting commissioned the Truth and Reconciliation Commission to lay the foundation for recognition of the experiences of the Sámi subject to Norwegianization and the subsequent consequences.

Sweden has faced similar criticism for its Swedification policies, which began in the 1800s and lasted until the 1970s. In 1919, The Swedish government effectively began a policy of displacing the Sami people with the passing of the Reindeer Grazing Convention.In 2020, Sweden funded the establishment of an independent truth commission to examine and document past abuse of Sámi by the Swedish state. In 2021, the Church of Sweden made a formal apology to Sweden's Sámi population for its role in forced conversions and Swedification efforts, outlining a multiyear reconciliation plan.

In Finland, where Sámi children, like all Finnish children, are entitled to daycare and language instruction in their own language, the Finnish government has denied funding for these rights in most of the country, including in Rovaniemi, the largest municipality in Finnish Lapland. Sámi activists have pushed for nationwide application of these basic rights. The city of Rovaniemi offers daycare and preschool education in the Sámi language, and then as basic education first as supplementary native language education starting from the first grade and as a voluntary subject on its own starting from the fourth grade.

As in the other countries claiming sovereignty over Sámi lands, Sámi activists' efforts in Finland in the 20th century achieved limited government recognition of the Sámis' rights as a recognized minority, but the Finnish government has maintained its legally enforced premise that the Sámi must prove their land ownership, an idea incompatible with and antithetical to the traditional reindeer-herding Sámi way of life. This has effectively allowed the Finnish government to take without compensation, motivated by economic gain, land occupied by the Sámi for centuries. Non-Sámi Finns began to move to Lapland in the 1550s.

== Government ==
=== Official Sámi policies ===
==== Norway ====
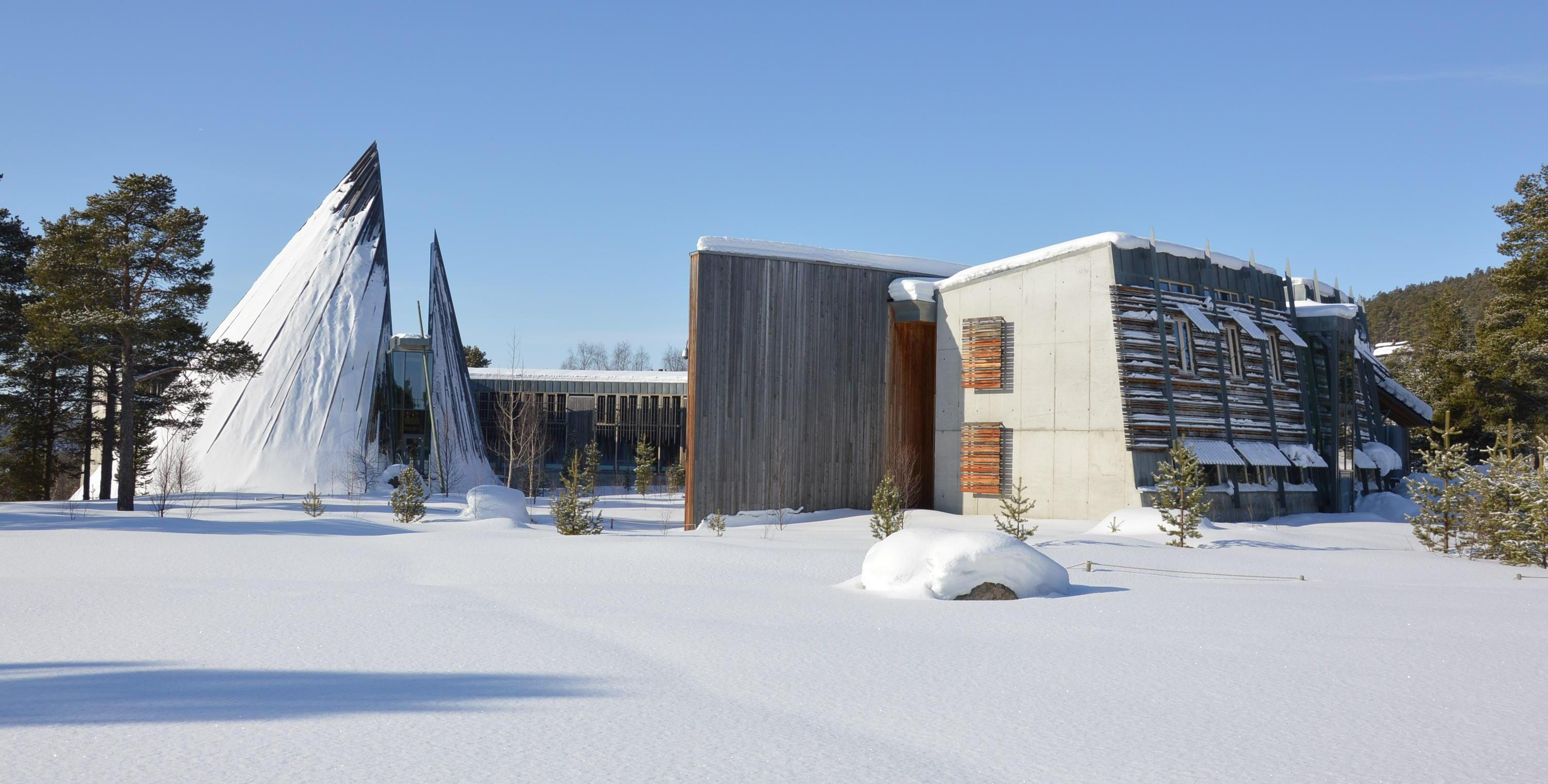
Sámi Parliament of Norway

The Sámi have been recognized as an Indigenous people in Norway (1990 according to ILO convention 169 as described below), and therefore, according to international law, the Sámi people in Norway are entitled special protection and rights. The legal foundation of the Sámi policy is:

- Article 108 of the Norwegian Constitution.
- The Sámi Act (12 June 1987, No. 56).

The constitutional amendment states: "It is the responsibility of the authorities of the State to create conditions enabling the Sámi people to preserve and develop its language, culture and way of life." This provides a legal and political protection of the Sámi language, culture and society. In addition the "amendment implies a legal, political and moral obligation for Norwegian authorities to create an environment conducive to the Sámis themselves influencing on the development of the Sámi community".

The Sámi Act provides special rights for the Sámi people:

- "the Sámis shall have their own national Sámi Parliament elected by and amongst the Sámis" (Chapter 1–2)
- The Sámi and Norwegian languages have equal standing in Norway (section 15; Chapter 3 contains details with regards to the use of the Sámi language).

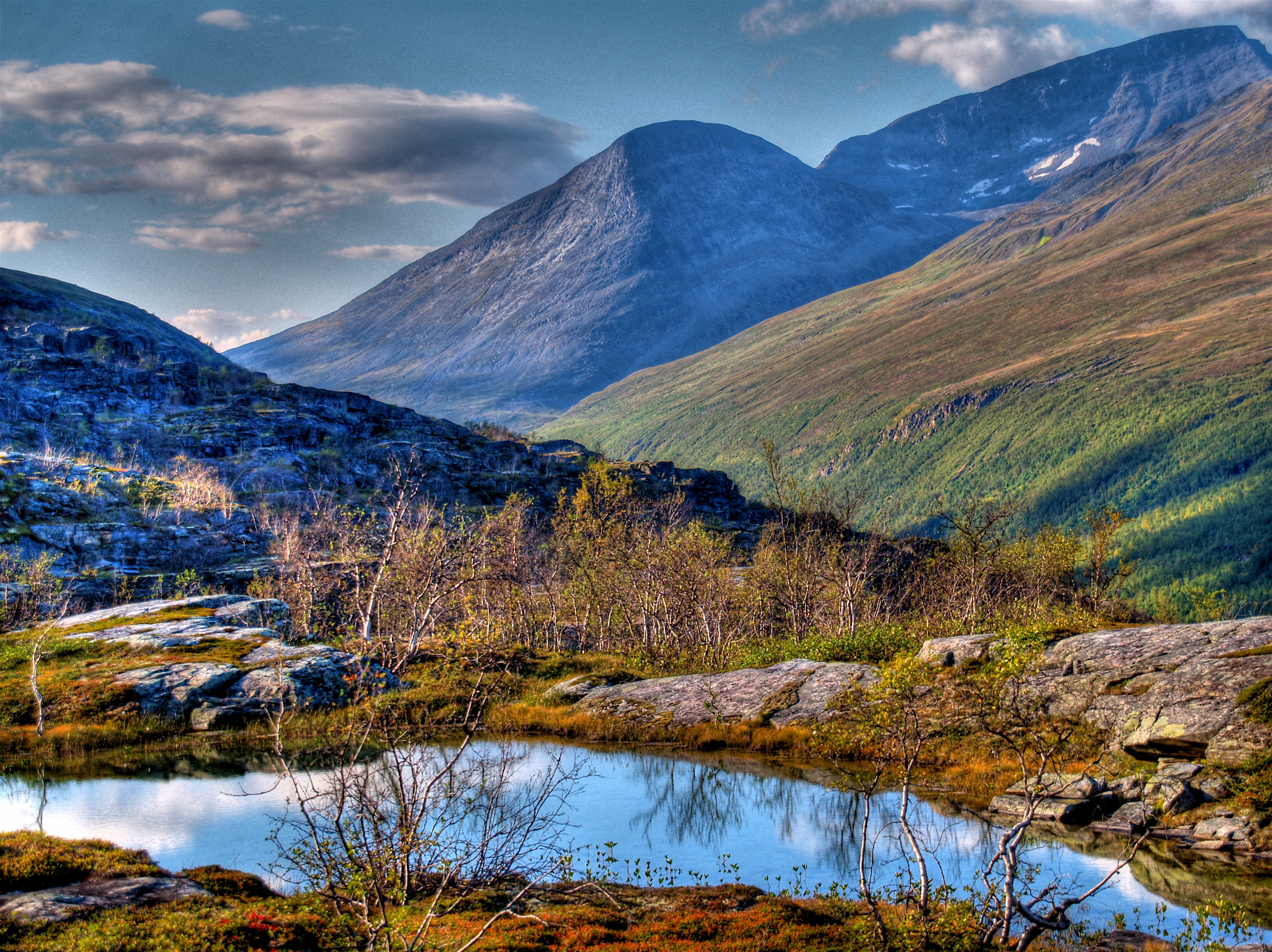
Mountain landscape near Kvalsund in Hammerfest Municipality

The Norwegian Sámi Parliament also elects 50% of the members to the board of the Finnmark Estate, which controls 95% of the land in the county of Finnmark.

In addition, the Sámi have special rights to reindeer husbandry. In 2007, the Norwegian Parliament passed the new Reindeer Herding Act acknowledging the siida (Sámi corporation) as the basic institution regarding land rights, organization, and daily herding management.

Norway has also accepted international conventions, declarations and agreements applicable to the Sámi as a minority and Indigenous people including:

- The International Covenant on Civil and Political Rights (1966). Article 27 protects minorities, and Indigenous peoples, against discrimination: "In those states in which ethnic, religious or linguistic minorities exist, persons belonging to such minorities, shall not be denied the right, in community with the other members of their group, to enjoy their own culture, to profess and practice their own religion, or use their own language."
- ILO Convention No. 169 concerning Indigenous and Tribal Peoples in Independent Countries (1989). The convention states that rights for the Indigenous peoples to land and natural resources are recognized as central for their material and cultural survival. In addition, Indigenous peoples should be entitled to exercise control over, and manage, their own institutions, ways of life and economic development in order to maintain and develop their identities, languages and religions, within the framework of the states in which they live.
- The International Convention on the Elimination of All Forms of Racial Discrimination (1965).
- The UN Convention on the Rights of the Child (1989).
- The UN Convention on the Elimination of All Forms of Discrimination against Women (1979).
- The Council of Europe's Framework Convention for the Protection of National Minorities (1995).
- The Council of Europe's Charter for Regional and Minority Languages (1992).
- The UN Declaration on the Rights of Indigenous Peoples (2007).

==== Sweden ====
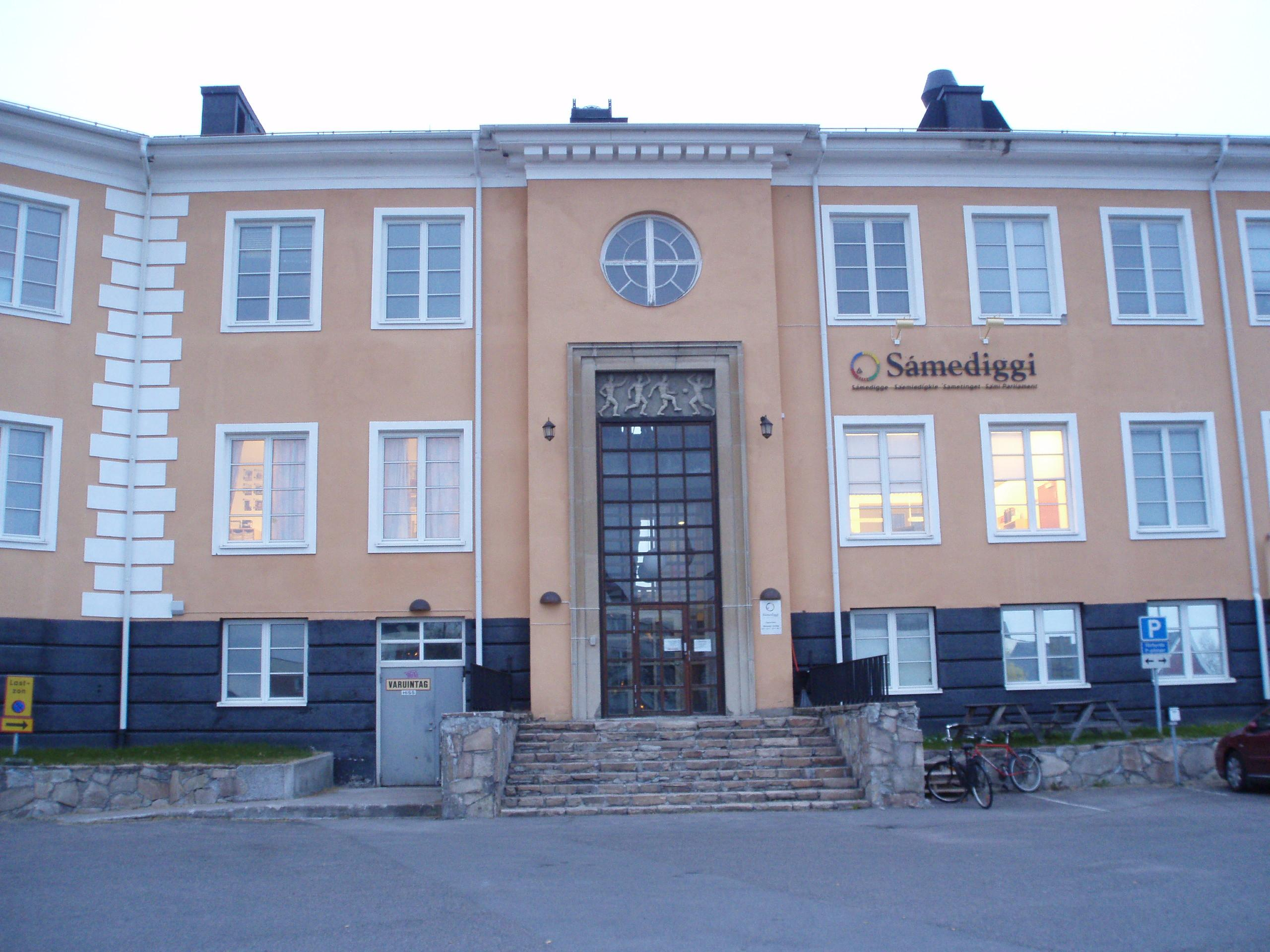
Sámi Parliament in Sweden

Sweden recognised the existence of the "Sámi nation" in 1989, but the ILO Indigenous and Tribal Peoples Convention, C169 has not been adopted. The Sametingslag was established as the Swedish Sámi Parliament on 1 January 1993. In 1998, Sweden formally apologized for wrongs it had committed against the Sámi.

Sámi is one of five national minority languages recognized by Swedish law. The Compulsory School Ordinance states that Sámi pupils are entitled to be taught in their native language; however, a municipality is only obliged to arrange mother-tongue teaching in Sámi if a suitable teacher is available and the pupil has a basic knowledge of Sámi.

In 2010, after 15 years of negotiation, Laponiatjuottjudus, an association with Sámi majority control, were handed control over the UNESCO World Heritage Site Laponia. The reindeer-herding law has since applied in the area as well.

==== Finland ====
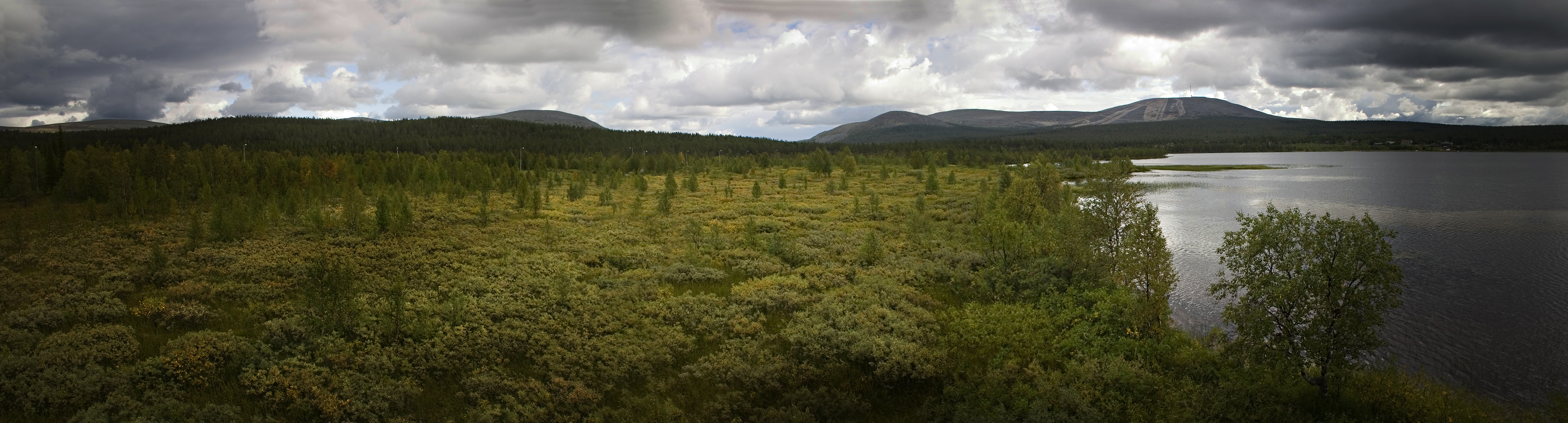
Land near Ylläs

Sámi people have had very little representation in Finnish national politics. In fact, in 2007, Janne Seurujärvi, a Finnish Centre Party representative, became the first Sámi ever to be elected to the Finnish Parliament.

Finnish Lapland. The three northernmost municipalities Utsjoki, Inari and Enontekiö and part of Sodankylä are officially considered the Sámi area.

Finland ratified the 1966 UN Covenant on Civil and Political Rights, although several cases have been brought before the UN Human Rights Committee. Of these, 36 cases involved determinations of the rights of individual Sámi in Finland and Sweden. The committee decisions clarify that Sámi are members of a minority within the meaning of Article 27 and that deprivation or erosion of their rights to practice traditional activities that are essential elements of their culture do come within the scope of Article 27. Finland recognized the Sámi as a "people" in 1995, but has yet to ratify ILO Convention 169 Concerning Indigenous and Tribal Peoples.

The act establishing the Finnish Sámi Parliament (Finnish: Saamelaiskäräjät) was passed on 9 November 1973.

Sámi in Finland have had access to Sámi language instruction in some schools since the 1970s, and language rights were established in 1992. Three Sámi languages are spoken in Finland: North Sámi, Skolt Sámi, and Inari Sámi. Of these, Inari Sámi, spoken by about 350 speakers, is the only one that is used entirely within the borders of Finland, mainly in the municipality of Inari.

The case of J. Lansman vs. Finland concerned a challenge by Sámi reindeer herders in northern Finland to the Finnish Central Forestry Board's plans to approve logging and road construction in an area used by the herdsmen as winter pasture and spring calving grounds. Finland has denied any aboriginal rights or land rights to the Sámi people; in Finland, non-Sámi can herd reindeer.

==== Russia ====
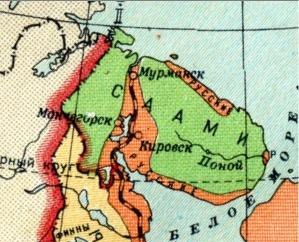
Kildin Sami Map (green). СААМИ is "Sámi" in Russian.

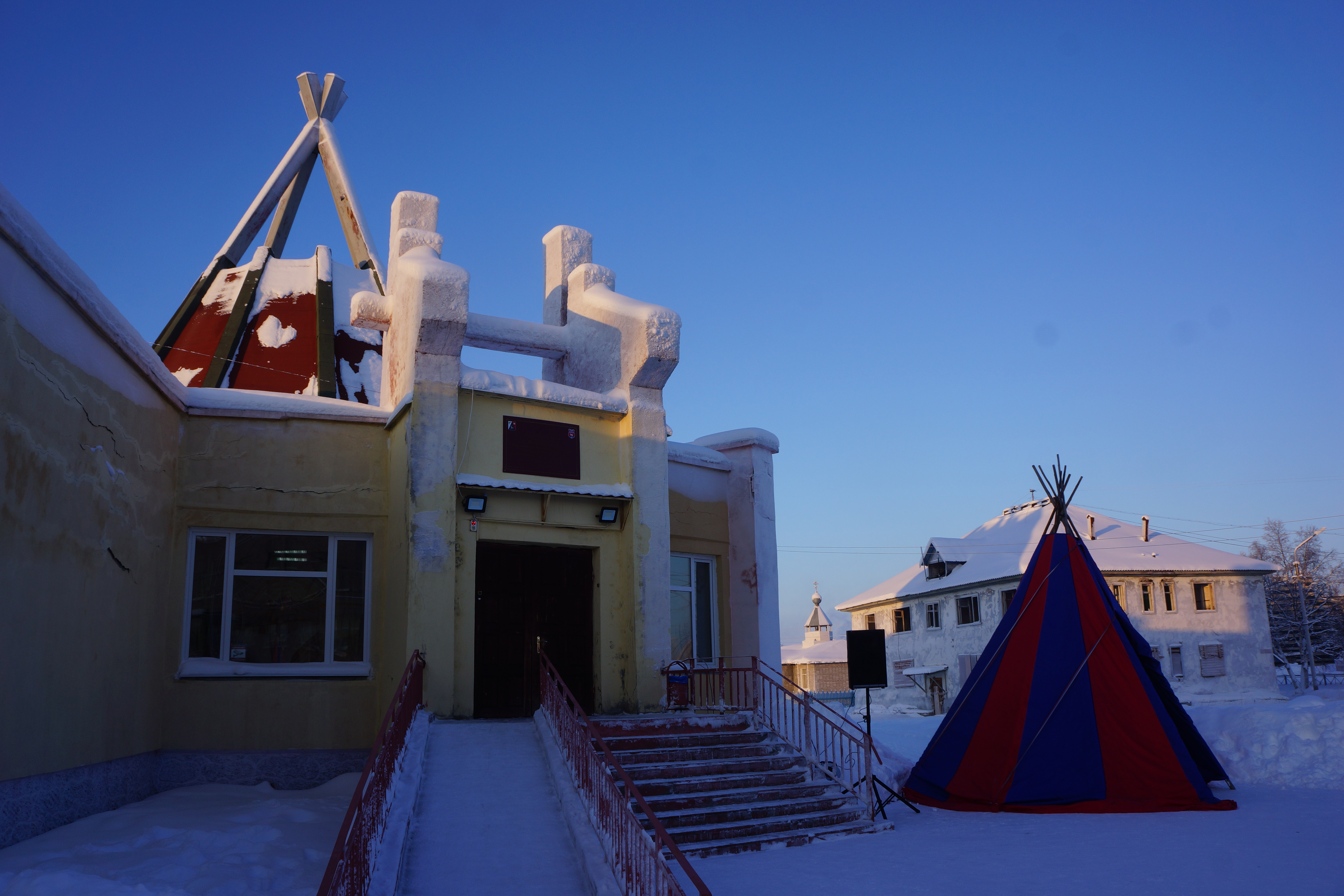
National Culture Centre in Lovozero

The 1822 Statute of Administration of Non-Russians in Siberia asserted state ownership over all land in Siberia and then "granted" possessory rights to the natives. Governance of Indigenous groups, and especially collection of taxes therefrom, necessitated protection of Indigenous peoples against exploitation by traders and settlers. During the Soviet era, the inhabitants of the Kola tundra were forcibly relocated to kolkhozes (collective communities) by the state; most Sámi were settled at Lujávri (Lovozero).

For the first time in Russia, the rights of Indigenous minorities were established in the 1993 Constitution. Article 69 of the Constitution states, "The Russian Federation guarantees the rights of small indigenous peoples in accordance with the generally accepted principles and standards of international law and international treaties of the Russian Federation."

The Russian Federation ratified the 1966 UN Covenant on Civil and Political Rights; Section 2 explicitly forbids depriving a people of "its own means of subsistence." The Russian Duma has adopted partial measures to implement it. The Russian Federation lists distinct Indigenous peoples as having special rights and protections under the Constitution and federal laws and decrees. These rights are linked to the category known since Soviet times as the malochislennye narody ("small-numbered peoples"), a term often translated as "Indigenous minorities," which include Arctic peoples such as the Sámi, Nenets, Evenki, and Chukchi.

In April 1999, the Duma passed a law guaranteeing socioeconomic and cultural development to all Indigenous minorities; protecting traditional living places; and acknowledging some form of limited ownership of territories that have traditionally been used for hunting, herding, fishing, and gathering. The law, however, does not anticipate the transfer of title in fee simple to Indigenous minorities. Nor does it recognize development rights, some proprietary rights including compensation for damage to the property, or limited exclusionary rights. It is not clear, however, whether protection of nature in traditional places of habitation implies a right to exclude conflicting uses that are destructive to nature, or whether the Sámi have the right to veto development.

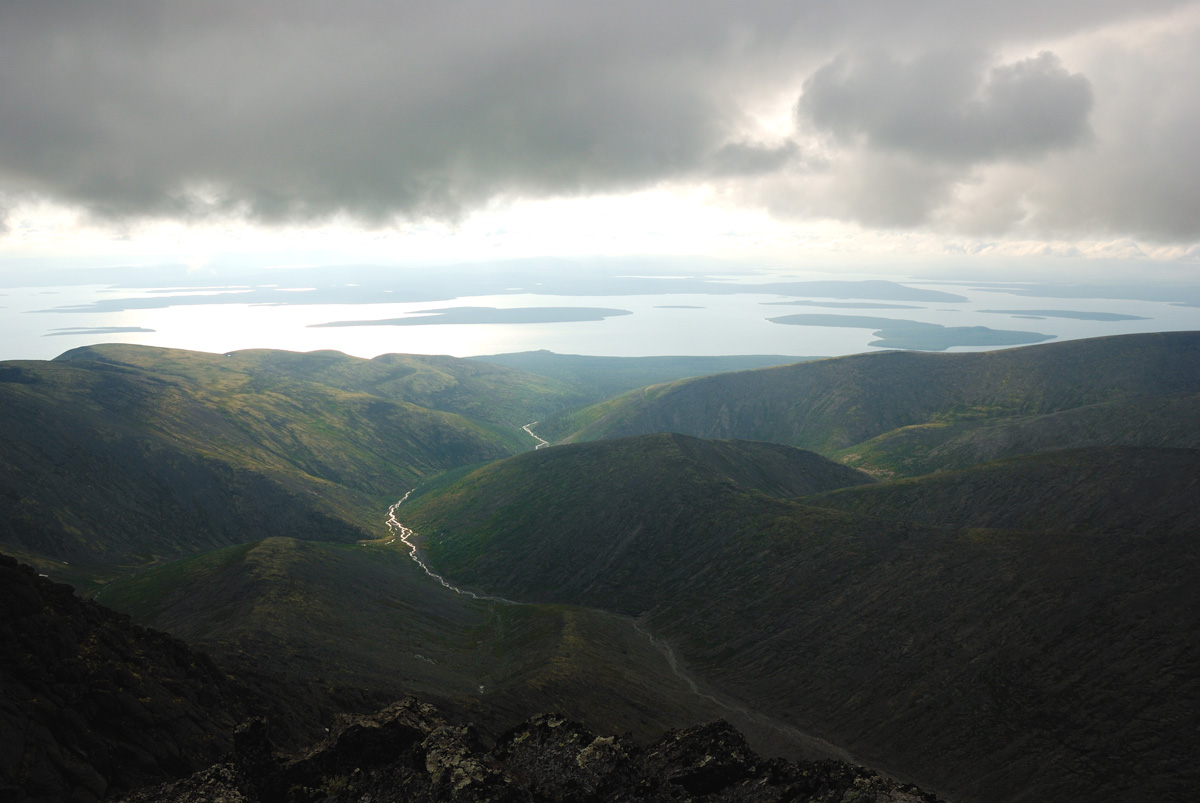
Khibiny massif, Kola Peninsula

The Russian Federation's Land Code reinforces the rights of numerically small peoples ("Indigenous minorities") to use places they inhabit and to continue traditional economic activities without being charged rent. Such lands cannot be allocated for unrelated activities (which might include oil, gas, and mineral development or tourism) without the consent of the Indigenous peoples. Furthermore, Indigenous minorities and ethnic groups are allowed to use environmentally protected lands and lands set aside as nature preserves to engage in their traditional modes of land use.

Regional law, the Code of the Murmansk Oblast, calls on the oblast's organs of state power to facilitate the native peoples of the Kola North, specifically naming the Sámi, "in realization of their rights for preservation and development of their native language, national culture, traditions and customs." The third section of Article 21 states, "In historically established areas of habitation, Sámi enjoy the rights for traditional use of nature and [traditional] activities."

Throughout the Russian North, Indigenous and local people have had difficulties exercising control over resources on which they and their ancestors have depended for centuries. The failure to protect Indigenous ways, however, stems not from inadequacy of the written law but rather from the failure to implement existing laws. Violations of Indigenous people's rights continue due to oil, gas, and mineral development and other activities (mining, timber cutting, commercial fishing, tourism) that bring foreign currency into the Russian economy. Many Indigenous groups in the Russian Arctic are semi-nomadic, moving seasonally to different hunting and fishing camps rather than exploiting any one location or commodity to exhaustion. Throughout northwestern Siberia, oil and gas development has disturbed pastureland and undermined the ability of Indigenous peoples to continue hunting, fishing, trapping, and herding. Roads constructed in connection with oil and gas exploration and development destroy and degrade pastureland, ancestral burial grounds, and sacred sites; and increase hunting by oil workers on the territory used by Indigenous peoples.

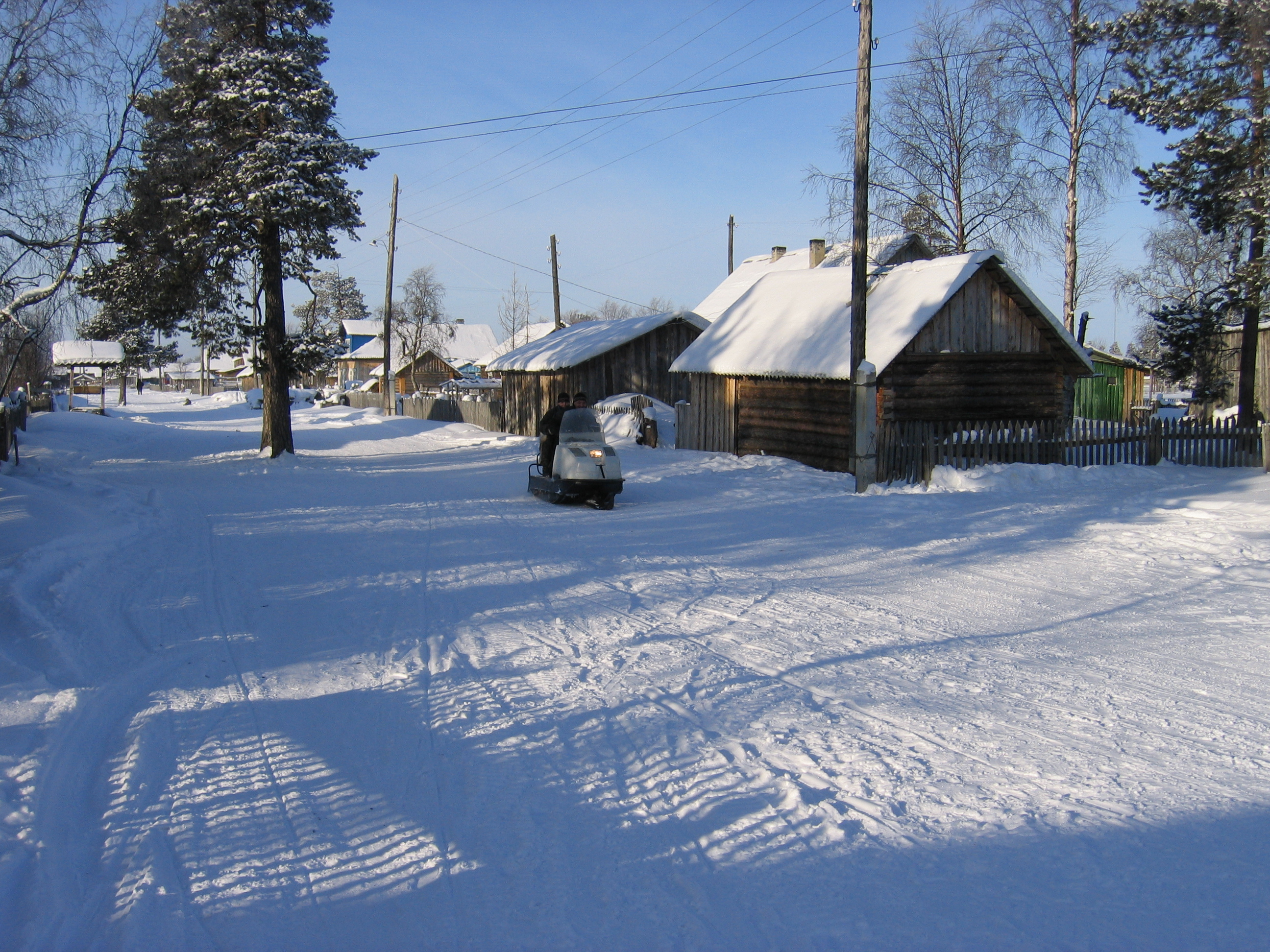
Krasnoshchelye village on the Ponoi River

In the Sámi homeland on the Kola Peninsula in northwestern Russia, regional authorities closed a 50-mi (80-km) stretch of the Ponoy River (and stretches of other rivers) to local fishing and granted exclusive fishing rights to the Ponoy River Company, a commercial company offering catch-and-release fishing to sport fishers largely from abroad. This deprived the local Sámi of food for their families and community and of their traditional economic livelihood, violating Article 21 of the Code of the Murmansk Oblast. Therefore, closing the rivers to locals may have violated the test articulated by the UN Human Rights Committee and disregarded the Land Code, other legislative acts, and the 1992 Presidential decree. Sámi are not only forbidden to fish in the 80-km stretch leased to the Ponoy River Company but are also required by regional laws to pay for licenses to catch a limited number of fish outside the lease area. Residents of remote communities have neither the power nor the resources to demand enforcement of their rights. Here and elsewhere in the circumpolar north, the failure to apply laws for the protection of Indigenous peoples leads to criminalization of local Indigenous populations who cannot survive without "poaching" resources that should be accessible to them legally.

Although Indigenous leaders in Russia have occasionally asserted Indigenous rights to land and resources, to date there has been no serious or sustained discussion of Indigenous group rights to ownership of land. Russia has not adopted the ILO Indigenous and Tribal Peoples Convention, C169.

==== Nordic Sámi Convention ====
On 16 November 2005 in Helsinki, a group of experts led by former Chief Justice of the Supreme Court of Norway Professor Carsten Smith submitted a proposal for a Nordic Sámi Convention to the annual joint meeting of the ministers responsible for Sámi affairs in Finland, Norway, and Sweden and the presidents of the three Sámi Parliaments from the respective countries. This convention recognizes the Sámi as one Indigenous people residing across national borders in all three countries. A set of minimum standards is proposed for the rights of developing the Sámi language and culture and rights to land and water, livelihoods and society. The convention has not yet been ratified in the Nordic countries.

=== Organization ===
Sápmi demonstrates a distinct semi-national identity that transcends the borders between Norway, Sweden, Finland, and Russia. There is no movement for a sovereign state, but they do seek greater autonomy in their respective nation states.

==== Sámi Parliaments ====
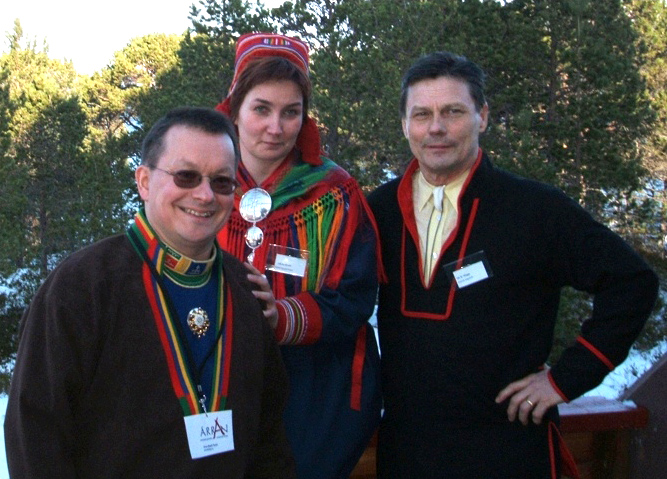
Sven-Roald Nystø, Aili Keskitalo, and Ole Henrik Magga, the three first presidents of the Sámi Parliament of Norway

The Sámi Parliaments (Sámediggi in Northern Sámi, Sämitigge in Inari Sámi, Sää'mte'ǧǧ in Skolt Sámi) founded in Finland (1973), Norway (1989), and Sweden (1993) are the representative bodies for peoples of Sámi heritage. Russia has not recognized the Sámi as a minority and therefore recognizes no Sámi parliament, although the Sámi there have formed an unrecognised Sámi Parliament of Russia. No single, unified Sámi parliament spans across the Nordic countries. Rather, each of Finland, Norway, and Sweden has set up its own separate legislatures for Sámi people. This said, these three Sámi Parliaments often work together on cross-border issues. In all three countries they act as an institution of cultural autonomy for the Indigenous Sámi people. The parliaments have very weak political influence, far from autonomy. They are formally public authorities ruled by the Scandinavian governments, but have democratically elected parliamentarians whose mission is to work for the Sámi people and culture. Candidates' election promises often conflict with the institutions' submission to their governments, but as authorities they do have some influence over the government.

==== Norwegian organizations ====
The main organisations for Sámi representation in Norway are the siidas. They cover northern and central Norway.

==== Swedish organizations ====
The main organisations for Sámi representation in Sweden are the siidas. They cover northern and central Sweden.

==== Finnish organizations ====
In contrast to Norway and Sweden, in Finland, a siida (paliskunta in Finnish) is a reindeer-herding corporation that is not restricted by ethnicity. There are indeed some ethnic Finns who practice reindeer herding, and in principle, all residents of the reindeer-herding area (most of Finnish Lapland and parts of Oulu province) who are citizens of EEA countries (i.e., the European Union and Norway, Iceland, and Liechtenstein) are allowed to join a paliskunta.

==== Russian organizations ====
In 2010, the Sámi Council supported the establishment of a cultural center in Russia for Arctic peoples. The Center for Northern Peoples aims to promote artistic and cultural cooperation between the Arctic peoples of Russia and the Nordic countries, with particular focus on Indigenous peoples and minorities.

==== Border conflicts ====
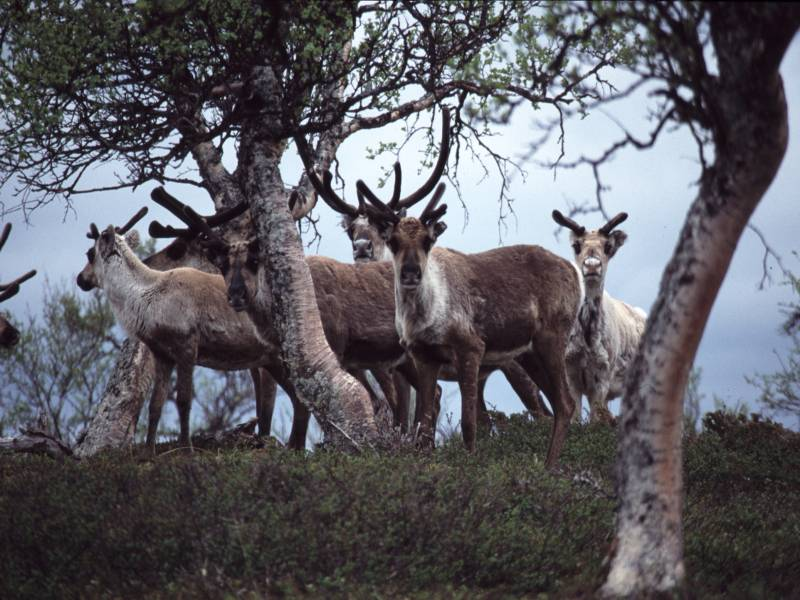
Land rights for grazing reindeer

Sápmi, the Sámi traditional lands, crosses the national borders of four nation-states. Traditional summer and winter pastures sometimes lie on different sides of these borders. In addition, there is a border drawn for modern-day Sápmi. Some state that the rights (for reindeer herding and, in some parts, even for fishing and hunting) include not only modern Sápmi but areas beyond it that reflect older territories. Sápmi's "borders" originate from the 14th–16th centuries, when land-owning conflicts occurred. The establishment of more-stable dwelling places and larger towns began in the 16th century for strategic-defence and economic reasons, both by peoples from Sámi groups themselves and by immigrants from further south.

Owning land within the borders or being a member of a siida bestows rights on an individual. A different law enacted in Sweden in the mid-1990s gave anyone the right to fish and hunt in the region, which was met with skepticism and anger among the siidas.

Court proceedings have been common throughout history. The aim from the Sámi viewpoint is to reclaim territories used earlier in history. Due to a major defeat in 1996, one siida has introduced a sponsorship "Reindeer Godfather" concept to raise funds for further battles in courts. These "internal conflicts" are usually conflicts between non-Sámi land owners and reindeer owners. Cases question the Sámi's ancient rights to reindeer pastures. In 2010, Sweden was criticized for its relations with the Sámi in the Universal Periodic Review conducted by the Working Group of the Human Rights Council.

The question of whether the territory of the fjeld is owned by the governments (crown land) or by the Sámi population has not yet been answered.

From an Indigenous perspective, the land does not belong to people; rather, people belong to the land. However, this does not mean that hunters, herders, and fishers do not know where the borders of their territories are located, as well as those of their neighbors.

== Culture ==
To make up for past suppression, the authorities of Norway, Sweden, and Finland now make efforts to build up Sámi cultural institutions and promote Sámi culture and language.

=== Sámi identity symbols ===
Although the Sámi have considered themselves to be one people throughout history, the idea of Sápmi, a Sámi nation, first gained acceptance among the Sámi in the 1970s and even later among the majority population. During the 1980s and 1990s, a Sámi flag was created, a Sámi anthem was written, and a date was established for a national day.

==== Sámi flag ====
Sámi flag

The Sámi flag was inaugurated during the Sámi Conference in Åre, Sweden, on 15 August 1986. It was the result of a competition for which many suggestions were entered. The winning design was submitted by the artist Astrid Båhl from Skibotn, Norway.

The motif (shown at right) was derived from the shaman's drum and the poem "Päiven Pārne'" ("Sons of the Sun") by the South Sámi Anders Fjellner, describing the Sámi as sons and daughters of the sun. The flag has the Sámi colours—red, green, yellow and blue—with a circle representing the sun (red) and the moon (blue).

==== Sámi National Day ====
Sámi National Day falls on 6 February, which was when the first Sámi congress was held in 1917 in Trondheim, Norway. This marked the first time that Norwegian and Swedish Sámi came together across their national borders to collaboratively find solutions for common problems. The resolution for celebrating on 6 February was passed in 1992 at the 15th Sámi congress in Helsinki. Since 1993, Norway, Sweden, and Finland have recognized 6 February as Sámi National Day.

==== "Song of the Sámi People" ====
"Sámi soga lávlla" ("Song of the Sámi People", lit. 'Song of the Sámi Family') was originally a poem written by Isak Saba that was first published in the newspaper Saǥai Muittalægje on 1 April 1906. In August 1986 it became the Sámi anthem. Arne Sørli set the poem to music, and the song was approved at the 15th Sámi Conference in Helsinki in 1992. "Sámi soga lávlla" has been translated into all of the Sámi languages.

=== Religion ===
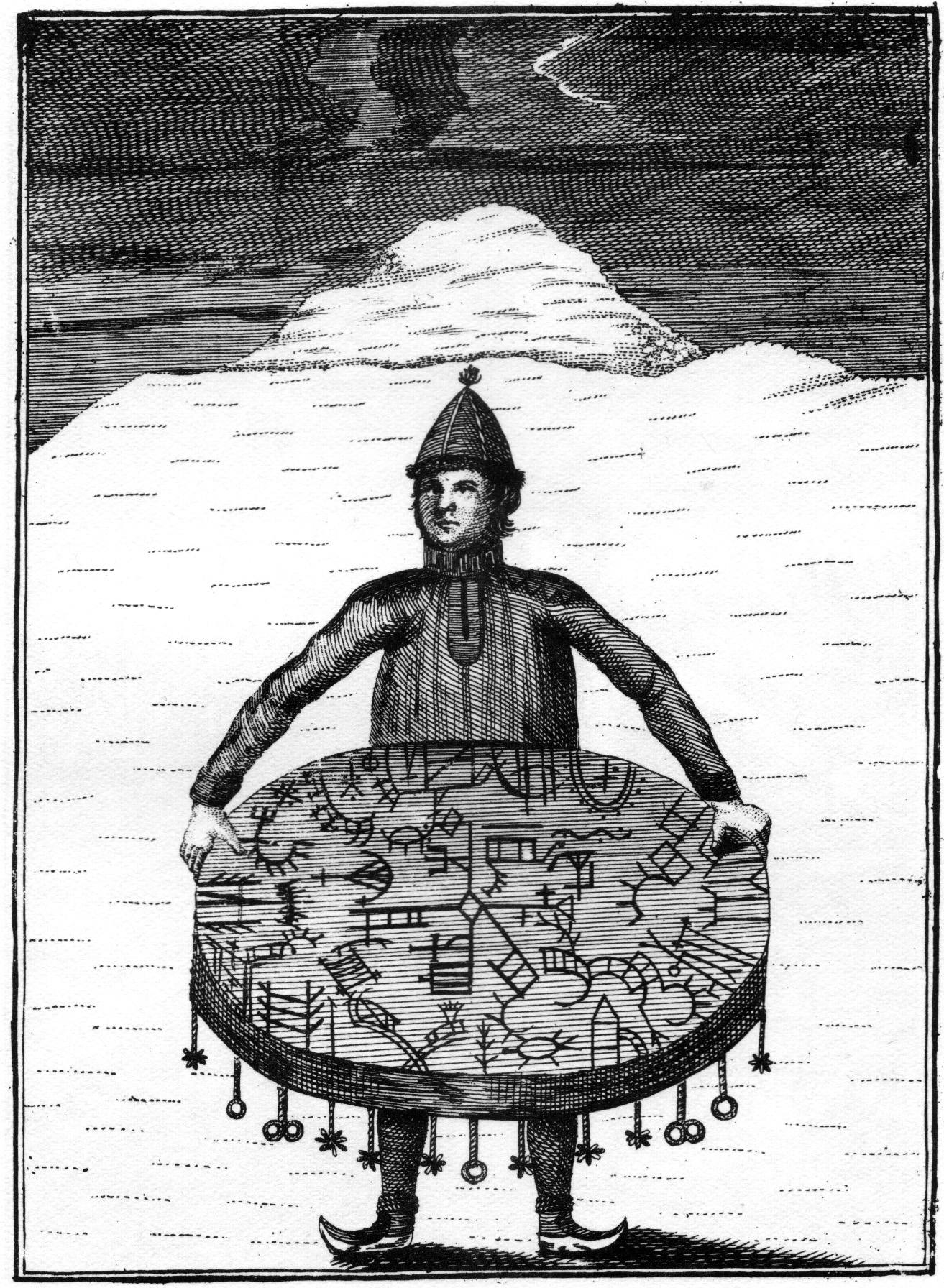
Copper etching (1767) by O. H. von Lode showing a noaidi with his meavrresgárri drum

Many Sámi people continued to practice their ancestral religion up until the 18th century. Today, most Sámi belong to the state-run Lutheran churches of Norway, Sweden and Finland. Some Sámi in Russia belong to the Russian Orthodox Church. Similarly, some Skolt Sámi whose ancestors resettled in Finland, as well as an additional small population in Norway., are part of Eastern Orthodox congregations.

==== Indigenous Sámi religion ====
Indigenous Sámi religion is a type of polytheism (see Sámi deities). There is some diversity due to the wide area that is Sápmi, allowing for the evolution of variations in beliefs and practices between tribes. The beliefs are closely connected to the land, animism, and the supernatural. Sámi spirituality is often characterized by pantheism, a strong emphasis on the importance of personal spirituality and its interconnectivity with one's own daily life, and a deep connection between the natural and spiritual "worlds." Among other roles, the Noaidi, or Sámi shaman, enables ritual communication with the supernatural through the use of tools such as drums, Joik, Fadno, chants, sacred objects, and fly agaric. Some practices within the Sámi religion involve natural sacred sites such as mountains, springs, álda and sáivu (sacred hills), sieidi (stones in natural or human-built formations), and other land formations, as well as human-made ones such as petroglyphs and labyrinths.

Sámi cosmology divides the universe into three worlds. The upper world is related to the South, warmth, life, and the color white; it is also the dwelling of the gods. The middle world, like the Norse Midgard, is the dwelling of humans; it is associated with the color red. The third world is the underworld. It is associated with the color black; it represents the north and the cold; and it is inhabited by otters, loons, seals, and mythical animals.

Sámi religion shares some elements with Norse mythology, possibly from early contacts with Viking traders. Among the Sámi were the last worshippers of Thor, as late as the 18th century, according to contemporary ethnographers. Through a mainly French initiative from Joseph Paul Gaimard as part of his La Recherche Expedition, Lars Levi Læstadius began research on Sámi mythology. His work resulted in Fragments of Lappish Mythology, since by his own admission, they contained only a small percentage of what had existed. The fragments were termed Theory of Gods, Theory of Sacrifice, Theory of Prophecy, or short reports about rumorous Sami magic and Sami sagas. Generally, he claims to have filtered out the Norse influence and derived common elements among the South, North, and Eastern Sámi groups. The mythology has common elements with other Indigenous religions as well, such as those of Indigenous peoples in Siberia and North America.

==== Christian mission ====
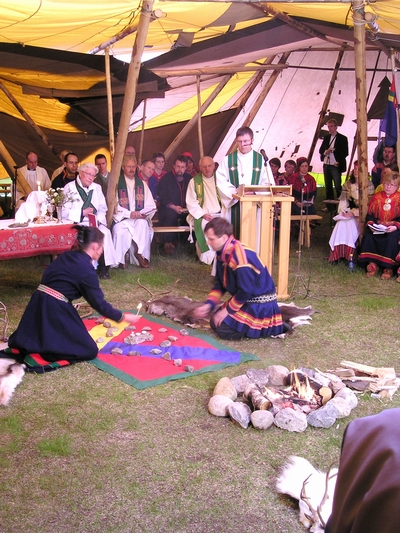
A sermon at the 2004 Samiske kirkedager

The term Sámi religion usually refers to the traditional religion, practiced by most Sámi until approximately the 18th century. Christianity was introduced by Roman Catholic missionaries as early as the 13th century. Increased pressure came after the Protestant Reformation, and rune drums were burned or sent to museums abroad. In this period, many Sámi practiced their traditional religion at home while going to church on Sunday. Since the Sámi were considered to possess powers of "witchcraft," they were often accused of sorcery during the 17th century and were the subjects of witch trials and burnings.

In Norway, a major effort to convert the Sámi was made around 1720, when Thomas von Westen, the "Apostle of the Sámi," burned drums and sacred objects and converted people. Out of the estimated thousands of drums before this period, only about 70 are known to remain, scattered in museums around Europe. Sacred sites were destroyed, such as sieidi, álda, sáivu, springs, caves, and other natural formations where offerings were made.

==== Laestadius ====
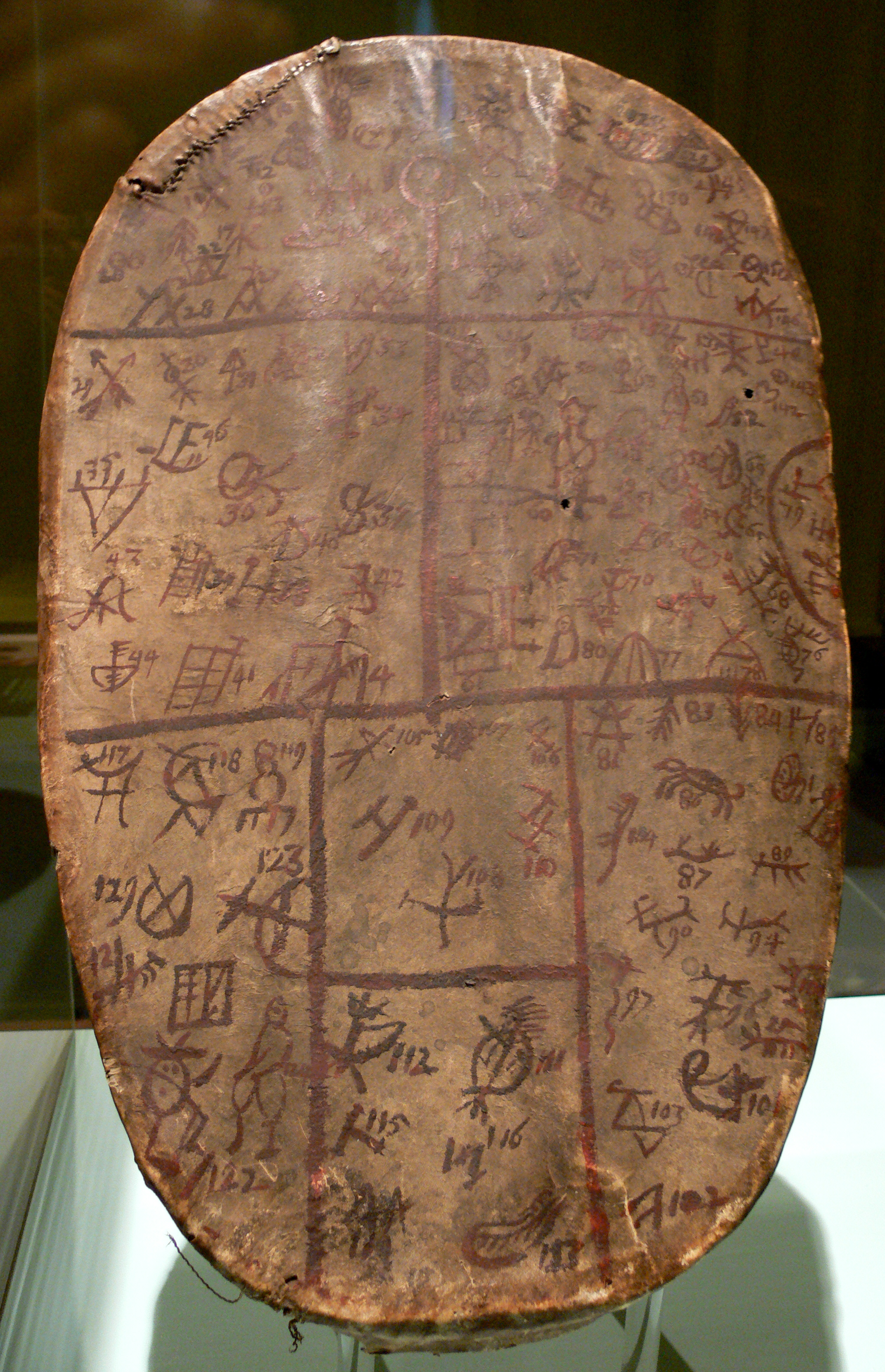
Noaidi drum

Around 1840, Swedish Sámi Lutheran pastor and administrator Lars Levi Laestadius initiated among the Sámi a puritanical pietist movement emphasizing complete abstinence from alcohol. This movement is still very dominant in Sámi-speaking areas. Laestadius, who spoke many languages, became fluent and preached in Finnish and Northern Sámi in addition to his native Southern Sámi and Swedish, the language he used for scholarly publications.

Two great challenges Laestadius had faced since his early days as a minister were the indifference of his Sámi parishioners, who had been forced by the Swedish government to convert from their shamanistic religion to Lutheranism, and the misery alcoholism caused them. The spiritual understanding Laestadius acquired and shared in his new sermons "filled with vivid metaphors from the lives of the Sámi that they could understand, ... about a God who cared about the lives of the people" had a profound positive effect on both problems. One account from a Sámi cultural perspective recalls a new desire among the Sámi to learn to read and a "bustle and energy in the church, with people confessing their sins, crying and praying for forgiveness ... [Alcohol abuse] and the theft of [the Sámis'] reindeer diminished, which had a positive influence on the Sámi's relationships, finances and family life."

==== Neo-shamanism and traditional healing ====
A number of Sámi seek to return to the traditional pagan values of their ancestors. There are also some Sámi who claim to be noaidi and offer their services through newspaper advertisements, in New Age arrangements, or for tourist groups. While they practice a religion based on that of their ancestors, widespread anti-pagan prejudice has caused these shamans to be generally not viewed as part of an unbroken Sámi religious tradition.

Traditional Sámi beliefs are composed of three intertwining elements: animism, shamanism, and polytheism. Sámi animism is manifested in the Sámi belief that all significant natural objects (animals, plants, rocks, etc.) possess a soul. From a polytheistic perspective, traditional Sámi beliefs include a multitude of spirits. Many contemporary practitioners are compared to practitioners of neo-paganism, since a number of neopagan religions likewise combine elements of ancient pagan religions with more-recent revisions or innovations. Others feel they are attempting to revive or reconstruct Indigenous Sámi religions as found in historic and folkloric sources and oral traditions.

In 2012, County Governor of Troms approved Shamanic Association of Tromsø as a new religion.

A very different religious idea is represented by the numerous "wise men" and "wise women" found throughout the Sámi area. They often offer to heal the sick through rituals and traditional medicines and may also combine traditional elements, such as older Sámi teachings, with newer monotheistic inventions that Christian missionaries taught their ancestors, such as readings from the Bible.

=== Duodji (craft) ===
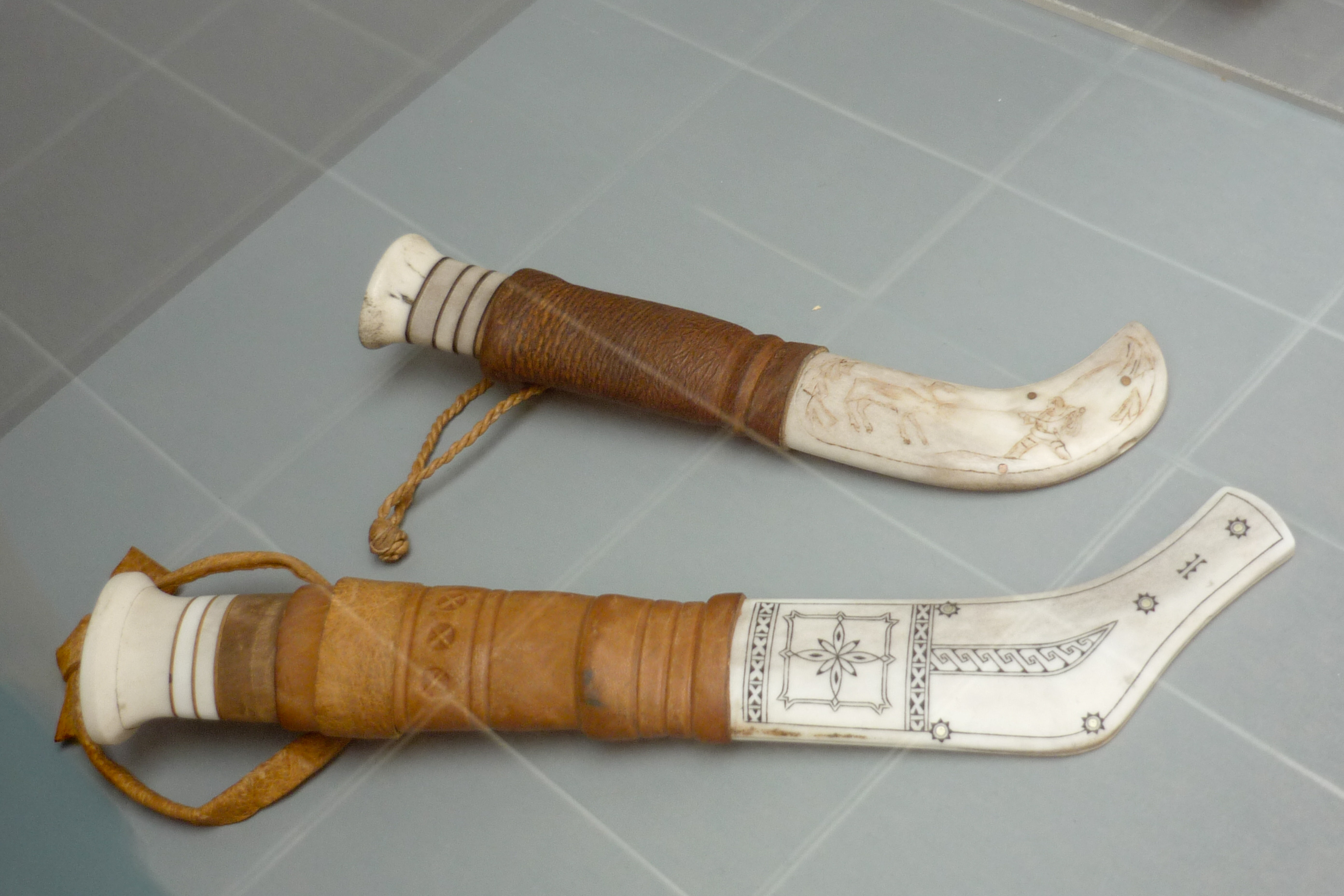
Sámi knives

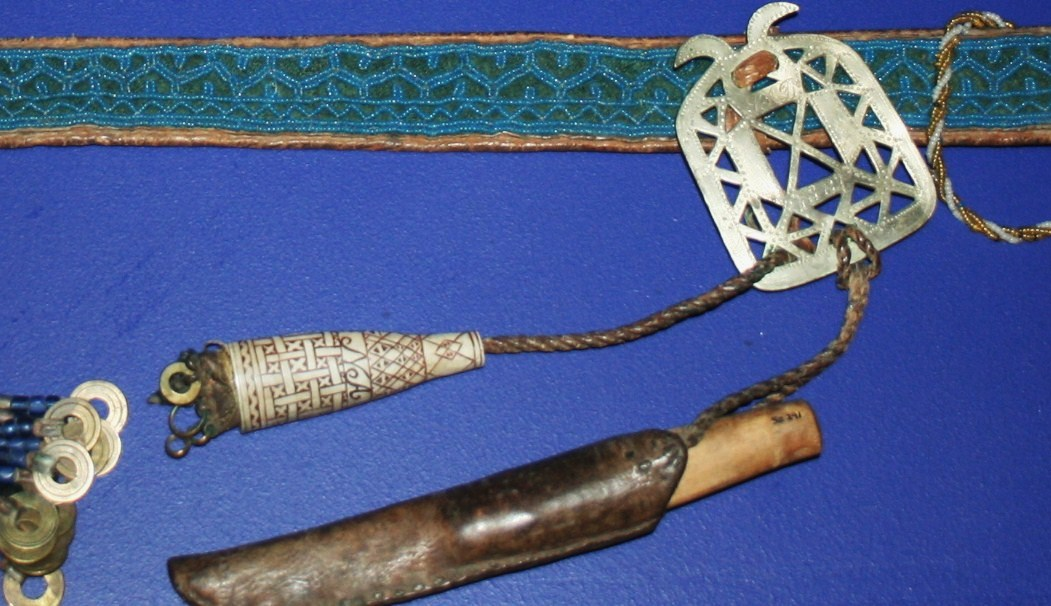
Beaded belt, knife, and antler needlecase

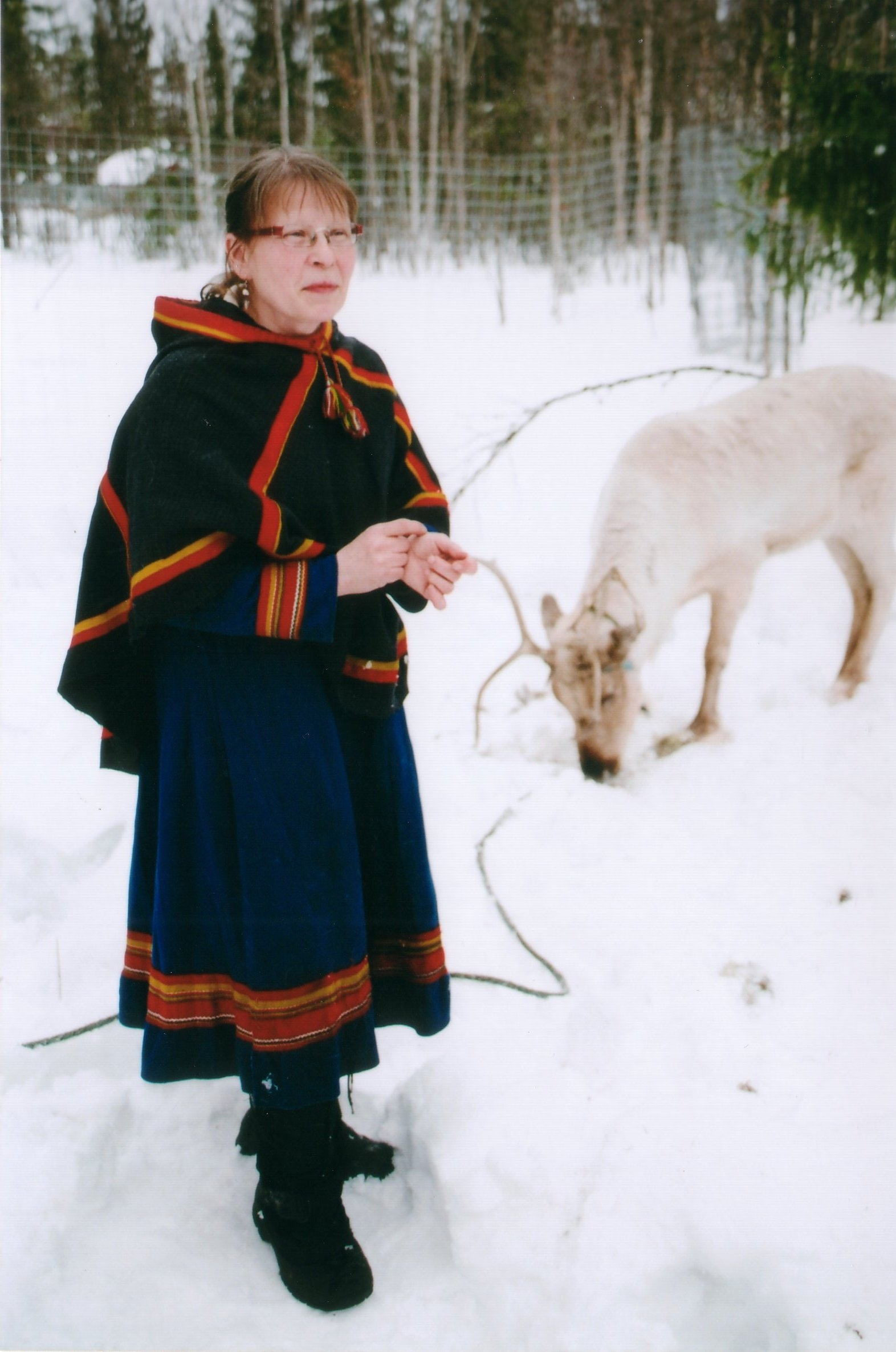
Sámi woman from Sweden

Duodji, the Sámi handicraft, originates from the Sámi's heritage as self-supporting nomads, believing therefore that an object should first and foremost serve a purpose rather than being primarily decorative. Men mostly use wood, bone, and antlers to make items such as antler-handled scrimshawed Sámi knives, drums, and guksi (burl cups). Women used leather and roots to make items such as gákti (clothing) and baskets woven from birch and spruce roots.

=== Clothing ===
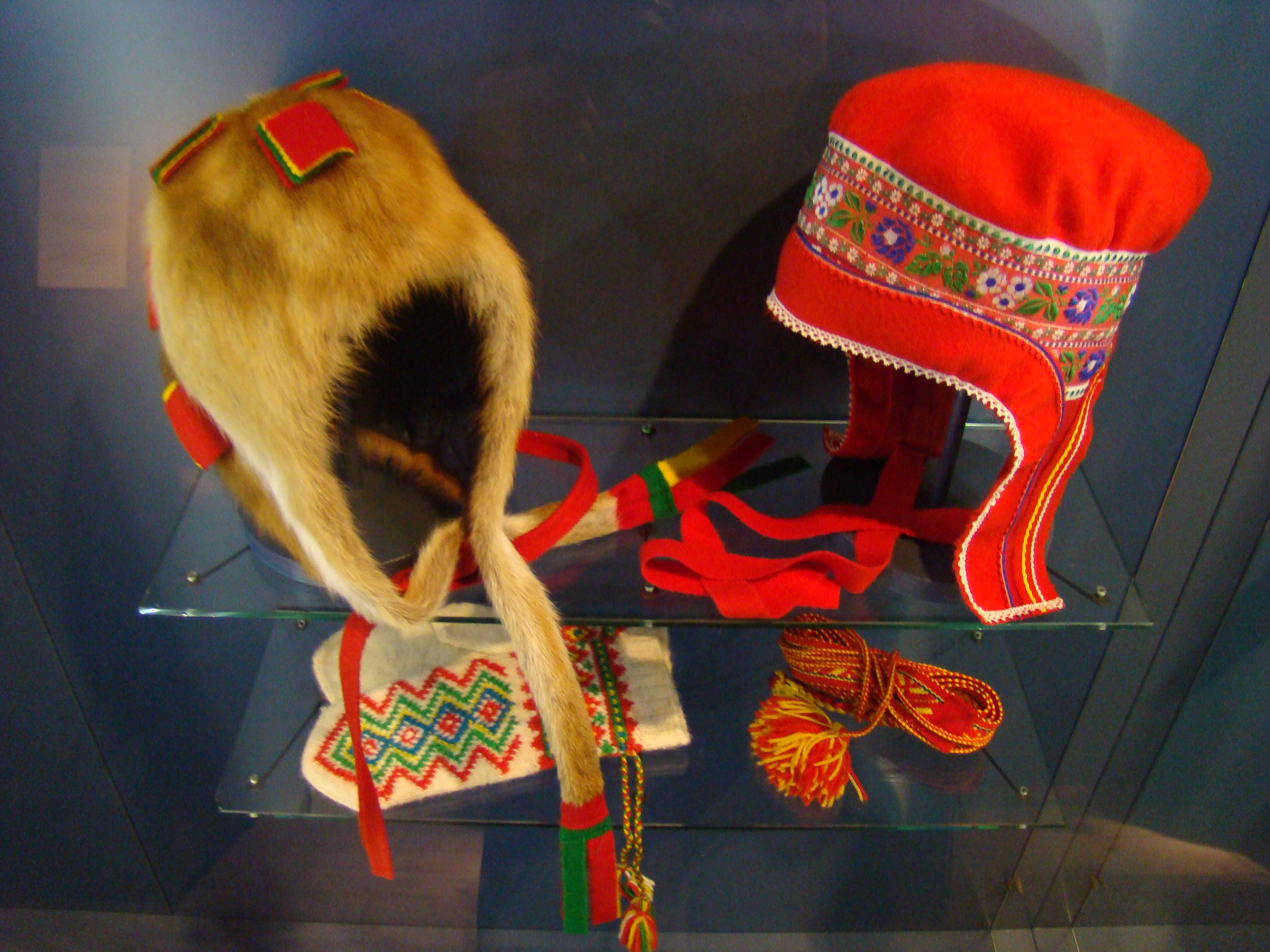
Sámi hats

Gákti is the traditional clothing worn by the Sámi people. It is worn both in ceremonial contexts and while working, particularly when herding reindeer.

Traditionally, gákti was made from reindeer leather and sinews, but nowadays it is more common to use wool, cotton, or silk. Women's gákti typically consist of a dress, a fringed shawl that is fastened with one to three silver brooches, and boots/shoes made of reindeer fur or leather. Sámi boots (nutukas) can have pointed or curled toes and often have band-woven ankle wraps. Eastern Sámi boots are made of reindeer fur and lined with felt; they have ornamental beads and a rounded toe. Men's gákti have a shorter "jacket-skirt" than a women's long dress. Traditional gákti are most commonly in variations of red, blue, green, white, medium-brown–tanned leather, or reindeer fur. In winter, there is the addition of a reindeer fur coat and leggings, and sometimes a poncho (luhkka) and rope/lasso.

The colours, patterns, and jewellery of the gákti indicate where the wearer is from, if they are single or married, and sometimes even their family. The collar, sleeves, and hem usually have appliqués in the form of geometric shapes. In some regions the gákti have ribbonwork, in others they have tin embroidery, and some Eastern Sámi have beading on collars or other clothing. Hats vary by sex, season, and region; they can be wool, leather, or fur. They can be embroidered; in the East, they are more like a beaded cloth crown with a shawl. Some traditional shamanic headgear had animal hides, plaits, and feathers, particularly in East Sápmi.

The gákti can be worn with a belt, which may be band-woven and/or beaded. Leather belts can have scrimshawed antler buttons, silver concho-like buttons, tassels, or brass/copper details such as rings. In addition, beaded leather pouches, antler needlecases, accessories for fire building, copper rings, amulets, and often a carved or scrimshawed antler-handled knife may be suspended from belts. Some Eastern Sámi also wear a hooded jumper (малиц) made of wool-lined reindeer skins above knee boots.

=== Media and literature ===
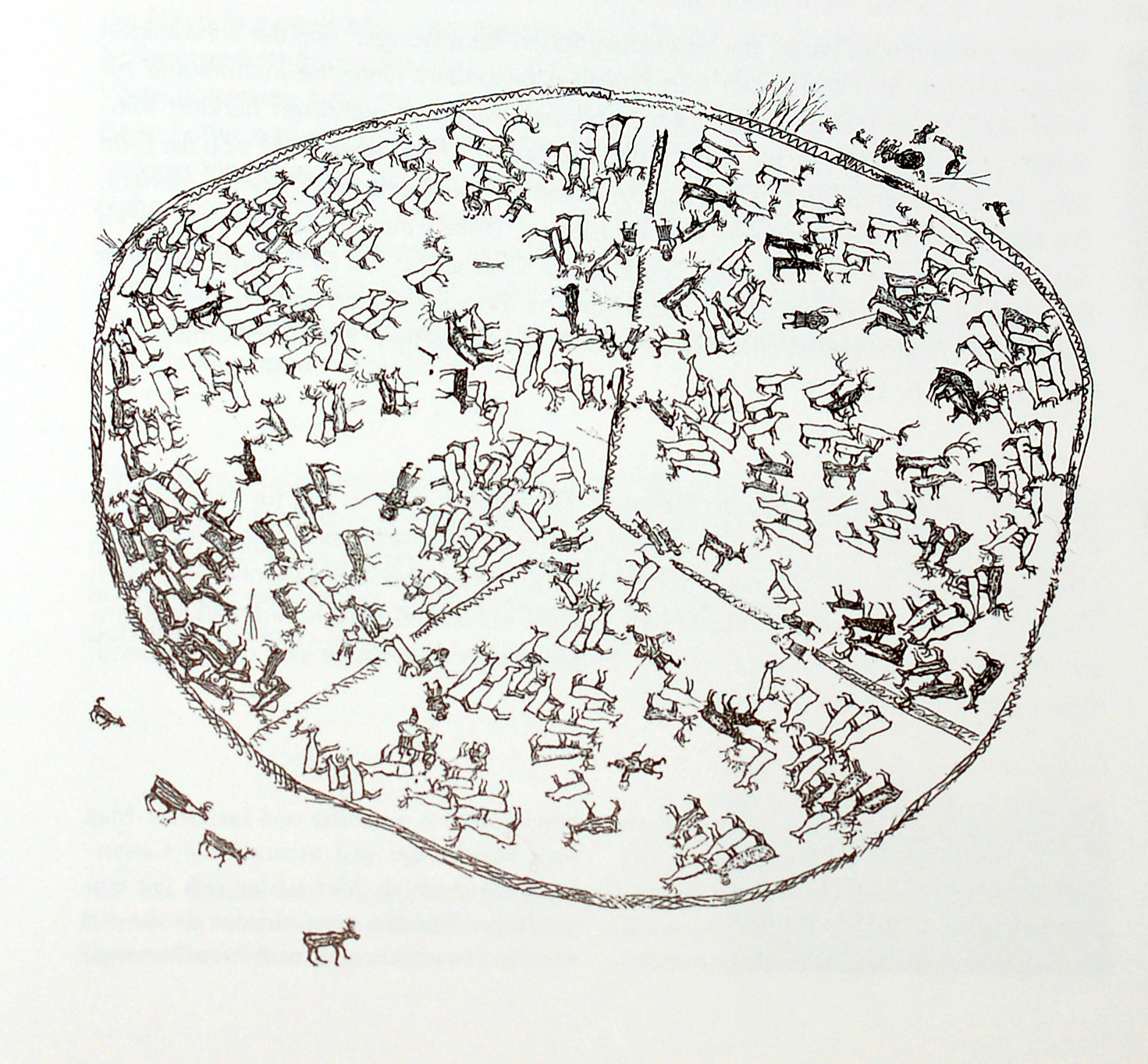
Johan Turi's illustration of reindeer herding from his 1910 book Muitalus sámiid birra (An Account of the Sámi), the first book published in a Sámi language

- Short daily news bulletins in Northern Sámi are broadcast on national television in Norway, Sweden, and Finland. Children's television shows in Sámi are also frequently made. There is also a radio station for Northern Sámi that offers news programs in the other Sámi languages.
- A single daily newspaper, Ávvir, and a few magazines are published in Northern Sámi.
- There is a Sámi theatre, Beaivvaš, in Kautokeino on the Norwegian side, as well as one in Kiruna on the Swedish side. Both theatre companies tour the entire Sámi area with dramas written by Sámi authors or international translations.
- A number of novels and poetry collections are published every year in Northern Sámi, and sometimes in the other Sámi languages as well. The largest Sámi publishing house is Davvi Girji.
- The first secular book published in a Sámi language was Johan Turi's Muitalus sámiid birra (An Account of the Sámi), released in 1910 with text in Northern Sámi and Danish.
- In 2023 Sámi author Ann-Helén Laestadius wrote Stolen, a novel of the Sámi in Sweden. It was adapted into a Netflix film of the same name in 2024.

=== Technology ===
Traditional Sámi technology reflects adaptation to Arctic and subarctic environments. For reindeer migration and hunting, the lavvu is a temporary conical tent similar in structure to the tipi. The pulk, a boat-shaped sled pulled by reindeer or skiers, remains in use for winter transport. Rock carvings at Alta depicting skiers date to 4,000–5,000 years ago. The runebomme (drum) featured painted cosmological symbols and was used in traditional religious practice before Christian missionization led to their systematic destruction.

=== Music ===
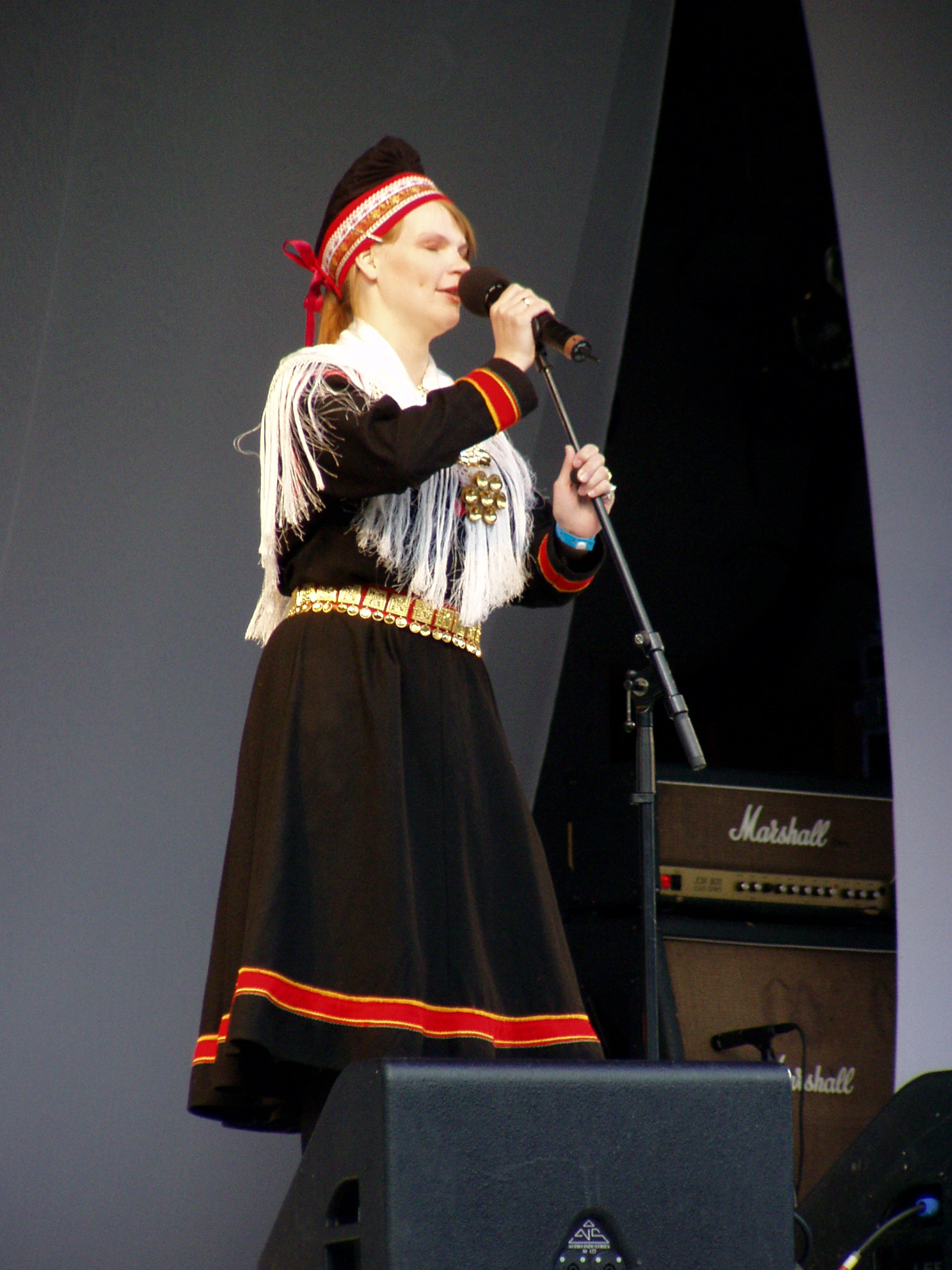
Sara Marielle Gaup at Riddu Riđđu

A characteristic feature of Sámi musical tradition is the singing of joik. Joiks are song-chants and are traditionally sung a cappella, usually slowly and deep in the throat with apparent sorrow or anger. Joiks can be dedicated to animals and birds, specific people, or special occasions, and they can be joyous, sad, or melancholic. They often are based on syllablic improvisation. The only traditional Sámi instruments that were sometimes used to accompany joik are the fadno, a flute made from reed-like Angelica archangelica stems, and hand drums (frame drums and bowl drums). In recent years, other musical instruments have been more frequently used as accompaniment to joiks.

=== Education ===
Education with Sámi as the first language is available in all four countries and also outside the Sámi area. Sámi University College is located in Kautokeino. Sámi languages are studied in several universities in all countries, most notably the University of Tromsø, which considers Sámi a mother tongue, not a foreign language.

=== Festivals ===
Numerous Sámi festivals throughout the Sápmi area celebrate different aspects of Sámi culture. The best known on the Norwegian side is Riddu Riđđu, though there are others, such as Ijahis Idja in Inari. Among the most festive are the Easter festivals in Kautokeino Municipality and Karasjok Municipality before the springtime reindeer migration to the coast. These combine traditional culture with modern phenomena such as snowmobile races. Also celebrated is the new year, known as Ođđajagemánnu. Shamanic culture is celebrated at the Isogaisa Festival in Tennevoll, Norway.

=== Visual arts ===
In addition to duodji, there is a developing area of contemporary Sámi visual art. Galleries such as Sámi Dáiddaguovddáš (Sami Center for Contemporary Art) are being established.

=== Dance ===
Unlike many other Indigenous peoples, traditional dance is generally not a visible manifestation of Sámi identity. This has led to a common misconception that Sámi, at least in western Sápmi, have no traditional dance culture.

The Sámi modern dance company Kompani Nomad looked to old descriptions of shamanistic rituals and behaviors to identify "lost" Sámi dances and reimagine them through contemporary dance. An example is the lihkadus (ecstasy dance) described in sources from the 16th and 17th centuries, which was adapted by Laestadius, who brought it and other Sámi traditions into the Church of Sweden as part of the Laestadianism movement.

Partner and group dancing have been a part of Skolt Sámi culture and among Sámi on the Kola Peninsula since at least the second half of the 1800s. These square dances, couples dances, circle dances, and singing games are influenced by Karelian and Northern Russian dance cultures, likely under the influence of Russian traders, military service under the tsar, and the Russian Orthodox Church. This eastern Sápmi dance tradition has been more continuous and has been adapted by modern Sámi dance companies such as Johtti Kompani.

=== Reindeer husbandry ===
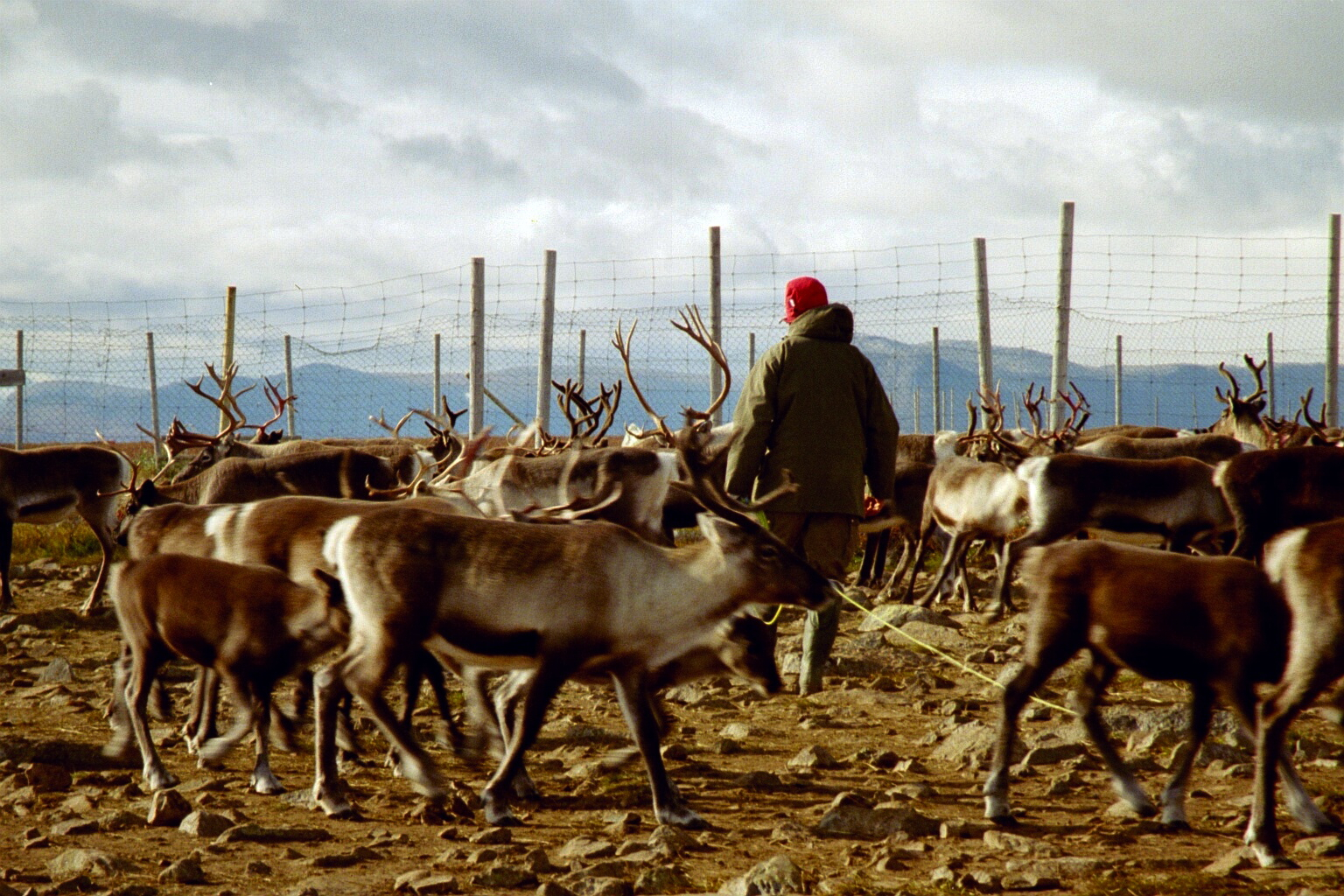
Reindeer herding

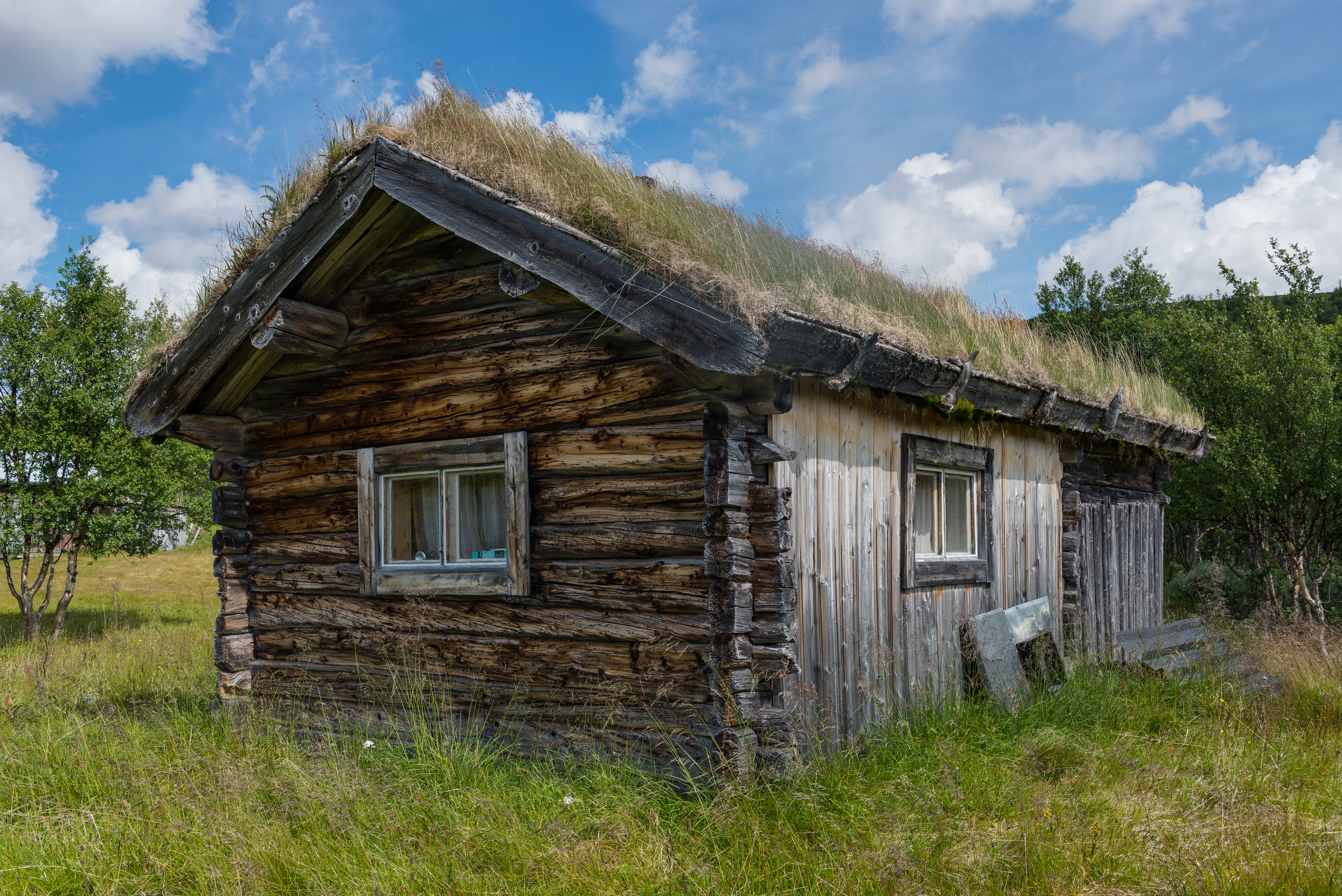
Building in Ljungris, owned by the Sámi community and used especially for reindeer calf marking in the summer

Reindeer husbandry has been and still is an important aspect of Sámi culture. Traditionally, the Sámi lived and worked in reindeer-herding groups called siidat, which consisted of several families and their herds. Members of the siida helped each other with the management and husbandry of the herds. During the years of forced assimilation, the areas in which reindeer herding was an important livelihood were among the few where the Sámi culture and language survived.

In Norway and Sweden, reindeer husbandry is legally protected as an exclusive Sámi livelihood, such that only persons of Sámi descent with a linkage to a reindeer-herding family can own, and hence make a living off, reindeer. Presently, about 2,800 people are engaged in reindeer herding in Norway. In Finland, reindeer husbandry is not exclusive and is also practiced to a limited degree by ethnic Finns. Legally, it is restricted to EU/EEA nationals resident in the area. In the north (Lapland), it plays a major role in the local economy, while its economic impact is lesser in the southern parts of the area (Province of Oulu).

Among reindeer herders in Sámi villages, the women usually have a higher level of formal education.

=== Games ===
The Sámi have traditionally played both card games and board games, but few Sámi games have survived because Christian missionaries and Laestadianists considered such games sinful. The rules of only three Sámi board games have been preserved into modern times:

- Sáhkku is a running-fight board game where each player controls a set of soldiers (referred to as "women" and "men") that race across a board in a loop, attempting to eliminate the other player's soldiers. The game is related to South Scandinavian daldøs, Arabian tâb, and Indian tablan. Sáhkku differs from these games in several respects, most notably the addition of a piece, "the king," that changes gameplay radically.
- Tablut is a pure strategy game in the tafl family. The game features "Swedes" and a "Swedish king" whose goal is to escape, and an army of "Muscovites" whose goal is to capture the king. Tablut is the only tafl game for which a relatively intact set of rules have survived into our time. Therefore, all modern versions of tafl (commonly called "Hnefatafl" and marketed exclusively as "Norse" or "Viking" games) are based on the Sámi game of tablut.
- Dablot Prejjesne is a game related to alquerque that differs from most such games (e.g., draughts) by having pieces of three different ranks. The game's two sides are referred to as "Sámi" (king, prince, warriors) and "Finlenders" (landowners, landowner's son, farmers).

== Cultural region ==
Sápmi is located in Northern Europe, includes the northern parts of Fennoscandia, and spans four countries: Norway, Sweden, Finland, and Russia. Non-Sámi and many regional maps have often called this same region Lapland, since there is considerable regional overlap between Sápmi and the provinces of Lappland in Sweden and Lapland in Finland. However, much of Sápmi falls outside of those provinces. Despite the term's use in tourism, Lapland can be misleading, offensive, or both to Sámi, depending on context and area. Among the Sámi, Sápmi is strictly used and acceptable.

=== Extent ===
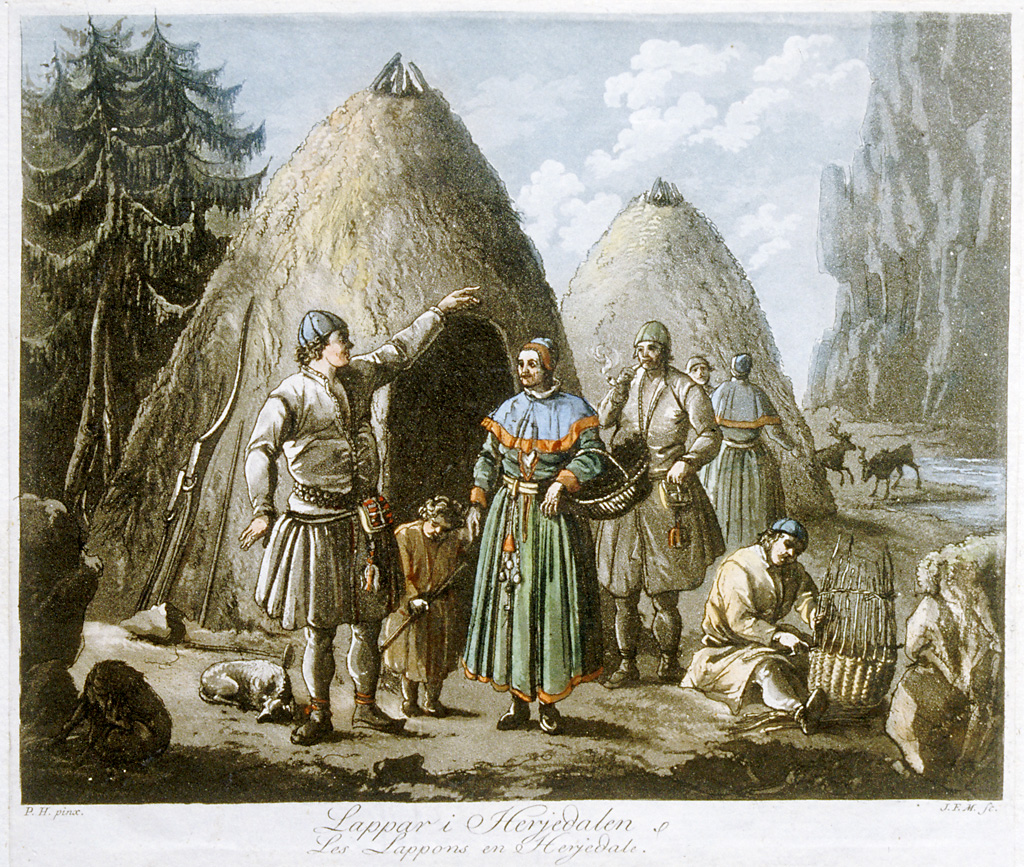
Sámi people in Härjedalen (1790–1800), far south in the Sápmi area

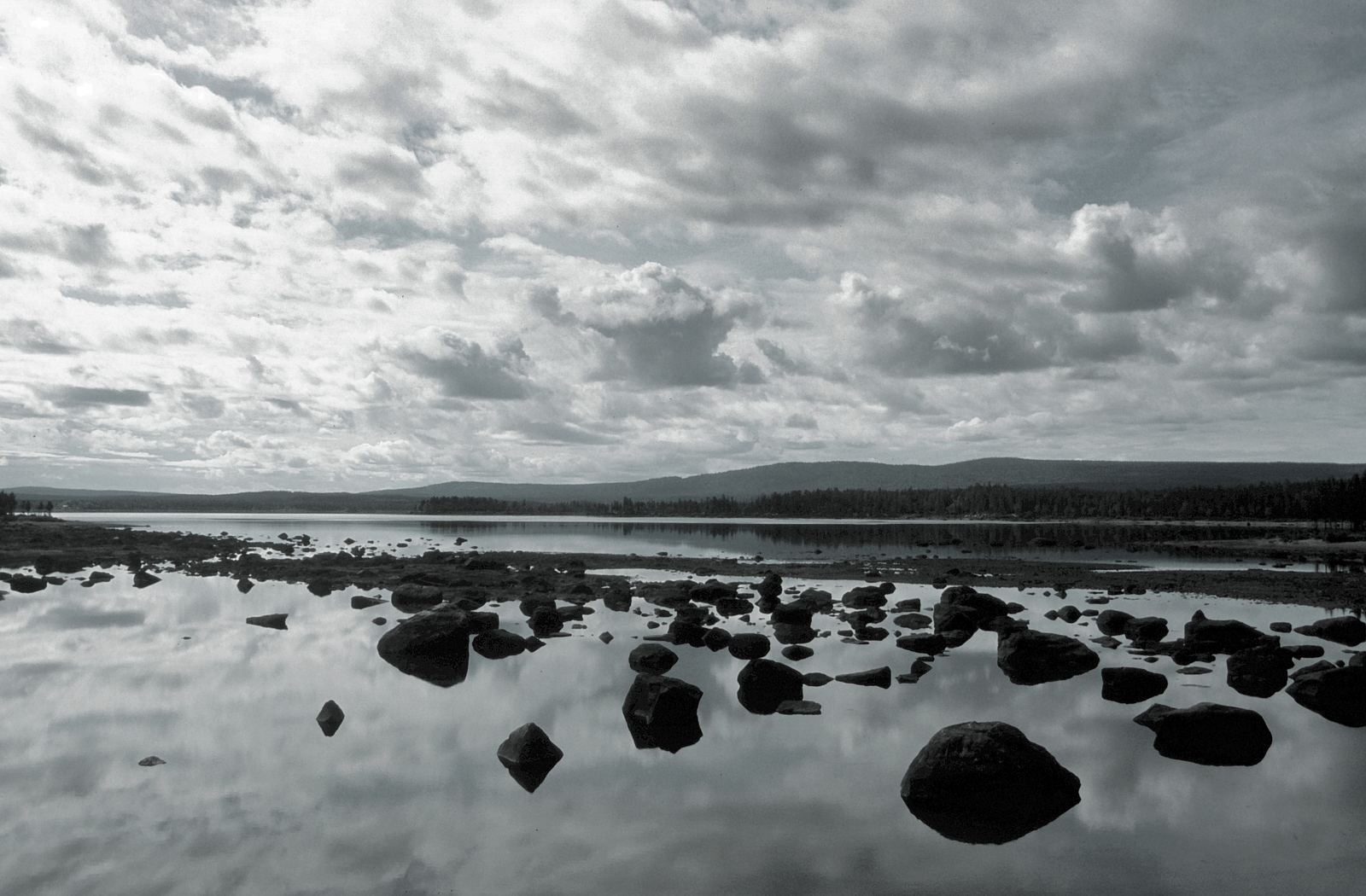
Laponian area in Sápmi, UNESCO World Heritage Site

There is no official geographic definition for the boundaries of Sápmi. However, the following counties and provinces are usually included:

- Finnmark County in Norway
- Jämtland County in Sweden
- Lapland region in Finland
- Murmansk Oblast in Russia
- Nord-Trøndelag County in Norway
- Nordland County in Norway
- Norrbotten County in Sweden
- Troms County in Norway
- Västerbotten County in Sweden

The municipalities of Gällivare, Jokkmokk, and Arjeplog in Swedish Lappland were designated a UNESCO World Heritage Site in 1996 as a "Laponian Area."

The Sámi Domicile Area in Finland consists of the municipalities of Enontekiö, Utsjoki, and Inari, as well as a part of the municipality of Sodankylä. About 3,000 of Finland's roughly 10,000 Sámi speak Sámi as their mother tongue. A considerable proportion of Finnish Sámi live outside the Sápmi region. For example, Helsinki has a relatively large and active Sámi minority. According to the Sámi Parliament, the Sámi live in 230 out of a total of 336 municipalities in Finland. 75% of Sámi under the age of 10 live outside the Sápmi region.

=== Important Sámi settlements ===
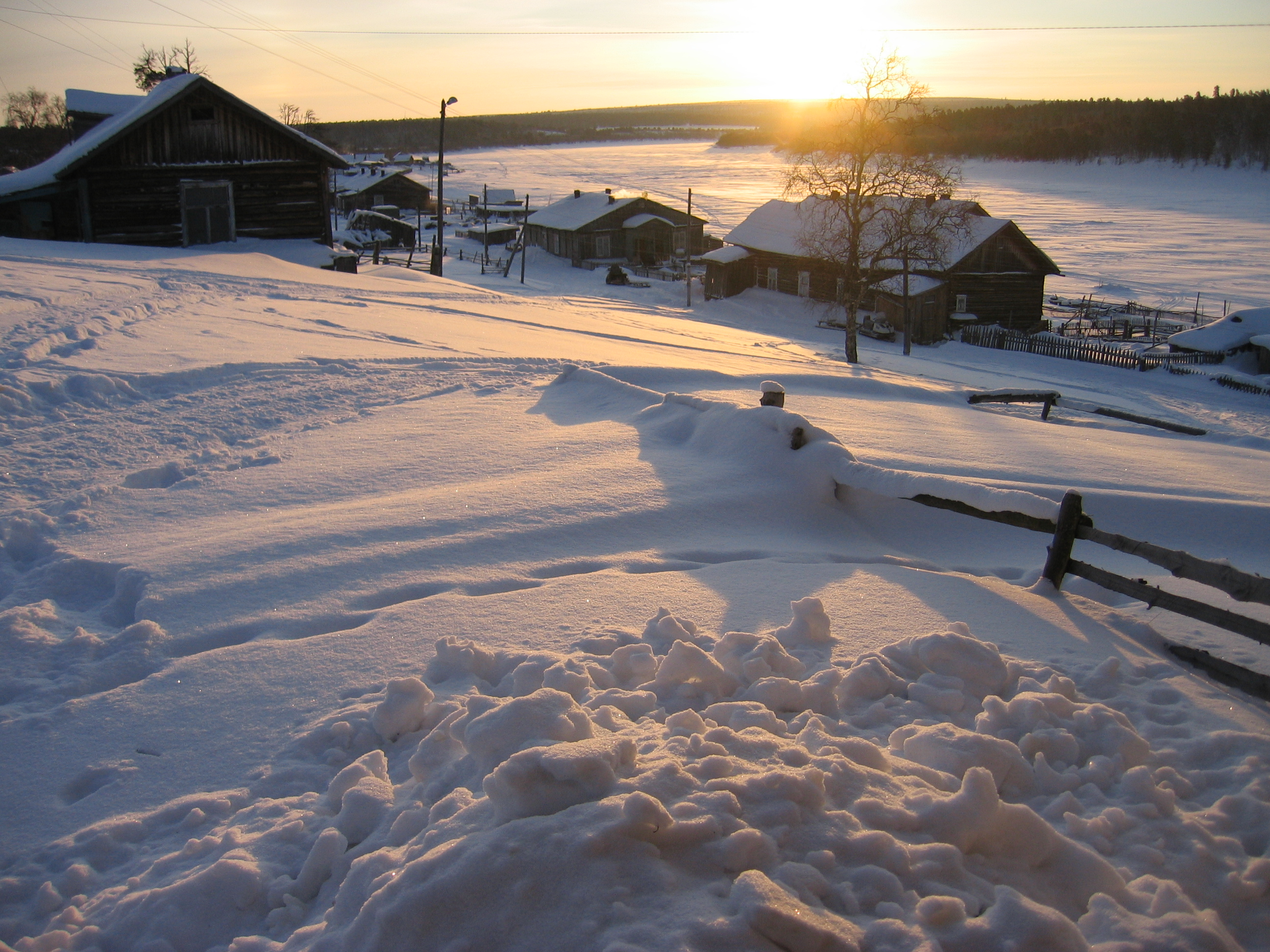
Kanevka, Ponoy River, Russia's Lovozersky District

The following municipalities have significant Sámi populations or host Sámi institutions (Norwegian, Swedish, Finnish, or Russian name in parentheses):

- Aanaar, Anár, or Aanar (Inari) is the location of the Finnish Sámi Parliament, Sajos Sámi Cultural Centre, SAKK – Saamelaisalueen koulutuskeskus (Sámi Education Institute), Anarâškielâ servi (Inari Sámi Language Association), and the Inari Sámi Siida Museum.
- Aarborte (Hattfjelldal) is a southern Sámi center with a Southern-Sámi–language school and a Sámi culture center.
- Árjepluovve (Arjeplog) is the Pite Sámi center in Sweden.
- Deatnu (Tana) has a significant Sámi population.
- Divtasvuodna (Tysfjord) is a center for the Lule Sámi population. The Árran Lule Sámi center is located here.
- Gáivuotna Municipality (Kåfjord, Troms) is an important center for the Sea Sámi culture. Each summer, the Riddu Riđđu festival is held in Gáivuotna. The municipality has a Sámi language center and hosts the Ája Sámi Center. Opposition to Sámi language and culture revitalization in Gáivuotna was infamous in the late 1990s and included Sámi-language road signs being repeatedly shot to pieces.
- Giron (Kiruna), proposed seat of the Swedish Sámi Parliament.
- Guovdageaidnu (Kautokeino) is perhaps the cultural capital of the Sámi. About 90% of the population speaks Sámi. Several Sámi institutions are located there, including Beaivváš Sámi Theatre, a Sámi secondary school and reindeer-herding school, Sámi University College, the Nordic Sámi Research Institute, the Sámi Language Board, the Resource Centre for the Rights of Indigenous People, and the International Centre for Reindeer Husbandry. In addition, Kautokeino is home to several Sámi media organizations, including the Sámi language Áššu newspaper and the DAT Sámi publishing house and record company. Kautokeino also hosts the Sami Easter Festival, which includes the Sámi Grand Prix 2010 (Sámi Musicfestival) and the Reindeer Racing World Cup. The Kautokeino rebellion in 1852 was one of the few Sámi rebellions against the Norwegian government.
- Iänudâh, or Eanodat (Enontekiö)
- Jiellevárri, or Váhčir (Gällivare)
- Jåhkåmåhkke (Jokkmokk) holds a Sámi market on the first weekend of every February and has a Sámi school for language and traditional knowledge called Samij Åhpadusguovdásj.
- Kárášjohka (Karasjok) is the seat of the Norwegian Sámi Parliament. Other important Sámi institutions are located in Kárášjohka, including NRK Sámi Radio, the Sámi Collections museum, the Sámi Art Centre, the Sámi Specialist Library, the Mid-Finnmark legal office, and a child and adolescent psychiatry outpatient clinic (one of few on a national level approved for providing full specialist training). Other significant institutions include the Sámi Specialist Medical Centre and the Sámi Health Research Institute. In addition, the Sápmi cultural park is in the township, and the Sámi language Min Áigi newspaper is published here.
- Leavdnja (Lakselv) in Porsáŋgu (Porsanger) Municipality is the location of the Finnmark Estate and the Ságat Sámi newspaper. The Finnmarkseiendommen organization owns and manages about 95% of the land in Finnmark, and 50% of its board members are elected by the Norwegian Sámi Parliament.
- Луя̄ввьр (Lovozero)
- Staare (Östersund) is the center for Southern Sámi people living in Sweden. It is the site of Gaaltije, a South Sámi museum and a living source of knowledge for South Sámi culture, history, and business. Staare also hosts the Sámi Information Centre and one of the offices to the Sámi Parliament in Sweden.
- Njauddâm is the center for the Skolt Sámi of Norway, who have their own museum, Äʹvv, in the village.
- Ohcejohka (Utsjoki)
- Snåase (Snåsa) is a center for the Southern Sámi language and the only municipality in Norway where Southern Sámi is an official language. The Saemien Sijte Southern Sámi museum is located in Snåase.
- Unjárga (Nesseby), an important center for Sea Sámi culture, is the site of the Várjjat Sámi Museum and the Norwegian Sámi Parliament's department of culture and environment. The first Sámi to be elected to the Norwegian Parliament, Isak Saba, was born there.
- Árviesjávrrie (Arvidsjaur). New settlers from the south of Sweden did not arrive until the second half of the 18th century, which allowed Sámi tradition and culture to be well preserved there. Sámi people living in the south of Norrbotten, Sweden, herd reindeer in the city during the summer, driving the animals to Piteå on the coast for winter.

== Demographics ==
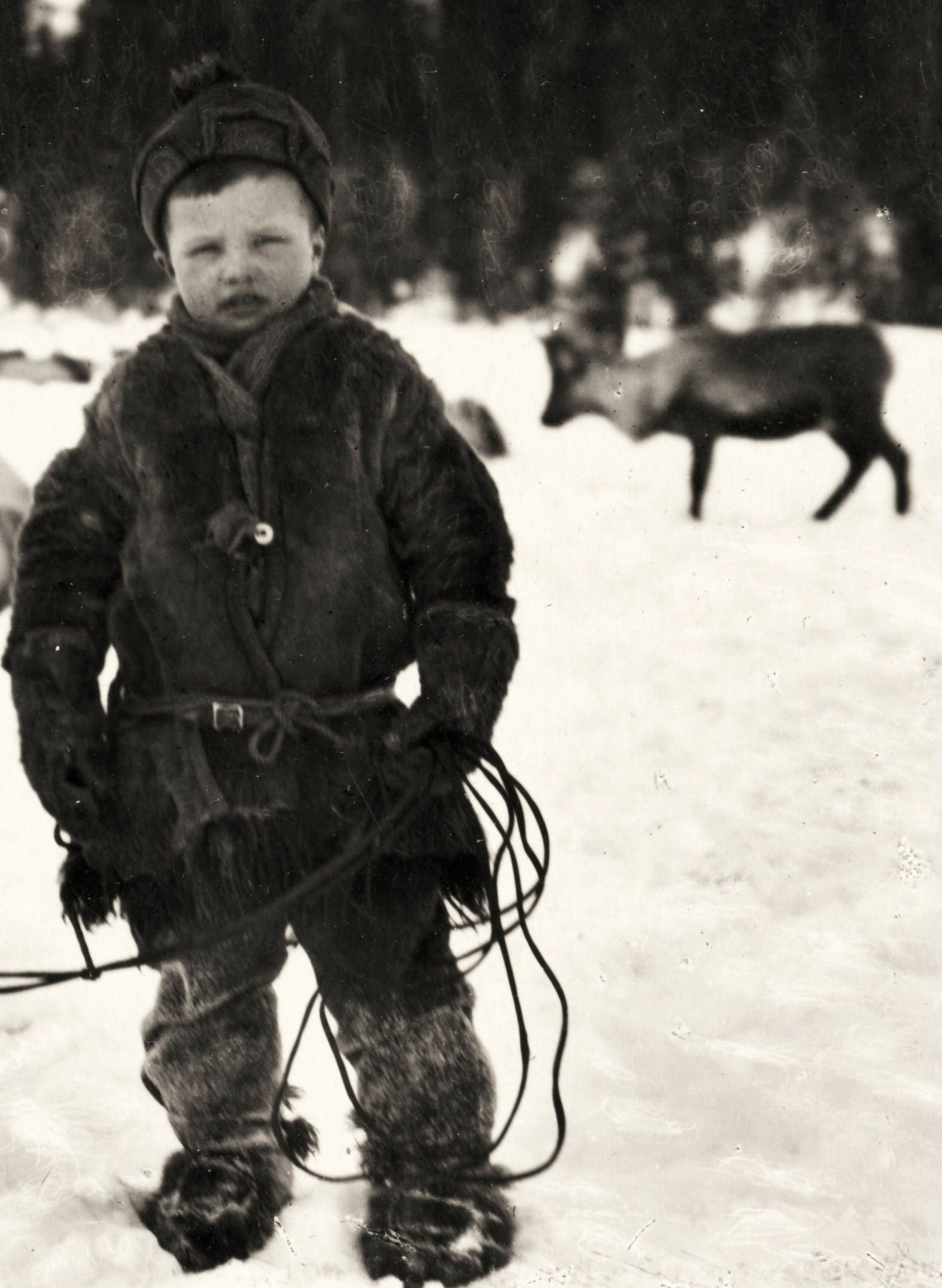
Sámi child, 1923

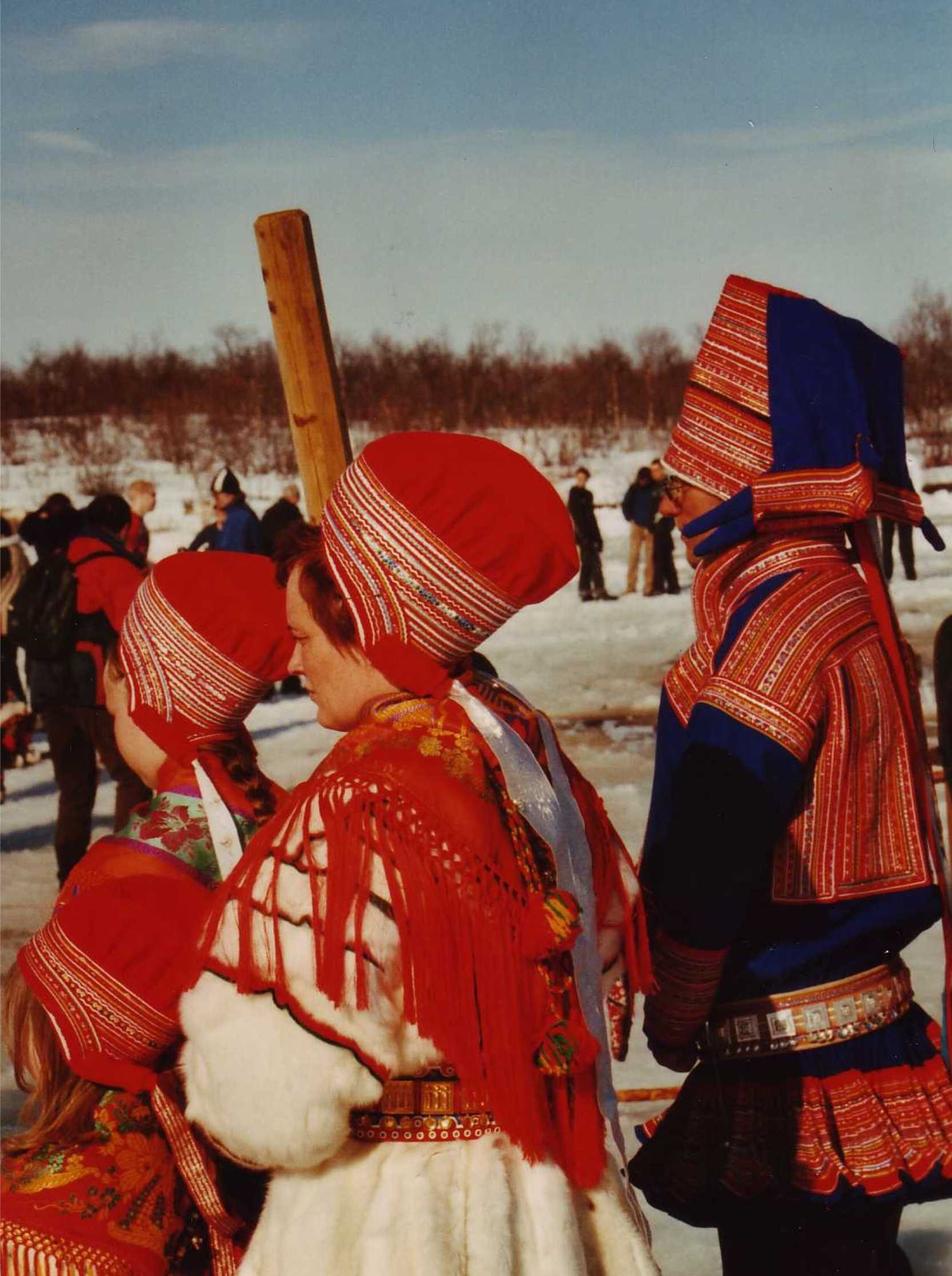
Sámi family at spring celebration

Within the geographical area of Sápmi, the Sámi are a small population. Attempts to count this population are complicated by the relative scarcity of common criteria for "being a Sámi" and by the forced cultural assimilation of the Sámi people by the nation-states in which they live.

There are several Sámi languages and additional dialects, and there are areas in Sapmi where few Sámi speak their native language due to cultural assimilation but still consider themselves Sámi. Other identity markers are kinship (which can be said to, at some level or other, be of high importance for all Sámi), the geographical region of Sápmi where their family came from, or protecting or preserving certain aspects of Sámi culture.

All Nordic Sámi Parliaments have deemed the identity in and of itself to be the "core" criterion for registering as a Sámi: one must declare that one truly considers oneself a Sámi. Objective criteria vary but are generally related to kinship or language.

The Norwegian state recognizes any Norwegian as Sámi if he or she has one great-grandparent whose home language was Sámi, but there is not and has never been any registration of home languages spoken by inhabitants of Norway.

The population has been estimated to be between 80,000 and 135,000 across the whole Nordic region, including urban areas such as Oslo, Norway, traditionally considered outside Sápmi. One estimate of the total Sámi population is about 70,000. (Note: According to the Swedish Sámi parliament.)

Roughly half of all Sámi live in Norway, but many live in Sweden, with smaller groups living in the far north of Finland and in the Kola Peninsula of Russia. The Sámi in Russia were forced by Soviet authorities to relocate to a collective called Lovozero/Lujávri in the central part of the Kola Peninsula.

=== Language ===
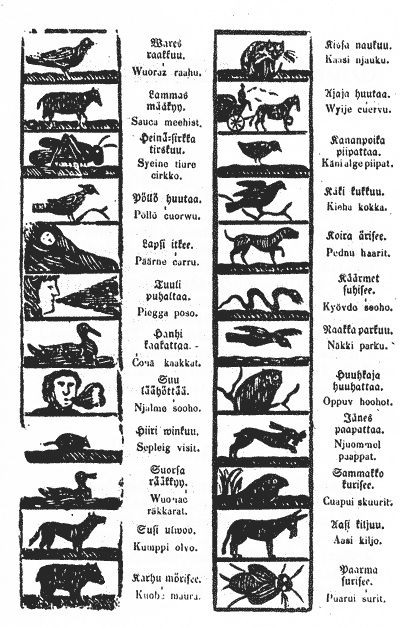
E. W. Borg alphabet book, published in 1859 in Finnish-Inari Sámi

There is no single Sámi language, but a group of ten distinct Sámi languages. Six of these languages have their own written standards. All Sámi languages are relatively closely related but not mutually intelligible; for instance, speakers of Southern Sámi cannot understand Northern Sámi. Most Sámi languages are spoken in several countries because linguistic borders do not correspond to national borders.

All Sámi languages are at some degree of endangerment, ranging from what UNESCO defines as "definitely endangered" to "extinct." This is due in part to historic laws prohibiting the use of Sámi languages in schools and at home in Sweden and Norway. Sámi languages and joiks were illegal in Norway from 1773 until 1958, and access to Sámi instruction as part of schooling was not available until 1988. Governments established residential schools to assimilate the Sámi into the dominant culture; these were originally run by Christian missionaries but were later government controlled. For example, in Russia, Sámi children were taken from their families at age 1–2 and returned at age 15–17 with no knowledge of their language and traditional communities. Not all Sámi viewed the schools negatively, and not all of the schools were abusive. However, being taken from home and prohibited from speaking Sámi has resulted in cultural alienation, language loss, and lowered self-esteem.

The Sámi languages belong to the Uralic language family, linguistically related to Finnish, Estonian, and Hungarian. Due to prolonged contact and import of items foreign to Sámi culture from neighboring Scandinavians, there are a number of Germanic loanwords in Sámi, particularly for "urban" objects.

The majority of the Sámi now speak the majority languages of the countries they live in, i.e., Swedish, Russian, Finnish and Norwegian. Efforts are being made to further the use of Sámi languages among Sámi and persons of Sámi origin. Despite these changes, the legacy of cultural repression still exists. Many older Sámi still refuse to speak Sámi. In addition, Sámi parents still feel alienated from schools and hence do not participate as much as they could in shaping school curricula and policy.

In Norway, the name of the language is samisk, and the name of the people is Same; in Finland, the name of the language is spelled saame and the name of the people saamelainen.

American scientist Michael E. Krauss published in 1997 an estimate of Sámi population and their languages.

Group	Population	Language group	Language	Speakers (1997)	%	Speakers (2010)	Status	Most important territory	Other traditional territories
Northern Sámi	42,500	Western Sámi languages	Northern Sámi language	21,700	51%	30,000	definitely endangered	Norway	Sweden, Finland
Lule Sámi	8,000	Western Sámi languages	Lule Sámi language	2,300	29%	650	severely endangered	Sweden	Norway
Pite Sámi	2,000	Western Sámi languages	Pite Sámi language	60	3%	20	critically endangered	Sweden	Norway
Southern Sámi	1,200	Western Sámi languages	Southern Sámi language	600	50%	500	severely endangered	Sweden	Norway
Ume Sámi	1,000	Western Sámi languages	Ume Sámi language	50	5%	20	critically endangered	Sweden	Norway
Skolt Sámi	1,000	Eastern Sámi languages	Skolt Sámi language	430	43%	300	severely endangered	Finland	Russia, Norway
Kildin Sámi	1,000	Eastern Sámi languages	Kildin Sámi language	650	65%	787	severely endangered	Russia	
Inari Sámi	900	Eastern Sámi languages	Inari Sámi language	300	33%	400	severely endangered	Finland	
Ter Sámi	400	Eastern Sámi languages	Ter Sámi language	8	2%	2	critically endangered	Russia	
Akkala Sámi	100	Eastern Sámi languages	Akkala Sámi language	7	7%	0	extinct	Russia	

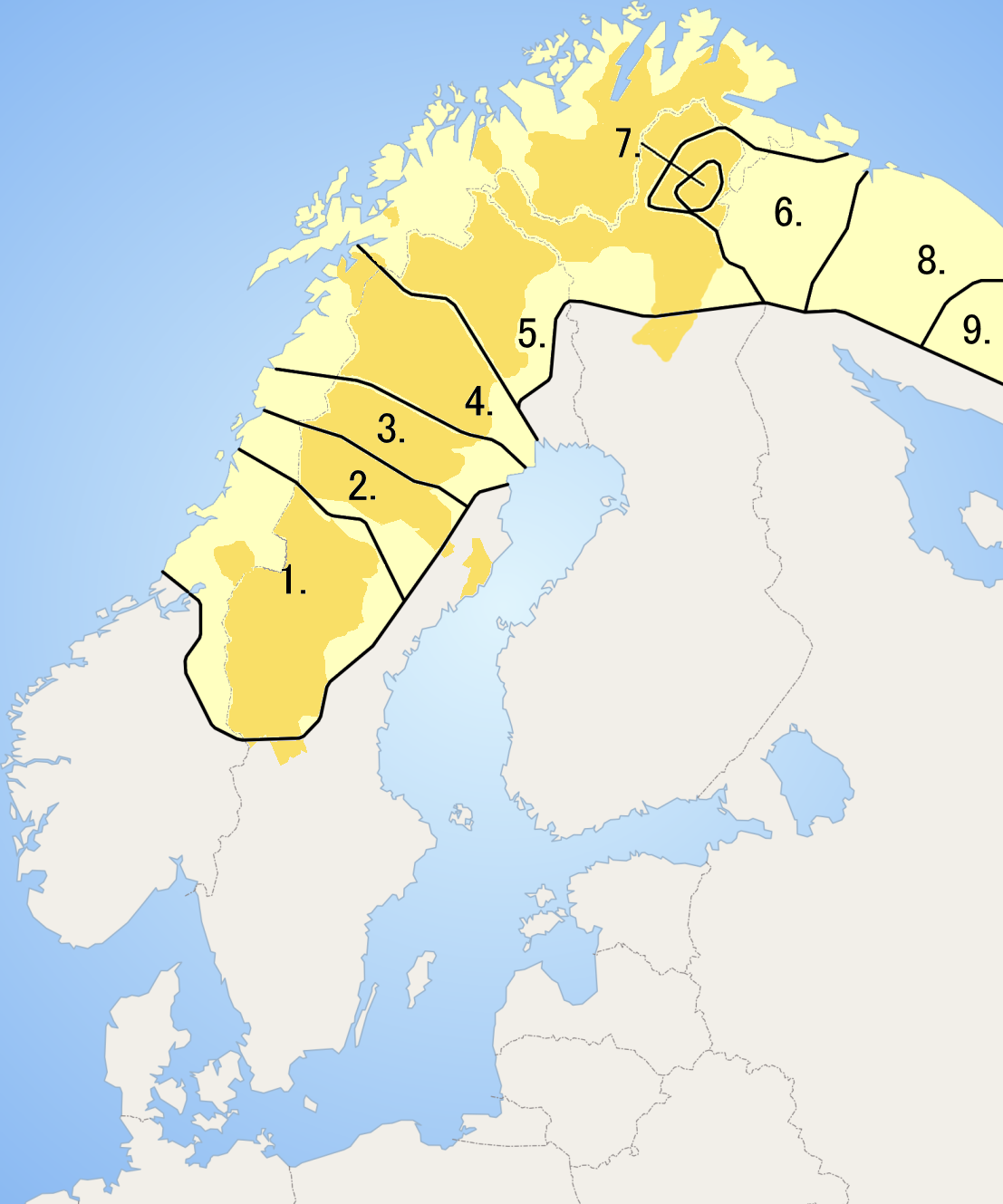
Geographic distribution of the Sámi languages: 1. Southern Sámi; 2. Ume Sámi; 3. Pite Sámi; 4. Lule Sámi; 5. Northern Sámi; 6. Skolt Sámi; 7. Inari Sámi; 8. Kildin Sámi; 9. Ter Sámi; Darkened area represents municipalities that recognize Sámi as an official language.

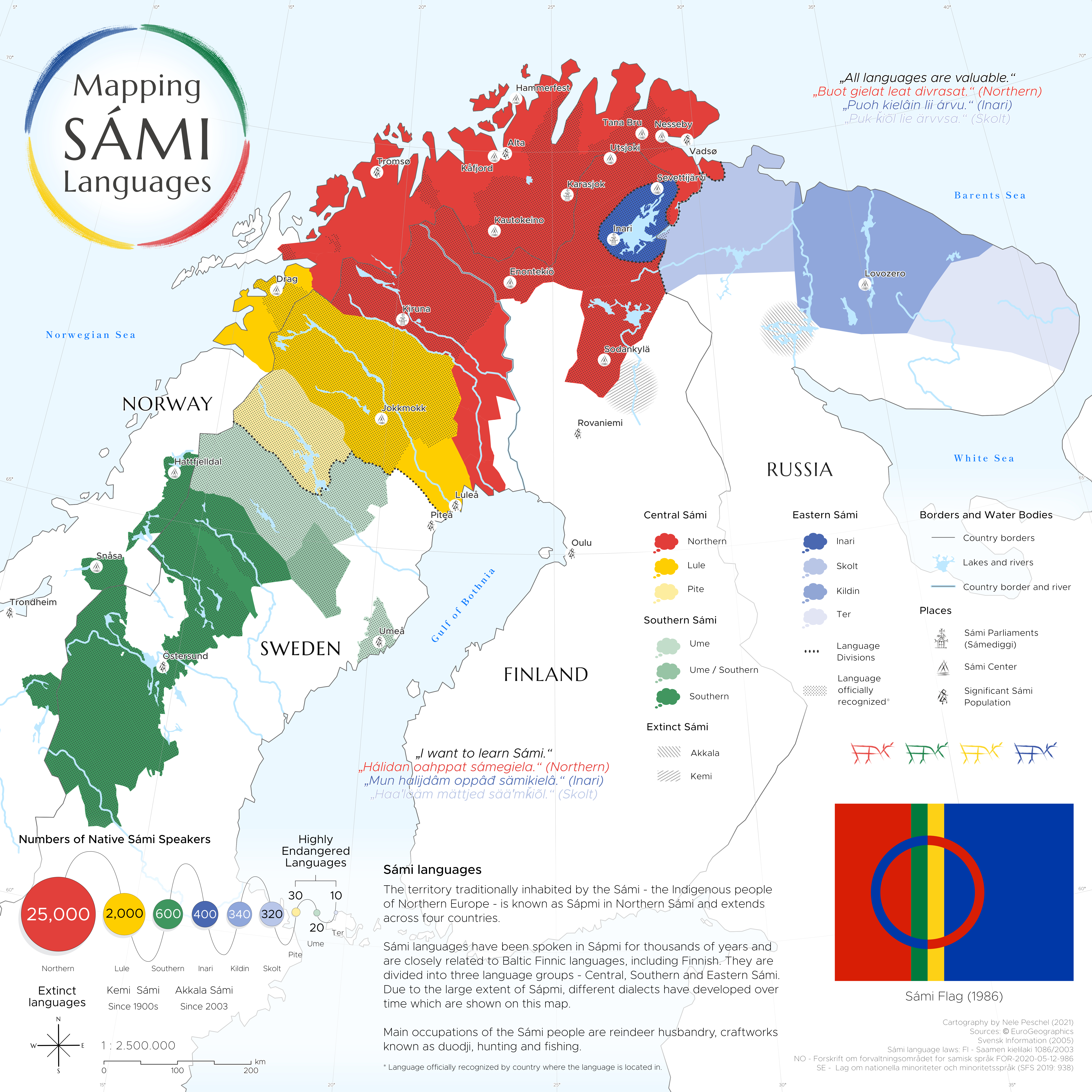
This map shows the geographic distribution of Sámi languages and offers some additional information, such as number of native Sámi speakers and locations of the Sámi parliaments.

The Kemi Sámi language became extinct in the 19th century.

Many Sámi do not speak any of the Sámi languages any more due to historical assimilation policies, so the number of Sámi living in each area is much higher.

=== Division by geography ===
Sápmi is traditionally divided into:

- Eastern Sápmi (Inari, Skolt, Akkala, Kildin, and Teri Sámi in the Kola Peninsula, Russia) and Inari (Finland, formerly also in eastern Norway)
- Northern Sápmi (Northern, Lule, and Pite Sámi in most of northern parts of Norway, Sweden, and Finland)
- Southern Sápmi (Ume and Southern Sámi in central parts of Sweden and Norway)

It should also be noted again that many Sámi now live outside Sápmi, in large cities such as Oslo in Norway.

=== Division by occupation ===
A division often used in Northern Sámi is based on occupation and area of living. This division is also used in many historical texts:

- Reindeer Sámi or Mountain Sámi (in Northern Sámi, boazosapmelash or badjeolmmosh). Previously nomadic Sámi living as reindeer herders. Now most have a permanent residence in the Sámi core areas. Some 10% of Sámi practice reindeer herding, which is seen as a fundamental part of a Sámi culture and, in some parts of the Nordic countries, can be practiced by Sámis only.
- Sea Sámi (in Northern Sámi, mearasapmelash). These people lived traditionally by combining fishing and small-scale farming. The term is often used for all Sámi from the coast, regardless of their occupation.
- Forest Sámi, who traditionally lived by combining fishing in inland rivers and lakes with small-scale reindeer-herding.
- City Sámi, who are now probably the largest group of Sámi.

=== Division by country ===
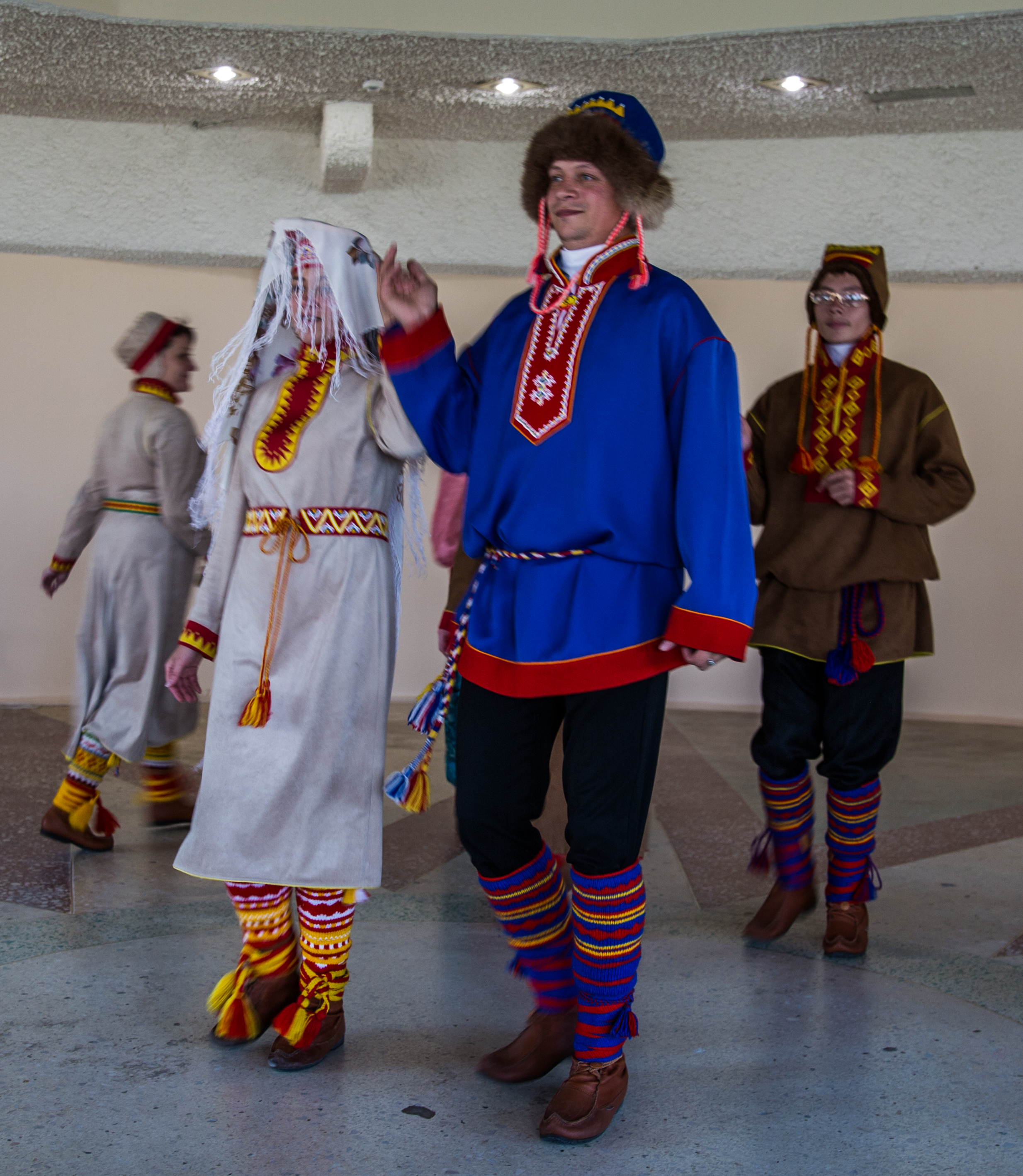
Sámi traditional presentation in Lovozero, Kola Peninsula, Russia

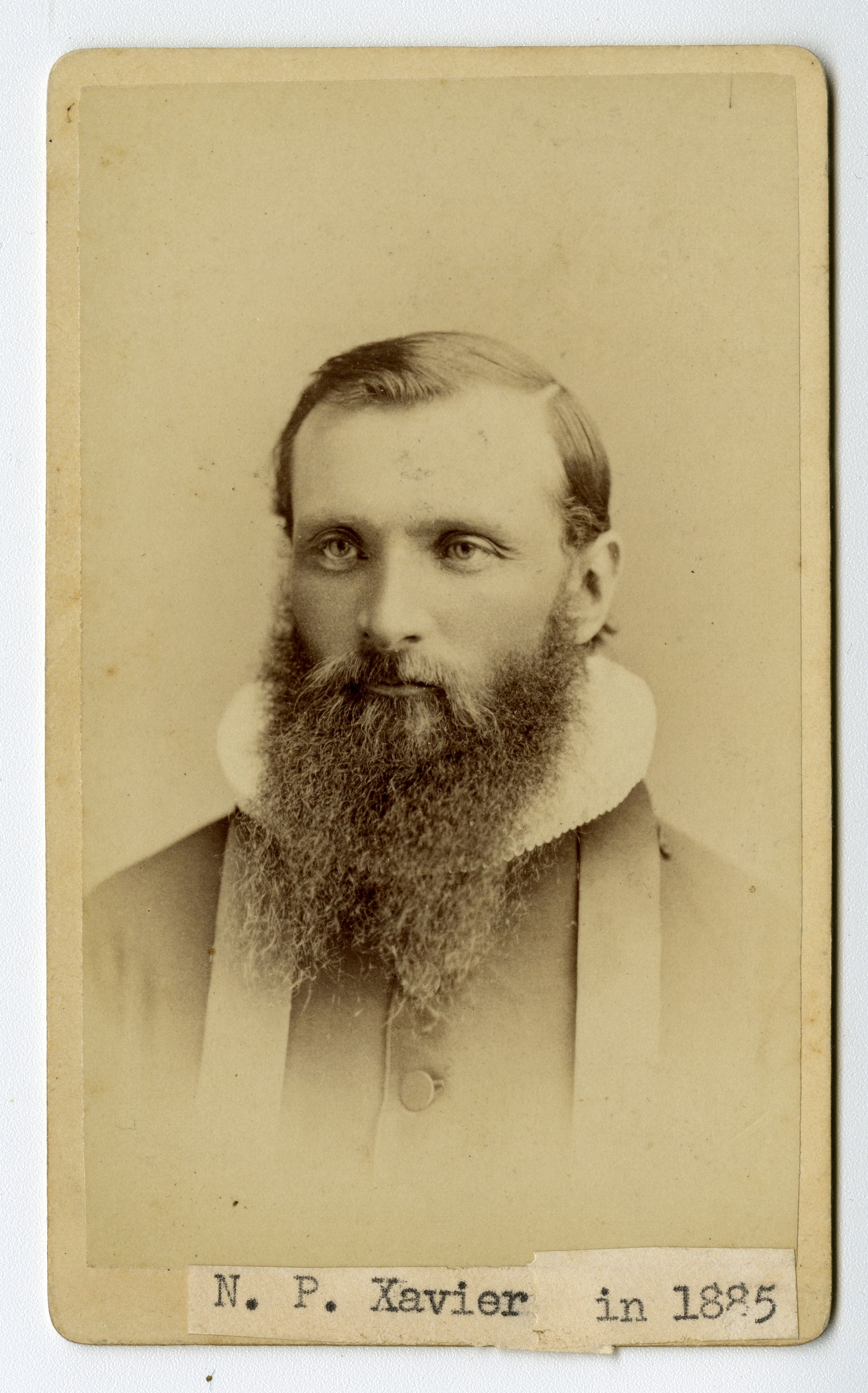
Nils Xavier was a well-known Sami pastor in the United States.

According to the Norwegian Sámi Parliament, the Sámi population of Norway is 40,000. If all people who speak Sámi or have a parent, grandparent, or great-grandparent who speaks or spoke Sámi are included, the number reaches 70,000. As of 2021, 20,545 people were registered to vote in the election for the Sámi Parliament in Norway. The bulk of the Sámi live in Finnmark and Northern Troms, but there are also Sámi populations in Southern Troms, Nordland and Trøndelag. Due to recent migration, it has also been claimed that Oslo is the municipality with the largest Sámi population. The Sámi are in a majority only in Guovdageaidnu Municipality, Kárášjohka Municipality, Porsáŋgu Municipality, Deatnu Municipality and Unjárga Municipality in Finnmark, and Gáivuotna Municipality in Northern Troms. This area is also known as the Sámi core area, and Sámi and Norwegian are co-equal administrative languages here.

According to the Swedish Sámi Parliament, estimates of the size of the Sámi population of Sweden range from 20,000 to 40,000. As of 2021, 9,226 people were registered to vote in elections to the Swedish Sámi Parliament.

According to the Finnish Population Registry Center and the Finnish Sámi Parliament, the Sámi population living in Finland was 10,753 in 2019. As of 31 December 2021, only 2,023 people were registered as speaking a Sámi language as their mother tongue.

According to the 2010 All-Russia Census, the Sámi population of Russia was 1,771.

=== Sámi diaspora outside of Sápmi ===
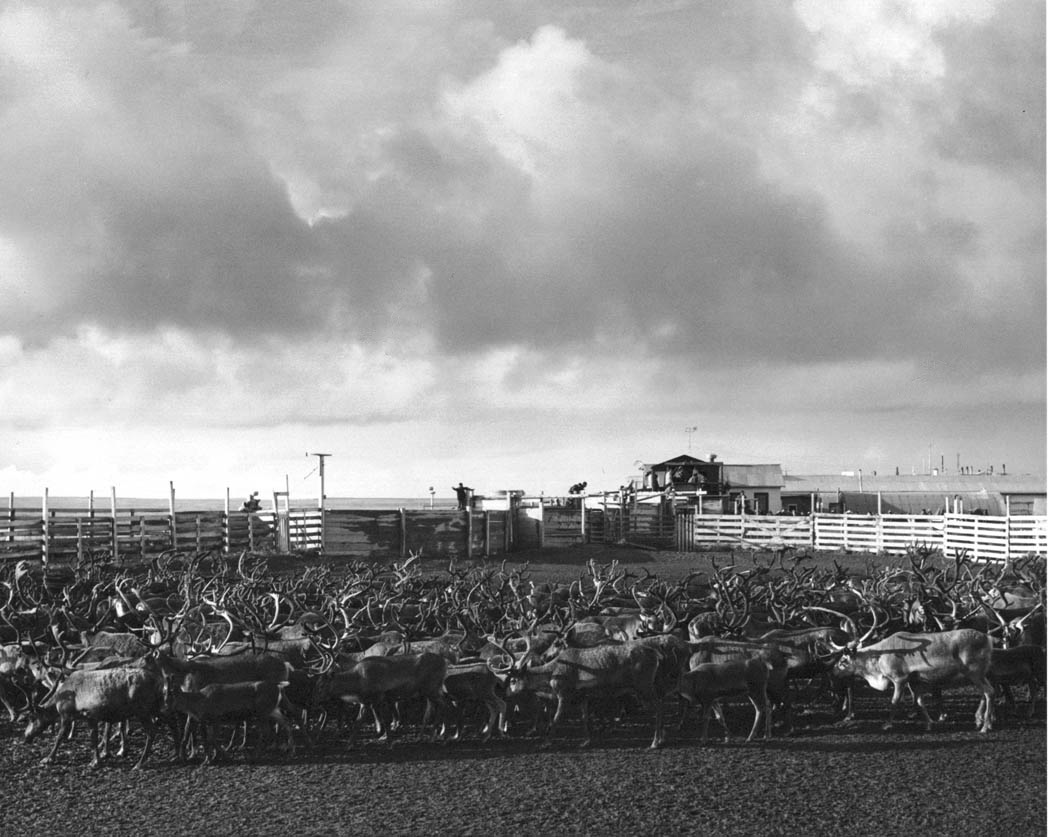
Reindeer in Alaska

An estimated 30,000 people living in North America are either Sámi or descendants of Sámi. Most have settled in areas that are known to have Norwegian, Swedish, and Finnish immigrants. Some of the concentrated areas of Sámi Americans are Minnesota, North Dakota, Iowa, Wisconsin, the Upper Peninsula of Michigan, Illinois, California, Washington, Utah, and Alaska; and throughout Canada, including Saskatchewan, Manitoba, Northern Ontario, the Northwest Territories, Yukon, and Nunavut.

Descendants of these Sámi immigrants typically know little of their heritage because their ancestors purposely hid their Indigenous culture to avoid discrimination by the dominating Scandinavian or Nordic culture. Some of these Sámi are part of a diaspora that moved to North America to escape assimilation policies in their home countries. There were also several Sámi families that were brought to North America with herds of reindeer by the U.S. and Canadian governments as part of the Alaska Reindeer Service, designed to teach the Inuit about reindeer herding.

Some of these Sámi immigrants and descendants of immigrants are members of the Sami Siida of North America.

== Genetic studies ==
According to genetic studies, most of the autosomal admixture of Sámi people is Western Eurasian and similar to other Europeans, but it also includes a significant Siberian component. Siberian ancestry is typically higher among Uralic-speaking populations than among Europeans in general and is thought to be linked to the spread of the language family.

The two most frequent maternal lineages of the Sámi people are the haplogroups V (Neolithic in Europe, not found in Finland 1500 years ago) and U5b (ancient in Europe). The Y-chromosome haplogroup N-VL29 makes up 20% and came from Siberia 3,500 years ago. The Y-chromosome haplogroup N-Z1936 makes up about 20% and likely came from Siberia with the Sámi language, but slightly later than N-VL29. This tallies with archeological evidence suggesting that several different cultural groups made their way to the core area of Sápmi from 8000 to 6000 BC, presumably including some of the ancestors of present-day Sámi.

The Sámi have been found to be genetically unrelated to people of the Pitted Ware culture. (Note: "Population continuity between the PWC and modern Saami can be rejected under all assumed ancestral population size combinations.") The Pitted Ware culture are genetically continuous with the original Scandinavian Hunter–Gatherers. (Note: "Our data support that the Neolithic PWC foragers are largely genetically continuous to SHG.")

== History of scientific research carried out on the Sámi ==
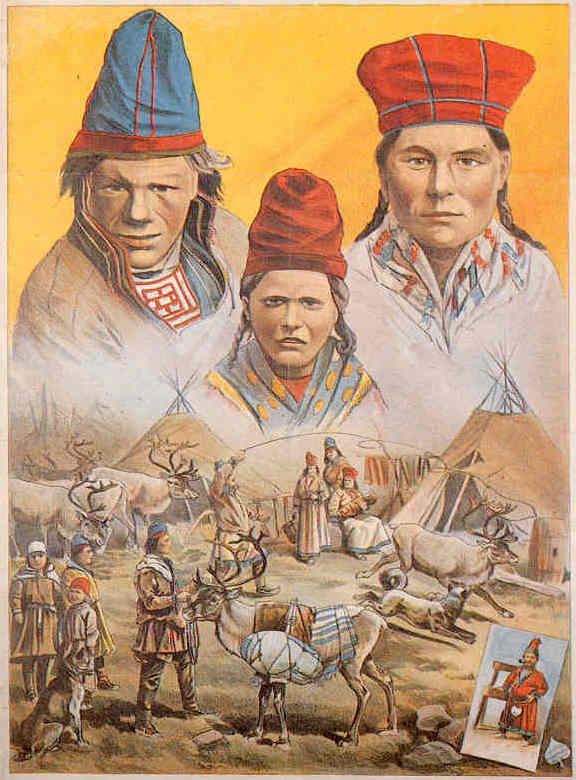
Advertisement for an 1893/1894 ethnological exposition of Sámi in Hamburg-Saint Paul

The genetic makeup of Sámi people has been extensively studied for as long as such research has been in existence. Ethnographic photography of the Sámi began shortly after the invention of the camera in the 19th century. This continued on into the 1920s and 1930s, when Sámi were photographed naked and anatomically measured by scientists, with the help of the local police—sometimes at gunpoint—to collect data that would justify their own racial theories. This has inculcated a degree of distrust by some in the Sámi community toward genetic research.

Sámi graves were plundered to provide research materials, of which their remains and artifacts from this period from across Sápmi can still be found in various state collections. In the late 19th century, colonial fascination with Arctic peoples led to human beings exhibited in human zoos. Sámi people were exhibited with their traditional lavvu tents, weapons, and sleds beside a group of reindeer at Tierpark Hagenbeck and other zoos across the globe.

== Notable people of Sámi descent ==
=== Arts ===
- Ante Aikio (born 1977), in Northern Sámi Luobbal Sámmol Sámmol Ánte, Finnish-Sámi linguist specializing in Uralic languages, historical linguistics, Sámi languages and Sámi prehistory at the Sámi University of Applied Sciences in Kautokeino, Norway.
- Louise Bäckman (1926–2021) Born in Tärnaby, Ume Sámi speaker. Professor emerita in Religious Studies. She carried out several studies of pre-Christian religion among the Sámi and made contributions in the study of Sámi sociology and language.
- Israel Ruong (1903–1986) Born in Arjeplog. A Swedish-Sámi linguist, politician and professor of Sámi languages and culture at the University of Uppsala in Sweden. Israel Ruong spoke Pite Sámi as his mother tongue.
- Ande Somby (born 1958) Born in Buolbmat. A University Researcher, artist, cofounder of DAT.
- Gunvor Guttorm (born 1958) artist, art historian and academic
- Anna Näkkäläjärvi-Länsman (born 1979) singer songwriter, yoiker

=== Explorers and adventurers ===
- Samuel Balto (1861–1921), Arctic explorer and gold miner. As a team of two, Balto and Fridtjof Nansen were the first people to cross Greenland on skis. The very famous dog Balto was named after Samuel Balto.
- Lars Monsen (born 1963) adventurer, explorer, journalist and author.

=== Literature ===
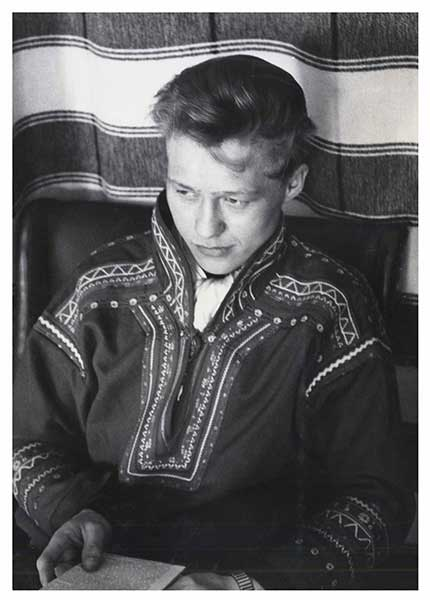
Nils-Aslak Valkeapää, a Sámi writer, musician and artist from Finland

- Linnea Axelsson (born 1980), author and poet. Her poem, Ædnan, won the 2018 Svenska Dagbladet Literature Prize, and its English translation was longlisted for the 2024 National Book Award for Translated Literature.
- Ella Holm Bull (1929–2006), author, musician, schoolteacher.
- Anders Fjellner (1795–1876), Protestant priest and poet. Wrote down the mythological joik that inspired the Sámi flag.
- Ailo Gaup (1944–2014), an author and neo-shaman who participated in founding the Beaivváš Sámi Theatre.
- Ann-Helén Laestadius (born 1971), author.
- Isak Mikal Saba (1875–1925), politician and writer. Was the first Sámi parliamentarian (Norwegian Labour Party) and wrote the Sámi national anthem.
- Olaus Sirma (1655–1719), the first Sámi poet known by name.
- Johan Turi (1854–1936), wrote first secular book in Sámi.
- Nils-Aslak Valkeapää (1943–2001), musician, poet and artist.
- Ánná Káisá Partapuoli (born 1995), Sámi poet

=== Music ===
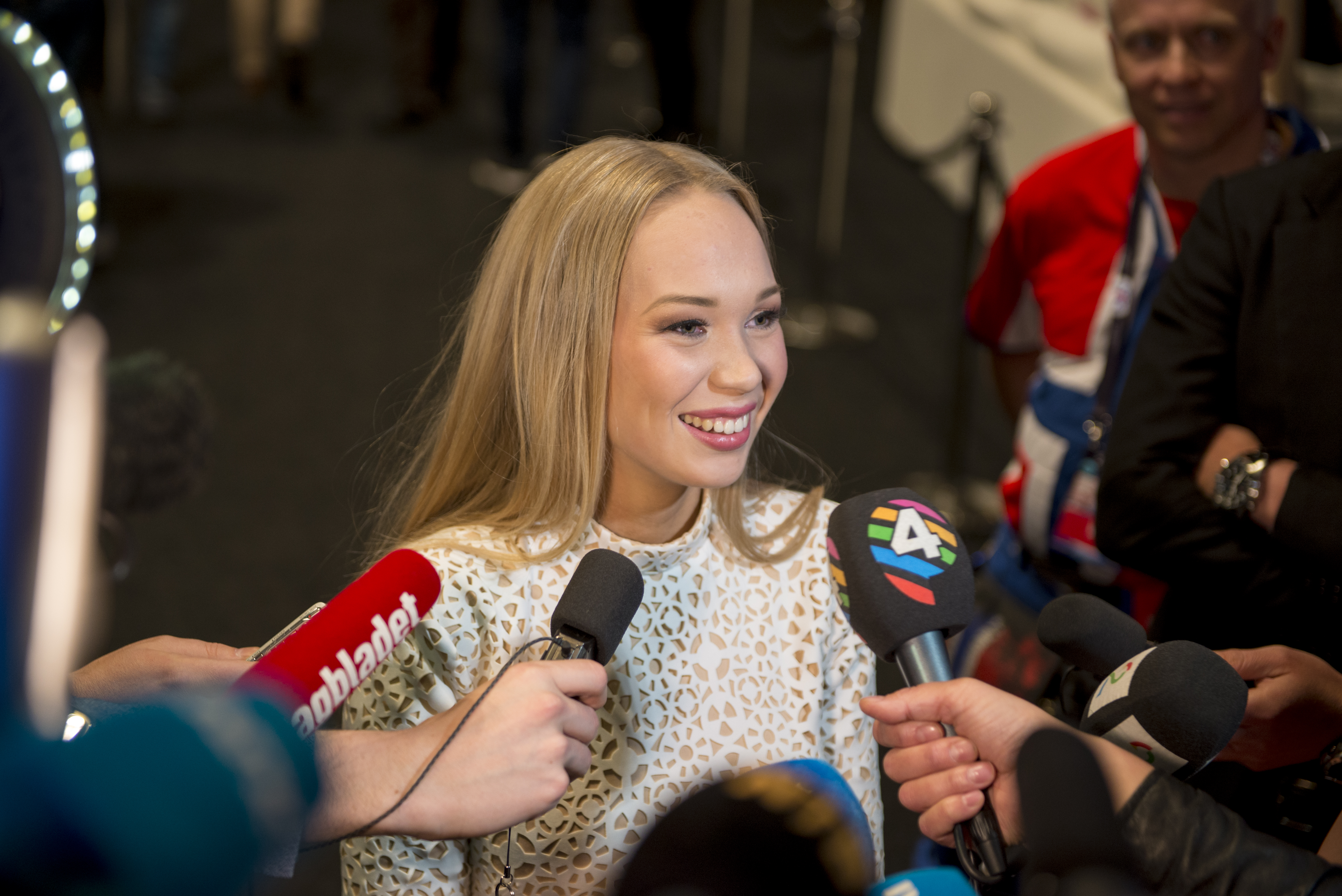
Agnete Johnsen

- Adjagas, musical group.
- The Blacksheeps, punk rock band.
- Mari Boine (born 1956), musician.
- Ane Brun, singer and songwriter.
- Fred Buljo (born 1988), rapper, singer, joik. Member of KEiiNO and Duolva Duottar.
- Frode Fjellheim, joik musician.
- Ingor Ánte Áilo Gaup (born 1960), actor, composer, and folk musician.
- Sofia Jannok (born 1982), performer, musician and radio host.
- Agnete Johnsen (born 1994), singer and songwriter.
- Inga Juuso (1945–2014), singer and actress.
- Gustav Kappfjell (1913–1999), Sámi joiker and artist. Also noted for being part of the resistance movement during WW2.
- Joni Mitchell (born 1943), musician and painter.
- Mikkâl Morottaja (born 1984), rap musician.
- Jaco Pastorius (1951–1987), influential American jazz musician, composer and electric bass player.
- John Persen (1941–2014), composer.
- Ulla Pirttijärvi (born 1971), joik singer.
- Roger Pontare (born 1951), musician.
- Wimme Saari (born 1959), musician.
- Ánde Somby, Sámi musician and law professor.
- Lisa Cecilia Thomasson-Bosiö, or Lapp-Lisa (1878–1932), singer.
- Vajas, musical group.
- Niko Valkeapää (born 1968), musician and songwriter.
- Nils-Aslak Valkeapää (1943–2001), musician, poet and artist.

=== Film and theatre ===
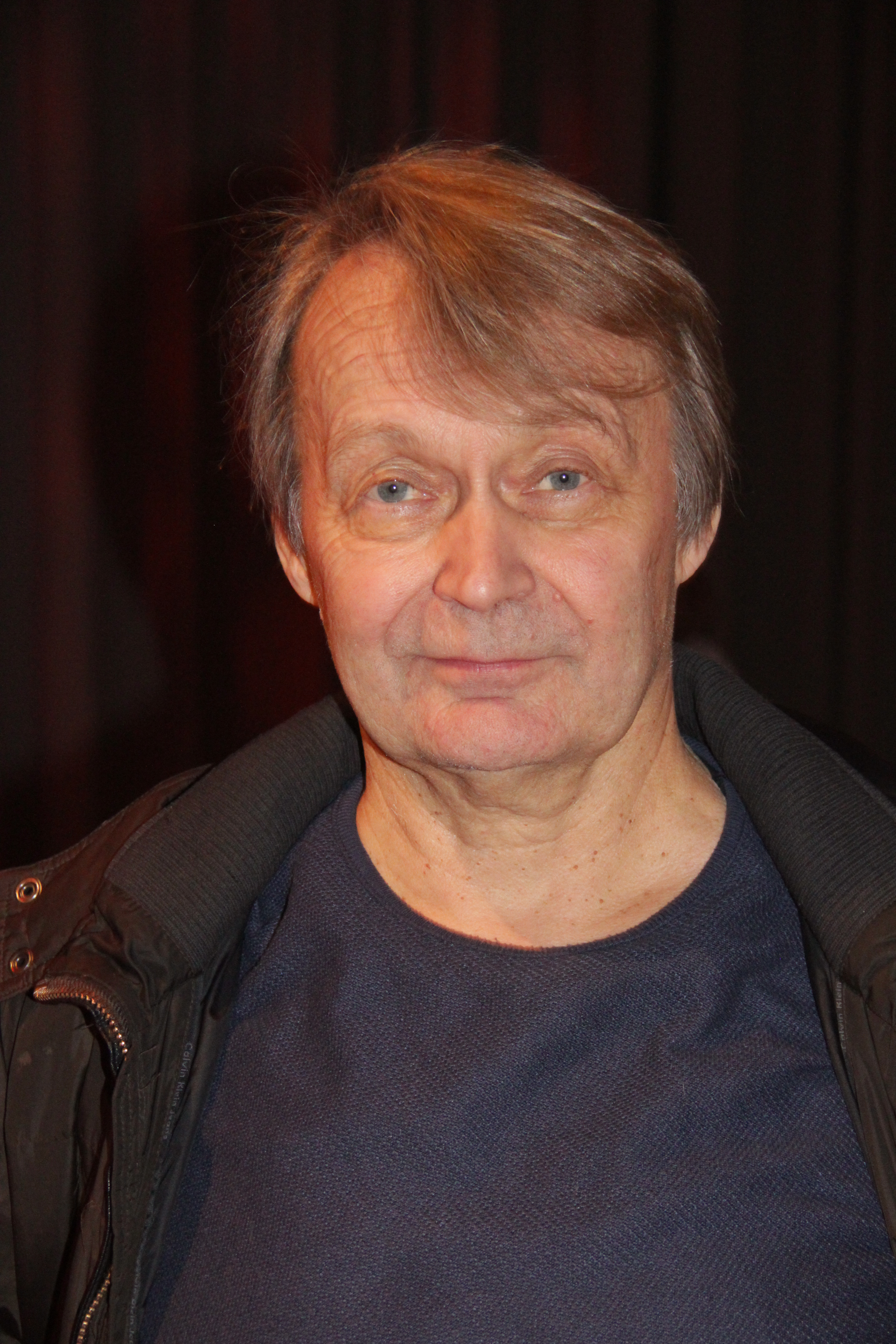
Nils Gaup, a Sámi film director from Norway

- Mikkel Gaup, actor.
- Nils Gaup (born 1955), film director. Well-known films include Ofelaš (Pathfinder), which was nominated for an Academy Award, and the 2008 film Kautokeino-Opprøret, based on the Kautokeino Rebellion.
- Jalmari Helander (1976), Finnish screenwriter and film director.
- Lance Henriksen (1940), actor of Norwegian parentage; his grandmother was Sámi.
- Anni-Kristiina Juuso (born 1979), actress.
- Sara Margrethe Oskal (born 1970), actress, film director
- Lene Cecilia Sparrok (1997), Norwegian actress of Sámi descent.
- Elle-Máijá Tailfeathers, Canadian filmmaker, Indigenous rights activist, and actress of Sámi and Blackfoot heritage, on her father's and mother's sides, respectively. Works in multiple genres, including experimental, documentary, drama, and action.
- Onni Tommila (1999), Finnish actor.
- Tommy Wirkola (1979), Norwegian filmmaker of Finnish Sámi descent.
- Renée Zellweger (1969), Oscar-winning actress whose Norwegian mother is of partial Sámi descent.
- Liselotte Wajstedt (Sami film director)
- Majlis (Maj-Lis) Ingegerd Skaltje (Sami film director)

=== Politics and society ===
- Lars Levi Laestadius (1800–1861), religious reformer, botanist and ethnologist.
- Ole Henrik Magga (born 1947), politician. The first President of the Norwegian Sámi Parliament (NSR) and first Chairman of the UN Permanent Forum on Indigenous Issues.
- Helga Pedersen (born 1973) politician. The first Sámi member of Government (Minister of Fisheries and Coastal Affairs, Norwegian Labour Party).
- Elsa Laula Renberg (1877–1931), politician and activist. Organized the first international Sámi conference and wrote a rhetorically powerful pamphlet of resistance to colonization.
- Isak Mikal Saba (1875–1925), politician and writer. Was the first Sámi parliamentarian (Norwegian Labour Party) and wrote the Sámi national anthem.
- Janne Seurujärvi (born 1975), politician. The first Sámi member of Parliament of Finland.
- Irja Seurujärvi-Kari (born 1947), politician and academic; member of the Finnish Sámi Parliament.
- Laila Susanne Vars (born 1976), former vice-president of the Sámi Parliament in Norway, first Sámi woman with a PhD in law, member of the UN Expert Mechanism on the Rights of Indigenous Peoples (EMRIP), rector of the Sámi University of Applied Sciences.

=== Visual arts ===
- Simen Johan (born 1973), Visual Artist. Born in Kirkenes, Norway, lives and works in New York City
- Hans Ragnar Mathisen, artist.
- Joni Mitchell (born 1943) musician and painter. Unconfirmed.
- Nils-Aslak Valkeapää (1943–2001), musician, poet and artist.

=== Sports ===
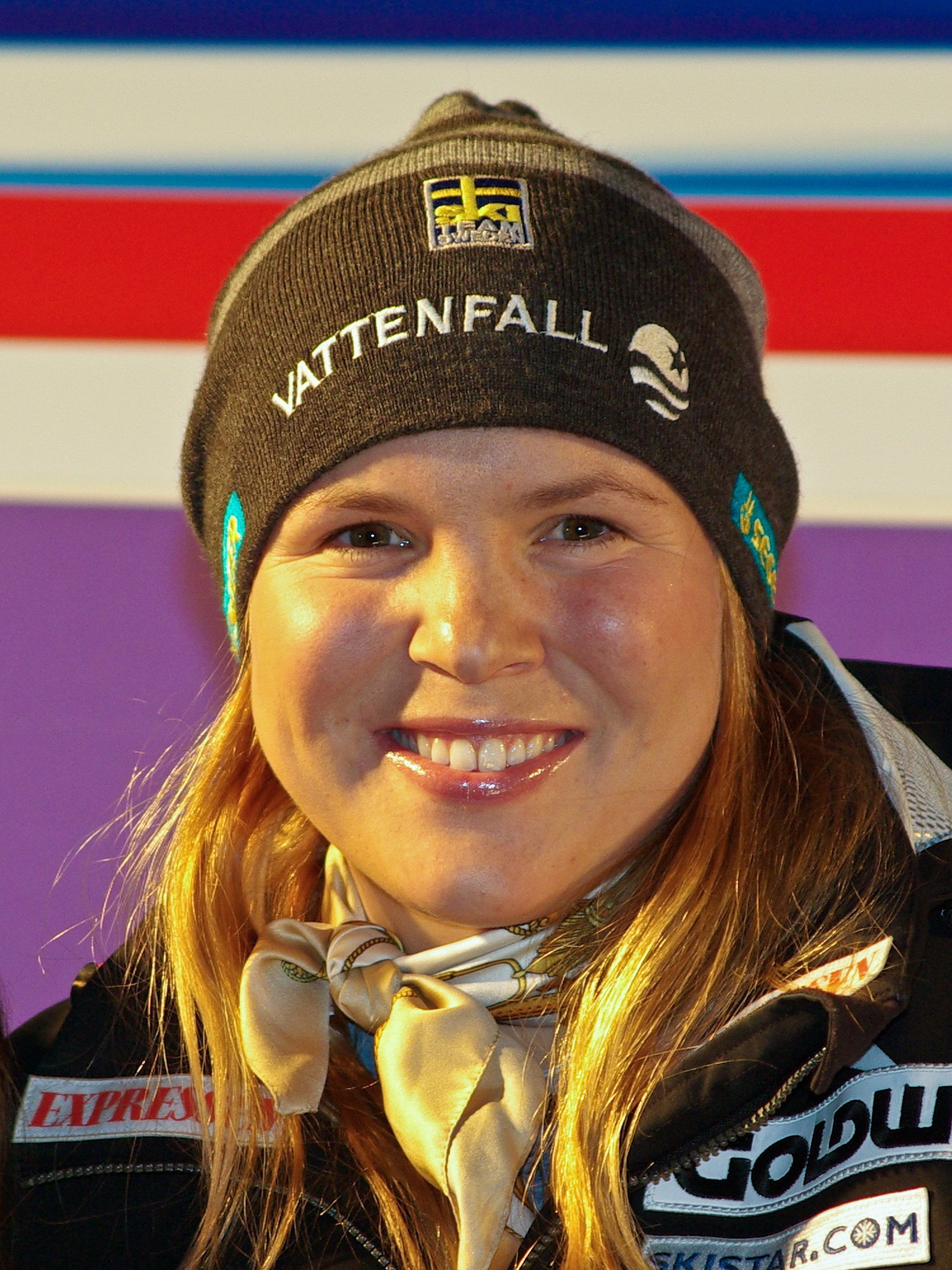
Anja Pärson, a Sámi skier from Sweden

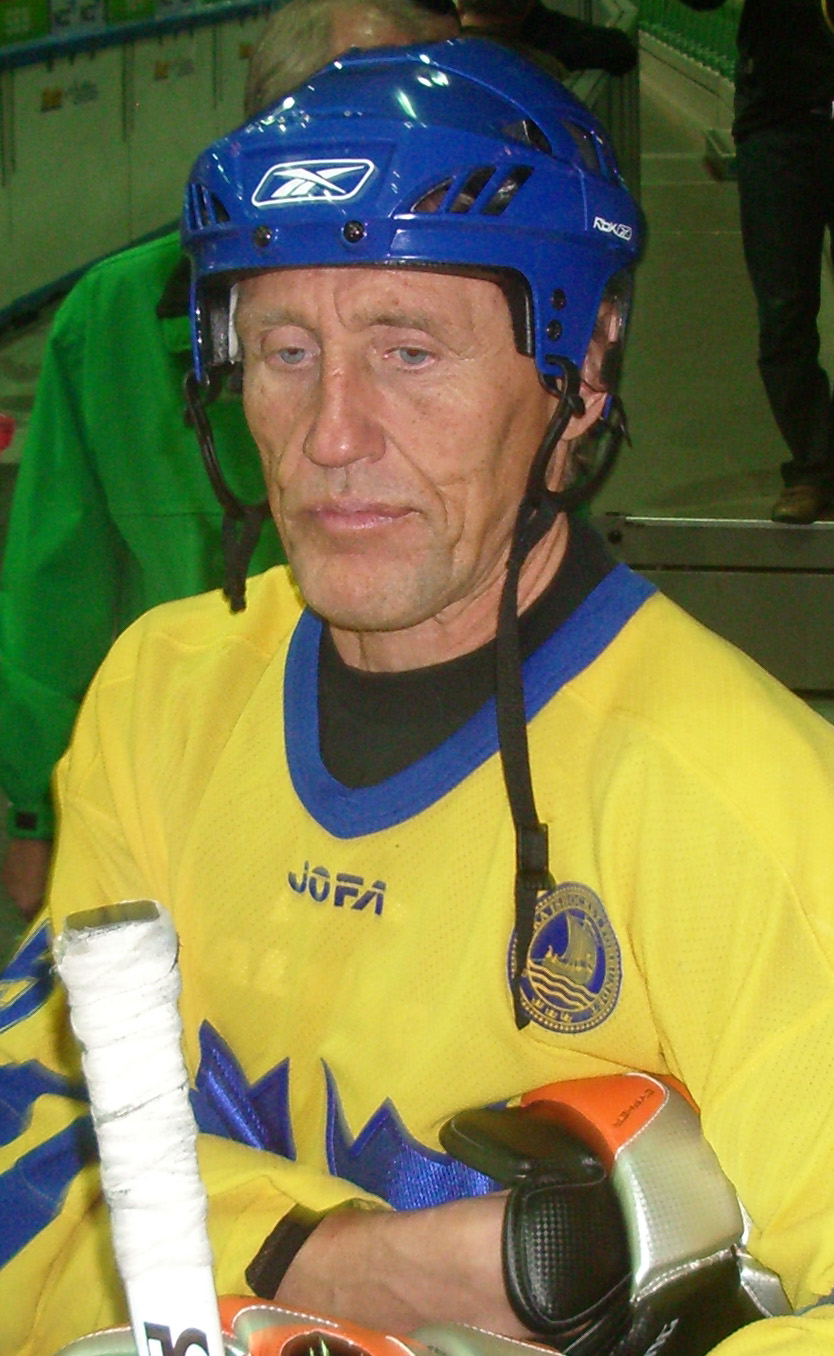
Börje Salming, a retired ice hockey defenceman

- Jens Byggmark, Swedish former World Cup alpine ski racer
- Ailo Gaup (born 1980), a motocross sportsman who invented the "underflip".
- John Halvorsen, athletics.
- Anja Pärson (born 1981) and Jens Byggmark (born 1985), alpine skiers.
- Morten Gamst Pedersen (born 1981), Football player (former player for Blackburn Rovers).
- Jon Rønningen, wrestler. Olympic gold medalist.
- Lars Rønningen, wrestler.
- Börje Salming (1951–2022), NHL defenseman, member of Hockey Hall of Fame, voted to the IIHF all-century team.
- Finn Hågen Krogh (born 1990), cross-country skier

=== Other ===
- Graan, the single noble family of Sámi descent (Swedish nobility).
- Sven-Eirik Utsi, famous criminal.

== See also ==
- Origins of the Sámi
- Environmental racism in Europe
- Hamburg culture
- List of Indigenous peoples
- Reindeer in Russia
- Sampo Lappelill

=== Sámi culture ===
- Fourth World
- Inari
- Indigenous small-numbered peoples of the North, Siberia and the Far East
- Knud Leem
- Sámi cuisine
- Sápmi Park – Located Karasjok, Norway, Sápmi Park and visitor center presents the Sámi culture and its history through exhibits and a special effect theater presentation, entitled "The Magic Theater" designed originally by award-winning experience designer Bob Rogers (designer) and the design team BRC Imagination Arts.
- Ume Sámi language

=== Sámi films ===
- The White Reindeer (Valkoinen peura) (1952), a Finnish horror drama film set in Finnish Lapland among the Sámi people.
- Pathfinder (Ofelaš) (1988), film nominated for the Academy Award for Best Foreign Film; filmed in Norway featuring Sámi actors speaking in Sámi
- Give Us Our Skeletons, a 1999 documentary about the scientific racism and racial classification movement carried out on the Sámi
- The Cuckoo (Kukushka) (2002), film set during World War II with a Sámi woman as one of the main characters
- Last Yoik in Saami Forests? (2007), made for the United Nations, a documentary about land rights disputes in Finnish Lapland
- The Sami (Saamelainen) (2007), a Mushkeg Media documentary about the state of aboriginal languages
- Wolf (2008), an examination of how the traditions of the Sámi villagers in northern Sweden are confronted with modern-day society
- Herdswoman (2008), a documentary about land rights disputes in reindeer grazing areas
- The Kautokeino Rebellion (2008), feature film that concerns the ethnic-religious Sámi revolt in Guovdageaidnu of 1852
- Magic Mushrooms and Reindeer: Weird Nature (2009), short video on the use of Amanita muscaria mushrooms by the Sámi people and their reindeer, produced by the BBC
- Suddenly Sami (2009), in which the filmmaker finds out that her mother has been hiding her Arctic Indigenous Sámi heritage from her
- Midnight Sun (2016), crime series which revolves around Sámi culture and conflicts of Sámi culture with modern Swedish society
- Sami Blood (2016), a movie chronicling the life of a Sámi girl taken into a Swedish boarding school to be forcibly assimilated as a Swede
- Frozen (2013), features a major character named Kristoff who wears clothing resembling Sámi attire and has a pet reindeer.
- Frozen II (2019), features the forest tribe known as the Northuldra, which is based on the Sámi people, and the theme song Vuelie, written by Norwegian joiker Frode Fjellheim and performed by Norwegian female choral group Cantus, is based on Sámi music. There is a North Sámi dubbing of the film.
- Klaus (2019), animated film about "a postman stationed in a town to the North who befriends a reclusive toy-maker" featuring Sámi characters.
- Jeʹvida (2023), the first feature-length film in the Skolt Sámi language.
- Stolen (2024), a Netflix adaptation of the novel of the same name by Ann-Helén Laestadius
- My Fathers' Daughter (2024)
- Brace Your Heart (2026)

== Sources ==
- Hansen, Lars Ivar; Olsen, Bjørnar (2014). Hunters in Transition: An Outline of Early Sámi History. The Northern World: North Europe and the Baltic c. 400–1700 AD. Peoples, Economics and Cultures. Vol. 63. Leiden: Brill. ISBN 978-90-04-25254-7.
- Malmström, Helena (24 September 2009). "Ancient DNA Reveals Lack of Continuity between Neolithic Hunter-Gatherers and Contemporary Scandinavians". Current Biology. 19 (20). Cell Press: 1758–1762. Bibcode:2009CBio...19.1758M. doi:10.1016/j.cub.2009.09.017. PMC 4275881. PMID 19781941.
- Mittnik, Alisa (30 January 2018). "The genetic prehistory of the Baltic Sea region". Nature Communications. 16 (1) 442. Nature Research. Bibcode:2018NatCo...9..442M. doi:10.1038/s41467-018-02825-9. PMC 5789860. PMID 29382937.
- Urbańczyk, Przemysław (1992). Medieval Arctic Norway. Institute of the History of Material Culture, Polish Academy of Sciences. Warsaw: Semper. ISBN 978-83-900213-0-0.
