= Fragments of Lappish Mythology =

19th-century work by Lars Levi Laestadius

- Author: Lars Levi Laestadius
- Publication date: 1997
- ISBN: 978-0-968-58819-2

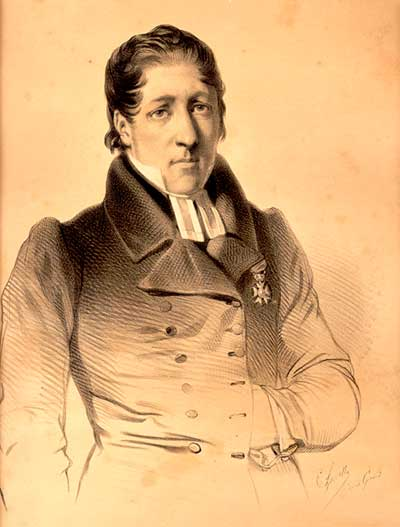
Lars Levi Laestadius in 1839 during the La Recherche Expedition

Fragments of Lappish Mythology is the detailed documented account of the Sami religious beliefs and mythology during the mid-19th century. It was written between 1838 and 1845 by Swedish minister Lars Levi Laestadius, but was not published until 1997 in Swedish, 2000 in Finnish, and 2002 in English. The book was originally written for the French-funded La Recherche Expedition of 1838–1840, but was lost and forgotten for many decades thereafter.

Laestadius describes the state of Sami religious beliefs held during his time, which had already long been passing into history by the Christianization of the Sami during this period. The condition of these stories is described as "fragments", as Laestadius himself admitted that there was a great deal of Sami religious beliefs that he knew little about because of the Sami peoples' secrecy concerning their beliefs.

== Loss and discovery of the book ==
Laestadius was invited to participate in the La Recherche Expedition (1838–1840) by the French Navy because he was recognized for his knowledge of botany and the Sami languages, both of which the expedition undertook to study. Laestadius was the field guide for the Norwegian Atlantic islands and in the interior of Northern Norway and Sweden, studying and describing both plant life of the high arctic, and the culture of the Sami people at the time of the expedition. After the expedition, Laestadius was mentioned extensively within the project; however, his Sami chronicle was quickly forgotten as other issues came to the forefront such as Laestadius's personal and moral struggles and his focus on the new Laestadian movement rather than Sami shamanism. Laestadius delayed in sending the complete work of the project rather than piecemealing in single parts, and he personally lacked the money to publish the text himself. The French government also lost interest as there was considerable political instability during the 1840s, ending in the French Revolution of 1848, which finally ended French interest in the whole project and in publication of the Fragments. The results of the entire expedition, excluding the Fragments, were buried in the National archives of France.

But since these noaides through their alleged or real magic skills represented the greatest hindrance for the rapid spread of the faith among the populace, it was natural that they would be hated and persecuted by the priests who saw the noaides as the Devil's instruments.
Læstadius Fragments...

=== Discovery ===
Because of the delay in the French government's receipt of Laestadius's manuscript, it was not published in the expedition's final publication work. The leader of the expedition, Joseph Paul Gaimard, held Laestadius's work in his private collection until his death in 1858. Thereafter, part 1 of the work was sold to a Xavier Marmier of Pontarlier, France, who upon his death in 1892, willed it to the Pontarlier library. There it stayed in the Marmier's un-catalogued collection until it was discovered in 1933. Parts 2–5 of Fragments were sold, as part of Gaimard's estate, to the local antiquarian bookstores, where they ended up in the personal library of French Count Paul Edouard Didier Riantin. Thereafter, their whereabouts remained unknown until they were discovered in 1946 across the Atlantic Ocean in the manuscript archives of Yale University. In 1959, parts 2–5 were microfilmed and added to the university's Swedish library.

Fragments of Lappish Mythology

Contents

1. Reminder to the Reader
2. Part 1: Doctrine of Deities
3. Part 2: Doctrine of Sacrifice
4. Part 3: Doctrine of Divination
5. Part 4: Selection of Lappish Tales
6. Part 5: Addition

== See also ==
- Norwegianization

== Citation ==
- Læstadius, Lars Levi (December 1, 2002). Juha Pentikäinen (ed.). Fragments of Lappish Mythology. Aspasia Books. ISBN 0-9685881-9-0.
