= Korpela =

Korpela is a Finnish surname. Notable people with the surname include:

- Ernest J. Korpela (born 1936), American politician
- Eva Korpela (born 1958), Swedish biathlete
- Jorma Korpela (born 1960), Finnish modern pentathlete
- Toivo Korpela (1900–1963), Finnish Læstadian preacher
- Tommi Korpela (born 1968), Finnish actor
- Merja Korpela (born 1981), Finnish hammer thrower
- Tinja-Riikka Korpela (born 1986), Finnish football player
