= Apostolic Lutheran Church of America =

Lutheran church denomination

- Abbreviation: The Federation, ALCA
- Classification: Protestant
- Orientation: Lutheran
- Region: United States
- Founder: Salomon Korteniemi
- Origin: 1872
- Members: 6,000 (2009)
- Other names: Salomon Korteniemi Lutheran Society (1872–1879); Finnish Apostolic Lutheran Congregation (1879–1900s); Finnish Apostolic Lutheran Church

The Apostolic Lutheran Church of America (ALCA) is a Laestadian Lutheran church denomination established by Finnish American and Norwegian immigrants in the 1800s. They came mainly from northern Finland and northern Norway where they had been members of the state churches. Most or all members had ties from their home countries to the Laestadian revival movement named after Swedish state church administrator and pastor Lars Levi Laestadius of Pajala, Sweden. Eventually, there were too many arguments between this denomination and the other American Laestadians, and some of the followers of Laestadius were excluded from the sacrament of holy communion. Under the lead of Salomon Korteniemi, the excluded members formed a congregation of their own in December 1872, under the name the Salomon Korteniemi Lutheran Society. In 1879 this name was changed to the Finnish Apostolic Lutheran Congregation. As other congregations of Finns in Massachusetts, Michigan, Minnesota, and Oregon were organized on the same basis, they came into fellowship with this body under the name the Finnish Apostolic Lutheran Church, or, as it is usually called, the Apostolic Lutheran Church.

The ALCA Laestadians are called "Mickelsens" by other Laestadians, after 20th Century leader Reverend Andrew Mickelsen (1897-1983). The organization is also referred to by members and non-members as the Federation.

== Membership ==
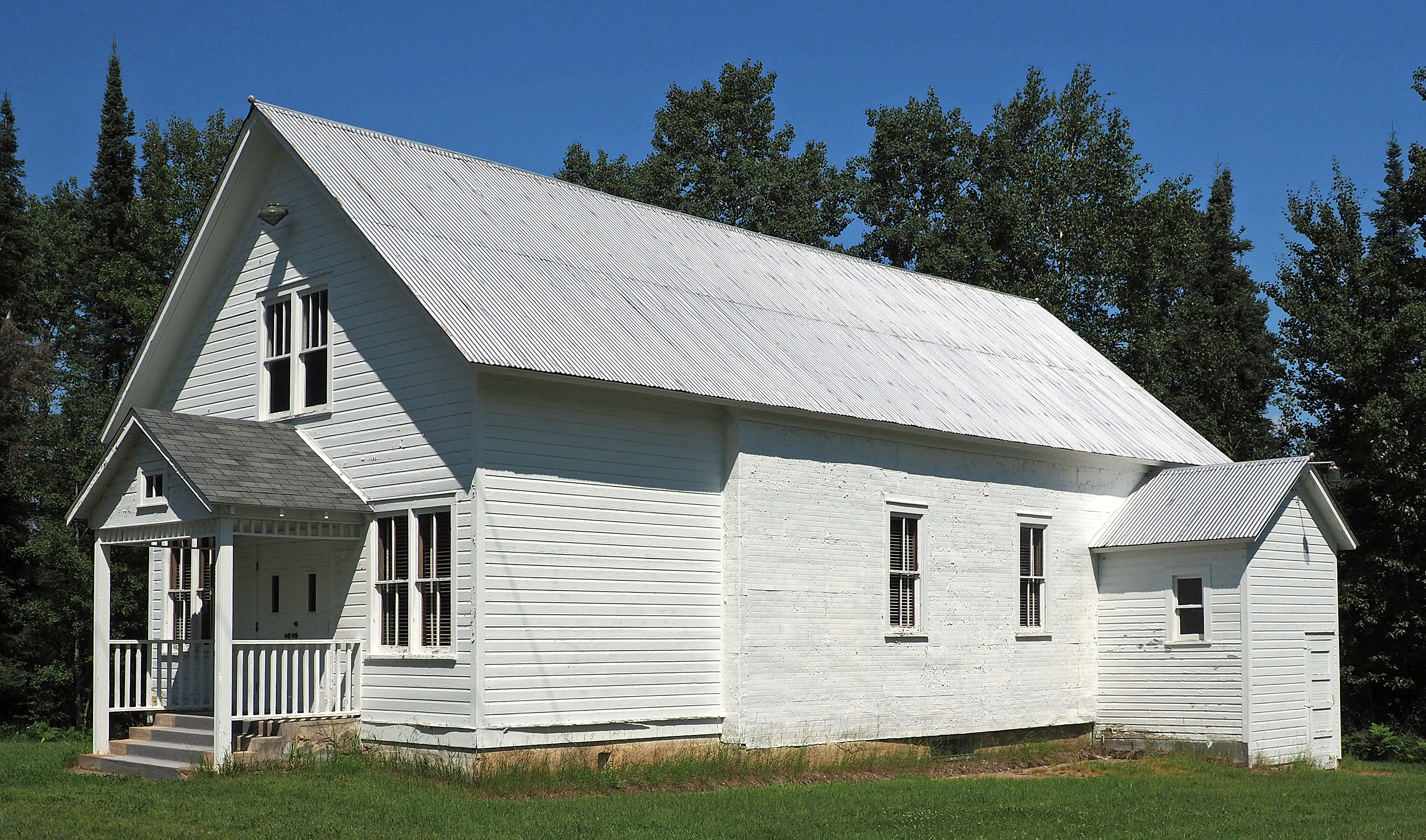
An Apostolic Lutheran Church in Minnesota

In 2009, membership in the denomination was estimated to include 6,000 baptized members. Its ministers are mostly lay preachers. It has sizable congregations in Michigan, Minnesota, Washington, New Hampshire and in various other countries, such as Canada and Finland. The national organization is governed by an elected board (the Central Board) which meets regularly at various locations across the United States and Canada, and individual member churches are governed by elected boards. The ALCA has no central headquarters facility.

Though historically a lay movement, a seminary education is becoming more common amongst Apostolic Lutheran pastors. The majority of seminary-instructed pastors receive their education from the Inter-Lutheran Theological Seminary in Hancock, Michigan.

== Doctrine ==
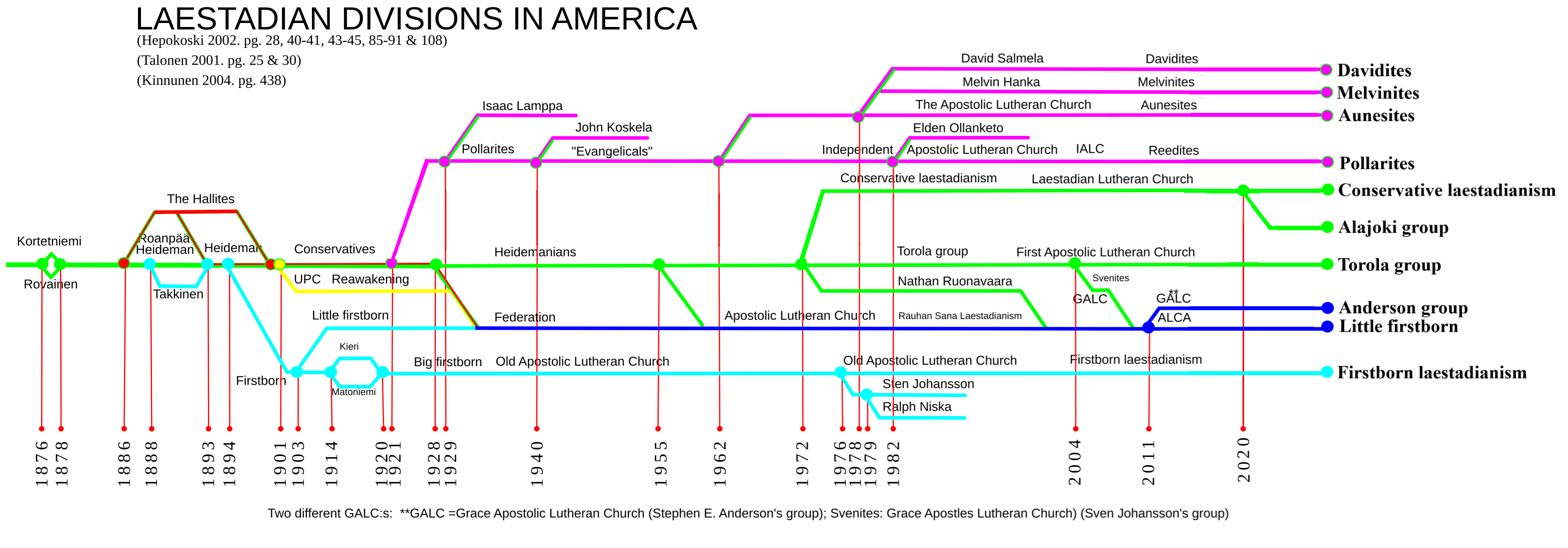
Family tree of laestadianism in America.

The ALCA narrowly follows the doctrines and practices of Laestadianism. For example, it emphasizes the necessity of regeneration and the practical importance of absolution from sin. It follows the Laestadian-specific doctrine of the audible declaration of forgiveness of sins and encourages avoidance of worldliness and sin. Unlike the two larger branches of Laestadianism, the ALCA does not teach that it is the only true Laestadian group.

Liturgically, the church accepts the creeds of the Evangelical Lutheran church.

The majority of the written doctrine of the Apostolic Lutheran Church is based on Luther's Small Catechism, a collection of Martin Luther's teachings.
