= Bombing of Pajala =

Accidental Soviet bombing in 1940

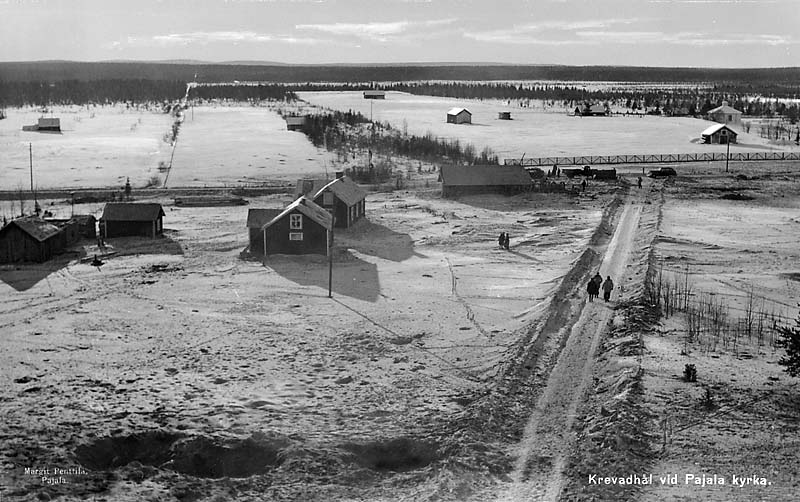
Craters at Pajala church.

The bombing of Pajala was a bombing that took place in Sweden during World War II on February 21, 1940. Seven Soviet bombers dropped around 150 aerial bombs over Pajala in Norrbotten County. Six buildings caught fire and two people were injured.

== Bombing ==
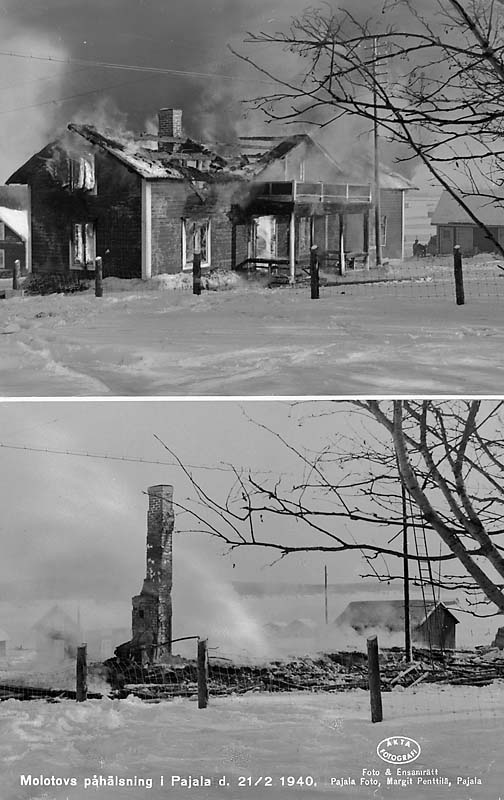
Burning residential building.

The bombing took place at around 12:40pm that day. A total of 48 explosive bombs weighing between 60 and 100 kilograms each were released. In addition, about a hundred incendiary bombs were spread by a rotating bomb spreader, which the Finns called Molotov's bread basket.

Most of the bombs fell on the outskirts of the village, which may indicate that altitude and wind strength were misjudged. Residents of Kengis, closer to the Finnish border, had seen the passing planes and some of Pajala's residents were therefore warned and were able to seek shelter outdoors or in their homes.

There was no fire department in the village, but residents put out the fires as best they could. Help also came from people in the surrounding villages who heard the bomb calls and saw the clouds of smoke.

One of the aircraft that took part in the attack had to make an emergency landing in Sodankylä in Finland on the way back to the base in Murmansk due to a lack of fuel. The three on board escaped on skis but were captured by Finnish troops.

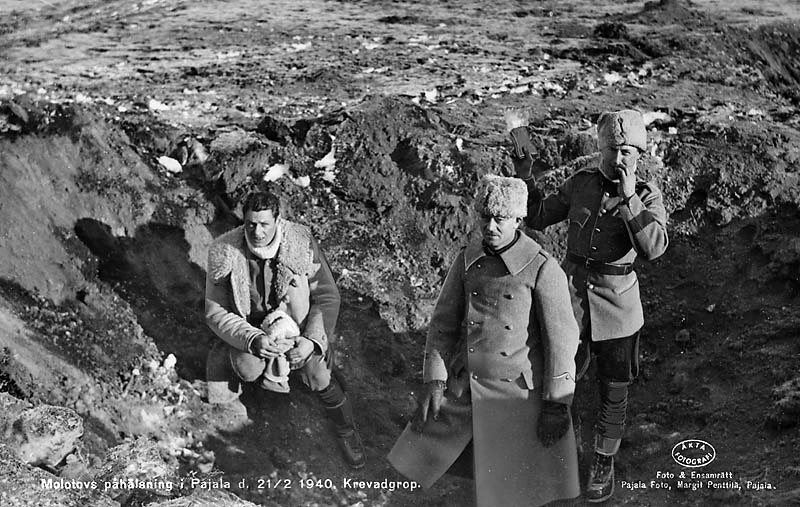
Men in bomb holes following the attack

=== Injuries ===
- Many bombs fell near the Pajala church, which was not damaged apart from windows that were shattered by the shock wave
- A bomb hit the old school's gymnasium, where a K4 from Umeå were housed during an exercise; however, the bomb did not explode
- The cemetery was hit by several bombs and was partially destroyed; among other things, a bomb fell just a few meters from Lars Levi Laestadius' grave
- A bomb exploded a few meters in front of a man who was out in a courtyard; however, he escaped completely unharmed
- A sawmill near the church was completely destroyed; the tractor driving the saw was thrown into the air and landed upside down
- 43 bomb holes were created
- The telephone connection to the south was broken
- A residential building, a barn, some outbuildings and a sauna were destroyed

== Aftermath ==
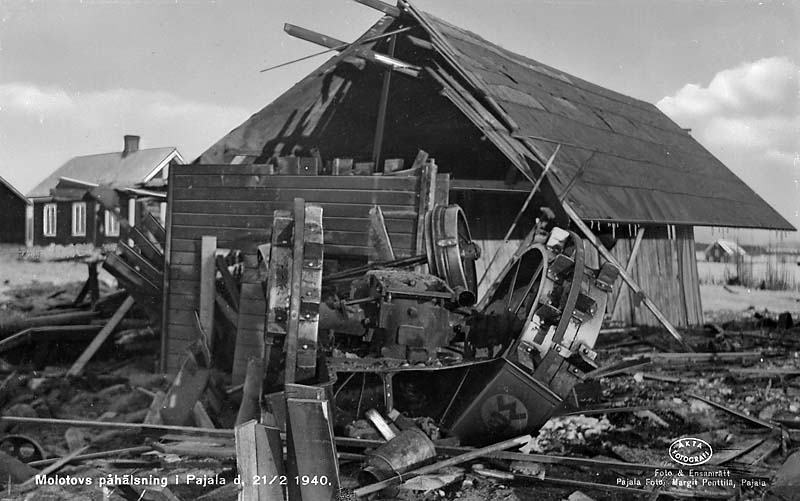
Blown up building and tractor

When the news of the bombing spread, country secretary Ragnar Sundberg traveled directly to Pajala to be able to report to the government. Later that day, Sweden submitted a formal protest to the Soviet Union. At first the Soviets denied that the bombing had taken place, saying the reports were a "malicious fabrication", but on March 6 they admitted that the bombs had been dropped by Soviet planes that had gone off course. It was the only one of the Russian bombings of Sweden during World War II that was recognized by the Soviet government.

In the time before the bombing was recognized as a mistake by the Soviet Union, both the national media and the local press reported extensively on the incident. Communist and social democratic press pushed the view that the bombing was a simple mistake, while bourgeois press took the view that the bombing was a provocation on the part of the Soviet Union. The event sparked further debate on whether Sweden should send aid to the Finns.

Soviet officers later inspected the damage and the Soviet Union paid 40,000 krona in damages. The material damage in society was estimated at almost SEK 45,000.
