= Niklas Grönberg =

Swedish actor and musician

Niklas Grönberg (born 29 June 1984, in Norrbotten), is a Swedish actor and musician. He developed an interest in the arts during his early teens, being one of the few means of entertainment in his hometown of Pajala. His interest led him to experiment with music, theatre and film. After starring in several short films and working as an extra every chance he got, he was cast as the sadistic and hedonistic vampire John in the horror film Frostbite, leading to international exposure.

Grönberg is also the frontman and composer for the Swedish band Pajala Truck Co. He composed their successful single From One Motherf**ker To the Next which managed to get a spot on Swedish billboards and get airplay. Pajala Truck Co. were not very popular in their home village of Pajala being booed at on stage during their first gigs. The record company they made a deal with prevented them from recording an album, but finally they were able to record "From One..." and get some attention from the press. This led to several more singles. Their following single Movements also went on to be a success on radio and in 2011 they released the single Tornilaasko which was a more personal song from Grönberg and the band, dealing with their home village and how the rest of the world seemed to be an eternity away and their need to show who they were.

== Filmography ==
| Year | Film | Role | Notes |
|---|---|---|---|
| 2009 | Att Återvända | Anders | |
| 2006 | Frostbite | John | |
| 2004 | Populärmusik från Vittula | Student | |
| 2002 | She's an Animal | Leif | |
