= Pajala =

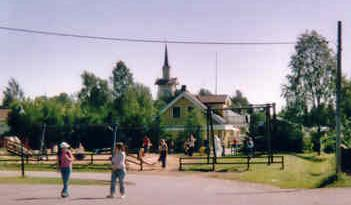
- Pajala Church, July 2004

- Location within Norrbotten
- Coordinates: 67°11′N 23°22′E
- Province: Norrbotten
- County: Norrbotten County
- Municipality: Pajala Municipality

Area
  - Total: 3.78 km^{2} (1.46 sq mi)

Population (31 December 2010)
  - Total: 1,958
  - Density: 518/km^{2} (1,340/sq mi)
- Time zone: UTC+1 (CET)
  - Summer (DST): UTC+2 (CEST)

Pajala (Swedish pronunciation: [ˈpɑjɑlɑ]) is a locality and the seat of Pajala Municipality in Norrbotten County, Sweden, with 1,958 inhabitants in 2010. It is located in Swedish Lapland.

Pajala is in part of the Torne Valley region and was in past times unilingually Meänkieli-speaking. While it is still spoken by many, after the Swedification policies of the 18- and 1900s Swedish has become the dominant language.

== History ==
Lars Levi Laestadius, a botanist, Lutheran minister, and founder of the revivalist movement Laestadianism, lived and worked in Pajala municipality in the mid-19th century. He lived in Kengis, but in 1869 his house and grave and the whole church of Kengis were moved to Pajala.

The town was mistakenly bombed by Soviet airplanes during the Finnish/Soviet Winter War, in spring 1940. Seven Soviet planes dropped 134 bombs, a mix of explosive and firebombs, which destroyed six buildings, badly damaging telephone wires, and making the streets impossible to drive on due to 43 big craters. No human deaths were recorded, although two persons were slightly injured. Soviet officers later inspected the destruction and the Soviet Union paid damages to Sweden in 1940.

== Literature about Pajala ==
The events in Mikael Niemi's book "Populärmusik från Vittula" (Popular Music from Vittula) occur mainly in Pajala. Vittula, or more properly Vittulajänkkä, is a colloquial name (roughly translating from Meänkieli as "the pussy swamp") for a certain garden suburb in Pajala. The book was also adapted into a film in 2004.

In another portrait of Pajala by Niemi, the crime novel "Mannen som dog som en lax" ("The Man who Died like a Salmon"), the author discusses the state of the minority language Meänkieli in Pajala today.

== Climate ==
Pajala has a harsh subarctic climate that is somewhat moderated by the influence of the North Atlantic. Its inland position and lower elevation cause warmer summers, and winters are a bit less cold than most areas on similar latitudes.

Climate data for Pajala (2002–2020 averages; extremes since 1940)
Month	Jan	Feb	Mar	Apr	May	Jun	Jul	Aug	Sep	Oct	Nov	Dec	Year
Record high °C (°F)	7.6 (45.7)	8.7 (47.7)	10.8 (51.4)	18.8 (65.8)	28.0 (82.4)	32.0 (89.6)	31.7 (89.1)	29.1 (84.4)	23.8 (74.8)	15.3 (59.5)	10.0 (50.0)	8.4 (47.1)	32.0 (89.6)
Mean maximum °C (°F)	1.6 (34.9)	3.5 (38.3)	7.0 (44.6)	13.2 (55.8)	22.8 (73.0)	25.3 (77.5)	26.5 (79.7)	25.1 (77.2)	19.0 (66.2)	11.1 (52.0)	4.5 (40.1)	3.0 (37.4)	27.9 (82.2)
Mean daily maximum °C (°F)	−8.5 (16.7)	−6.8 (19.8)	−0.9 (30.4)	5.2 (41.4)	12.1 (53.8)	17.2 (63.0)	20.6 (69.1)	18.0 (64.4)	12.0 (53.6)	3.5 (38.3)	−2.5 (27.5)	−5.1 (22.8)	5.4 (41.7)
Daily mean °C (°F)	−13.4 (7.9)	−11.9 (10.6)	−6.7 (19.9)	0.1 (32.2)	6.4 (43.5)	11.8 (53.2)	14.8 (58.6)	12.4 (54.3)	7.3 (45.1)	0.0 (32.0)	−6.4 (20.5)	−9.6 (14.7)	0.4 (32.7)
Mean daily minimum °C (°F)	−18.2 (−0.8)	−17.0 (1.4)	−12.5 (9.5)	−5.1 (22.8)	0.7 (33.3)	6.3 (43.3)	9.0 (48.2)	6.8 (44.2)	2.5 (36.5)	−3.5 (25.7)	−10.2 (13.6)	−14.0 (6.8)	−4.6 (23.7)
Mean minimum °C (°F)	−33.3 (−27.9)	−32.6 (−26.7)	−28.2 (−18.8)	−17.7 (0.1)	−6.5 (20.3)	−0.5 (31.1)	1.6 (34.9)	−1.9 (28.6)	−5.7 (21.7)	−17.0 (1.4)	−24.5 (−12.1)	−29.2 (−20.6)	−35.5 (−31.9)
Record low °C (°F)	−45.2 (−49.4)	−43.2 (−45.8)	−40.0 (−40.0)	−29.1 (−20.4)	−14.3 (6.3)	−4.0 (24.8)	−1.7 (28.9)	−5.8 (21.6)	−13.9 (7.0)	−26.0 (−14.8)	−36.5 (−33.7)	−38.7 (−37.7)	−45.2 (−49.4)
Average precipitation mm (inches)	37.4 (1.47)	27.7 (1.09)	21.5 (0.85)	24.7 (0.97)	44.7 (1.76)	59.1 (2.33)	75.7 (2.98)	57.3 (2.26)	55.4 (2.18)	40.8 (1.61)	43.9 (1.73)	40.7 (1.60)	528.9 (20.83)
Source: SMHI
