= Reza Bagher =

Swedish film director and screenwriter (born 1958)

- Born: 10 March 1958 (age 68); Tehran, Iran
- Occupation: Film director

Reza Bagher (born 10 March 1958) is an Iranian-born Swedish film director and screenwriter. He is best known for his film Popular Music, based on the novel Popular Music from Vittula by Mikael Niemi.

== Filmography ==
Year	Title	Director	Writer	Other notes
1983	Fredens röst	Yes	Yes	Short film
1988	Autopsi	Yes	Yes	Short film
1990	Strax före gryningen	Yes	Yes	Short film; co-writer with Maria Edlund
1992	Gorbatjov	Yes	Yes	Short film
1995	Jag heter Mitra	Yes	Yes	Short film; co-written with Fredrik Lindqvist
2000	Ett liv i backspegeln	Yes	Yes	Short film; co-written with Fredrik Lindqvist
2000	Vingar av glas	Yes	Yes	Co-written with Nathalie Drago and Fredrik Lindqvist
2003	Capricciosa	Yes	Yes	Based on Max Lundgren's novel Dubbelspel
2004	Populärmusik från Vittula	Yes	Yes	Co-written with Erik Norberg; based on Mikael Niemi's novel Populärmusik från Vittula
