= The Firstborn Laestadianism =

Branch of the Lutheran revival movement

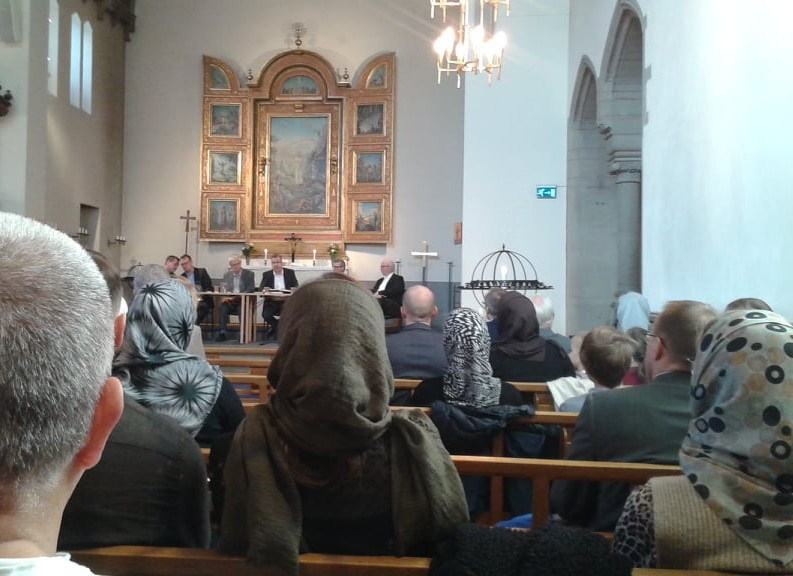
A Firstborn Laestadian church service in the Church of Saint Stephen in Stockholm. When Firstborn congregations do not own their own prayer houses, the regular Church of Sweden parishes lend their buildings, in this case for a special "service weekend".

Firstborn Laestadians are a subgroup within the Laestadian Lutheran revival movement. The Firstborn prioritize traditionalism and conservative pietistic ideals. They seek to avoid "worldly pleasures." The name "Firstborn" derives from the Bible's Epistle to the Hebrews, Heb. 12:23, which mentions "the church of the firstborn".

The Laestadian movement splintered into three groups around the twentieth century, one of which was the Firstborn. To this day, the Firstborns consider their mother congregation to be located in the Swedish Lapland where the Laestadian movement began.

There are no official statistics on membership. However, one study in 2016 estimated there were 31,000 members worldwide, with the majority in the United States.

In Sweden, Firstborn Laestadians are often known as "West Laestadians". They adopt a more critical attitude towards the Church of Sweden than other Laestadian groups.

In the US and Canada, the Firstborn organized as the Old Apostolic Lutheran Church around the turn of the twentieth century. There are congregations in Alaska, British Columbia, Washington state, Wyoming, Montana, South Dakota, North Dakota, Minnesota, Michigan, Ontario, Delaware, North Carolina, New York, Washington, D.C., and Connecticut. The Firstborn are the largest Laestadian subgroup in the US.

There are also many Firstborn Laestadian congregations in Finland and Norway and one congregation in Denmark. There is some activity in Russia, Estonia, Latvia, the Netherlands, Germany and Great Britain.

American and Canadian congregations always use the King James Version of the Bible. In Finland, the Finnish Bible of 1776 is used. Both Bible versions are based on the Textus Receptus. Churches regularly recite sermons originally by Laestadius himself.

The Christmas meeting in Gällivare, Sweden, is the most important annual event for Firstborn Laestadians.

== Division of Firstborn Laestadianism of Finland in 2016 ==
In 2016, Finnish Firstborn Laestadians were divided over views about the administration of Holy Communion and Baptism by lay preachers in their own prayer houses. In August 2016, the new Association Esikoiset ry was founded by Firstborn Laestadians who wanted to receive Sacraments in fellowship with the Evangelical Lutheran Church of Finland, a National Church of Finland.

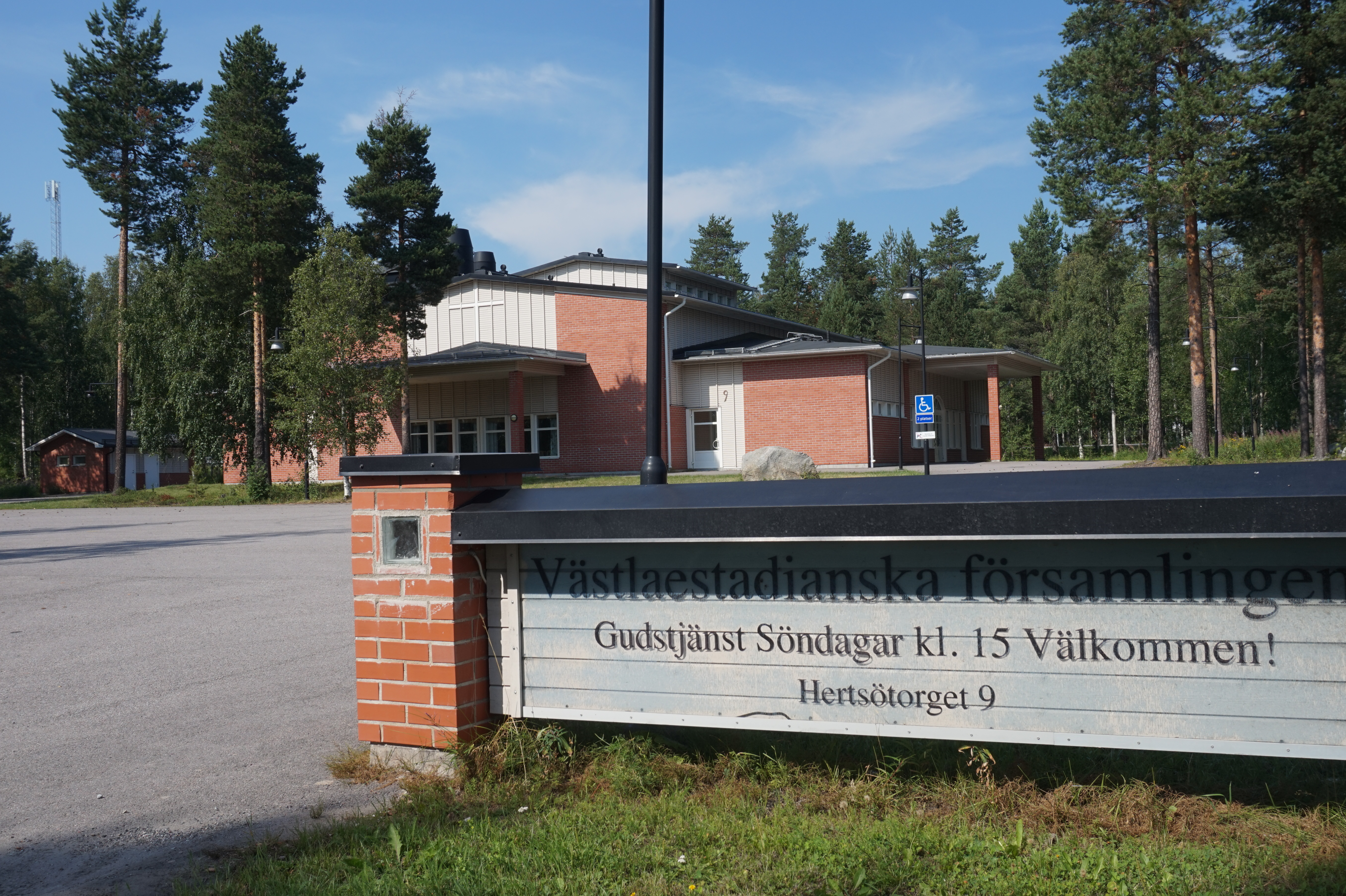
A meeting house belonging to the Firstborn Laestadians in Luleå, Sweden

On 13 August 2016 Firstborn Laestadian preachers who do not accept administration of sacraments by lay preachers met in Hämeenlinna's prayer house. Some of the Firstborn Laestadians' preachers started to serve in the new Association. From the meeting of preachers in Hämeenlinna, they emphasized that in the new Association they want to receive sacraments in fellowship with the Evangelical Lutheran Church and work within the Church in accordance with the traditional policy of Firstborn Laestadianism. The preachers' message was that division of the revival movement does not mean change in the theology of Firstborn Laestadianism, even in the new Association. Preachers said that they will fight against liberalism and secularization together with other conservatives within the Church.

== Notable Firstborn ==
- Erik August Larsson
- Toivo Sukari, a Finnish businessman involved in the 2007 Finnish campaign finance scandal.

== See also ==
- Lars Levi Laestadius
