= Bravaisberget =

Mountain in Spitsbergen, Norway

Coordinates: 77.6256°N 14.9743°E

Bravaisberget is a mountain in Nathorst Land on the island of Spitsbergen in the Norwegian archipelago of Svalbard. It reaches a height of 775 m.a.s.l., and is located at the mouth of Van Keulenfjorden. The mountain is named after French physicist Auguste Bravais, member of the 1838 Spitsbergen expedition with La Recherche.
