= Bombing of Barcs =

1991 Yugoslav attack on a Hungarian settlement

Coordinates: 45°57′9″N 17°28′42″E

The bombing of Barcs was an air attack of the Yugoslav Air Force on the Hungarian border town of Barcs that occurred on 27 October 1991.

== Prelude ==
Tense relations between Hungary and Yugoslavia began when Hungary openly supported Slovenia and Croatia on the path to independence. The Hungarian government led by József Antall closely monitored the crisis in Yugoslavia and the Croatian War of Independence, primarily for geopolitical reasons, but also to care for the Hungarian minority living in war-torn areas. Due to the embargo on arms imports, Croatia imported weapons that were needed for defense through Hungary. Hungary was also active at the humanitarian level, receiving over 10,000 Croatian refugees, and in Baranya County it organized classes in Croatian for refugee children.

== Attack ==
On 27 October 1991, at 20:51 (CET) a Yugoslav Air Force (JNA) aircraft bombed the Hungarian border town of Barcs, located near Virovitica, Croatia, north of the Drava river. It was found that one aircraft with unrecognizable markings dropped two cluster bombs about 300 m (980 ft) from Barcs. Cluster ammunition fell first on the fields, then on a football field and finally on the outskirts of town. The bomblets caused craters 10 cm (3.9 in) in diameter and 50 cm (20 in) to 70 cm (28 in) deep in the ground. They covered about 300 m (980 ft) wide and 500 m (1,600 ft) long area of the settlement. Several unexploded bomblets were found at the scene, one of which fell into a room of an apartment building. Military and police explosives experts determined that these were self-destructive devices that explode on their own within 24 hours.

== Investigation ==
On 7 November 1991 the Hungarian Ministry of Defense presented the results of an investigation conducted by an expert group: Colonel B.Sc. Nándor Hollosi reported that two BL755 cluster bombs, MK3 version, manufactured by the British company Hunting Engineering, were dropped on Barcs, causing 279 explosions, while 16 small bomblets did not explode. It was known that such cluster bombs have been used by the British Armed Forces since 1970, as well as NATO. The cluster bombs dropped on the Barcs were loaded and closed in May 1987. The cassette consisted of seven sectors and in each of them contained 21 bombs (i.e. a total of 147 explosive devices). Each was suitable for killing two thousand people and can pierce 250 mm thick steel. The commission completely excluded the possibility that the pilot accidentally dropped the bomb or that he lost it due to a "state of emergency". According to the commander of the Hungarian Air Force Attila Kositzky, the latter was excluded also because the weather in the evening was clear, cloudless, the moon shone from the south and the visibility reached up to 50 km (31 mi). In addition, Hungarian settlements were lit by public lighting, unlike those on the other side of the border that were darkened, so the difference between them is clearly visible. Finally, the intent was evidenced by the fact that the pilot made one full circle over the Barcs area before releasing the tape to clearly spot the target. Therefore, the attack was indisputably carried out, targeted, deliberate and planned in advance. György Keleti then showed a letter from the British military attaché containing an official statement from the British Ministry of Defense confirming that Britain had sold such cluster bombs to Yugoslavia a few years earlier. By showing a photo taken in 1988 at the airport near Zagreb, the Hungarian government irrefutably proved that the JNA presented these bombs to the public at an air force show in May that year (a BL 775 cluster bomb can be seen under the wing of MiG-21). In addition, the bombs were being offered to customers by a Yugoslav arms export company. The unanimous conclusion of the commission was that Barcs was deliberately bombed. Hungarian investigators concluded that it was greatly fortunate that the bombs did not fall a few hundred meters closer to the city center, because then there would be many casualties considering that 288 bombs exploded on the ground.

== Reactions ==
After the news was spread by the Hungarian media, there was concern in the country. Hungary did not respond to the attack with an armed involvement in the war, but it did increase the number of soldiers on the border with SR Serbia.

The Yugoslav side claimed it was a Swedish-made cluster bomb, trying to deny any involvement in the incident. The Yugoslav media were completely silent about the bombing. Afterwards, Serbia's foreign minister called the attack an accident.

== See also ==
- Bombing of Pajala
