= Popular Music (film) =

2004 Swedish–Finnish comedy film by Reza Bagher

- Film poster
- Directed by: Reza Bagher
- Edited by: Anders Refn
- Release date: 24 September 2004 (Sweden)
- Running time: 105 minutes
- Countries: Sweden; Finland
- Languages: Swedish; Finnish

Popular Music (Swedish: Populärmusik från Vittula) is a Swedish-Finnish comedy film which was released to cinemas in Sweden on 24 September 2004, based on the novel of the same name by Mikael Niemi.

== Release ==
The movie was released on September 24 in Sweden, but only in cinemas in Norrland for the first week, with the rest of Sweden starting to receive copies on October 1. A representative for Swedish distributor SF stated this was intended as a reversal of a common situation where smaller cinemas in Norrland would have to wait for weeks for copies of new films.

== Cast ==
- Niklas Ulfvarson - Matti (age 7)
- Max Endefors - Matti (15)
- Tommy Vallikari - Niila (age 7)
- Andreas af Enehielm - Niila (age 15)
- Björn Kjellman - Greger
- Göran Forsmark - Birger
- Sten Ljunggren - Grandfather
- Jarmo Mäkinen - Isak, father of Niila
- Kati Outinen - Päivi, mother of Niila
- Tarja-Tuulikki Tarsala - Grandmother
- Eero Milonoff - Johan, brother of Niila
- Ville Kivelä - Erkki
- Fredrik Hammar - Ville
- Lisa Lindgren - Signe, the teacher
- Annika Marklund - The communist
- Johan Hanno - Roffe
- Niklas Grönberg - Student
- Mikael Niemi - Swedish narrator
- Peter Franzén - Finnish narrator
