= Milla Clementsdotter =

Swedish religious advisor (1812–1892)

Milla Clementsdotter (also known as Milla Clemensdotter, Maria of Lappland (Lapin Maria in Finnish); 1 November 1812 – 8 April 1892) was a Swedish Southern Sámi woman who is remembered for guiding Lars Levi Laestadius in questions of Christian faith. She belonged to a revival movement marked by Pietistic and Moravian influences, a member of a group known as "Readers", a background shared by Laestadius' mother.

== Biography ==
Milla Clementsdotter was born on 1 November 1812 in Orrnäsfjäll, Föllinge, Sweden. Her parents were Clemmens Andersson and Anna Larsdotter. Because the father was an alcoholic, the family lost all of its property. After her father's death in 1817, his mother remarried Torkel Jonsson. That led to Clementsdotter to having a half-sister, Sara Brita, who was born in 1825. At the age of six, she went to live with a family that farmed, before being removed to various foster families, where she received abusive treatment. She subsequently developed a deep belief in Christianity.

In 1840, Clementsdotter married Tomas Pålsson.

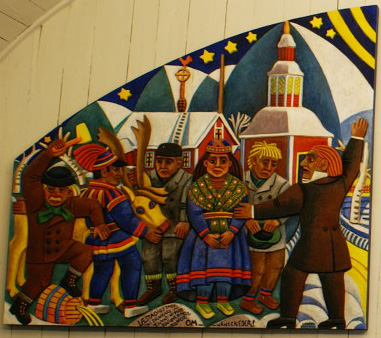
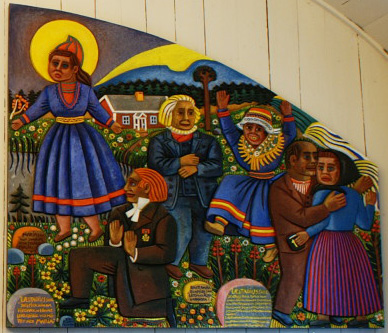
The altarpiece in Jukkasjärvi church, painted by Bror Hjorth. In the right half, Laestadius kneels in front of "Mary" which inspired his preaching. To his right is Johan Raatamaa.

Clementsdotter and Laestadius probably met on 1 January 1844 in the municipality of Krokom in Jämtland during an inspection tour of Åsele. According to Laestadius, Clementsdotter had previously met the priest Pehr Brandell of the Church of Sweden in the parish of Nora in the municipality of Kramfors in Ångermanland, where Brandell freed her from the doubt regarding Christianity. She told Laestadius about her spiritual experiences on her journey to a truly living Christianity, and recited various biblical teachings to Laestadius. The meeting between Clementsdotter and Laestadius was a turning point in Laestadius's life. Afterwards, he felt he had come to understand the secret of living faith. He was inspired by her simple tales of "experiences in the order of grace," as Laestadius himself called it. After the meeting, he started the proclamation which marked the beginning of Laestadianism. This is how the meeting between Clementsdotter and Laestadius gained historical and spiritual significance for many people. Laestadius referred to her as "Mary", and she is known by name as "Lappmarkens Maria", "Maria of Lappland", and "Lapin Maija".

In 1846, Clementsdotter and Pålsson had a daughter Anna Brita. By 1865, they were living on Halmøya Fosnes Municipality (this area is now part of Flatanger Municipality) and in Namdalen as reindeer herding nomads. In 1875, they lived in Vigen, Hopstad, Roan Municipality, Sør-Trøndelag, Norway. She died in Roan on 8 April 1892.
