= Auguste Bravais =

French physicist

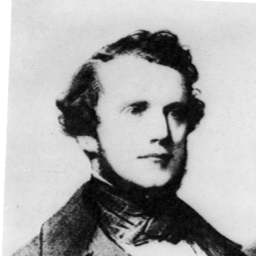
- Auguste Bravais (c. 1850)
- Born: 23 August 1811; Annonay, France
- Died: 30 March 1863 (aged 51); Le Chesnay, France
- Education: École Polytechnique
- Known for: Bravais lattices
- Scientific career
- Fields: crystallography

Signature
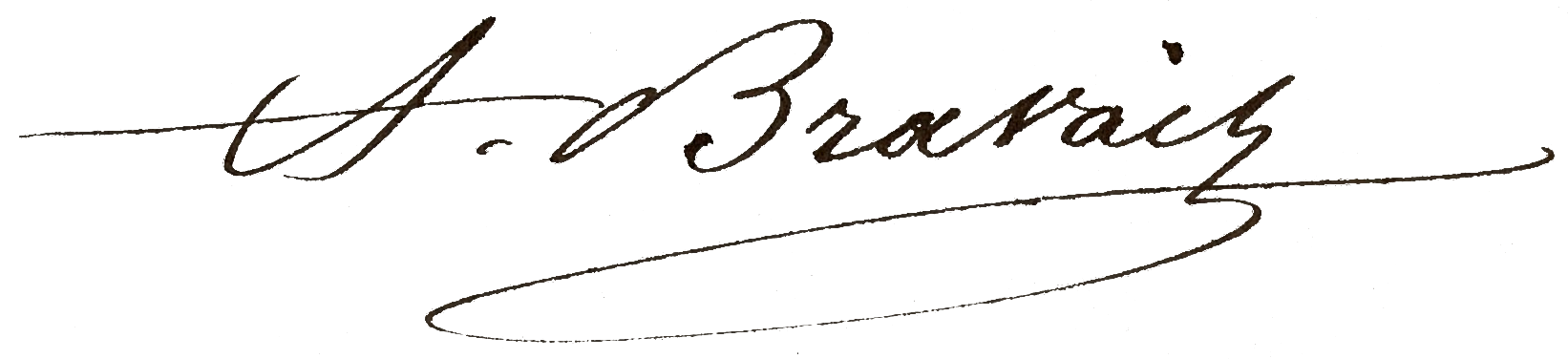

Auguste Bravais (French pronunciation: [oɡyst bʁavɛ]; 23 August 1811, Annonay, Ardèche – 30 March 1863, Le Chesnay, France) was a French physicist known for his work in crystallography, the conception of Bravais lattices, and the formulation of Bravais law. Bravais also studied magnetism, the northern lights, meteorology, geobotany, phyllotaxis, astronomy, statistics and hydrography.

He studied at the Collège Stanislas in Paris before joining the École Polytechnique in 1829, where he was a classmate of groundbreaking mathematician Évariste Galois, whom Bravais actually beat in a scholastic mathematics competition. Towards the end of his studies he became a naval officer, and sailed on the Finistere in 1832 as well as the Loiret afterwards. He took part in hydrographic work along the Algerian Coast. He participated in the Recherche expedition and helped the Lilloise in Spitzbergen and Lapland.

Bravais taught a course in applied mathematics for astronomy in the Faculty of Sciences in Lyon, starting in 1840. He succeeded Victor Le Chevalier in the Chair of Physics at the Ecole Polytechnique from 1845 until 1856 when he was replaced by Henri Hureau de Sénarmont. In 1844 he published a paper on the statistical concept of correlation, and arrived at a definition of the product-moment correlation coefficient before Karl Pearson. He is, however, best remembered for his work on Bravais lattices, particularly his 1848 discovery that there are 14 unique lattices in three-dimensional crystalline systems, correcting the previous scheme, with 15 lattices, conceived by Frankenheim three years before. Bravais published a memoir about crystallography in 1847. A co-founder of the Société météorologique de France, he joined the French Academy of Sciences in 1854. Bravais also worked on the theory of observational errors, a field in which he is especially known for his 1846 paper "Mathematical analysis on the probability of errors of a point".

In one of his later studies, he investigated the conical pendulum and the effects upon it by the rotation of the Earth, an effect similar in principle to the (planar) Foucault pendulum. Soon after Foucault published his results, Bravais was inspired to experimentally test and to mathematically investigate the conical system, leading to the publication "Memoir on the influence exerted by the rotation of the Earth on the oscillatory motions of a conical pendulum", in 1854.

The mountain Bravaisberget, in Svalbard, is named after Bravais.

== See also ==
- Geometrical crystallography before X-rays
