= Old Apostolic Lutheran Church =

Firstborn Laestadian church

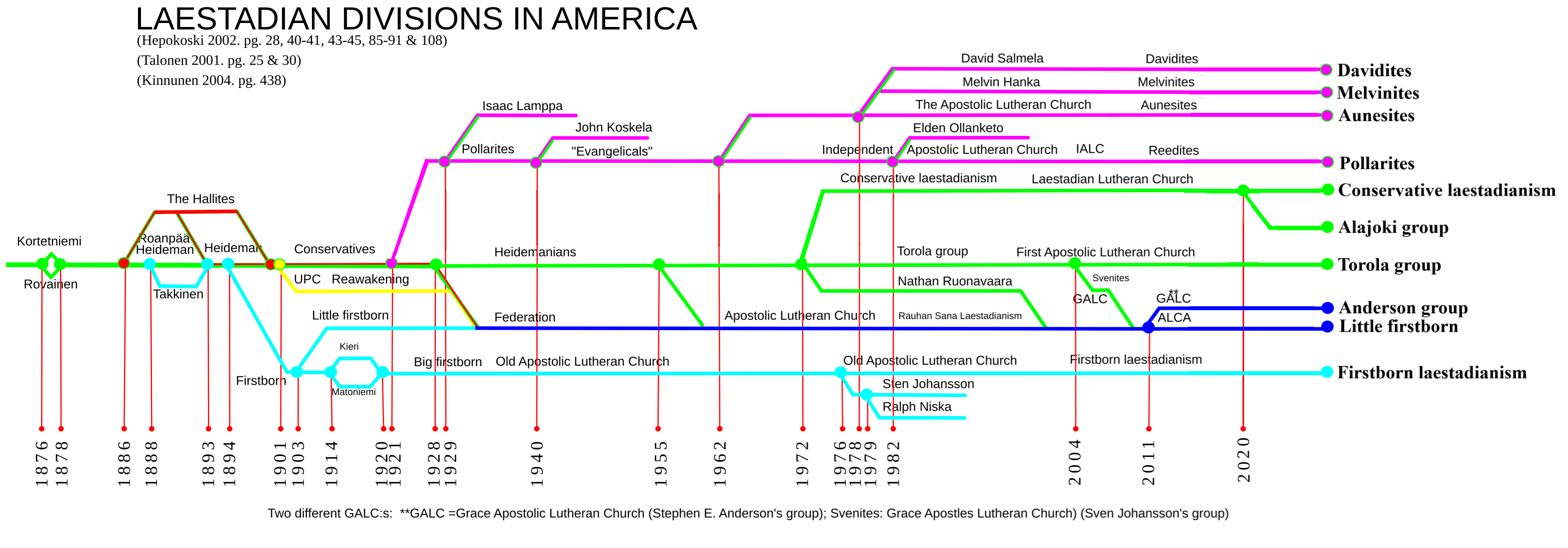
- Family tree of Laestadianism in America
- Abbreviation: OALC
- Classification: Lutheran
- Orientation: Pietism
- Scripture: Bible
- Theology: Laestadianism
- Region: United States
- Language: English and Finnish
- Origin: 1890s
- Congregations: 32
- Official website: www.oldapostoliclutheranchurch.org

The Old Apostolic Lutheran Church of America (OALC) is a Firstborn Laestadian-Evangelical Lutheran church in North America. Firstborn Laestadians are a subgroup within Laestadian Evangelical-Lutheranism. The Old Apostolic Lutheran Church was first chartered in the 1890s.

OALC preachers are not paid by the church, have no theological training or ordination, and no preacher preaches every Sunday.

== Sexual abuse ==
In 2025, articles in ProPublica and the Minnesota Star Tribune said that the OALC church in Duluth systematically minimized and failed to report child abuse by a member of its congregation over many years. The church's pastor repeatedly held "forgiveness sessions" in which he urged victims to forgive their attacker. The church said that as the pastor was unpaid, he was not a mandated reporter under Minnesota law.

Further reporting in 2026 revealed many similar cases of child sexual abuse in OALC congregations that were not reported to authorities due to pressure from church leaders, in favor of "forgiveness". Some cases involved hundreds of acts of abuse or stretched across multiple generations. A county attorney in Wyoming stated that the attitude of the church resulted in "institutionalism of abuse of young women and children."

== See also ==
- Laestadianism in the United States
