= La Recherche Expedition =

1838–40 French expedition in the North Atlantic

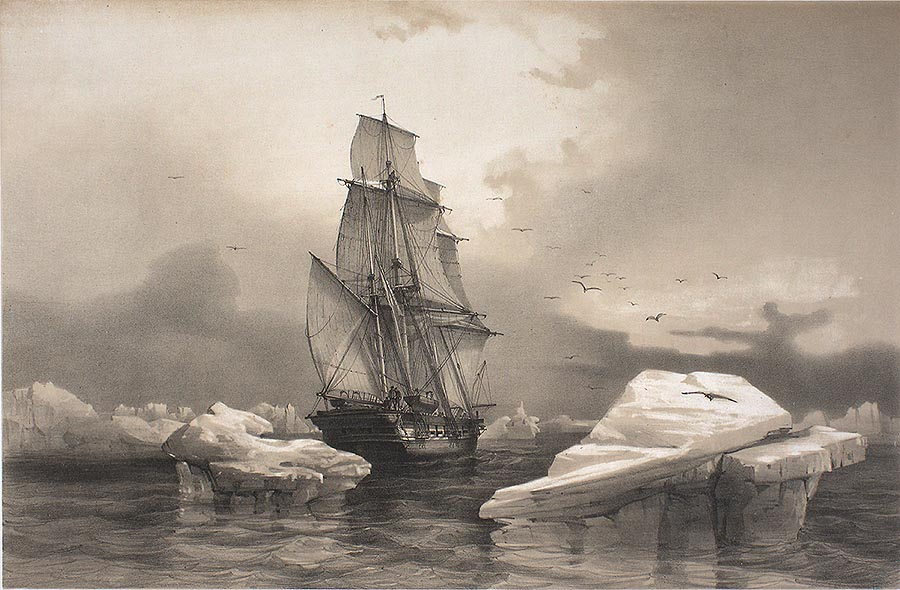
The French corvette La Recherche close to Bear Island, Svalbard, August 7, 1838. Painted by Auguste Mayer.

The La Recherche Expedition of 1838 to 1840 was a French Admiralty expedition whose destination was the North Atlantic and Scandinavian islands, including the Faroe Islands, Spitsbergen and Iceland.

The expedition in the Scandinavian countries from 1838 to 1840, was a direct continuation of shipments in 1835 and 1836. A letter dated 22 March 1837 revealed that Joseph Paul Gaimard and Xavier Marmier were preparing a trip to Copenhagen and Christiania (Norway) whose purpose was to gather additional information on Iceland and Greenland.

On 13 June 1838 the French corvette La Recherche left Le Havre in France, bound for Northern Scandinavia. Joseph Paul Gaimard (1796–1858), a physician and zoologist was the commanding officer of the expedition. The expedition was on a purely scientific nature, rather than a colonial venture in cooperation with the governments of Norway and Sweden. Gaimard invited the Sámi minister and botanist Lars Levi Læstadius on the voyage for his knowledge in botany and Sámi culture. Auguste Bravais, a French scientist and Louis Bévalet, a French artist, also accompanied the expedition. The company was given an international dimension. Gaimard had hired many renowned European scholars. The Arctic exploration in the 1870s marked a watershed in the history of international scientific cooperation. The first evidence of this cooperation was, in 1882, the International Polar Year.

== Publications ==
- Lottin V., Bravais A. and Lilliehöök C.B. (1842). Voyages en Scandinavie, en Laponie, au Spitzberg et aux Feröe, pendant les années 1838, 1839, 1840 sur la corvette la Recherche. Arthus Bertrand.
  - Vol. 1, part 1. Preface & Chapitre I, p. 1-286 http://archimer.ifremer.fr/doc/00002/11348/7917.pdf
  - Vol. 1, rest of Chapitre I, p. 287-564 http://archimer.ifremer.fr/doc/00002/11348/7917.pdf
  - Vol. 2, part. 1. Chapitre II & III p. 1 - 248 http://archimer.ifremer.fr/doc/00002/11356/7929.pdf
  - Vol. 2, part 2. Chapitre IV p. 249 - 448 http://archimer.ifremer.fr/doc/00002/11357/7930.pdf
  - Vol. 3, part 1. Chapitre V, Variations de l'Intensité magnétique verticale, Chapitre VI, Variations de l'inclinaison magnétique, Chapitre VII, Mesures de l'inclinaison magnétique. Chapitre VIII, Variations simultanées des éleménts du magnétisme terrestre p. 1-250 http://archimer.ifremer.fr/doc/00002/11358/7931.pdf
  - Vol. 3, part 2., s. 249-497 Chapitre IX, Électricité atmosphérique http://archimer.ifremer.fr/doc/00002/11359/7932.pdf
- Voyages de la Commission scientifique du Nord en Scandinavie. 1, Danemark, Norvège, Spitzberg: Atlas historique et pittoresque, lithographié d'aprés les dessins de MM. Mayer, Lauvergne et Giraud. A. Bertrand. 1852.
- Voyages de la Commission scientifique du Nord en Scandinavie. 2, Laponie, Suède, Finlande, Russie, Lithuanie, Pologne, etc.; Atlas historique et pittoresque, lithographié. A. Bertrand. 1852.

== See also ==
- Fragments of Lappish Mythology
- Lars Levi Læstadius
