= Joseph Paul Gaimard =

French explorer and naturalist (1793–1858)

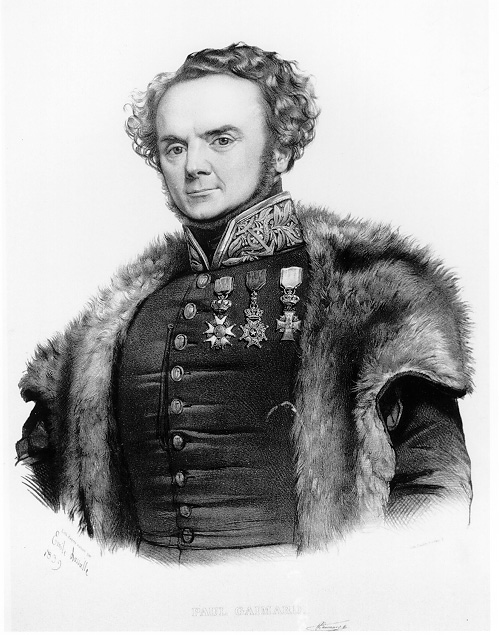
- Born: 31 January 1793; Saint-Zacharie, Var, France
- Died: 12 December 1858 (aged 65); Paris
- Education: Naval medical school in Toulon
- Known for: Voyage en Islande et au Groënland
- Scientific career
- Fields: Naval surgeon and naturalist
- Author abbrev. (zoology): Gaimard

Joseph Paul Gaimard (French pronunciation: [ʒozɛf pɔl ɡemaʁ]; 31 January 1793 – 10 December 1858) was a French naval surgeon, naturalist, and explorer. He served as a scientific officer on French voyages to the Pacific Ocean and the Arctic region.

== Biography ==
Gaimard was born at Saint-Zacharie on January 31, 1793. He studied medicine at the naval medical school in Toulon, subsequently earning his qualifications as a naval surgeon. Along with Jean René Constant Quoy, he served as naturalist on the ships L'Uranie under Louis de Freycinet 1817–1820, and L'Astrolabe under Jules Dumont d'Urville 1826–1829. During this voyage they discovered the now extinct giant skink of Tonga, Tachygia microlepis.

From his studies of cholera in Europe, he co-authored Du choléra-morbus en Russie, en Prusse et en Autriche, pendant les années 1831-1832 (Cholera morbus in Russia, Prussia and Austria in the years 1831 and 1832).

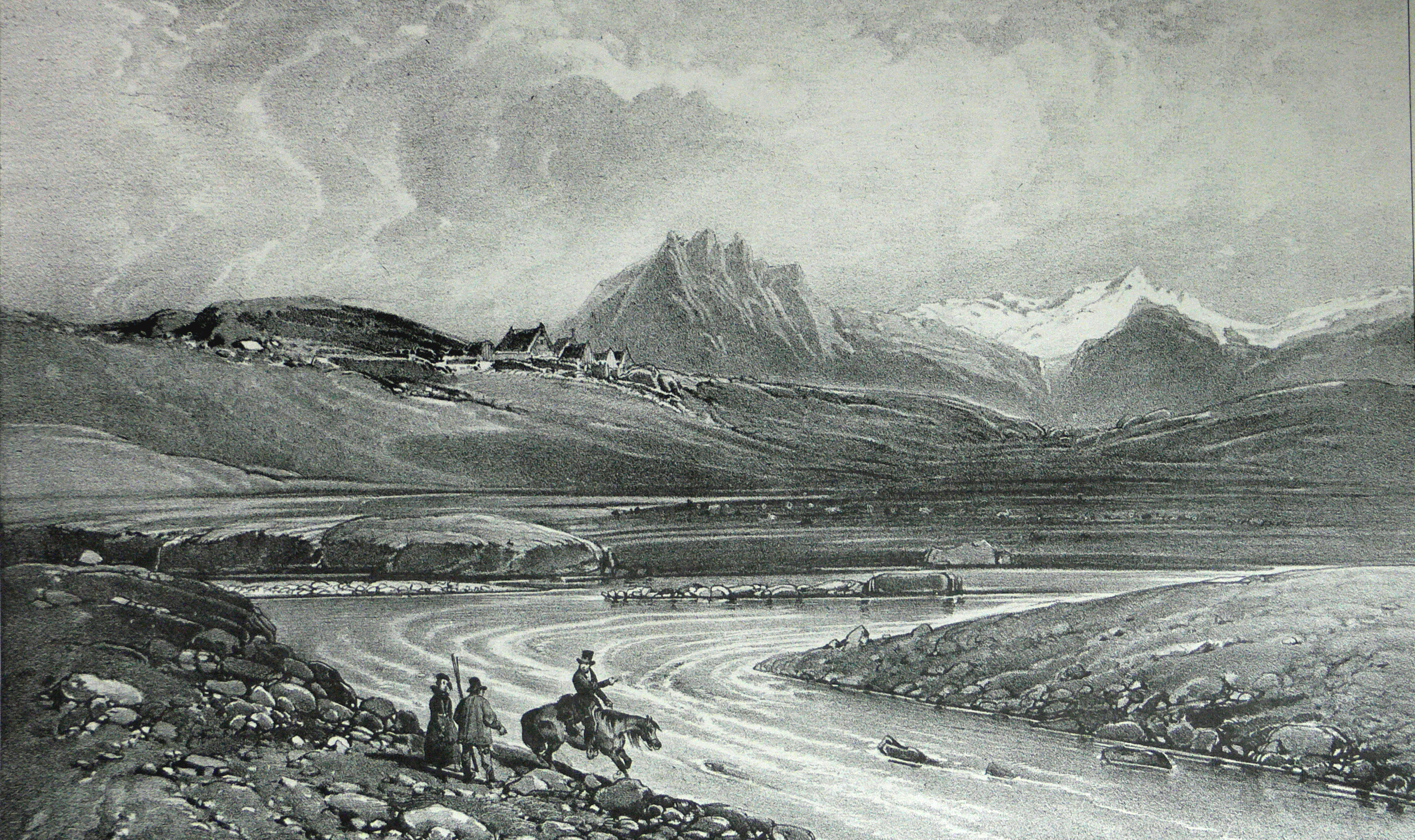
Iceland. Engraving from Gaimard 1835

He was the scientific leader on La Recherche (1835–1836) during its expedition to the Arctic Sea, making voyages to coastal Iceland and Greenland — from 27 April to 13 September 1835 and from 21 May to 26 September 1836. Along with exploratory and scientific goals, the crew of the expedition was asked to search for French explorer Jules de Blosseville, who had disappeared aboard the Lilloise in Arctic waters a few years earlier. Out of these trips came the 9-volume Voyage en Islande et au Groënland (8 text volumes, one of geographical illustrations), which was said at the time to be the definitive study of the islands.

From 1838 to 1840, again aboard La Recherche, Gaimard was the leader of a scientific expedition to Lapland, Spitzbergen, and the Faroe Islands.

== Eponyms ==
Numerous species have been named in his honor; including the following:

- Bettongia gaimardi (Desmarest, 1822) – eastern bettong
- Byblis gaimardi (Krøyer, 1846)
- Eualus gaimardii (H. Milne Edwards, 1837)
- Lophurella gaimardii (Gaudichaud ex C.Agardh) De Toni, 1905 – a marine alga
- Poikilocarbo gaimardi, (Lesson & Garnot, 1828) – red-legged cormorant
- Stenophis gaimardi Schlegel, 1837 – a colubrid snake

== Writings ==
His scientific publications include a major work on the results of each of these four great expeditions.

- Voyage autour du monde … pendant les années 1817, 1818, 1819 et 1820 (with Louis Claude Desaulses de Freycinet, Jean René Constant Quoy, et al.), 1824.
- Voyage de la corvette l'Astrolabe exécuté par ordre du Roi, pendant les années 1826-1827-1828-1829 sous le commandement de M. J. Dumont d'Urville, (with Jules-Sébastien-César Dumont d'Urville, J Tastu, Jean René Constant Quoy), 1829–1835.
- Voyage en Islande et au Groënland exécuté pendant les années 1835 et 1836 sur la corvette La Recherche, (with Eugène Robert; France. Commission scientifique du Nord), 1851.
- Voyages en Scandinavie, en Laponie, au Spitzberg et aux Feröe, pendant les années 1838, 1839, 1840 sur la corvette la Recherche, 1842

== See also ==
- Category:Taxa named by Joseph Paul Gaimard
- European and American voyages of scientific exploration
- La Recherche Expedition (1838–1840)
