= Laestadianism =

Pietistic Lutheran revival movement in Sápmi, northern Europe

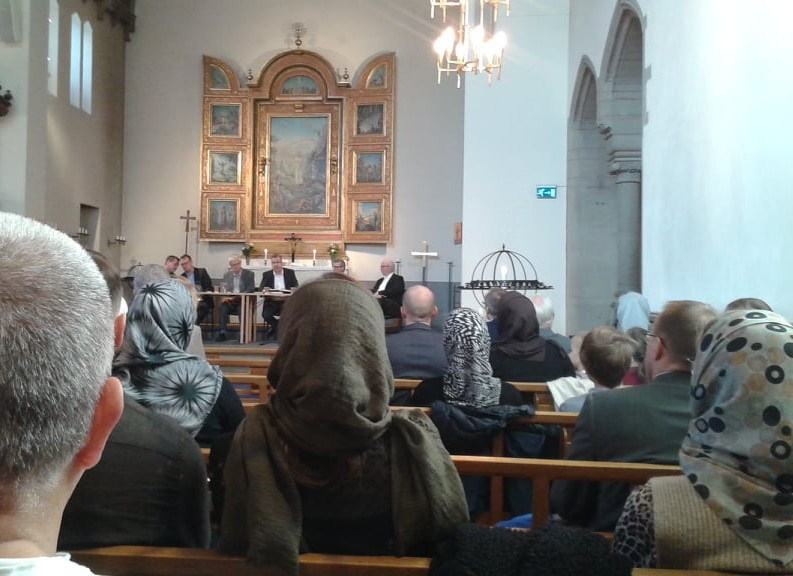
A Firstborn Laestadian church service in the Church of Saint Stephen in Stockholm. When Firstborn congregations do not own their own prayer houses, the regular Church of Sweden parishes lend their buildings, in this case for a special "service weekend".

Laestadianism (Swedish: læstadianism; Finnish: lestadiolaisuus; Northern Sami: lestadianisma; Meänkieli and Kven: lestaatiolaisuus), also known as Laestadian Lutheranism and Apostolic Lutheranism, is a pietistic Lutheran revival movement started in Lapland in the 19th century. Named after Swedish Lutheran state church pastor, administrator, and temperance movement leader Lars Levi Laestadius, it is the biggest pietistic revivalist movement in the Nordic countries. It has members mainly in Finland, Northern America, Norway, Russia, and Sweden. There are also smaller congregations in Africa, South America, and Central Europe. Laestadian Lutherans have missionaries in 23 countries. The number of Laestadians worldwide is estimated to be between 144,000 and 219,000.

== Organization in Finland and North America ==
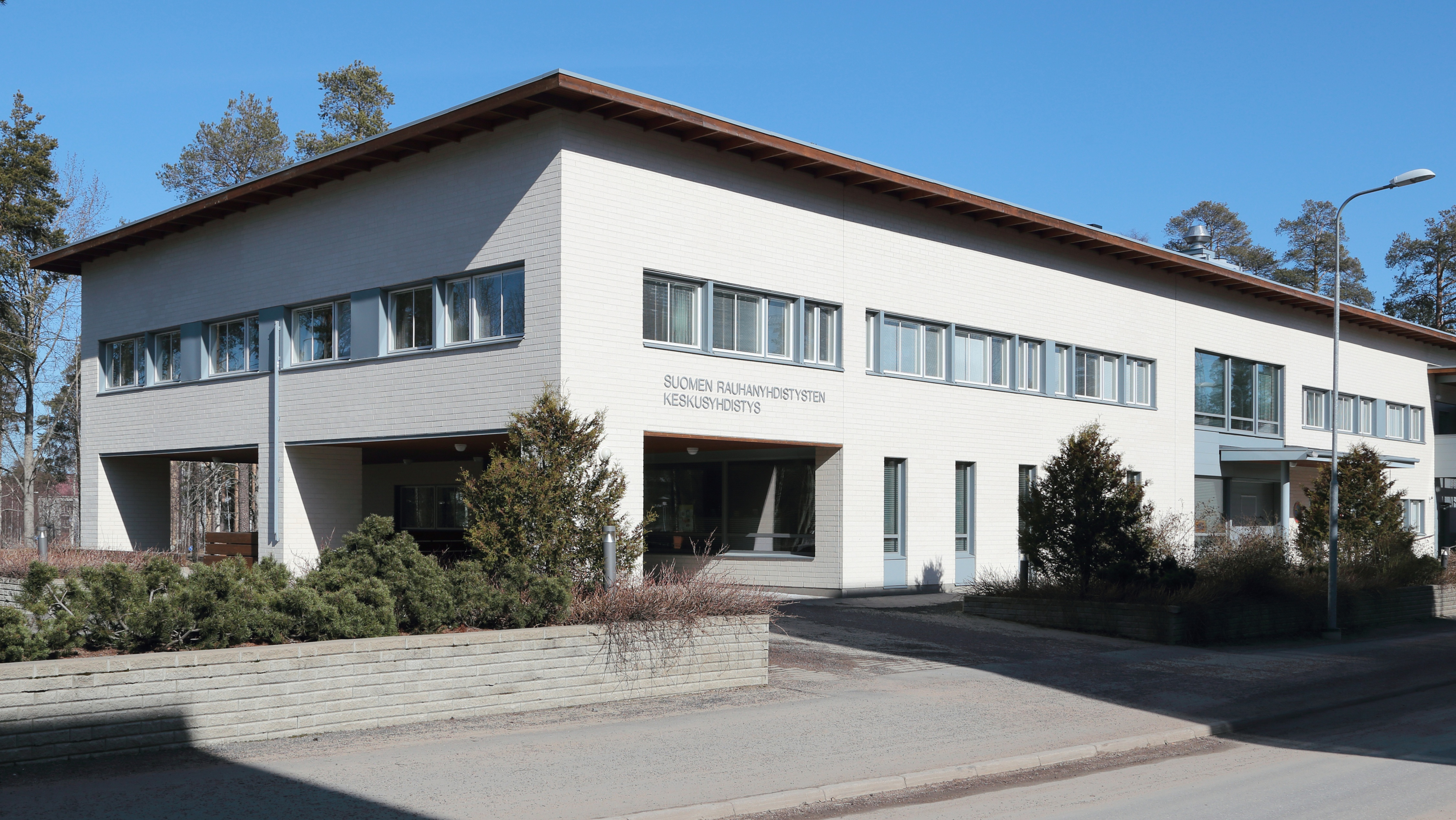
The headquarters of the Central Association of Conservative Laestadians in the Kontinkangas district of Oulu, Finland

Most Laestadians in Finland are part of the national Lutheran Church of Finland (cf. Communion of Nordic Lutheran Dioceses); but in America, where there is no official Lutheran church, they founded their own denomination, which split into three groups in the mid-20th century. Subsequent splits in the American church resulted in 19 branches, of which about 15 are active today.

The three main branches, comprising about 90 percent of Laestadians, are:

- Conservative Laestadianism are known to other Laestadians as the "Heidemans", after 20th-century leader Paul A. Heideman. They are represented in North America by the Laestadian Lutheran Church.
- The Firstborn are known to other Laestadians as the "Esikoinens". They are represented in North America by the Old Apostolic Lutheran Church.
- Rauhan Sana ("Word of Peace") are known to other Laestadians as the "Mickelsens", after 20th-century leader Andrew Mickelsen. They are represented in North America by the Apostolic Lutheran Church of America or (Federation).

The other branches are small and some are inactive.

In Finland, the Elämän Sana ("Word of life") group, the most "mainline" of Laestadianism's branches, has been prominent in the hierarchy of the Evangelical Lutheran Church of Finland: two members have been elected bishops of Oulu, and one has served as Chaplain General (head chaplain of the Finnish Defence Forces, the equivalent of a Major General).

== Distinguishing doctrines and practices ==
=== Emphasis on justification ===
All branches share many essential teachings, including an emphasis on the Lutheran doctrine of justification (forgiveness and grace).

=== The true Christians doctrine ===
Another core teaching concerns essential differences in lifestyle and beliefs between true believers and false Christians and unbelievers (sometimes described as those having living faith versus dead faith).

==== Exclusion and inclusion among Laestadian groups ====
The leaders of the two largest Laestadian groups, the Conservative Laestadians and Firstborn Laestadians, have for decades excluded each other and all other Laestadian groups from the kingdom of Heaven, even though the denominations' core doctrines are nearly indistinguishable. The leadership of the smaller third main group, the Federation, has continued to regard the other groups as of living faith, after having unsuccessfully sought to preserve unity within Laestadianism since the 1930s, when its larger counterparts' leaders called for and later required dissociation from the Federation and other Laestadian denominations.

=== Declaration of forgiveness (Absolution) ===
The church teaches the Lutheran doctrine of the priesthood of believers: every believer has the authority to testify that others' sins are forgiven (absolved). This is sometimes called the audible declaration of the forgiveness of sins. Laestadians usually proclaim the absolution with "in Jesus' name and blood", as opposed to the traditional Lutheran proclamation, "in the name of the Father, Son, and Holy Spirit".

==== In practice ====
Laestadianism holds that when a Christian has committed a sin, whether in thought or deed, they should confess it to another believer in order to receive the absolution or forgiveness. Laestadians confess their sins to one another or to a church minister performing the sacrament, not just in church, at any time, especially just before the rite of holy communion. A common declaration is "Believe your sin(s) forgiven in Jesus' name and [shed] blood." This procedure, ingrained in Laestadianism, differs from absolution in mainstream Lutheran churches in several ways, including that the request for forgiveness need not be, and most often is not, to the minister; the confession is often made openly; confession is not by appointment but rather readily available to any believer from any other believer anytime; and the specific wording of the declaration states that the means of atonement is Christ's shed blood, the formula being: "Believe your sin(s) forgiven in Jesus's name and [shed] blood." The traditional Lutheran formula is "Believe your sin(s) forgiven in the name of the Father, Son, and Holy Spirit."

==== A most solemn rite ====
Laestadians take very seriously the proposition that grace exists only for one whose known sins have been specifically forgiven, so the declaration of forgiveness is of paramount importance. This doctrine is a unique extension of the priesthood of the believer doctrine.

=== Identifying greeting and farewell ===
Both in greeting one another and on parting, English-speaking Laestadians say "God's peace". Finnish-speaking Laestadians greet one another with Jumalan terve, meaning 'God's greeting', and take leave of one another with Jumalan rauhaa(n), meaning 'God's peace'.

=== Emphasis on avoiding sin and "worldliness" ===
"Worldliness" is discouraged, and Laestadians frown on premarital sex and alcohol consumption except in the sacrament of holy communion. Conservative Laestadians frown upon worldly vices such as dancing, television, birth control, rhythmic music, cosmetics, earrings, movies, tattoos, and cursing. Some conservative elements in the church go even further in rejecting the ways of the world by, for example, forbidding remarriage after divorce, refusing to buy insurance, prohibiting their children's participation in organized school sports, and removing their car radios. Simplicity in the home, including the prohibition of curtains and flowers, is also common, especially among Firstborn Laestadians, but is not a church doctrine.

=== Birth control ===
Especially large numbers of Firstborn Apostolic Lutherans and many members of the most conservative congregations within the Word of Peace group do not use birth control because they believe that a child is a gift from God; therefore, many Laestadian families are large.

=== Social gatherings ===
Laestadians' central social activities are annual or more frequent church conventions, including the Summer Services of Conservative Laestadians and the Annual Convention of the Apostolic Lutheran Church of America (Federation). Members of congregations far and wide attend. There are haps (gatherings of teenagers and young adults to sing from Songs and Hymns of Zion and visit), song services, bonfires, youth discussions, caretaking meetings, and revival meetings.

Within Firstborn Laestadianism in Scandinavia, the most important yearly events are the Christmas services in Gällivare and the Midsummer services in Lahti, where thousands of Firstborn Laestadians from different countries gather each year.

=== Publications ===
Different branches publish newspapers and magazines.

=== Chosen scripture ===
In Finland, Laestadians mainly use the Finnish Bible of 1776, which, unlike newer translations, is based on the Textus Receptus. The Central Association of the Finnish Associations of Peace (SRK) publishes a triple Finnish translation (1776, 1933/1938, and 1992) used as both a study and a service Bible by Conservative Laestadian preachers. American and Canadian Laestadians uses the King James Version, which is also based on the Textus Receptus.

== History ==
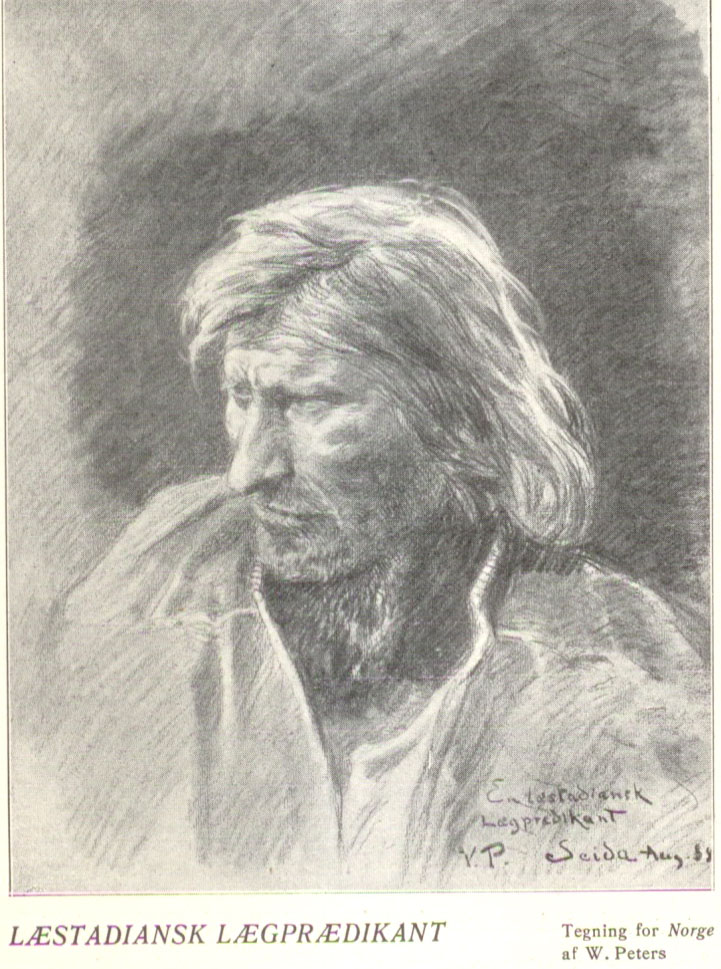
Læstadian lay preacher, Finnmark, 1898

=== Roots of the movement ===
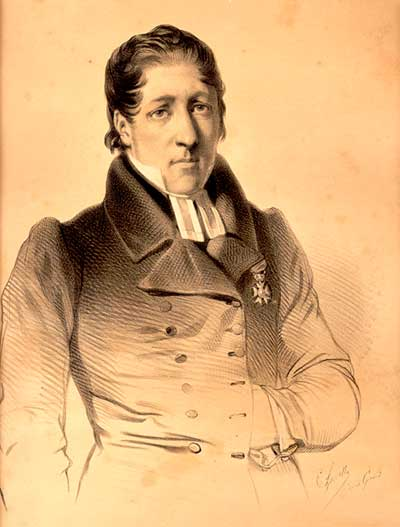
Lars Levi Laestadius (1800–1861)

The movement's name stems from Lars Levi Laestadius (1800–1861), a Swedish Sámi state priest and administrator for the Swedish state Lutheran church in Sápmi who was also a noted botanist. Laestadius started the movement when working as a pastor for the Church of Sweden in northern Sweden in the 1840s. He met Milla Clementsdotter, a Sami woman from Föllinge in the municipality of Krokom in Jämtland, during an 1844 inspection tour of Åsele. She belonged to a revival movement within the Church of Sweden led by pastor Pehr Brandell of the parish of Nora in the municipality of Kramfors in Ångermanland characterized by pietistic and Moravian influences. She told Laestadius about her spiritual experiences on her journey to a truly living Christianity, and after the meeting Laestadius felt he had come to understand the secret of living faith. He had had a deep experience of having entered a state of grace, of having received God's forgiveness for his sins and of truly seeing the path that leads to eternal life. His sermons acquired, in his own words, "a new kind of color" to which people began to respond. The movement spread from Sweden to Finland and Norway, particularly among the Sámi and the Kvens. He preferred his followers to be known simply as "Christians", but others started to call them "Laestadians."

=== Initial effect on Laestadius's Sámi parishioners ===
Two great challenges Laestadius faced since his early days as a church minister were the indifference of his Sámi parishioners, whom the Swedish government had forced to convert from their shamanistic religion to Lutheranism, and the misery caused them by alcoholism. The spiritual understanding Laestadius acquired and shared in his new sermons "filled with vivid metaphors from the lives of the Sámi that they could understand, ... about a God who cared about the lives of the people" profoundly mitigated both problems. An account from the Sámi cultural perspective recalls a new desire among the Sámi to learn to read and an awakening in the church, with people confessing their sins, crying and praying for forgiveness. Within Laestadianism this was known as liikutukset, a kind of ecstasy. Drunkenness and cattle theft diminished, which had a beneficial effect on the Samis' relationships, finances, and family life.

=== Rise of Laestadianism among the Sámi ===
The rapid rise of Laestadianism among the Sámi was due to several factors. Laestadius proudly self-identified as Sámi through his Southern Sámi mother. He spoke and preached in two Sámi dialects. He chose uneducated lay preachers from the Sámi reindeer herders to travel year-round with them and preach to them. In the early days of the movement, to find common ground with his parishioners, Laestadius borrowed the Sámis' pagan deities and concepts and adapted them to Christianity. Another factor in the rise of Laestadianism among the Sámi was that the state-mandated boarding schools soon came to be populated by Laestadian personnel. Laestadianism's strict moral code, including temperance, also appealed to the Sámi. Whole communities that had been wrecked by alcoholism went sober virtually overnight. This improved the Sámis' social standing. And Laestadianism was a faith the Sámi could identify as originating from within, since Laestadius professed to have come to know the true living faith only upon his encounter with the poor abused Sámi woman Milla Clementsdotter.

=== "Unbroken line of living Christianity" ===
A faction within Laestadianism believes the movement is a contemporary descendant of an unbroken line of living Christianity via Luther, the Bohemian Brethren, the Lollards, and the Waldensians, all the way back to the primitive Church. Martin Luther, Jan Hus, John Wycliffe, and Peter Waldo are seen as Laestadianism's spiritual ancestors.

== Demographics ==
=== Laestadian Groups ===
Membership numbers are from Talonen, 2012 unless otherwise stated:

- 1. Conservative Laestadianism 115,000 people in Finland (SRK), the U.S. (Laestadian Lutheran Church), Sweden (SFC), Russia, Togo (ELLT), Canada (LLC), Kenya (LLOP), Ghana (LLC), Gambia (LLC), Ecuador, Norway, Estonia (ELR), Latvia, London, Germany, Hungary, Spain, Switzerland, Turkey, etc.)
- 2. Firstborn Laestadianism an estimated 36,000 (in the U.S. (Old Apostolic Lutheran Church), Finland (Esikoislestadiolaiset ry), Sweden, Norway, Russia, Latvia) as of 2016, with the majority in the United States.
- 3. Little Firstborn Group unknown membership number, 21,000 people in Finland (Rauhan Sana), in Sweden (LFF and LYRS), Norway, in the U.S. (Apostolic Lutheran Church of America), in Canada (ALC), in Russia, Estonia, Latvia, Guatemala, Nigeria, India, Sri Lanka, Togo (ALC) and Kenya, etc.)
- 4. Torola Group 4,000 people in the U.S. (First Apostolic Lutheran Church), Sweden and Finland (SVR)
- 5. Reed Group (Pollarites) 3,000 people in the U.S. (Independent Apostolic Lutheran Church)
- 6. Reawakening Group 3,000 people (in Finland (LLK) and Norway)
- 7. Laestadian Lutherans India 17000 people in India (6 to 7 states, south and north) (లాస్టేడియన్ లూథరన్స్, லேஸ்டேடியன் லூதரன், लेस्टैडियन लूथरन, ଲାଏଷ୍ଟାଡିଆନ୍ ଲୁଥେରାନ୍, ലെസ്റ്റാഡിയൻ ലൂഥറൻ, लेस्टेडियन लुथेरन)
- 8. Esikoiset ry 1,500 people (in Finland)
- 9. Old Erikians (Lyngen group) 1,200 people in Norway
- 10. Alajokites Group 1,000 people (In Minneapolis and Wolf Lake in Minnesota in the U.S.)
- 11. New Erikians' Group 800 people in Norway
- 12. Aunes Group 550 people in the U.S. (The Apostolic Lutheran Church)
- 13. Elämän Sana group (clericalists) 300 people (in Finland, Sweden (SFK) and Norway)
- 14. Levi Group 200 people (in Finland and Sweden)
- 15. GALC 50 people in the U.S. (Grace Apostolic Lutheran Church)
- 16. Leskinen group 50 people (in Sweden and Norway)
- 17. Kvaenangen group (svärmeri) 50 people in Norway
- 18. Davidites 40 people in the U.S.
- 19. Gundersen group 30 people in Norway
- 20. Hanka group (Melvinites) 20 people in the U.S.
- 21. Sten group 15 people in Finland
- 22. Kontio group 5 people in Finland

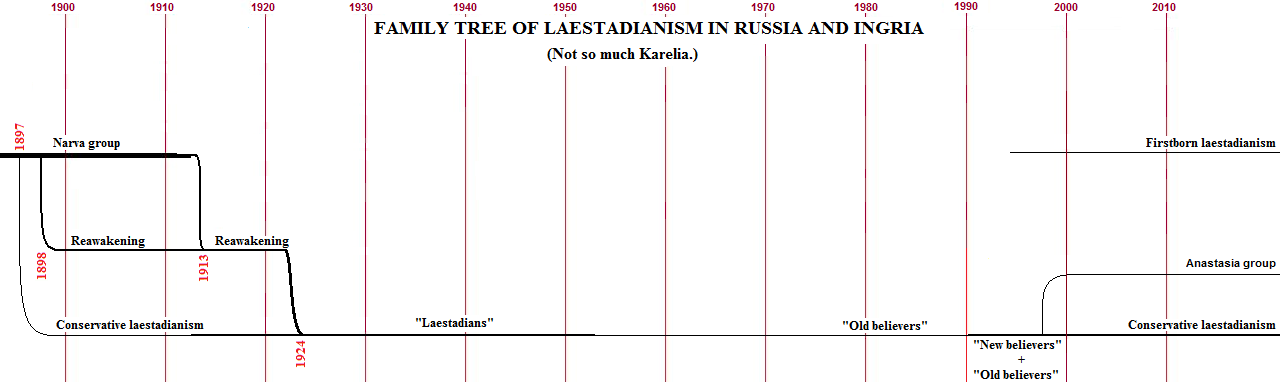
Family tree of Laestadianism in Russia and Ingria (less so in Karelia), including defunct groups

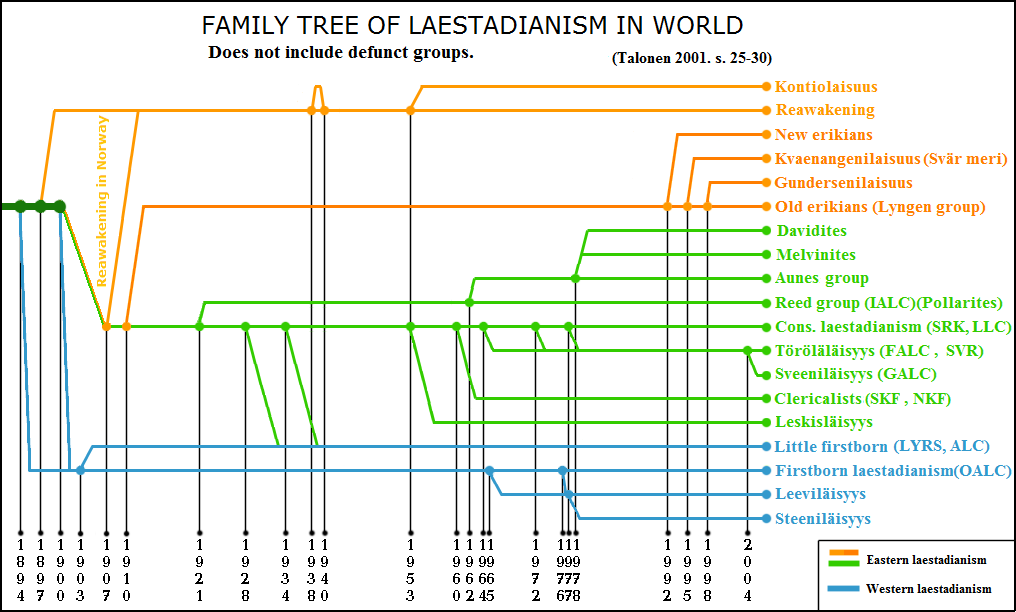
World family tree of Laestadianism, not including defunct groups

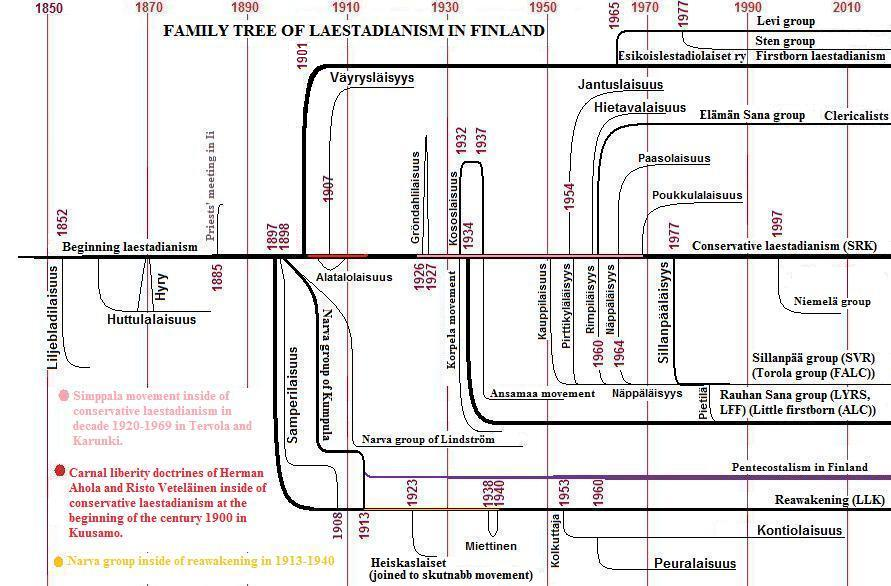
Family tree of Laestadianism in Finland and Karelia, including defunct groups

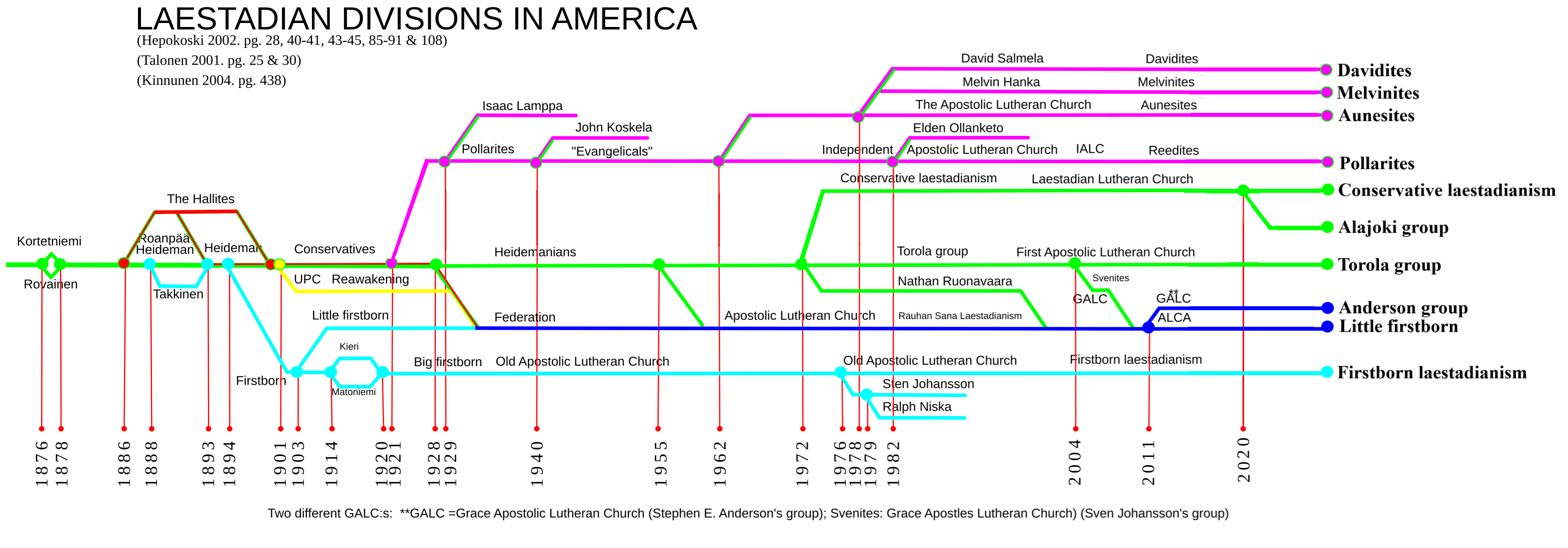
Family tree of Laestadianism in America, including defunct groups

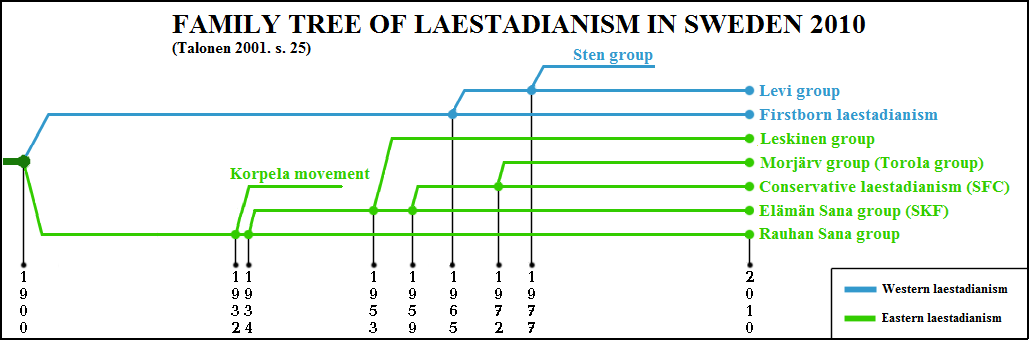
Family tree of Laestadianism in Sweden, including defunct groups

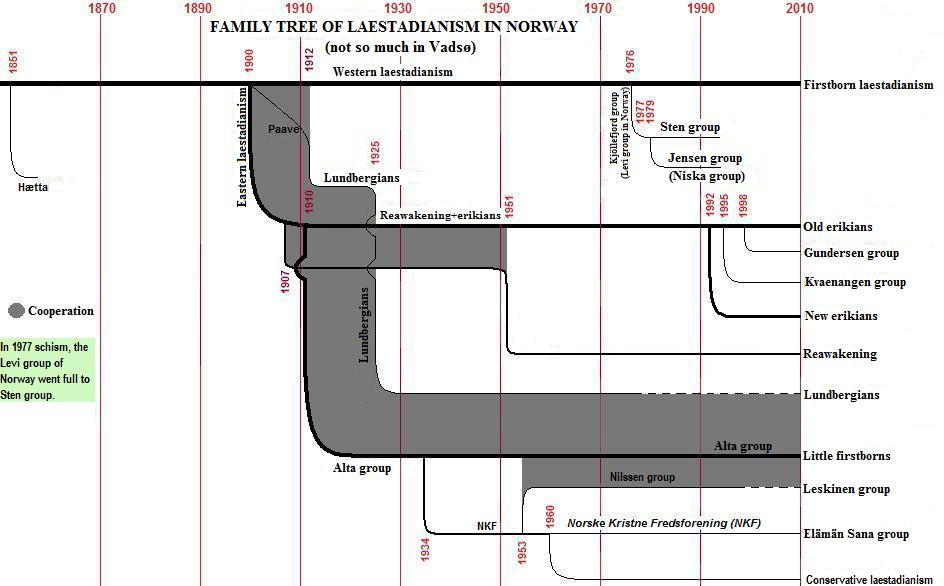
Family tree of Laestadianism in Norway, including defunct groups

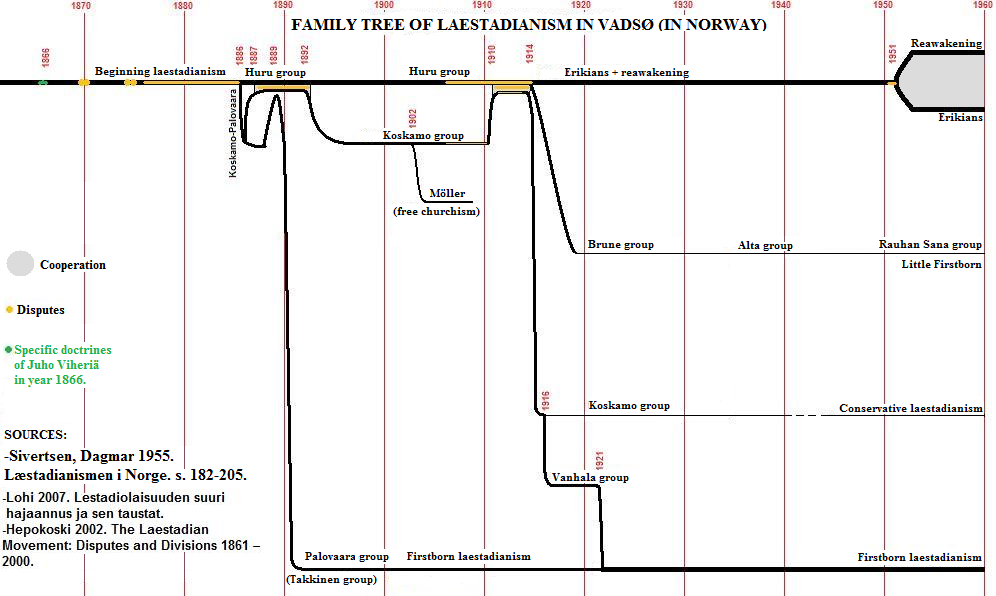
Family tree of Laestadianism in Vadsø (in Norway) in 1860–1960, including defunct groups

=== Fertility ===
Members tend to have large families by Western standards. In Finland, their demographic advantage has grown as the national fertility rate has fallen: in the 1940s their fertility rate was twice the national average, while in the 1980s it was four times the average. "By 1985–7, the Laestadian and Finnish TFRs stood at 5.47 and 1.45 respectively. Even within the Laestadian TFR of 5.47, there is diversity, with a 'moderate' group preferring to stop at four [children] and practise birth control while a conservative cluster engages in unrestrained reproduction.

As of 2010, no research had been done on Laestadians' level of endogamy and membership retention. But they are residentially and occupationally integrated, so they lose members to assimilation. In the small town of Larsmo, despite some losses to out-marriage and emigration, their share of the population doubled over 30 years to about 40% in 1991 and was predicted to be "a two-thirds majority of the town in a generation".

== In popular culture ==
=== In literature ===
- A Godly Heritage: Historical View of the Laestadian Revival and the Development of the Apostolic Lutheran Church in America, by: Miriam Yliniemi (Author), Aila Foltz (Author), Jouko Talonen (Author), Elmer Yliniemi (Author), Rodger Foltz (Author), Nora Bergman (Illustrator)
- Shepherd Boy Becomes Spiritual Elder, by Jorma Aspegren (Author), Miriam Yliniemi (Author)
- Scriptural Baptism: A Dialog Between John Bapstead and Martin Childfont, by Uuras Saarnivaara
- An Examination of the Pearl, by Edwin A. Suominen. A study of the doctrine and history of Conservative Laestadianism, it also looks at the teachings of Martin Luther, early Christianity, Christian fundamentalism and sectarianism, and the Bible.
- To Cook A Bear by Mikael Niemi. A fictional tale set in the far north of Sweden in 1852 following a runaway Sami boy and his mentor, the famous pastor Laestadius.
- Lars Levi Laestadius and the Revival in Lapland, by Warren H. Hepokoski
- The Laestadian Movement: Background Writings and Testimonies, compiled by Warren H. Hepokoski
- The Laestadian Movement: Disputes and Divisions 1861 – 2000, by Warren H. Hepokoski
- "Peacemaker" booklet in the Telugu language by postman named Murthy, Laestadian Lutheran India.
- We Sinners, a novel about Laestadianism by former LLC member Hanna Pylväinen.
- The End of Drum-Time, a 2023 novel by Hanna Pylväinen set northern Scandinavia in the 1850s, in which primary characters include Lars Levi Laestadius (fictionalized) and Sámi reindeer herders (ISBN 9781250822901)

=== In film and television ===
- All the Sins – a 2019 Finnish television series set in a Laestadian town in northern Finland
- Laestadianism – USA – short documentary
- Forbidden Fruit – 2009 Finnish film
- The Kautokeino Rebellion – Norwegian drama film
- The Earth Is a Sinful Song – 1973 Finnish drama film
- Elina: As If I Wasn't There – 2002 Swedish–Finnish film
- Arctic Circle – 2018 Finnish TV series
- Bordertown – season 3, episodes 7 & 8, features mysterious deaths in a Conservative Laestadian community.

== Famous Laestadians ==
- Juha Sipilä, Finnish MP and former Finnish prime minister and Centre Party leader, is a lifelong Rauhan Sana Laestadian.
- Kaarlo Castrén (1860–1938) – Prime Minister in 1919.
- Leonhard Seppala, was a Norwegian-Kven-American sled dog breeder, trainer and musher who with his dogs played a pivotal role in the 1925 serum run to Nome, and participated in the 1932 Winter Olympics.
- Martti Miettunen (1907–2002) – Prime Minister in 1961–1962 and 1975–1976.
- Sexmane (real name Edward Maximilian Sene), platinum-selling Finnish recording artist, was born and raised in a Laestadian family in Siilinjärvi.

== See also ==
- Kautokeino rebellion
- Korpela movement
- Läsare, a related Swedish movement
- Hans Nielsen Hauge, a non-Laestadian figure in the Awakening revival in Norway whose writings are studied by some Laestadians today
- Ushkovayzet, Eastern Orthodox Laestadians

== Sources ==
- Talonen, Jouko (2001). Iustitia 14, STI-aikakauskirja, Lestadiolaisuuden monet kasvot. Lestadiolaisuuden hajaannukset (PDF). Suomen teologinen instituutti (STI). ISBN 952-9857-11-X. Archived from the original (PDF) on 2014-01-16.
