= Korpela movement =

1930s religious movement in Northern Sweden

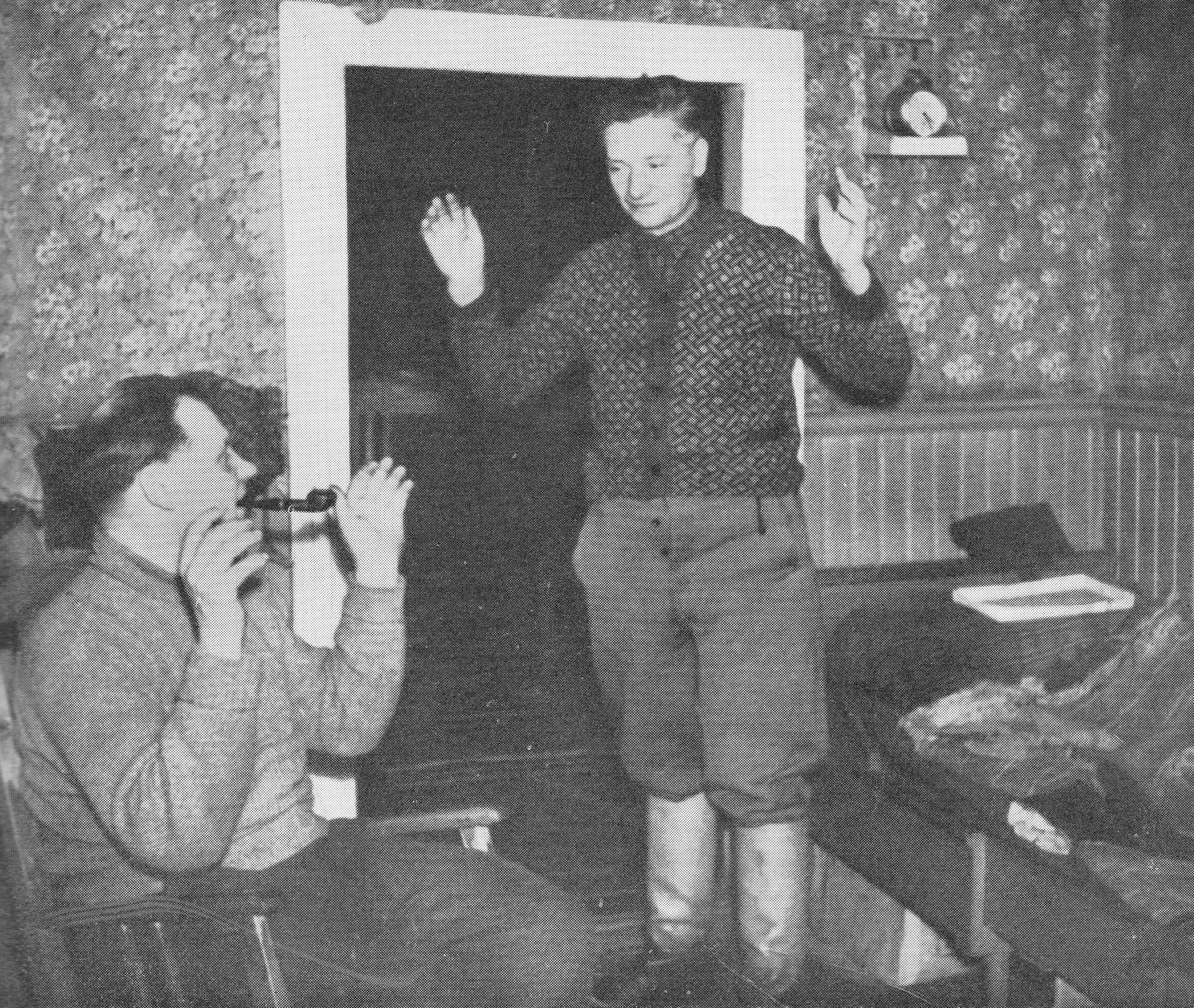
Toivo Korpela (standing)

The Korpela movement, or Siikavaara sect, was a religious sect started by Laestadian preacher Toivo Korpela in Sweden during the 1920s. It saw its decline later during the next decade as its practices involved heavy drinking and unconventional sexual activities toward the end of its existence, which subsequently led to the conviction of 60 of its followers.

== History ==
The grounds for the Korpela movement were laid in 1928 when Toivo Korpela, a Finnish self-proclaimed Laestadian preacher who had been rejected from his congregation in western Finland, started to travel around the Torne Valley to preach. The mainstream of the Laestadian movement were troubled by his activities and in 1931, it was openly suggested that Korpela could have "succumbed to vice" and that "the authority of the word of god was endangered" unless he changed his view on important matters of faith. When Korpela stopped preaching in 1934 due to his conflicting views with the Swedish Laestadian church, the movement survived without his leadership and new leaders emerged from inside the community.

One of the new leaders of the cult was Sigurd Siikavaara, who officially started the movement following Korpela's exile (thus the alternative name of the movement). More unorthodox elements such as apocalyptic beliefs and ecstatic rituals were introduced following the change of leadership. These beliefs and practices were later denounced by Korpela himself in an interview given in 1935. Following the involvement of Swedish authorities, Siikavaara was institutionalised in an asylum for 67 days, and upon his release the practices of the movement took a turn towards sexual rituals, which would ultimately lead to its demise.

Following the radical change in practices, the Swedish government involved itself further, previously being tolerant toward religion, now targeting the sexual rituals, especially with concern for the involvement of minors. In 1939, police arrested 60 people, leading to the end of the movement, which at its peak had gained an estimated total of 600 followers.

== Beliefs and practices ==
The spiritual beliefs of the movement were initially similar to those of Laestadianism, although apparently not accepted by the Laestadian community as a whole, hence Korpela's initial reaction from central Finland.

Following the exile of Korpela, his two closest preachers, Sigurd Siikavaara and Arthur Niemi began to introduce the belief that a flying ark would bring 666 true believers to Palestine and that the last 1,335 days of the world had begun, one date set for the arrival of the ark that was reported by newspapers at the time was March 14, 1935. It was later taught that the ark would not be an actual physical ark, but the spirit of Christ, granted to the followers of the Korpela movement. All claims and beliefs were more or less loosely based on interpretations of an old version of the Bible, as the new translation of the Bible at the time was preached as an abomination.

Following Siikavaara and Niemi's brief confinement to mental asylums the beliefs and practices changed focus; Siikavaara claimed to have been invested with the spirit of the prophets and Christ, essentially proclaiming divine status, and gave the followers of the movement forgiveness for their sins, thus enabling them to engage in swearing, drinking, gambling and hitherto-prohibited sexual rituals. Upon his arrest in 1939, Siikavaara was an alcoholic and had allegedly engaged in sexual intercourse with 30 women other than his wife.

These facts have been questioned by relatives of Siikavaara who say that there actually were not any sexual rituals. Said rituals were merely rumours created by Laestadians, imagining the worst possible sins.
