= Föllinge =

- Locality
- Location within Jämtland Location within Sweden
- Coordinates: 63°40′N 14°37′E
- Country: Sweden
- Province: Jämtland
- County: Jämtland County
- Municipality: Krokom Municipality

Area
  - Total: 1.50 km^{2} (0.58 sq mi)

Population (31 December 2010)
  - Total: 485
  - Density: 323/km^{2} (840/sq mi)
- Time zone: UTC+1 (CET)
  - Summer (DST): UTC+2 (CEST)

Föllinge (Jamtlandic: Fö:Ling, from Old Norse Fylingr 'little foal') is a locality situated in Krokom Municipality, Jämtland County, Sweden with 485 inhabitants in 2010.

== Notable people ==
- Milla Clementsdotter (1812–1892), Swedish Southern Sami woman who is remembered for guiding Lars Levi Laestadius in questions of Christian faith
