= Mikael Niemi =

Swedish author (born 1959)

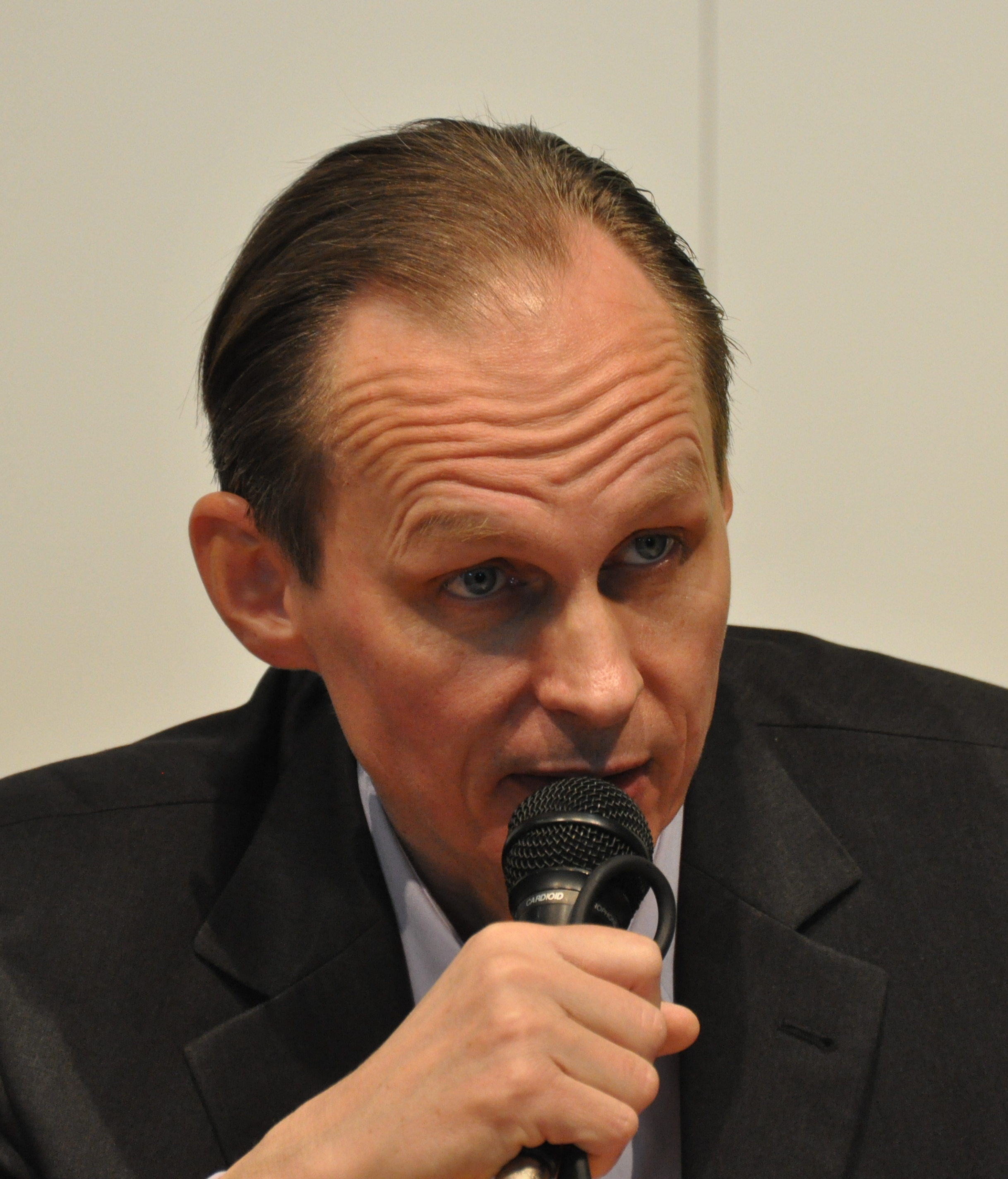
- Mikael Niemi in 2011.
- Born: Per Mikael Niemi; 13 August 1959 (age 67); Tärnaby, Sweden
- Occupation: Author
- Spouse: Eelkje Tuma
- Writing career
- Period: 1983–
- Notable works: Popular Music from Vittula; Astrotruckers

Mikael Niemi (born 13 August 1959) is a Swedish author. He wrote the novel Populärmusik från Vittula (in English as Popular music from Vittula). It is the story of a young boy, Matti, growing up in Pajala in the 1960s and is recounted in a humorous way. It became a best-seller in Sweden and was subsequently translated into 30 languages and made into a film in 2004 by Reza Bagher.

== Life and career ==
Niemi's father was a police officer and his mother was a teacher and language coach. Niemi was born in Tärnaby but grew up in the bilingual town of Pajala in the Torne valley (Tornedal), part of Lapland, inside the Arctic Circle and on the Finnish border. His father's first language was Meänkieli, the local variety of Finnish, but Niemi was raised with his mother's first language, Swedish. His maternal grandmother was Sámi. Many of his books contain some Meänkieli language. Much of the inspiration for his writing comes from his own upbringing.

He began writing poetry and novels at the age of fifteen, dreaming of becoming an author. He moved to Luleå to train in engineering and telecommunications, and stayed there for twenty years until returning to Pajala. He worked for some time as a supply teacher, and made his publishing debut with the poetry book 'Näsblod under högmässan' (Nosebleed during High Mass)' in 1988. He has published many collections of poetry, such as Änglar med mausergevär (Angels with mauserguns) and Med rötter här uppe (With roots up here) and has written poetry, prose and drama for radio and the screen.

He is best known for his novel Populärmusik från Vittula (Popular Music from Vittula), which was awarded the Swedish equivalent of the Booker Prize, the August Prize, in 2000. He has also written Svålhålet (Astro truckers), Kyrkdjävulen (The church devil), Mannen som dog som en lax (The man who died like a salmon), Blodsugarna (The bloodsuckers), and Koka Björn (To Cook a Bear) which has been sold for translation to fifteen territories.

Niemi is an amateur astronomer. He is a member of the Pajala church choir and describes himself as a "typical Swedish agnostic". His wife, Eelkje Tuma, is an anthropologist, and comes from Friesland in the Netherlands. She came to Tornedal to study burial traditions.

== Bibliography in English translation ==
- Popular Music from Vittula. (Swedish: Populärmusik från Vittula, 2000.) Translated into English by Laurie Thompson. ISBN 978-0-00-714550-8
- Astrotruckers. (Swedish: Svålhålet, 2004.) Translated by Laurie Thompson. ISBN 978-1-84343-278-4
- To Cook A Bear.(Swedish: Koka björn, 2017.) Translated into English by Deborah Bragan-Turner ISBN 978-0-85705-896-6
