= Kengis =

Settlement in Sweden

Coordinates: 67°11′00″N 23°30′00″E

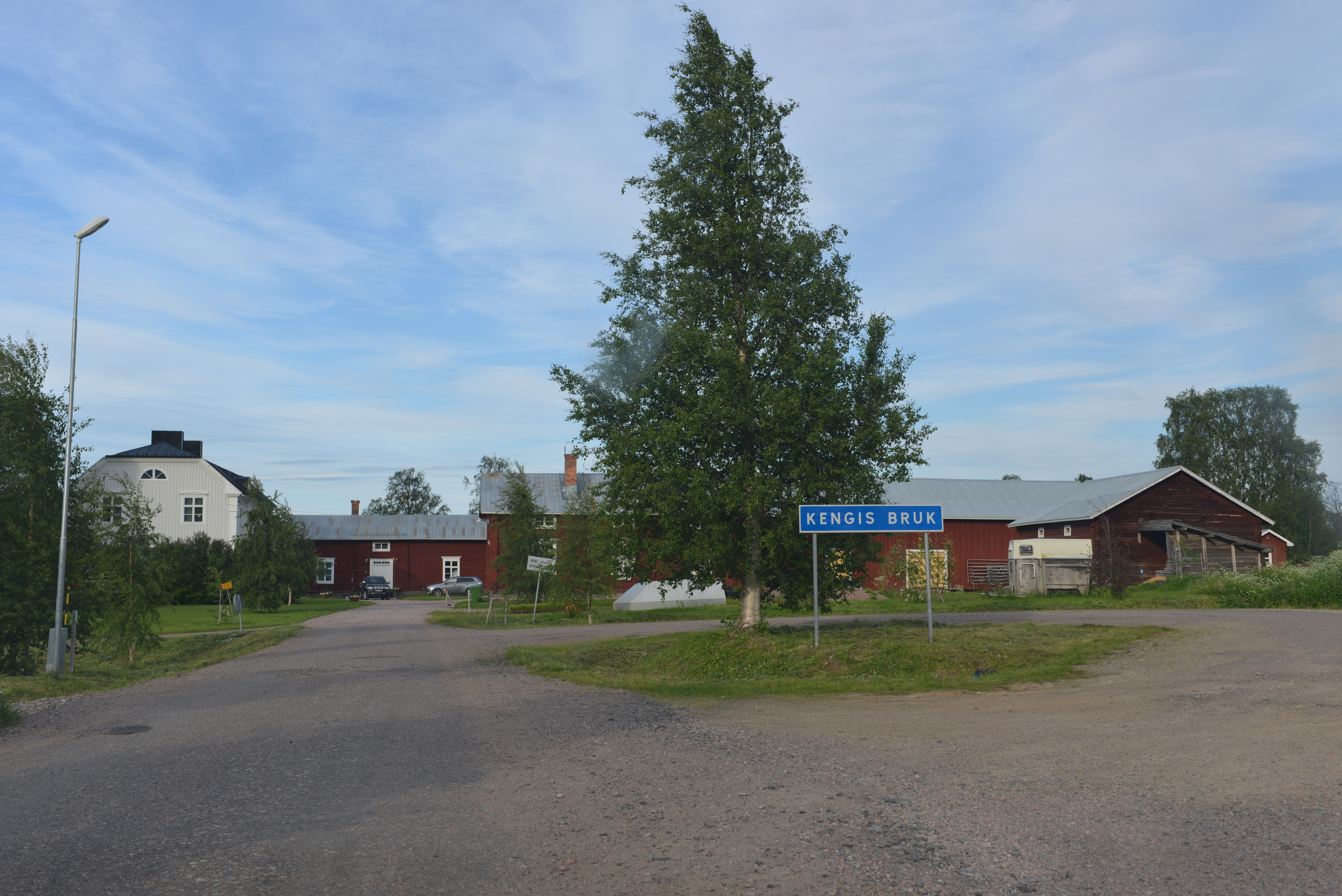
Kengis bruk

Kengis (Swedish: [ˈɕɛ̌ŋːɪs]; Finnish: Köngäs) is a small rural community in Pajala Municipality in northernmost Sweden, located very near the Finnish border.

== History ==
In 1644, two Swedish noblemen, later called Renstierna ("Reindeer star"), set up a forge in the Swedish village Pajala (Finnish for "forge village") north of the Arctic Circle. As Sweden at that time was very eager to mint all the copper found in the country, they also got a concession for minting. Renstiernas minted both plate money and minor local coins in values of 5, 10, 15 and 20 öre.
