= Xavier Marmier =

French author

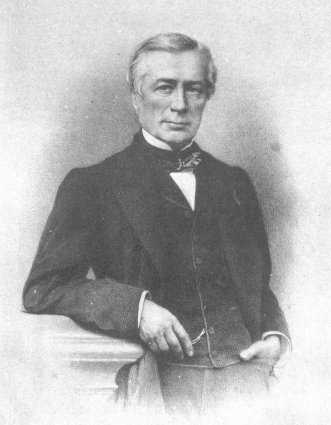
Xavier Marmier

Xavier Marmier (French pronunciation: [ɡzavje maʁmje]; 22 June 1808 – 12 October 1892) was a French writer born in Pontarlier, in Doubs. He had a passion for travelling, and this he combined throughout his life with the production of literature. After journeying in Switzerland, Belgium and the Netherlands, he was attached in 1835 to the Arctic expedition of the Recherche; and after a couple of years at Rennes as professor of foreign literature, he visited (1842) Russia, (1845) Syria, (1846) Algeria, (1848–1849) North America and South America, and numerous volumes from his pen were the result.

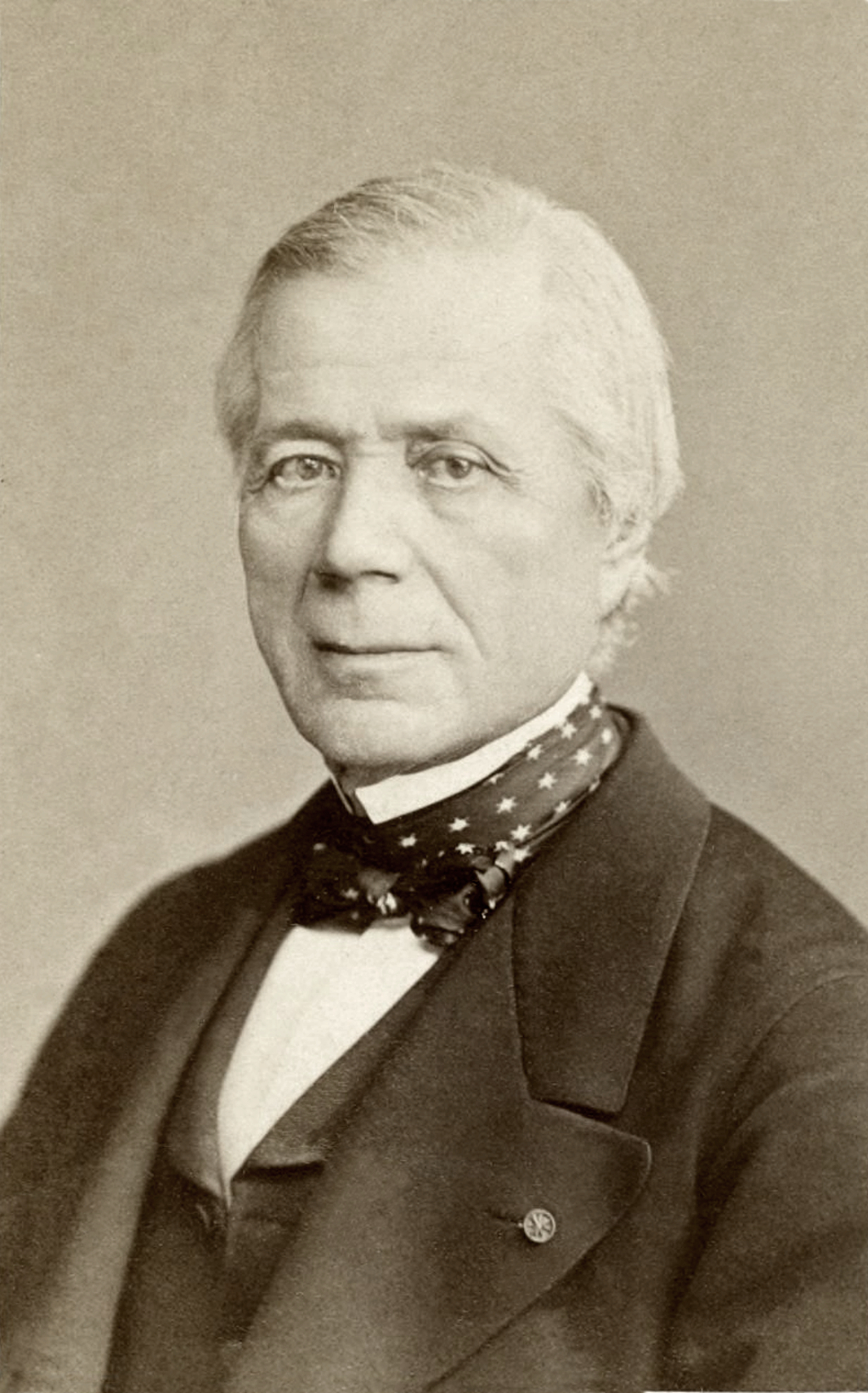
Xavier Marmier in 1882

In 1870 he was elected to the Academy (Seat 31), and he was for many years prominently identified with the Sainte-Geneviève library. He did much to encourage the study of Scandinavian literature in France, publishing translations of Holberg, Oehlenschlager and others. He died in Paris in 1892.

== Works ==
- 1833: Pierre, ou les suites de l'ignorance
- 1833-1837: Choix de par aboles de Krummacher, 2 vol.
- 1837: Lettres sur l'Islande
- 1838: Langue et littérature islandaises. Histoire de l'Islande depuis sa découverte jusqu'à nos jours
- 1839: Histoire de la littérature en Danemark et en Suède
- 1840: Lettres sur le Nord, 2 vol.
- 1841: Souvenirs de voyages et traditions populaires
- 1842: Chants populaires du Nord. Lettres sur la Hollande
- 1844: Poésies d'un voyageur. Relation des voyages de la commission scientifique du Nord, 2 vol.
- 1845: Nouveaux souvenirs de voyages en Franche-Comté
- 1847: Du Rhin au Nil, 2 vol. Lettres sur l'Algérie
- 1848: Lettres sur la Russie, la Finlande et la Pologne, 2 vol.
- 1851: Les Âmes en peine, contes d'un voyageur. Lettres sur l'Amérique, 2 vol.
- 1852: Les Voyageurs nouveaux, 3 vol.
- 1853, 1854: Lettres sur l'Adriatique et le Monténégro [Letters on the Adriatic and Montenegro] (in French). Paris: Arthus-Bertrand. 2 vols.
- 1856: Un été au bord de la Baltique. Au bord de la Néva
- 1857: Les quatre âges. Les drames intimes, contes russes
- 1858: Les fiancés de Spitzberg. La forêt noire
- 1858–1859: Voyage pittoresque en Allemagne, 2 vol.
- 1859: En Amérique et en Europe
- 1860: Gazida. Histoires allemandes et scandinaves
- 1861: Voyage en Suisse
- 1862: Hélène et Suzanne. Voyages et littérature
- 1863: En Alsace : l'avare et son trésor
- 1864: En chemin de fer. Nouvelles de l'Est et de l'Ouest. Les mémoires d'un orphelin. Le roman d'un héritier
- 1866: Histoire d'un pauvre musicien
- 1867: De l'Est à l'Ouest, voyages et littérature
- 1868: Les Drames du cœur. Les Hasards, contes de la vie
- 1873: Impressions et souvenirs d'un voyageur chrétien. Robert Bruce : comment on reconquiert un royaume
- 1874: Les États-Unis et le Canada. Récits américains. Trois jours de la vie d'une reine
- 1876: La vie dans la maison. En pays lointains
- 1879: Nouveaux récits de voyages
- 1880: Antonia
- 1882: Légendes des plantes et des oiseaux
- 1883: À la maison. Études et souvenirs
- 1884: En Franche-Comté. Le succès par la persévérance
- 1885: Passé et présent. Récits de voyage
- 1889: À travers les tropiques
- 1890: Au Sud et au Nord. Prose et vers
