= Lars Levi Laestadius =

Sami-Swedish Lutheran pastor (1800–1861)

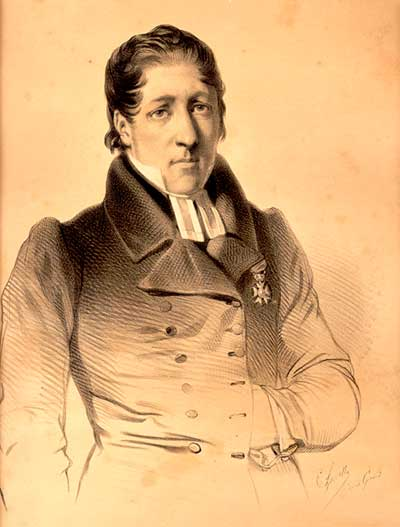
- Laestadius in 1839
- Born: 10 January 1800; Jäckvik, Arjeplog, Sweden
- Died: 21 February 1861 (aged 61); Pajala, Norrbotten, Sweden
- Occupations: Lutheran church minister; founder of revival movement; botanist, incl. expedition member; writer; Sami mythology chronicler

Lars Levi Laestadius (Swedish pronunciation: [ˈlɑːʂ ˈlěːvɪ lɛˈstɑ̌ːdɪɵs]; 10 January 1800 – 21 February 1861) was a Swedish Sami writer, ecologist, mythologist, and ethnographer as well as a pastor and administrator of the Swedish state Lutheran church in Lapland who founded the Laestadian pietist revival movement to help his largely Sami congregations, who were being ravaged by alcoholism. Laestadius himself became a teetotaller (except for his ongoing use of wine in holy Communion) in the 1840s, when he began successfully talking his Sami parishioners out of alcoholism. Laestadius was also a noted botanist and an author.

== Early life ==
=== Birth and education ===
Laestadius was born in Swedish Lapland at Jäckvik near Arjeplog in a western mountainous part of Norrbotten County, the northernmost county in Sweden, to Carl Laestadius (1746–1832)—a Swedish hunter, fisherman, tar-maker, and one-time silver mine bailiff, who lost his job due to alcoholism—and Anna Magdalena (née Johansdotter) (1759–1824), who was the elder Laestadius' second wife. Both were of distant Sami descent. The family lived in poverty due to Carl Laestadius' alcoholism and extended absences. However, with help from Lars Levi's older half-brother Carl Erik Laestadius (1775–1817), a pastor at Kvikkjokk, with whom Lars Levi and his younger brother Petrus (1802–1841) lived part of their childhood, the boys were able to pursue educations, first at Härnösand and starting in 1820, at Uppsala University. Due to their benefactor half-brother's death in 1817, the boys were constantly short of funds from the outset of their university studies. Nevertheless, Lars Levi proved to be a brilliant student. Because of his interest in botany, he was made assistant in the botany department while pursuing studies in theology. Lars Levi Laestadius was ordained a Lutheran priest in 1825 by the bishop of Härnösand, Erik Abraham Almquist.

=== Marriage and family ===
In 1827 Laestadius married Brita Katarina Alstadius, a local Sami woman who was a childhood friend of his; and together they had twelve children, at least two of whom died in childhood.

== Laestadius' Lutheran ministry and revival movement ==
=== Parishes where he served ===
Laestadius' first parish was at Arjeplog in Lapland, where he became the regional missionary for the Pite district. From 1826 to 1849 he was the vicar in Karesuando parish in Lapland. Near the end of his tenure in Karesuando, Laestadius applied for the positions of dean in Pajala parish in Norrbotten County and inspector of the Lapland parishes. After he complemented his exams in Härnösand as required, he took over these offices in 1849 and held them until his death in 1861.

=== Revival movement ===
At the time of Laestadius' 1826 arrival in Karesuando, the people of Lapland parish suffered from widespread misery and alcoholism.

==== Laestadius' awakening ====
Laestadius met a Sami woman named Milla Clementsdotter of Föllinge (also known as Lapp Mary by the Laestadian Lutheran Church) in the municipality of Krokom in Jämtland during an 1844 inspection tour of Åsele in Lapland. She belonged to a revival movement marked by pietistic and Moravian influences and led by pastor Pehr Brandell of the parish of Nora in the municipality of Kramfors in Ångermanland.

She told Laestadius about her experiences on her journey to living faith. This was an important meeting for Laestadius because after it, he said he first understood the secret of living faith. He had a religious experience, and he wrote later that he at last saw the path that leads to eternal life. His sermons acquired, in his own words, "a new kind of colour" to which people began to respond. The movement spread from Sweden to Finland and Norway across the next 40 years.

==== Initial effect on parishioners ====
According to an account from the Sami cultural perspective,

[T]he Sami began to notice that...Laestadius had changed. His sermons were filled with vivid metaphors from the lives of the Sami that they could understand. He preached about a God who cared about the lives of the people. He attacked priests and traders who lined their pockets at the expense of others... After twenty years, something new had begun to happen between the pastor and his parishioners. Young and old alike wanted to learn to read. There was also a bustle and energy in the church, with people confessing their sins, crying and praying for forgiveness (within [Finnish] Laestadianism this was known as liikutuksia, a kind of ecstasy). Not everybody liked it, of course... Those who had previously earned a lot of money through the sale of liquor saw their incomes disappear and derided the new morals... Drunkenness and the theft of reindeer diminished, which had a positive influence on the Sami's relationships, finances and family life.

==== Resistance ====
The resistance to Laestadius' radical Christian ethics and morals and to his way of confronting the parishioners about their sins was greater in Pajala where Laestadius moved in 1849; and the bishop decided in 1853 that two separate church services should be held, one for the Laestadians and one for the others. It could be said that Laestadianism, the religious revival named after him, became a movement in its own right at this time, although it remained within and never separated from the Church of Sweden.

==== Rise of Laestadianism among the Sami ====
The rapid rise of Laestadianism among the Sami was due to several factors. Laestadius proudly self-identified as Southern Sami through his mother and spoke and preached in two Sami dialects. Further he chose uneducated lay preachers from the Sami reindeer herders to travel year around with them and preach to the unrepented. Additionally, in the early days of the movement, Laestadius, in order to find common ground with his parishioners, borrowed the Samis' own familiar pagan deities and concepts and adapted them to Christianity. Another factor in the rise of Laestadianism among the Sami was that the state-mandated boarding schools soon came to be populated by Laestadian personnel. Next, the strict moral code including strict temperance of Laestadianism appealed to the Sami. Whole communities that had been wrecked by alcoholism went dry virtually overnight. This had the added positive effect of improving the Samis' social standing with the outside world.

Finally, Laestadianism was a faith that the Sami could identify as originating from within insofar that Laestadius himself professed to have come to know the true living faith only upon his encounter with Milla Clementsdotter.

==== Successor ====
Awards
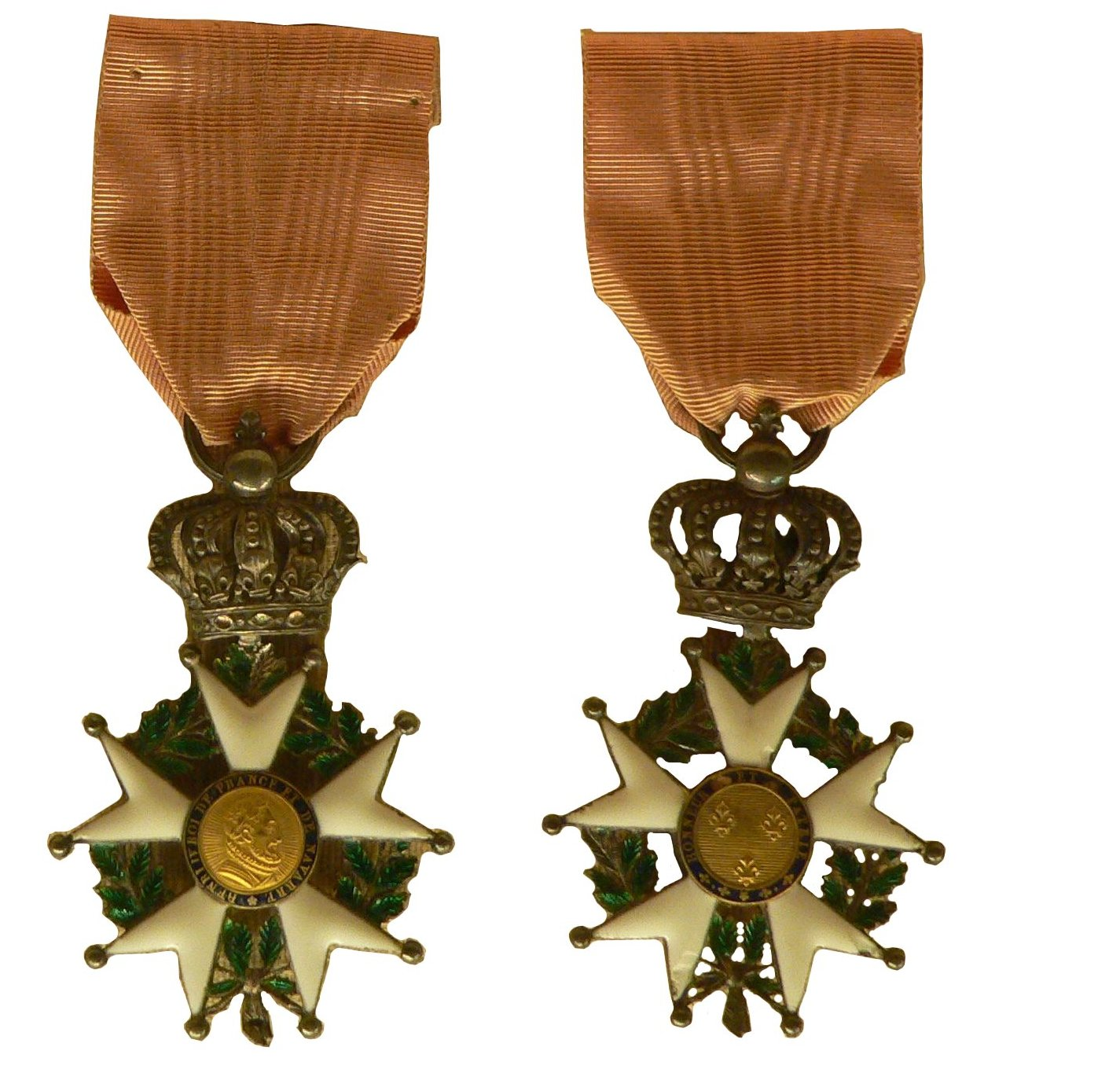
- Medal of honor of the Legion of Honor of France after 1841

When Laestadius died in 1861, he was succeeded by Johan Raattamaa as the leader of the Laestadian movement.

== Botanist ==
Laestadius undertook his first botanic trip as a student. Later the Royal Swedish Academy of Sciences paid him to travel to Skåne in southern Sweden and to Lapland, to study and make drawings of plants, to be used in Swedish botany scientific work. He was as an internationally recognized botanist and a member of the Edinburgh Botanical Society as well as the Royal Society of Sciences in Uppsala.

A number of plant species have been named for Laestadius, e.g.:

- Salix laestadiana Hartm.
- Carex laestadii Holmb.
- Papaver laestadianum Nordh.

Laestadius named many plant species: List of plants named by Laestadius in IPNI

== La Recherche Expedition (1838–1840) ==
While attending to his pastoral duties, Laestadius continued his interest in botany and authored a number of articles on plant life in Lapland. Because of the wide recognition for his knowledge of botany and the Sami, the French Admiralty invited Laestadius to participate in the La Recherche Expedition to Samiland of 1838–1840. As an expedition member, Laestadius served as field guide for the islands and the interior of Northern Norway and Sweden, studying both plant life and the culture of the Sami inhabitants.

During the expedition, Laestadius at the request of the organizers began his manuscript. Eventually published for the first time more than 150 years later Fragments of Lappish Mythology provides a snapshot of Sami traditional religious beliefs that by the 1830s were passing into history due to the Church of Sweden's Christianization mandate in full swing at that time. However, Laestadius did not finish the manuscript until long afterward, and the completed work was lost for many years. Due to these and other reasons, the manuscript was not published until 1997, over 150 years after the expedition.

For his participation in the La Recherche Expedition, Laestadius was awarded the Medal of Honor of the Legion of Honor of France after 1841. He was the first Scandinavian to receive this honor.

== Languages spoken ==
Laestadius' mother tongues were Southern Sami from his mother and Swedish, the language of his childhood home, from his father. Laestadius also spoke Pite Sami. After a year in Karesuando, Laestadius spoke Finnish and Northern Sami as well. He usually held his services in Finnish since it was the most widespread language in the area, but on occasion also preached in the Northern Sami and Swedish languages.

== Family deaths and personal illnesses ==
After the death of his older half-brother and financial support, Carl Erik, when Lars Levi was only a teenager, Laestadius mourned the deaths of his mother in 1824, his father in 1832, and his younger brother Petrus in 1841. At least two of Laestadius' own sons reportedly predeceased him as well.

Around 1833 Laestadius suffered from an ailment which the doctors first thought was pneumonia. He recovered. In the 1840s, Laestadius suffered from severe typhoid fever and later tuberculosis. Towards the end of his life, Laestadius experienced "impending blindness" and contracted a cholera-like illness.

== Books authored ==
- Fragments of Lappish Mythology (1997); ISBN 0-9685881-9-0
- The Voice of One Crying in the Wilderness (A Periodical Published in the Years 1852–1854) (in original Swedish, Ens ropandes röst i öknen 1852–1854)

== Literature ==
- Gustaf Dahlbäck, Den gamla och nya människan i Lars Levi Læstadius teologi, 1949
- Lilly Anne Østtveit Elgvin, Lars Levi Læstadius' spiritualitet (Summary: The spirituality of L L Læstadius), 2010.
- Olle Franzén, Naturalhistorikern Lars Levi Læstadius, 1973
- Seppo Lohi, Sydämen kristillisyys Lars Levi Læstadius ja læstadiolainen herätyksen alkuvaiheet, 2000.
- Hannu Juntunen, Lars Levi Læstadiuksen käsitys kirkosta, 1982
- Kristina Nilsson, Den himmelske föräldern. En studie av kvinnans betydelse för Lars Levi Læstadius teologi och förkunnelse, 1988.
- Henning Thulin, Lars Levi Læstadius och hans förkunnelse, 1949
- Gunnar Wikmark, Lars Levi Læstadius’ väg till den nya födelsen, 1980

== See also ==
- La Recherche Expedition (1838–1840)
- Læstadiuspörtet
- Native American temperance activists
