= Popular Music from Vittula =

Literary work

- First edition
- Author: Mikael Niemi
- Original title: Populärmusik från Vittula
- Translator: Laurie Thompson
- Language: Swedish
- Publisher: Norstedts Förlag
- Publication date: 2000
- Publication place: Sweden
- English publication date: 2003
- ISBN: 978-1583226599

Popular Music from Vittula (Swedish: Populärmusik från Vittula; Meänkieli: Poppimysiikkiä Vittulasta; Finnish: Populäärimusiikkia Vittulajänkältä) is a novel by Mikael Niemi. It was published in Sweden in 2000, the English translation by Laurie Thompson followed in 2003. A film based on the book was released in 2004.

The book won the 2000 August Prize.
