= Association of Peace =

An Association of Peace (Finnish: rauhanyhdistys) is an official grouping of conservative Laestadians. In Europe there are 214 Associations of Peace: 179 in Finland, eight in Russia, five in Sweden, one in Norway and one in Estonia. There are also three central organizations: SRK (Suomen Rauhanyhdistysten Keskusyhdistys) in Finland, SFC (Sveriges fridsföreningars centralorganisation) in Sweden and Estonian Lutheran Association of Peace in Estonia. The Laestadian Lutheran Church does mission work worldwide in collaboration with Association of Peace organizations.

== See also ==
- Laestadianism in America
