= Lumijoki =

Municipality of Finland

- Municipality
- Lumijoen kunta Lumijoki kommun
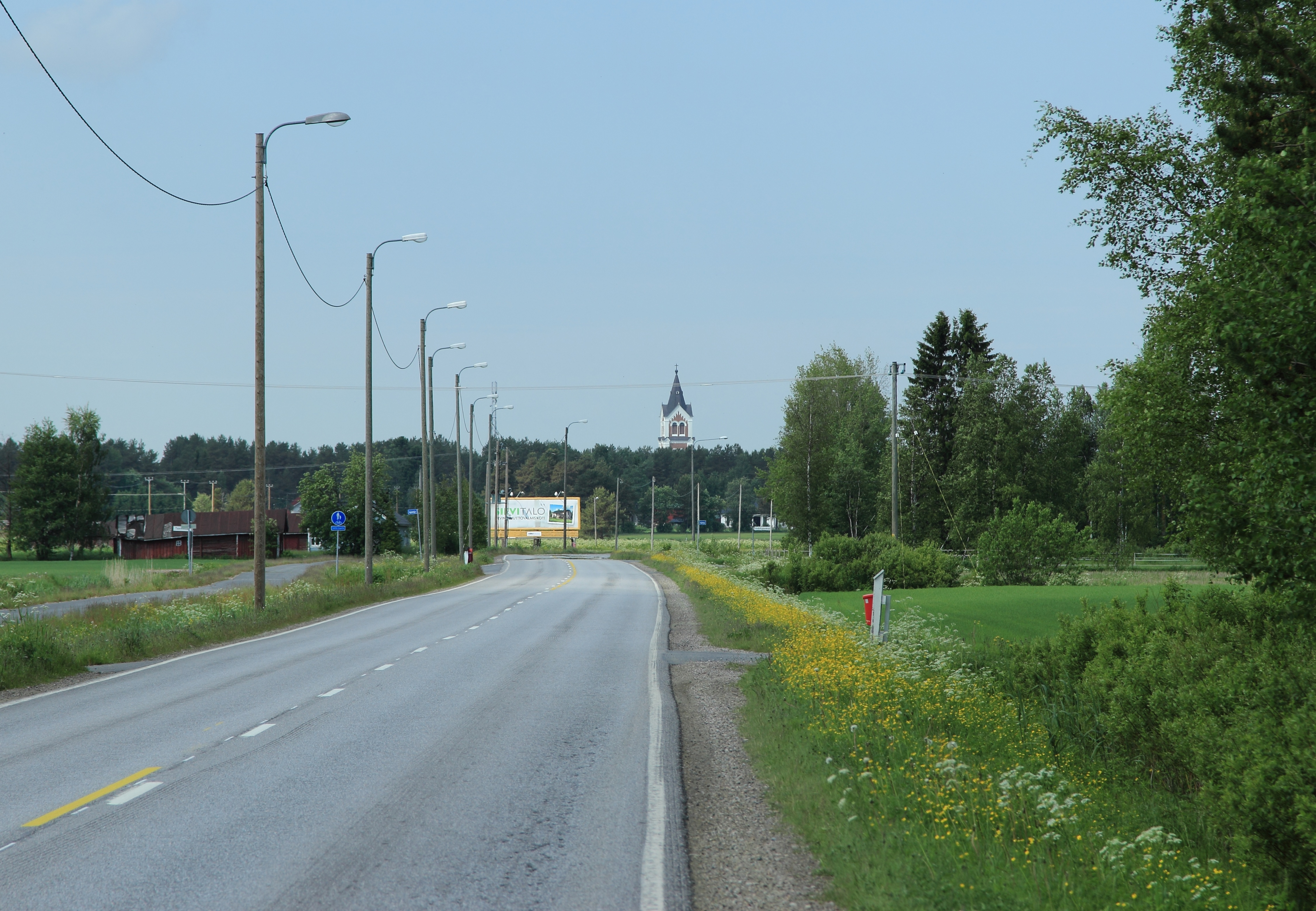
- Route 813 in Lumijoki

- Coat of arms

- Location of Lumijoki in Finland
- Interactive map of Lumijoki
- Coordinates: 64°50.2′N 025°11.2′E
- Country: Finland
- Region: North Ostrobothnia
- Sub-region: Oulu
- Charter: 1867

Government
  - Municipal manager: Paula Karsi-Ruokolainen

Area (2018-01-01)
  - Total: 290.29 km^{2} (112.08 sq mi)
  - Land: 214.12 km^{2} (82.67 sq mi)
  - Water: 77.1 km^{2} (29.8 sq mi)
  - Rank: 259th largest in Finland

Population (2025-12-31)
  - Total: 2,018
  - Rank: 255th largest in Finland
  - Density: 9.42/km^{2} (24.4/sq mi)

Population by native language
  - Finnish: 95.9% (official)
  - Others: 4.1%

Population by age
  - 0 to 14: 27%
  - 15 to 64: 54.4%
  - 65 or older: 18.6%
- Time zone: UTC+02:00 (EET)
  - Summer (DST): UTC+03:00 (EEST)
- Website: www.lumijoki.fi

Lumijoki (Finnish pronunciation: [ˈlumiˌjoki]; lit. 'snow river') is a municipality of Finland. It is located in the Northern Ostrobothnia region. The municipality has a population of 2,018 (31 December 2025) and covers an area of 290.29 square kilometres (112.08 sq mi) of which 77.1 km^{2} (29.8 sq mi) is water. The population density is 9.42 inhabitants per square kilometre (24.4/sq mi).

Neighbouring municipalities are Hailuoto, Liminka, Oulu and Siikajoki. The municipality is unilingually Finnish.

In the 1980s, the traditional local dishes of Lumijoki were meat soup called lahtivelli, and buttermilk gruel seasoned with rice called huttuvelli.

== History ==
Lumijoki literally means "snow river", most likely through Lumijärvi, the lake from which the river Lumijoki once began from. Toponyms with the word lumi usually refer to areas where the snow stays for longer than in nearby areas. The village was first mentioned in 1548, when it was a part of the Liminka parish. It gained chapel rights in 1640, eventually becoming an independent parish and municipality in 1867.

The summer services of the Conservative Laestadianism community were held in Lumijoki in 2011, and over 80,000 people attended.
