= Estonian Lutheran Association of Peace =

Organization based in Estonia

The Estonian Lutheran Association of Peace (Estonian: Eesti Luterlik Rahuühendus) is a conservative laestadian organization in Estonia headquartered in Tartu. The purpose of the association is to awaken and strengthen the Christian faith among people, to help spread the Christian way of life, general abstinence and obedience to the law. The association organizes meetings based on the Bible, Luther's confession and teachings. It does mission work in Tallinn, Tartu and Southeast Estonia.

In the second half of the 19th century, Laestadianism spread to Estonia – especially to Viru County and Tallinn, and several Laestadist groups emerged.

The association brings together conservative Laestadists in Estonia, while other Laestadians in Estonia operate under the auspices of the Evangelical Lutheran Church of Finland. It has also sister organizations in Sweden and North America.

== See also ==
- Conservative Laestadianism
- Laestadianism
- Laestadianism in America
- Association of Peace
- SRK, Suomen rauhanyhdistysten keskusyhdistys
- SFC, Sveriges fridsföreningars centralorganisation
- Laestadian Lutheran Church
