= Michael Hahn'sche Community =

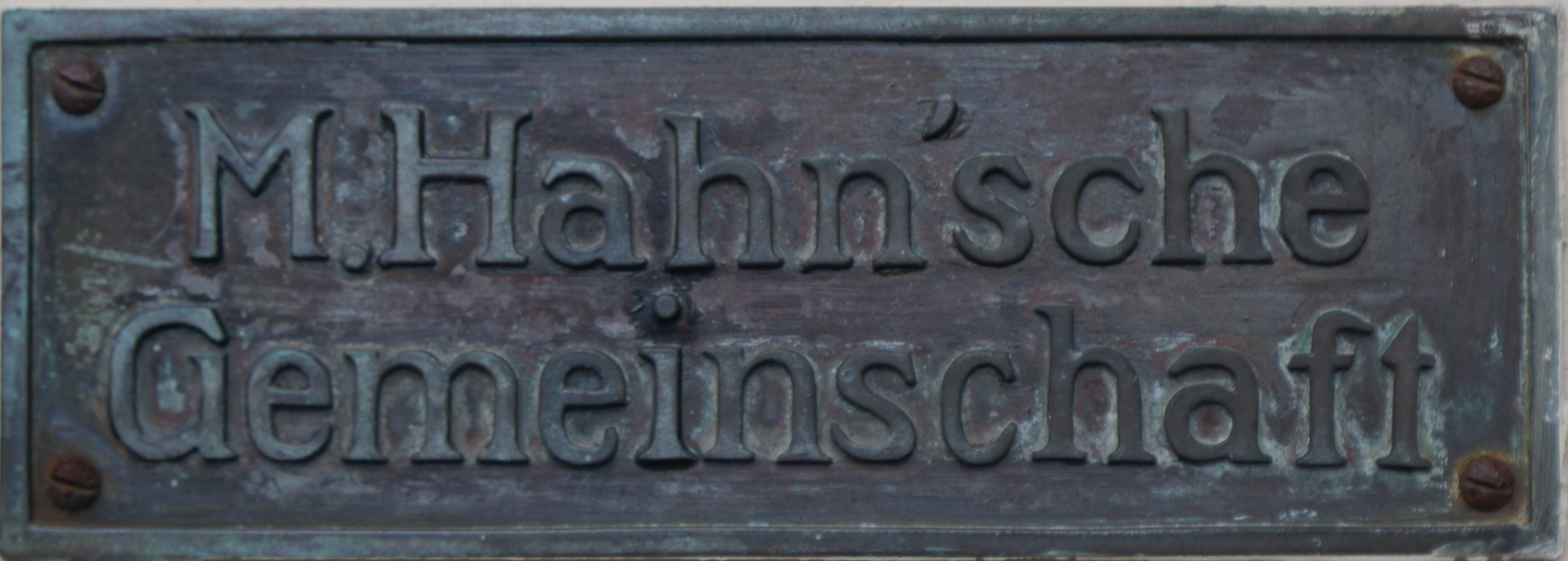
Doorsign in Pfarrgasse nr. 4 in Böblingen.

The Michael Hahn’sche Community (Michael Hahn’sche Gemeinschaft), also known as the Hahn’sche Brüder (Hahn’sche Brethren) or Michelianer (Michelians), is a movement of evangelical Christians founded by Johann Michael Hahn and arising from Swabian Pietism. It consists of 225 local communities, most of them in Baden-Württemberg.

== History ==
The community is named after Johann Michael Hahn (1758-1819). At the age of 20, he experienced his first 'central vision.' Additional visions occurred, of which he spoke in pietist meetings. Many people flocked to the so-called Erbauungsstunden (a pietist meeting which typically lasts one hour), in which Hahn interpreted the Bible. After his death, they gave themselves the name "The Michael Hahn'sche Community." At the beginning of the 19th century, many pietist communities even wanted to part with the Evangelical Lutheran Church in Württemberg and emigrate to the Holy Land to await the nearness of God. Hahn, however, strongly discouraged a mass emigration, and prevented the separation of the community from the regional church.
