= Nivala =

- Town
- Nivalan kaupunki Nivala stad
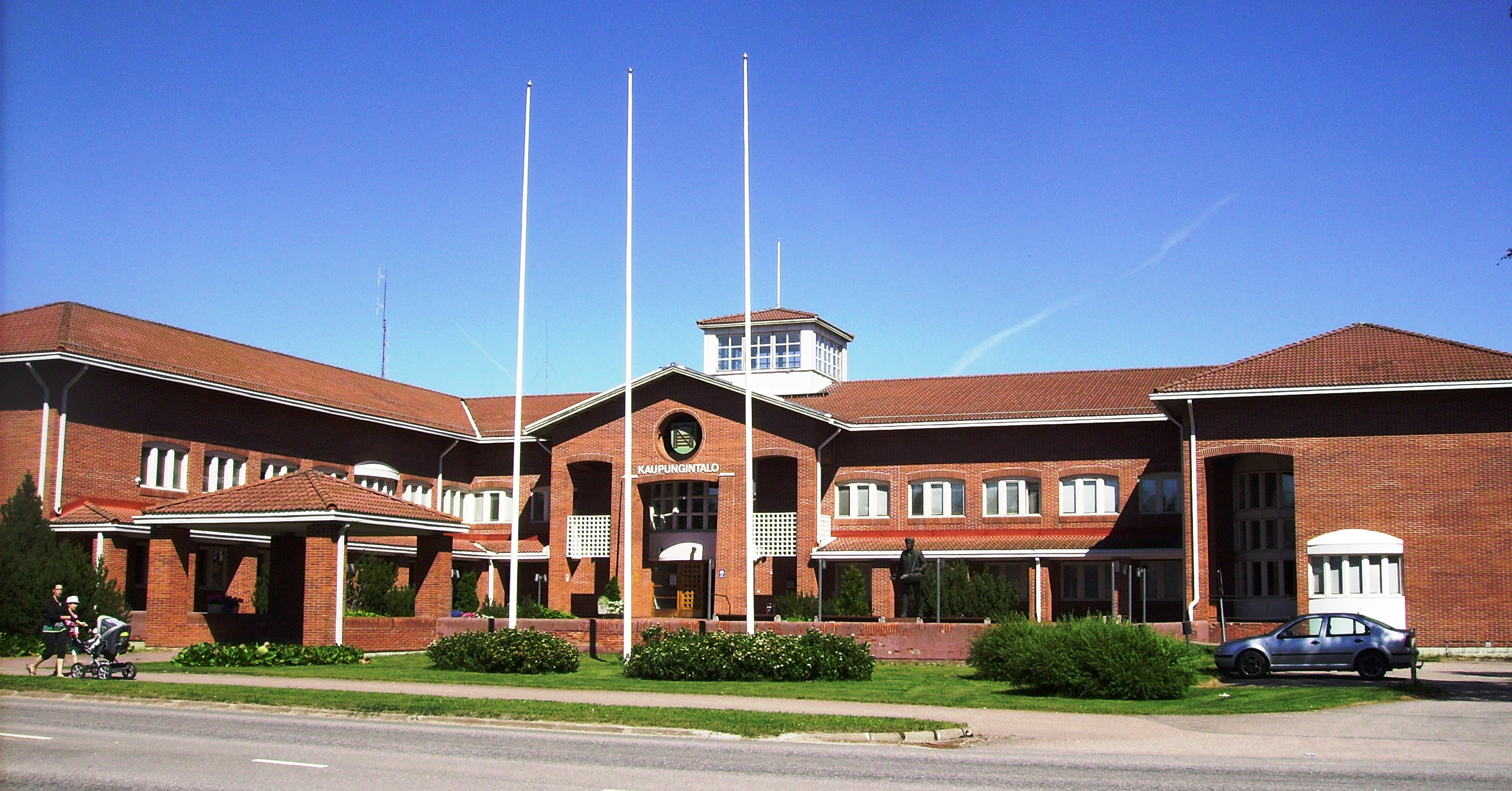

- Coat of arms
- Nickname: "Texas of Finland"
- Location of Nivala in Finland
- Interactive map of Nivala
- Coordinates: 63°55.5′N 024°58.5′E
- Country: Finland
- Region: North Ostrobothnia
- Sub-region: Nivala–Haapajärvi
- Charter: 1867
- Town privileges: 1992

Government
  - Town manager: Päivi Karikumpu

Area (2018-01-01)
  - Total: 536.88 km^{2} (207.29 sq mi)
  - Land: 527.31 km^{2} (203.60 sq mi)
  - Water: 8.92 km^{2} (3.44 sq mi)
  - Rank: 165th largest in Finland

Population (2025-12-31)
  - Total: 10,300
  - Rank: 92nd largest in Finland
  - Density: 19.53/km^{2} (50.6/sq mi)

Population by native language
  - Finnish: 98.1% (official)
  - Others: 1.9%

Population by age
  - 0 to 14: 22.5%
  - 15 to 64: 54.2%
  - 65 or older: 23.3%
- Time zone: UTC+02:00 (EET)
  - Summer (DST): UTC+03:00 (EEST)
- Website: www.nivala.fi

Nivala (formerly known as Pidisjärvi) is a town and municipality of Finland. It is located in the Northern Ostrobothnia region. The town has a population of 10,300 (31 December 2025) and covers an area of 536.88 square kilometres (207.29 sq mi) of which 8.92 km^{2} (3.44 sq mi) is water. The population density is 19.53 inhabitants per square kilometre (50.6/sq mi). The municipality is unilingually Finnish.

The subject of Nivala's coat of arms describes the wooden gate model typical of the municipality, and at the same time the shape of the gate resembles the initial letter of the name of the municipality. The coat of arms was designed by Kalervo Kallio, the son of president Kyösti Kallio, and the Nivala municipal council approved it at its meeting on 23 November 1964. The Ministry of the Interior approved the coat of arms for use on 4 February 1965.

Nivala and its surrounding area have often been called the "Texas of Finland", as it is one of the country's most significant milk and beef producers and its landscapes with flat fields and open spaces are said to resemble each other. Several Christian summer events have been organized in Nivala, such as the Awakening Festivals and summer services for Conservative Laestadios.

== Geography ==
Neighbouring municipalities are Haapajärvi, Haapavesi, Sievi, and Ylivieska.

=== Nature ===
The Kalajoki river flows through the municipality. The biggest lake in the region is Pidisjärvi and the two other lakes are Suojärvi and Erkkisjärvi.

=== Climate ===
Nivala has a subarctic climate (Köppen: Dfc).

Climate data for Nivala
Month	Jan	Feb	Mar	Apr	May	Jun	Jul	Aug	Sep	Oct	Nov	Dec	Year
Mean daily maximum °C (°F)	−5.6 (21.9)	−4.4 (24.1)	0.4 (32.7)	7.1 (44.8)	14.0 (57.2)	18.5 (65.3)	21.1 (70.0)	19.1 (66.4)	13.4 (56.1)	5.9 (42.6)	0.6 (33.1)	−3.1 (26.4)	7.3 (45.1)
Daily mean °C (°F)	−8.1 (17.4)	−7.4 (18.7)	−3.6 (25.5)	2.8 (37.0)	9.4 (48.9)	14.2 (57.6)	16.8 (62.2)	14.7 (58.5)	9.5 (49.1)	3.4 (38.1)	−1.2 (29.8)	−5.2 (22.6)	3.8 (38.8)
Mean daily minimum °C (°F)	−10.9 (12.4)	−10.7 (12.7)	−7.8 (18.0)	−1.7 (28.9)	3.9 (39.0)	8.7 (47.7)	11.7 (53.1)	9.9 (49.8)	5.6 (42.1)	0.8 (33.4)	−3.2 (26.2)	−7.5 (18.5)	−0.1 (31.8)
Average precipitation mm (inches)	39.7 (1.56)	35.3 (1.39)	30.0 (1.18)	36.6 (1.44)	57.7 (2.27)	71.8 (2.83)	87.9 (3.46)	84.1 (3.31)	61.8 (2.43)	58.3 (2.30)	50.8 (2.00)	48.6 (1.91)	662.6 (26.08)
Source: Weather.Directory

== Notable people ==
- Kyösti Kallio, the fourth President of Finland (1937–1940), was a resident of Nivala.
- Rakel Liehu, writer
- Maria Lohela, former Speaker of the Parliament of Finland (2015–2018)
- Atte Ohtamaa, hockey player
