= Summer services =

Annual Christian festival in Finland

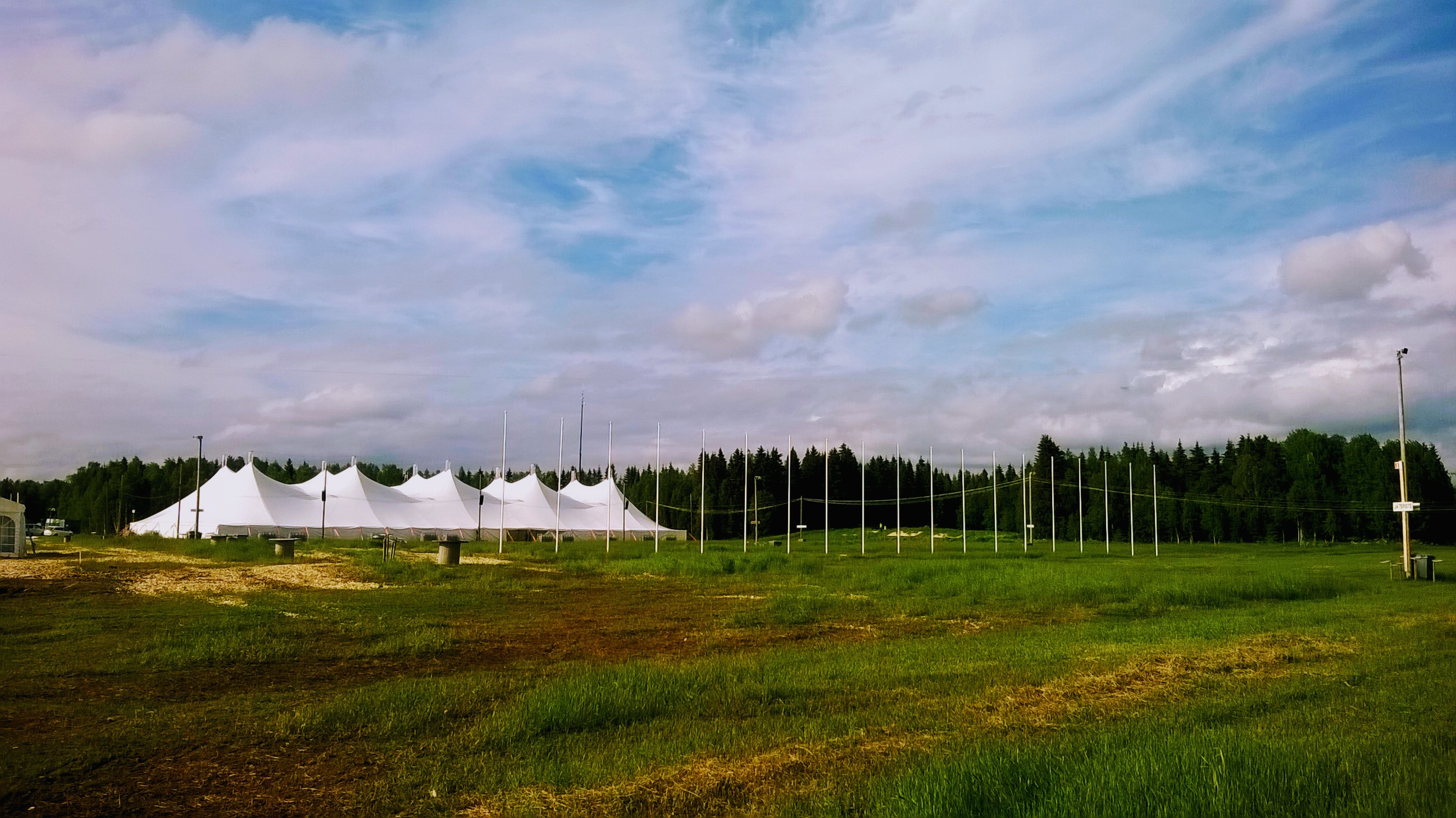
- The "Big Tent" has served as the main venue for services since 2009
- Date: End of June
- Location: Changes every year
- Type: Christian congress
- Organised by: Suomen rauhanyhdistysten keskusyhdistys
- Website: http://suviseurat.fi/

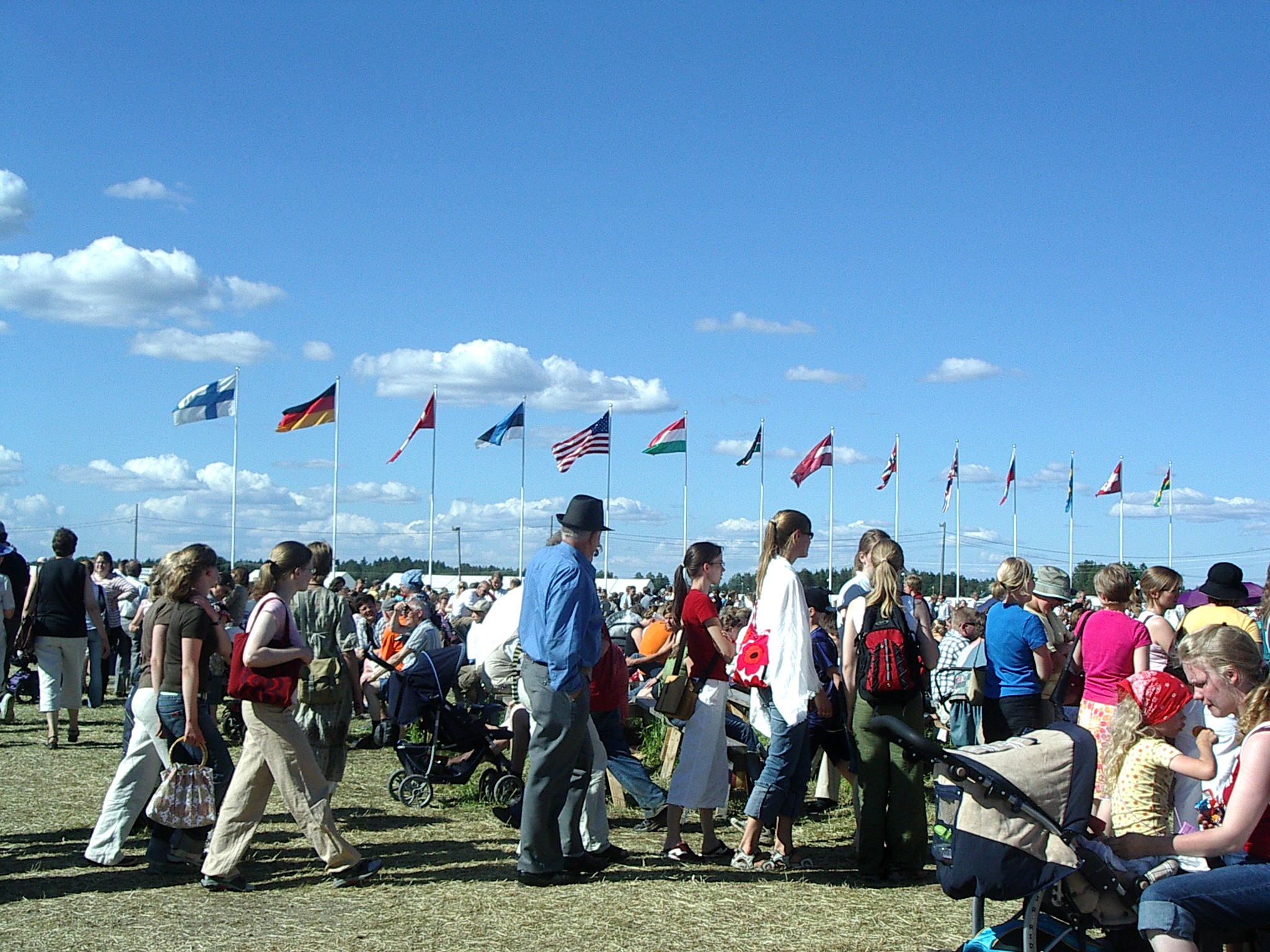
Summer services in Perho, Finland in 2005

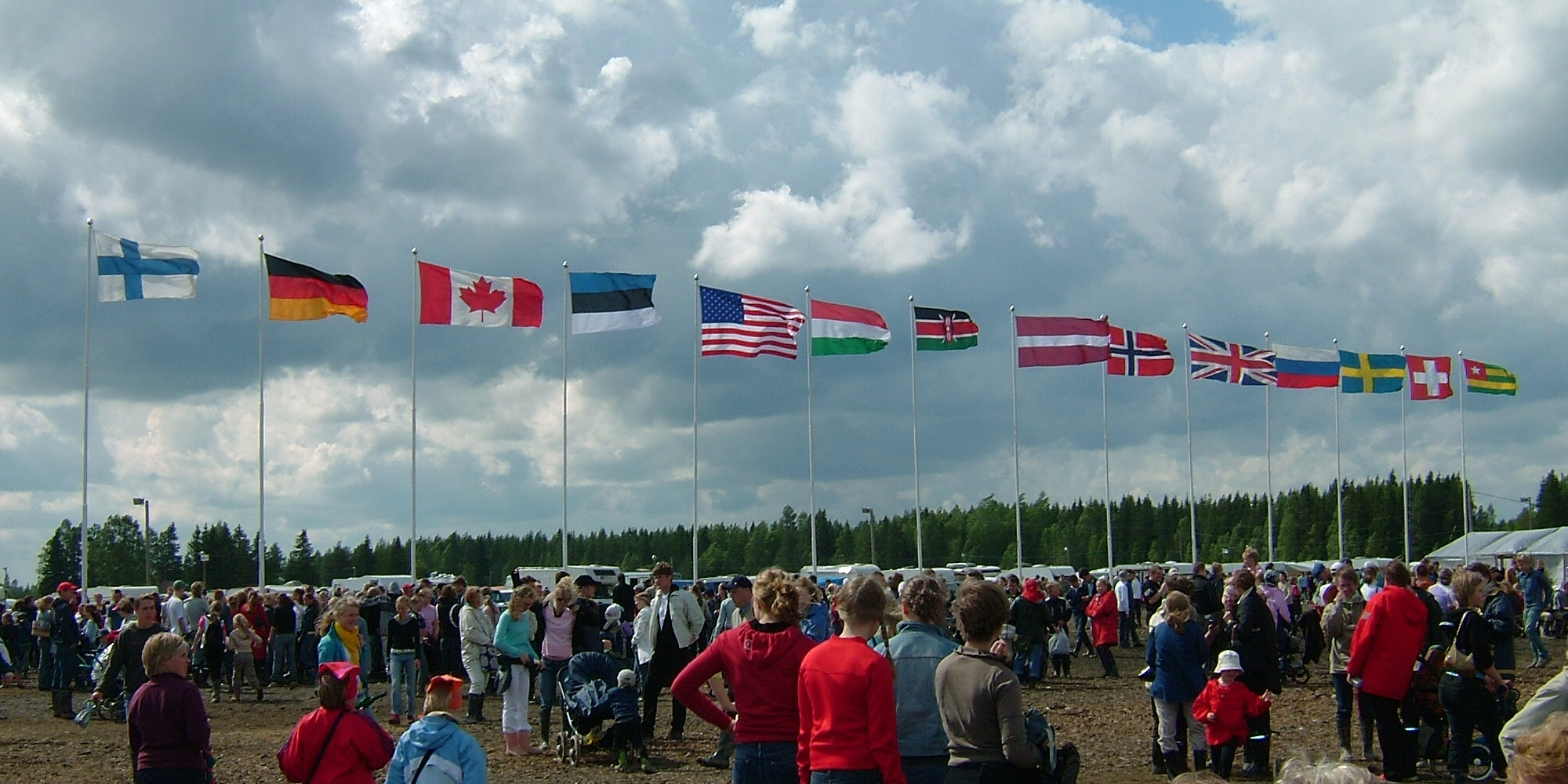
Flags represent countries where SRK (the central organization of Conservative Laestadians in Finland) or its sister organizations are regularly active

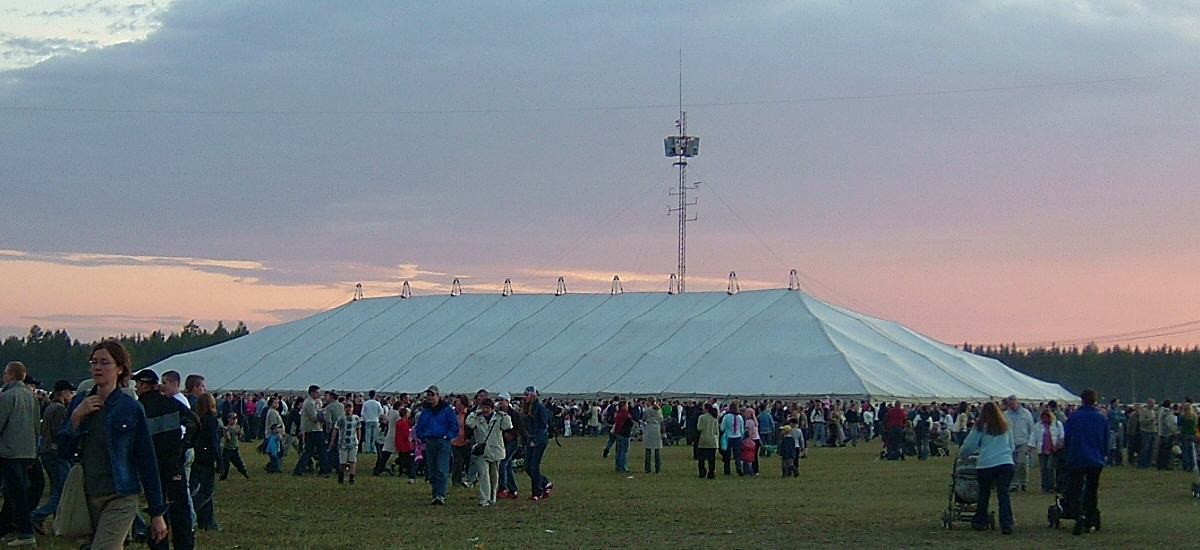
The main tent for the services used between 1960–2008

Summer services (Finnish: suviseurat, Swedish: sommarmötet, Russian: Большое Летнее Собрание) is the annual meeting of the Finnish Lutheran movement known as Conservative Laestadians. In addition to the primary Finnish gathering, similar meetings are arranged in North America, Sweden and Russia.

== Suviseurat in Finland ==
Summer services (Finnish: Suviseurat) is a large gathering of Laestadians in Finland. The event occurs every year at the end of June. It is organized and hosted by a Finnish Conservative Laestadianism association known as the Suomen rauhanyhdistysten keskusyhdistys (SRK). Summer services are among the most visited Finnish summer festivals and the largest spiritual meeting. Summer services are attended by tens of thousands of visitors from Finland, Russia, Estonia, Sweden, Norway, United States, Canada and many other countries. The number of visitors reaches its peak usually on Saturday night, when the services have 80,000 simultaneous visitors.

Summer services take place over the course of four days, usually a Friday through Monday. The program consist mainly of sermons and hymns and songs of Zion. The Summer services areas is about 100 hectares (270 acres). The size of the event requires the need for loudspeakers to carry sermons to all of the listeners. On Saturday Holy Communion is offered and in the evening there is a presentation which is mainly for younger listeners. A gathering for pastors is also held during the Summer services.

The Summer Services take place in a different location every year. 2020 summer services in Reisjärvi will be 112th in order. Services were held in for the first time in 1906 with Oulu being the host city.

Recently, sermons have been broadcast via the Internet into many languages.

=== Host cities in Finland ===
1906; Oulu	1907; Oulu	1908; Ylivieska	1909; Tornio-Haaparanta	1910; Helsinki	1911; Kokkola	1912; Rovaniemi	1913; Kajaani	1914; Oulainen	1915 —†	1916; Oulu	1917; Ii	1918; Jyväskylä	1919; Kemi
1920; Vaasa	1921; Ylivieska	1922; Viipuri	1923; Kajaani	1924; Oulu	1925; Rovaniemi	1926; Haapajärvi	1927; Jyväskylä	1928; Oulu	1929; Tornio	1930; Kajaani	1931; Rovaniemi	1932; Iisalmi	1933; Oulu
1934; Oulu	1935; Oulu	1936; Rovaniemi	1937; Jyväskylä	1938; Kajaani	1939; Kemi	1940; Oulu	1941 —††	1942; Oulu	1943; Haapajärvi	1944 —†††	1945; Nivala	1946; Pori	1947; Joensuu
1948; Kuopio	1949; Haapajärvi	1950; Ylivieska	1951; Rovaniemi	1952; Tornio	1953; Iisalmi	1954; Tampere	1955; Kemi	1956; Oulu	1957; Kuopio	1958; Jyväskylä	1959; Helsinki	1960; Kajaani	1961; Kuusamo
1962; Raahe	1963; Ylivieska	1964; Joensuu	1965; Rovaniemi	1966; Oulu	1967; Jämsä	1968; Reisjärvi	1969; Nivala	1970; Alajärvi	1971; Ruukki	1972; Pudasjärvi	1973; Ranua	1974; Hollola	1975; Turku
1976; Sievi	1977; Haapajärvi	1978; Kajaani	1979; Rovaniemi	1980; Keminmaa	1981; Perho	1982; Oulunsalo	1983; Kalajoki	1984; Hollola	1985; Kuusamo	1986; Outokumpu	1987; Hankasalmi	1988; Vihti	1989; Ranua
1990; Haapavesi	1991; Jämijärvi	1992; Iisalmi	1993; Haukipudas	1994; Tornio	1995; Toholampi	1996; Alajärvi	1997; Rovaniemi	1998; Pudasjärvi	1999; Kronoby	2000; Petäjävesi	2001; Ruukki	2002; Maaninka	2003; Muhos
2004; Nivala	2005; Perho	2006; Sotkamo	2007; Valkeala	2008; Sievi	2009; Oripää	2010; Liperi	2011; Lumijoki	2012; Loppi	2013; Pudasjärvi	2014; Pyhäjoki	2015; Vaasa	2016; Tornio	2017; Pori
2018; Äänekoski	2019; Muhos	2020; Reisjärvi/radio	2021; Reisjärvi	2022; Loppi	2023; Kauhava	2024; Pudasjärvi	2025; Loppi						

- (†) 1915 summer services in Alakainuu, Sweden were cancelled due to typhoid fever epidemic.
- (††) 1941 summer services in Haapajärvi were cancelled due to Continuation War.
- (†††) 1944 summer services in Nivala were officially cancelled due to Continuation War. Nevertheless, the cancellation message did not reach everyone and thousands of guests and speakers arrived. Services were held unofficially.
- Due to the Covid-19 pandemic, the 2020 summer services in Reisjärvi were conducted solely via radio broadcast and were accessible online.

== Summer services in North America ==
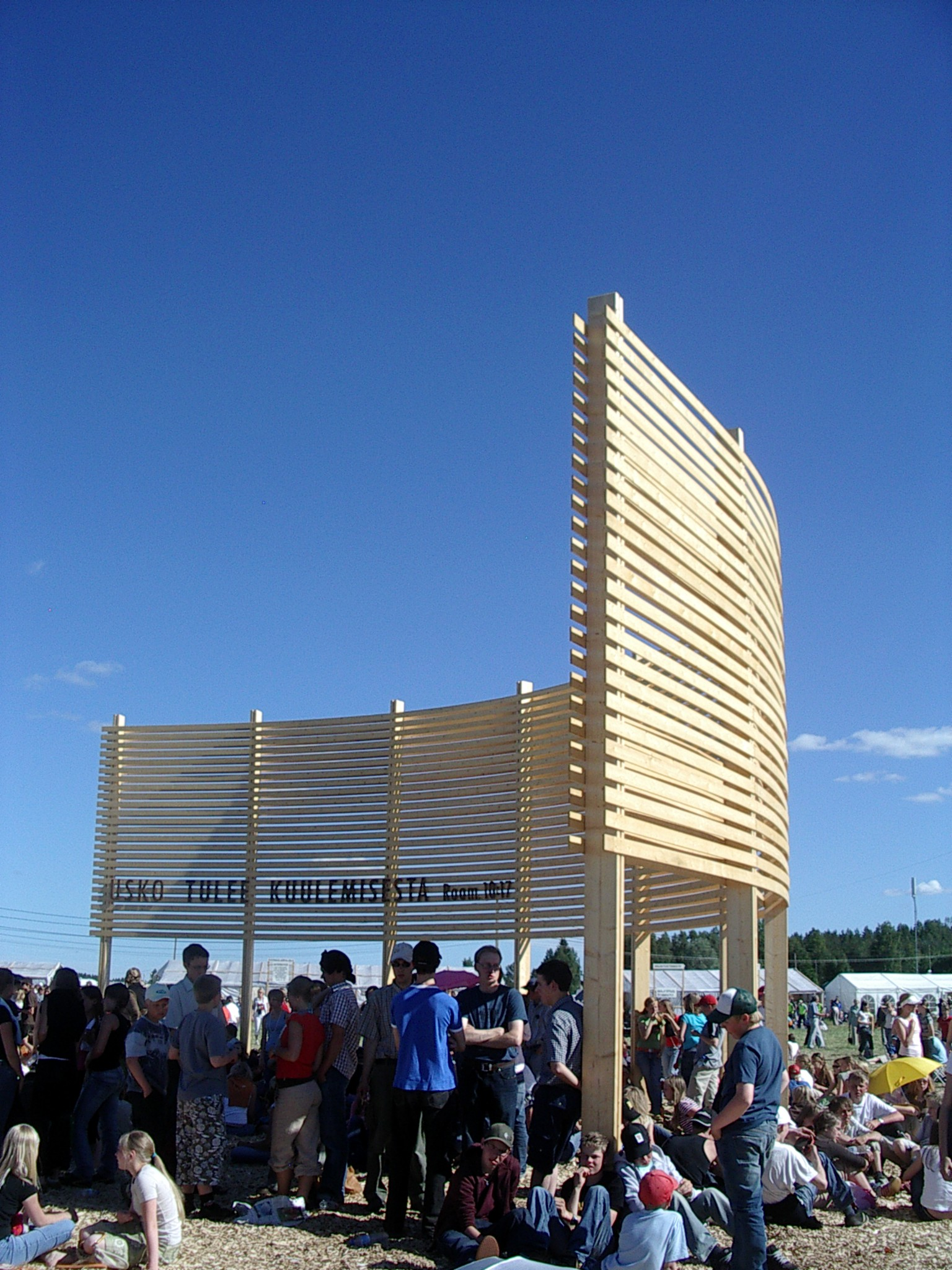
Festival gate of Perho summer services in 2005

Summer services in North America are arranged by members of the Laestadian Lutheran Church.

They take place every year during the first weekend of July. They are mostly attended by North American guests, but some guests come from Finland, Ecuador, Togo, and elsewhere.

The service schedule consists of devotional speeches and Songs and Hymns of Zion. The purpose of the services is to invite all people to hear the Word of God. The core of the proclamation is the message of Jesus as the redeemer of sins and the call to repentance.

2013 - Deer Park, Washington hosted by Spokane Laestadian Lutheran Church

2014 - Rogers, Minnesota hosted by Rockford Laestadian Lutheran Church

2015 - Outlook, Saskatchewan hosted by Outlook Laestadian Lutheran Church

2016 - Essa Township, Ontario hosted by Toronto Laestadian Lutheran Church

2017 - Howard Lake, Minnesota hosted by Cokato Laestadian Lutheran Church

2018 - Snohomish, Washington hosted by Seattle Laestadian Lutheran Church

2019 - Monticello, Minnesota hosted by Rockford Laestadian Lutheran Church

2020 - Loretto, Minnesota hosted by Laestadian Lutheran Church

2021 - Monticello, Minnesota hosted by Laestadian Lutheran Church

2022 - Kelso, Washington hosted by Longview Laestadian Lutheran Church

2023 - Monticello, Minnesota hosted by Monticello Laestadian Lutheran Church

2024 - Monticello, Minnesota hosted by Northern Minnesota Congregations
