= Central Association of the Finnish Associations of Peace =

Finnish Christian organization

- Suomen Rauhanyhdistysten Keskusyhdistys
- Abbreviation: SRK
- Formation: 1906; 120 years ago
- Type: NGO
- Purpose: Christian revival movement
- Headquarters: Kiviharjunlenkki 7, 90220 Oulu, Finland
- Secretary General: Arto Tölli
- Chairperson: Valde Palola
- Publication: Päivämies

The Central Association of the Finnish Associations of Peace (Finnish: Suomen Rauhanyhdistysten Keskusyhdistys ry, SRK) is a Conservative Laestadian organization in Finland. It is part of Conservative Laestadianism and its sister organization in North America is Laestadian Lutheran Church. SRK has 179 Associations of Peace in Finland and eight in Russia. It has also sister organizations in Sweden and Estonia. It does mission work in 18 countries.

== SRK's services in English-speaking countries ==
- Great Britain
  - London:
    - Church of England Holy Trinity, 3 Bryan Road, Rotherhithe, London, SE16 5 HF.

== See also ==
- Laestadianism
- Laestadianism in America
- Association of Peace
- SFC, Sveriges fridsföreningarnas centralorganisation
- Laestadian Lutherans India (లాస్టేడియన్ లూథరన్స్, லேஸ்டேடியன் லூதரன், लेस्टैडियन लूथरन, ଲାଏଷ୍ଟାଡିଆନ୍ ଲୁଥେରାନ୍, ലെസ്റ്റാഡിയൻ ലൂഥറൻ, लेस्टेडियन लुथेरन)
- Estonian Lutheran Association of Peace
