= Johann Michael Hahn =

German Pietist, Theosophist and the founder of the Hahn'schen Gemeinschaft

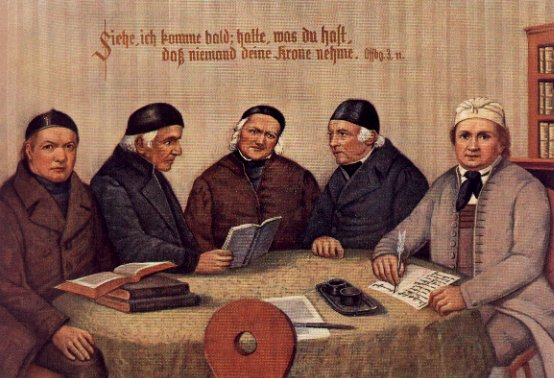
The 'Five Brothers Painting', a group portrait of the personalities of Württemberg Pietism – left to right, Johannes Schnaitmann, Anton Egeler, Johann Martin Schäffer, Immanuel Gottlieb Kolb, Johann Michael Hahn.

Michael Hahn (2 February 1758 – 20 January 1819) was a German Pietist, Theosophist and the founder of the Hahn'schen Gemeinschaft. His alleged forename Johann does not appear on his birth certificate.

== Life ==
He was born into a peasant family on 2 February 1758, at Altdorf near Stuttgart. At the age of seventeen he claimed to have had a vision lasting for three hours. From that time on he attended Pietist meetings, despite his father's opposition which drove him from his home. He became a preacher, living on the estate of Duchess Frances at Sindlingen near Herrenberg in Württemberg, where he died on 20 January 1819.

== Works ==
- Johann Michael Hahns Schriften. 15 Bände. Originalausgaben Fues, Tübingen (ab 1819), Nachauflagen M. Hahn'sche Gemeinschaft, Stuttgart (ab 1932).
  - Volume 1: Lieder über die Berg-Predigt Jesu, ... 1819.
  - Volume 2: Briefe über die Apostel-Geschichte, ... 1820.
  - Volume 3: Briefe und Lieder über die zweyte Epistel Pauli an die Corinther, ... 1820.
  - Volume 4: Briefe und Lieder über die Briefe Pauli an den Timotheus, ... 1820.
  - Volume 5: Briefe und Lieder über die heilige Offenbarung Jesu Christi, ... 2. Auflage. 1846.
  - Volume 6,1: Psalm 1 bis 66, ... 3. Auflage. 1853.
  - Volume 6,2: Psalm 67 bis Ende. 3. Auflage. 1853.
  - Volume 7: Betrachtungen auf alle Tage des Jahrs über den Brief Pauli an die Römer, ... 1849.
  - Volume 8: Betrachtungen auf alle Tage des Jahrs über einzelne biblische Texte, ... 1825.
  - Volume 9: Betrachtungen, Gebete und Lieder auf die Sonn-, Fest- und Feyertage, ... 1826.
  - Volume 10: Sammlung von auserlesenen geistlichen Gesängen zur Belehrung, ... 1827.
  - Volume 11: Send-Briefe über einzelne Kapitel aus dem alten Testament und den vier Evangelisten, ... 1855.
  - Volume 12: Send-Briefe über einzelne Capitel aus dem alten und neuen Testament und Antworten auf Fragen über Herzenserfahrungen, ... 1830.
  - Volume 13: Sendschreiben und Lieder an Freunde der Wahrheit als Antworten auf ihre Fragen. 1841.
  - Volume 14: Briefe von der ersten Offenbarung Gottes durch die ganze Schöpfung bis an das Ziel aller Dinge, ... 1825.
  - Volume 15: Sammlung auserlesener geistlicher Gesänge, ... 5. Auflage. 1891.

== Bibliography ==
- (in German) W. F. Stroh: Die Lehre des württembergischen Theosophen Johann Michael Hahn, systematisch entwickelt. Steinkopf, Stuttgart 1859. 4. Auflage 1965, ISBN 3-7984-0102-0.
- (in German) Joseph Hahn: Bekanntes und Unbekanntes aus dem Leben des württembergischen Theosophen Johann Michael Hahn. Rohm, Lorch 1919. Neuauflage: Turm, Bietigheim 1983(?), ISBN 3-7999-0210-4.
- (in German) Weisheit im Staube – Ein Lesebuch der Schwabenväter Bengel, Oetinger, Fricker, Philipp Matthäus Hahn, Michael Hahn. Wunderlich, Tübingen, 1927.
- (in German) Johann Michael Hahn. Kurze Darstellung seines Lebens und seiner Lehre. M. Hahn'sche Gemeinschaft, Stuttgart, 1939. 3. Auflage 1961.
- (in German) Gottlob Lang: Michael Hahn. Ein Gottesmann im schwäbischen Bauerngewand. Lebensbild und Auswahl. Calwer, Stuttgart, 1962.
- (in German) Joachim Trautwein: Die Theosophie Michael Hahns und ihre Quellen. Calwer, Stuttgart 1969.
- (in German) Friedhelm Groth: Die "Wiederbringung aller Dinge" im Württembergischen Pietismus. Theologiegeschichtliche Studien zum eschatologischen Heilsuniversalismus württembergischer Pietisten des 18. Jahrhunderts. Arbeiten zur Geschichte des Pietismus, Band 21. Vandenhoeck und Ruprecht, Göttingen 1984, ISBN 3-525-55805-8.
- (in German) Werner Raupp: „Wie Gott, was Gott und wo Gott sey?“ Michael Hahn, der gnostische Gottessucher aus Altdorf, in: Schwäbische Heimat. Zeitschrift für Regionalgeschichte, württembergische Landeskultur, Naturschutz und Denkmalpflege 59 (2008), No. 2, p. 142-148 (on the occasion of J. M. Hahn's 150. birthday).
