= Laestadian Lutheran Church =

Religious Christian movement

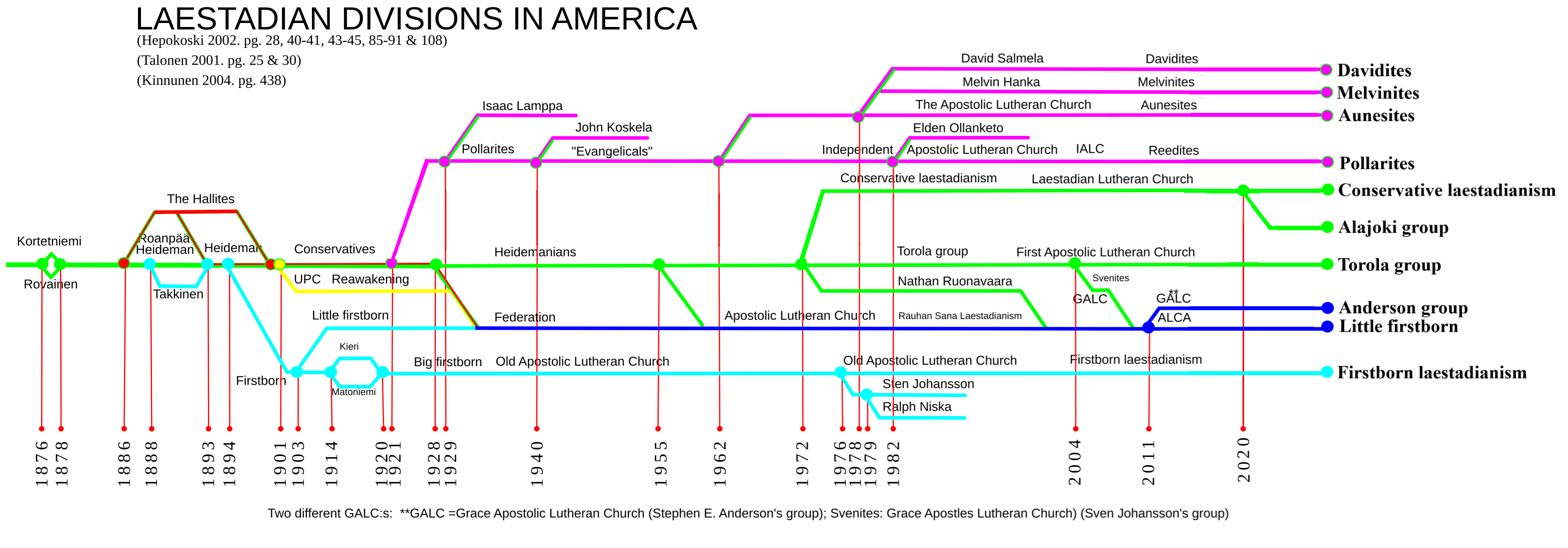
Family tree of laestadianism in America. Includes defunct groups.

The Laestadian Lutheran Church (LLC) is a religious Christian movement, with teachings based on the Bible and the Lutheran Confessions. When it was reorganized, from the Heidemanians, on June 9, 1973, the organisation was named the Association of American Laestadian Congregations (AALC). The association then changed its name in 1994 in order to better convey its spiritual heritage. As of 2025, the Laestadian Lutheran Church has 30 member congregations in the United States and Canada, with the highest concentrations of members in Minnesota, Washington, Arizona, Michigan in the United States and in Saskatchewan, Canada; the congregations are served by about 90 ministers, nearly all of them lay preachers.

In Northern Europe, the association's sister organizations are the Conservative Laestadians' Central Association of the Finnish Associations of Peace (Suomen rauhanyhdistysten keskusyhdistys) in Finland, the Sveriges fridsföreningarnas centralorganisation in Sweden, and the Estonian Lutheran Association of Peace (Eesti Luterlik Rahuühendus).

The main teaching among them is of Jesus' suffering, death, and resurrection. The work of Jesus Christ continues in this world by the Holy Spirit, through whom Luthern Laestadians preach forgiveness. Laestadians believe both lay congregants or pastors can preach forgiveness, often uttering "All sins are forgiven in Jesus name and precious/holy blood." The Laestadian Lutheran Church teaches of God's kingdom and the need for repentance and the forgiveness of sins. The church holds, in accord with the Lutheran Confessions, that the Bible is the highest guide and authority for Christian faith, doctrine, and life. The norms in the congregation such as refraining from birth control, makeup, and dancing, are some of the things members do not feel are right to do as a child of God.

The Laestadian Lutheran Church takes its name from Martin Luther and Lars Levi Laestadius. Laestadius was a Lutheran pastor who served in northern Sweden from 1825 to 1861. The movement reached North America with Finnish immigrants in the 1860s. Congregations were first formally organized in Cokato, Minnesota, in 1872 and Calumet, Michigan, in 1873. The Laestadian movement in North America has suffered a number of schisms since 1890. The subjects of disagreement have mainly been the understanding of justification, God's congregation, and the sacraments. The last division occurred in 1973 and resulted in the establishment of the Laestadian Lutheran Church, and the First Apostolic Lutheran Church.

== Newsletters and testimonials ==
Luthern Laestadians have two main forms of publishing articles and testimonies within their church. A website, Kingdom of Peace, and a newsletter called the Voice of Zion. Testimonials are often written by new believers and existing believers who are living away from the community.

Kingdom of Peace is a website that has testimonials of new believers, archived sermons from churches around the US, articles, and a mission statement. In 2025, articles have been published around 3-4 times a month, an increased amount from previous year.

Voice of Zion has monthly issues in paper format and features prominent articles on their website.

== See also ==
- Conservative Laestadianism
- Laestadianism
- Laestadianism in America
- Summer services
