= Conservative Laestadianism =

Branch of the Lutheran revival movement

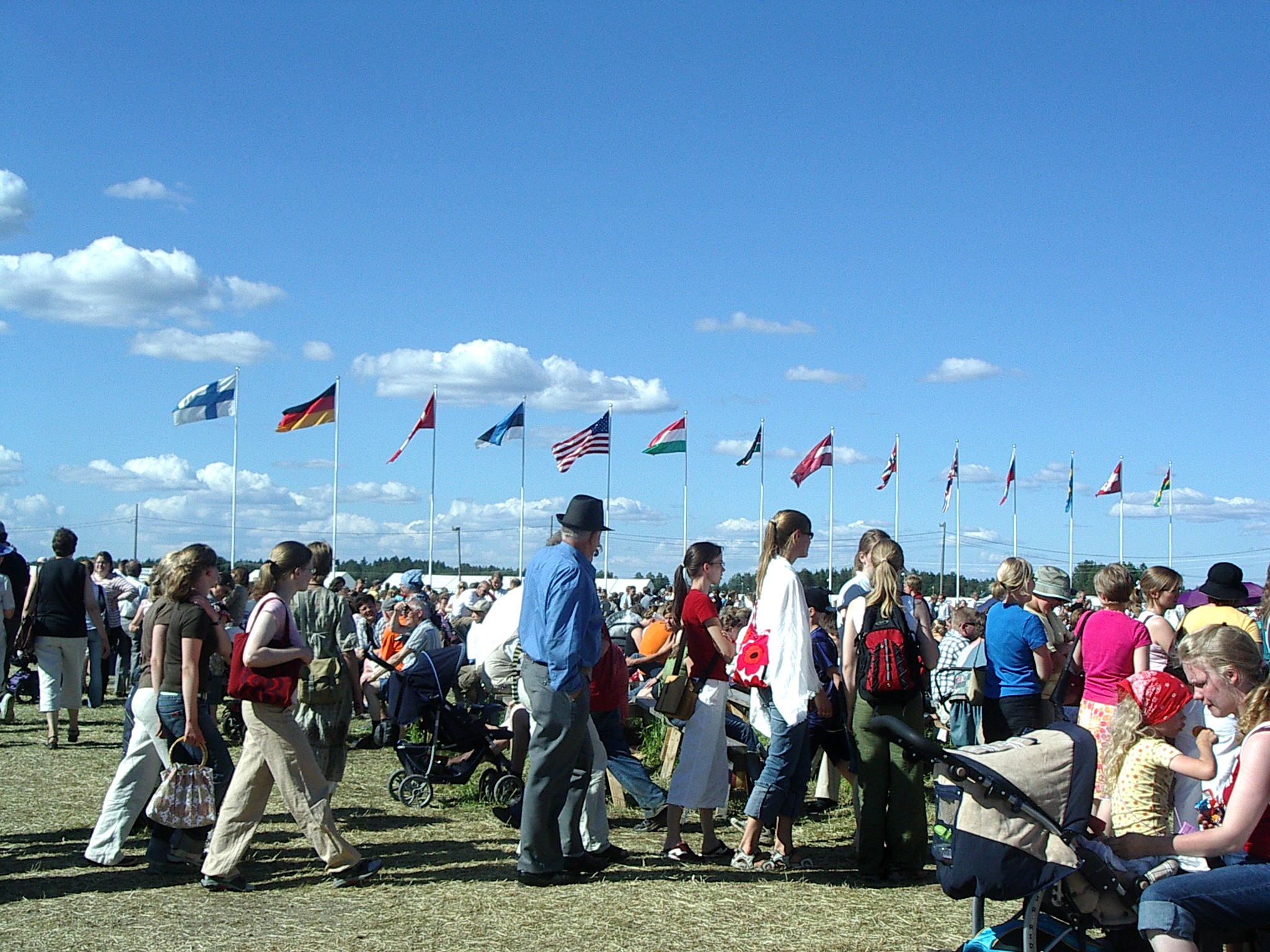
Summer services at Perho, Finland in 2005

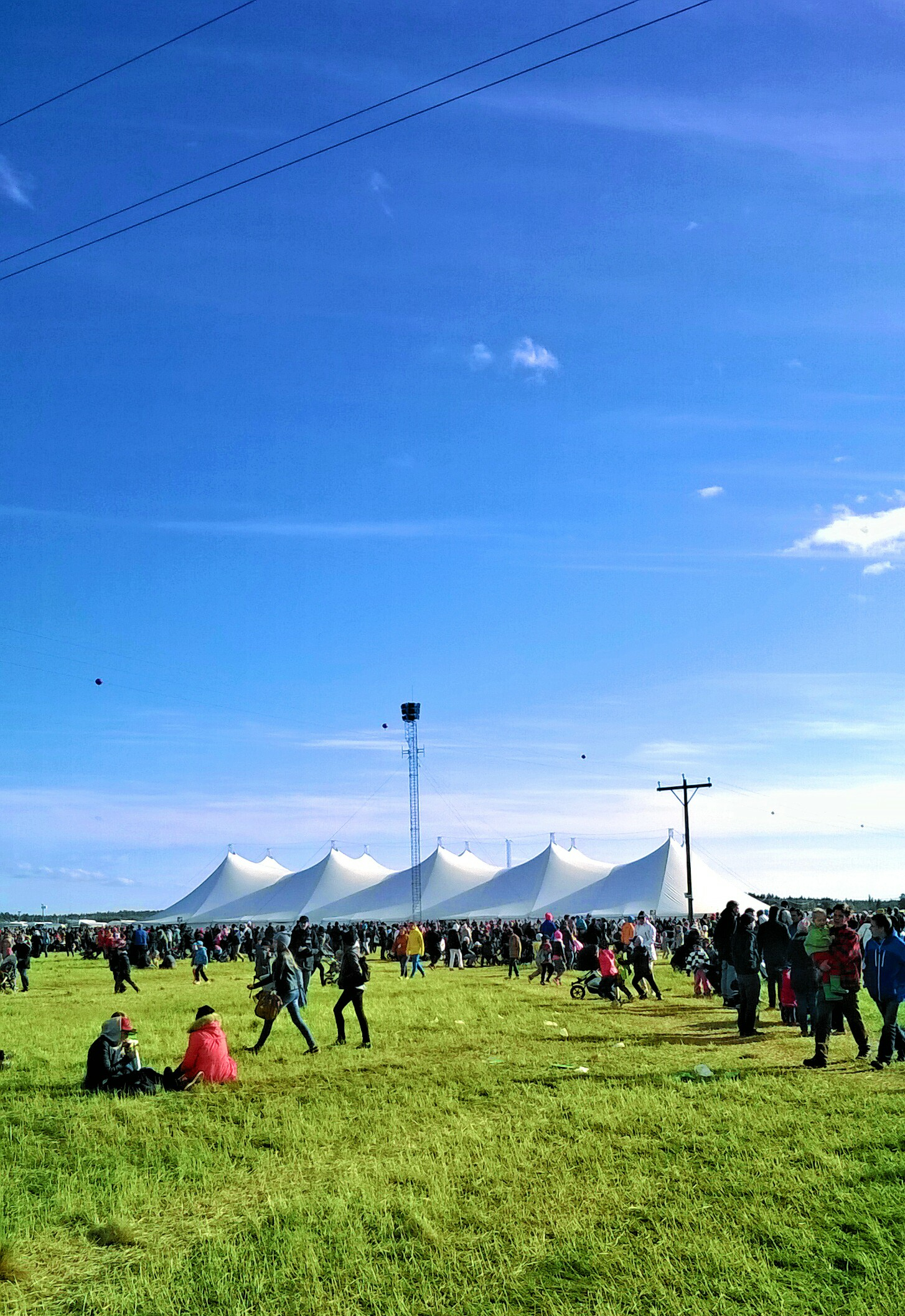

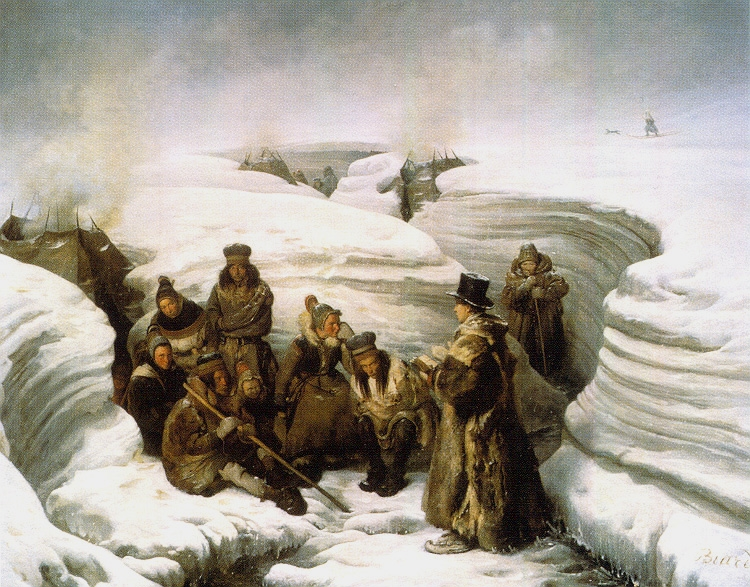
Laestadius preaching in Lapland.

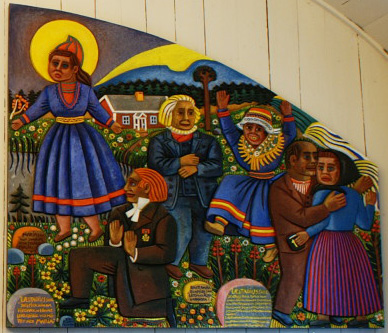
In the right altar piece in Jukkasjärvi church, Laestadius kneeling before Sami woman Maria, who served as his teacher.

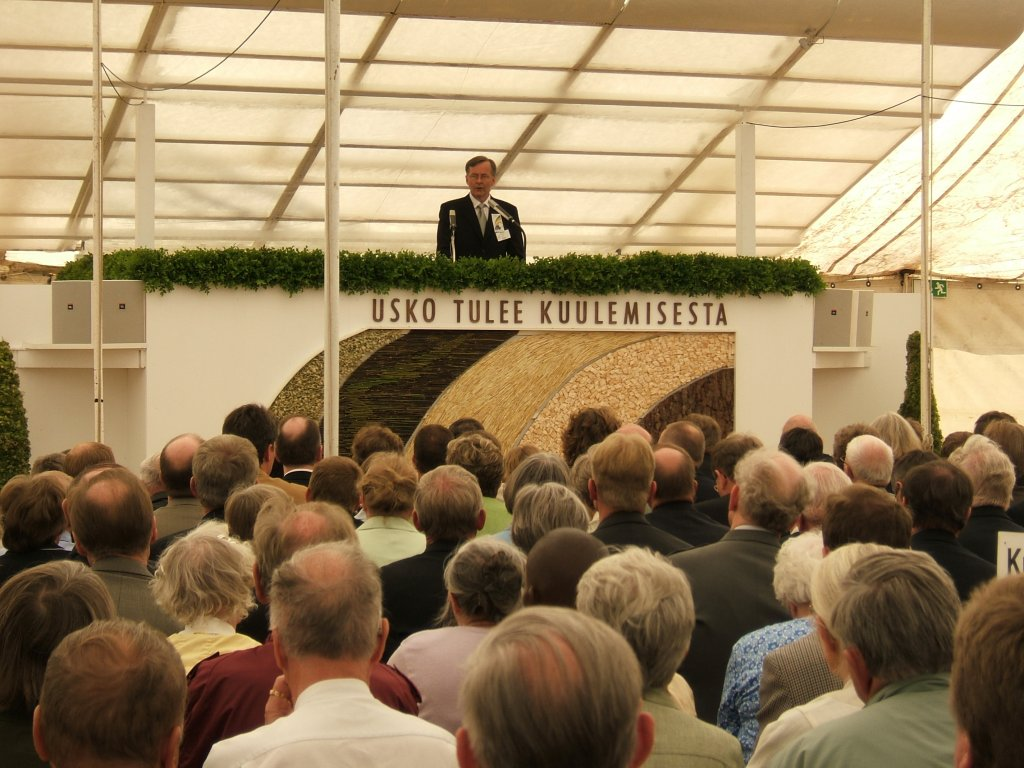
A speaker and older listeners at Summer Services in Perho, Finland 2005

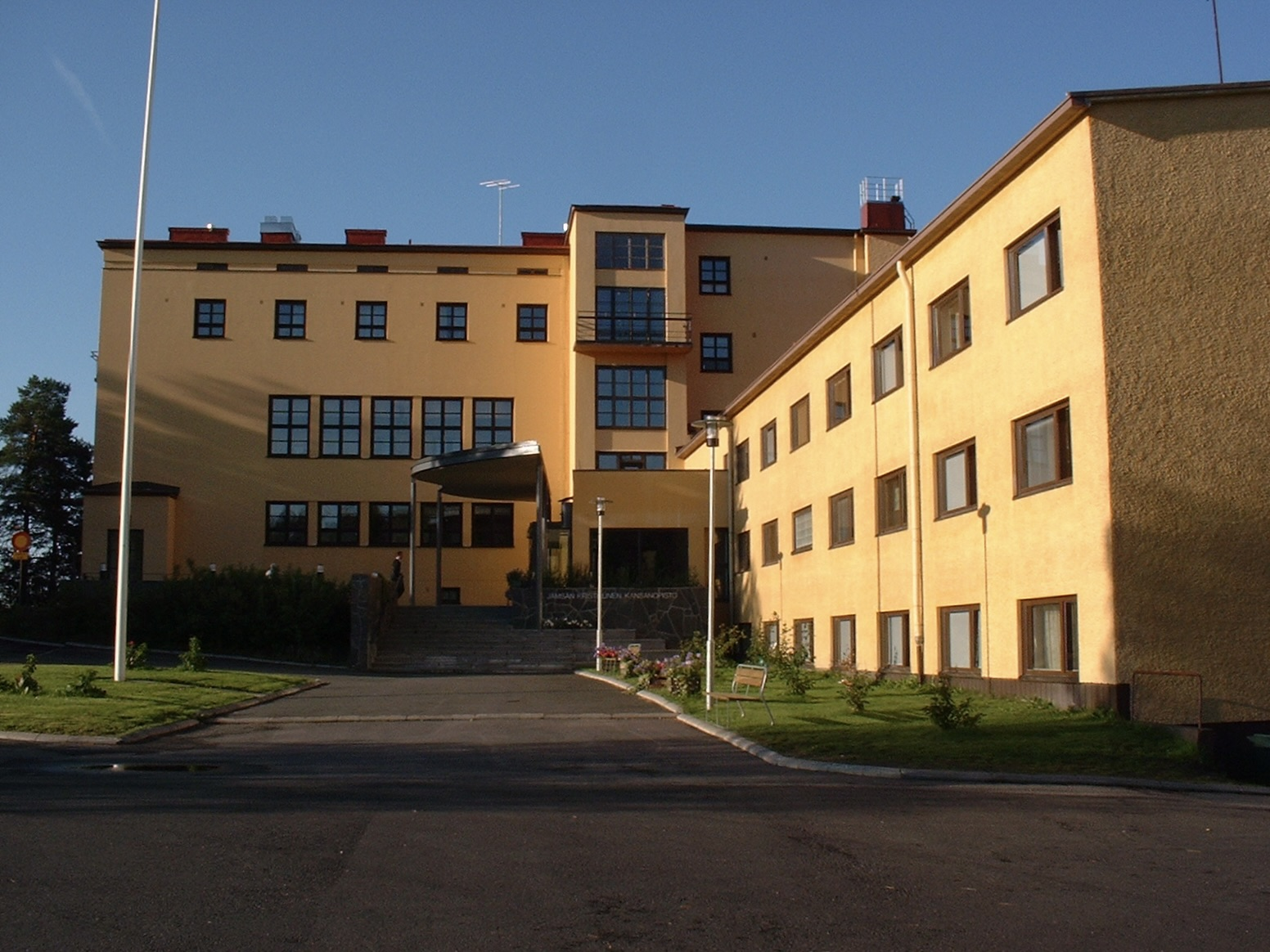
The Christian Folk High School of Jämsä belongs to the conservative Laestadian movement in Finland.

Conservative Laestadianism is the largest branch of the Lutheran revival movement Laestadianism. It has spread to 16 countries. As of 2012 there were about 115,000 Conservative Laestadians, most of them in Finland, the United States, Norway, and Sweden. The movement and this denomination attribute their teachings to the Bible and the Lutheran Book of Concord.

== History ==
Laestadianism received its name from Pastor Lars Levi Laestadius. The origin of the denomination's name from the Finnish word for 'conservative' (vanhoillis-) is unknown. In North and South America as well as in Africa this denomination is known as the Laestadian Lutheran Movement.

The movement began in Swedish Lapland. Laestadius met a Sami woman named Milla Clementsdotter of Föllinge, during an 1844 inspection tour of Åsele. Clementsdotter recited various biblical teachings to Laestadius. This was an important meeting for Laestadius because afterwards he felt he understood the secret of living faith. He believed that he received the forgiveness for his sins and saw the way that led to the eternal life. His sermons underwent a marked transformation, and the movement began to spread from Sweden to Finland and Norway.

=== Divisions ===
At the beginning of the 20th century, Laestadianism broke into three branches: The Firstborn Laestadianism, Reawakening, and Conservative Laestadianism. After this major schism, several other groups have also departed from Conservative Laestadianism. It nevertheless remains the largest branch of Laestadianism.

==== Dissociation and exclusivity ====
Conservative Laestadianism's leadership firmly adheres to the teaching that all other Christian groups, including other Laestadian sub-groups, even those doctrinally identical to Conservative Laestadians, are heretical and have no place in the Kingdom of Heaven.

== Doctrine ==
The central teaching of Conservative Laestadianism, like the movement as a whole, is the declaration of forgiveness of sins whereby members proclaim to one another, "You can believe all sins forgiven in Jesus' name and precious blood," or similar words. Upon receiving this rite, a believer is said to receive the Holy Spirit allowing him or her to be saved from eternal damnation on the basis that God forgets all sins when they have been forgiven. This rite is also called the power of the "keys of the kingdom."

Conservative Laestadians believe that God has given the gift of faith to every child born in the world, although in their world view only Conservative Laestadians actually accept the gift.

Conservative Laestadians often have large families due to their belief that contraception is a sin. They believe that God is the lord of birth and death. They do not have a television at home because of the showing of what is viewed as offensive and sinful programing. They do not drink alcohol or listen to pop music. Recently, however, the Internet is blurring the line between television and no television as many watch television programming on the Internet.

Conservative Laestadians have about 780 preachers and 120 priests. LLC has about 68 preachers. All preachers among Conservative Laestadianism are men.

== Distribution ==
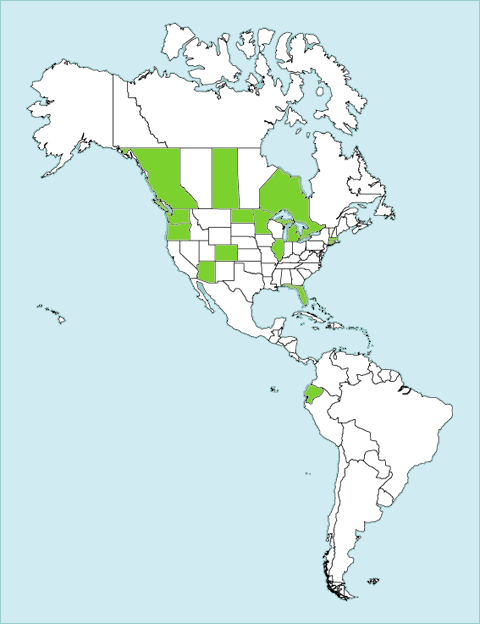
Conservative Laestadianism in the Americas

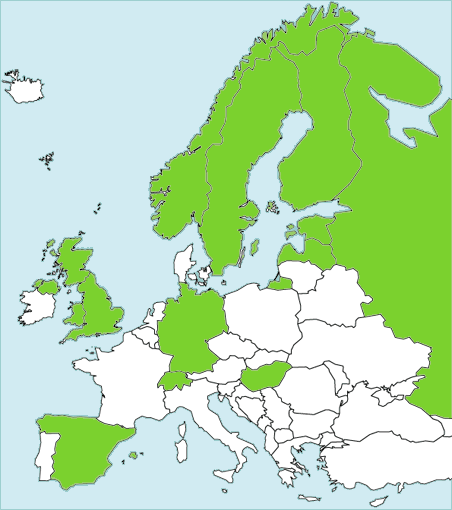
Conservative Laestadianism in Europe

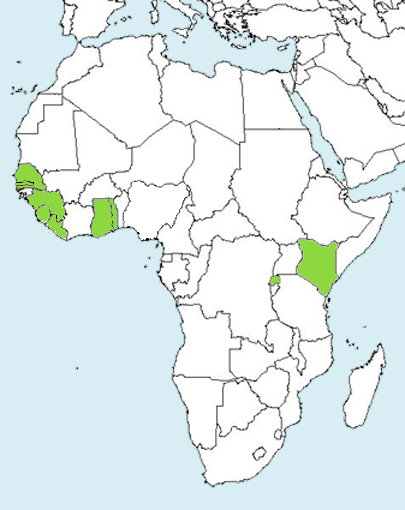
Conservative Laestadianism in Africa

Conservative Laestadianism is located mainly in northern Europe and North America. Small congregations can be found in Africa, southern Europe and South America. There are about 115,000 Conservative Laestadians, most of them in Finland, the United States and Sweden. Most (80,000-150,000) are in Finland. Conservative Laestadians organize big summer services every year. It is the biggest religious event in Nordic countries. About 70,000 guests come from all over the world. Conservative Laestadianism does mission work in 16 countries: Ecuador, Estonia, Finland, Germany, Great Britain, Hungary, Canada, Kenya, Latvia, Norway, Russia, Spain, Sweden, Switzerland, Togo and the United States.

Congregations in North America are located in the following provinces and states:

Canada: Alberta, British Columbia, Ontario and Saskatchewan.

United States: Alaska, Arizona, California, Colorado, Connecticut, Florida, Illinois, Michigan, Minnesota, Montana, North Dakota, Oregon, Washington, and Wyoming.

== Child sex abuse scandal ==
In 2011, the Finnish news media reported widespread child sexual abuse and coverup within Finnish Conservative Laestadianism occurring over at least 30 years that eventually led to many criminal cases including against several Laestadian lay preachers, resulting in lengthy prison terms. Child welfare worker Johanna Hurtig, Ph.D., herself a Conservative Laestadian, allegedly uncovered the abuse in the course of her research on sex abuse in the Finnish Lutheran church as a whole. After she was ridiculed and dismissed by the Finnish Conservative Laestadian leadership, Hurtig's findings were reported to the media, leading to wide scrutiny of the sect by the Finnish public.

== Associations ==
- North America: Laestadian Lutheran Church (LLC)
- Finland: Central Association of the Finnish Associations of Peace (Suomen Rauhanyhdistysten Keskusyhdistys ry - SRK)
- Sweden and Norway: Central Association of the Swedish Associations of Peace (Sveriges fridsföreningars centralorganisation - SFC)
- Estonia: Estonian Lutheran Association of Peace (Eesti Luterlik Rahuühendus)
- India: Laestadian Revival Movement (Laestadian Lutherans India, with 17000 members)

== Publications ==
Conservative Laestadians have five newspapers, three in Finland and two in North America. Those newspapers are translated into eight languages. The LLC publishes The Voice of Zion and The Shepherd's Voice in English, Finnish, French and Spanish. The SRK in Finland publishes Päivämies, Siionin Lähetyslehti and Lasten polku (previously Siionin Kevät) in Estonian, Finnish, English, German, Russian and Swedish. The hymnal, Songs and Hymns of Zion, has been translated into seven languages. There is also a book which describes Conservative Laestadian doctrine, The Treasure Hidden in a Field. However, the Bible is their most important book.

== Literature ==
- Treasure Hidden in a Field, ISBN 1-887034-04-8
- From Victory to Victory, SRK
- In the Footsteps of the Sheep, ISBN 1-887034-03-X
- By Faith, LLC
- God Is Love, ISBN 1-887034-01-3
- The Storms Will Cease, ISBN 0-8087-0038-3
- Aviva and the First Christmas, LLC

== See also ==
- Association of Peace
- Laestadianism in the Americas

== Sources ==
- Talonen, Jouko (2001). Iustitia 14, STI-aikakauskirja, Lestadiolaisuuden monet kasvot. Lestadiolaisuuden hajaannukset (PDF). Suomen teologinen instituutti (STI). ISBN 952-9857-11-X. Archived from the original (PDF) on 2021-07-28.
- Talonen, Jouko (2012). "Lestadiolaisuuden synty, leviäminen ja hajaannukset. Lestadiolaisuuden tutkija, kirkkohistorian professori Jouko Talosen luento. Virtuaalikirkko has videos from seminar, and they are archived in Internet. Laestadiuksen perintö ja perilliset - seminaari Oulussa 4.-5.10.2012 7. lokakuuta 2012". Oulun hiippakunta, Pohjoinen kulttuuri-instituutti and Oulun ev.-lut. seurakunnat. Archived from the original on 2014-04-13.
