= Laestadianism in the Americas =

Family tree of laestadianism in America

The Laestadian church arrived in North America with Nordic (especially Finnish and Sami) immigrants in the latter half of the 19th century, many of whom came to work in the copper mines of the Keweenaw Peninsula. Some of these new immigrants found themselves in conflict with older, established immigrants from the same countries, being generally poorer and less established, and hewing to the new, fundamentalist teachings of Lars Levi Laestadius, a Swedish-Sami preacher and botanist born in Arjeplog, Sweden. Laestadian congregations separate from the extant Scandinavian Lutheran churches were formed in Cokato, Minnesota, in 1872 and in Calumet, Michigan, in 1873.

== Groups in the Americas in 2013 ==
There are a total of 171,000 Laestadians in the world, with 26,000 of these being based in the Americas.

- Firstborn laestadianism ("Esikoinens") – 10,000 members in the United States (Old Apostolic Lutheran Church)
- Little firstborn group – (Rauhan Sana group) (Federation) ("Mickelsons") 6,000 members in the United States and Canada (Apostolic Lutheran Church of America), and in Guatemala
- Conservative laestadianism – ("Heidemans") 5,000 members in the United States and Canada (Laestadian Lutheran Church), and in Ecuador
- Torola group – 4,000 members in the United States (First Apostolic Lutheran Church)
- Reedites (pollarites) – 3,500 members in the United States (Independent Apostolic Lutheran Church)
- Aunesites – 550 members in the United States (The Apostolic Lutheran Church)
- Grace Apostolic Lutheran Church – about 200 members in South Carolina
- Davidites – 40 members in the United States
- Melvinites – 20 members in the United States

== Terminology ==
Each congregation generally has a name they call themselves, which frequently differs from the name used in this article. In particular, First Apostolic adherents would recoil at being labelled "Laestadian" because for them, "Laestadians" are the opposing side of the 1973 schism. In the interest of editorial clarity, this article uses an internally consistent naming scheme which differs from the names congregations apply to themselves. The term "Laestadian" is used as an umbrella to refer to all churches with a clear succession of belief from the teachings of Lars Levi Laestadius. The respective branches of Laestadian churches recognize their roots with the teachings of Lars Levi Laestadius to varying degrees. The Old Apostolic Lutheran Church, for example, will read a postilla (sermon) of Laestadius along with a text from the Bible with every church service. In contrast, the Pollari congregations do not recognize Laestadius in any of their liturgy and he is not given any special emphasis in their teachings.

The term "Apostolic" does not refer to the doctrine of apostolic succession; rather, it denotes an effort to live as near as possible in the Laestadian view to the Apostle's doctrines and practices.

== Congregations and concentrations ==
As of 2017, significant concentrations of Laestadian adherents and churches which can trace their roots to Laestadianism exist in the following locales:

=== United States ===
- The Mat-Su Valley, Alaska
- Phoenix, Arizona
- Prescott, Arizona
- Hemet, California
- Martinez, California
- Glenwood Springs, Colorado
- Bethel, Connecticut
- Lake Worth, Florida
- Waukegan and Zion, Illinois
- Elkton, Maryland
- Centerville, Massachusetts
- Fitchburg, Massachusetts
- Calumet, Hancock, Houghton, and nearby towns in Michigan (the "Copper Country")
- Brighton, Michigan
- Howell, Michigan
- Ironwood, Michigan
- Iron River, Michigan
- Eben Junction, Michigan
- Negaunee and Ishpeming, Michigan
- Minneapolis–Saint Paul, Minnesota (northwestern suburbs)
- Brainerd, Minnesota
- Cokato, Minnesota
- Dayton, Minnesota (northwest Minneapolis-Saint Paul metro area exurb)
- Deer River, Minnesota
- Duluth and Cloquet, Minnesota
- Eagle Lake Township, Minnesota
- Elk River, Minnesota
- Esko, Minnesota
- Floodwood, Minnesota
- Menahga, Minnesota and surrounding area
- New York Mills, Minnesota
- Rockford, Minnesota
- Virginia, Minnesota
- Kalispell, Montana
- New Ipswich, New Hampshire
- New York City (though small but has a community)
- High Point, North Carolina
- Dickinson, North Dakota
- Portland, Oregon
- Greer, South Carolina
- Hamlin County, South Dakota
- Utah County, Utah (primarily south of Provo, Utah)
- Greenbrier, Tennessee
- Battle Ground, Washington
- Davenport, Washington
- Longview, Washington
- Seattle, Washington (northwestern suburbs)
- Colville, Washington
- Spokane, Washington
- Marengo, Wisconsin
- Kenosha, Wisconsin
- Oulu, Wisconsin
- Wilmington, North Carolina

=== Canada ===
- Lethbridge, Alberta
- Vanderhoof, British Columbia
- Vancouver, British Columbia
- Winnipeg, Manitoba
- Sault Ste. Marie, Ontario
- Toronto, Ontario
- Outlook, Saskatchewan
- Dunblane, Saskatchewan
- Saskatoon, Saskatchewan
- Regina, Saskatchewan

== Beliefs and characteristics ==
American Laestadians practice varied degrees of fundamentalist Christian belief. Most Laestadians avoid alcohol; varying numbers of adherents avoid a number of "worldly" practices, including dancing, card-playing, cinema, television, popular music, and the performing arts (listed in approximate order of avoidance). However, caffeine is widely consumed and tobacco is generally tolerated, but preached against when under 18 as most jurisdictions have laws against minors purchasing tobacco products. Family size tends to be large compared to the American average; most families in non-urban congregations have between 4 and 10 children, while most churches have a few families with 12 or 15 children. Birth control is generally not practiced; it is preached as sin unless after consideration and counsel with medical doctors it is determined to be necessary for the health of the mother. Birth control is not tolerated because it prevents a child from being born and each child is a gift from God.

Laestadian asceticism is distinguished from other American fundamentalist Christians in that none of the above-mentioned pastimes is officially proscribed; rather, Laestadians counsel each other and employ a reinforcing system of social feedback to encourage abstention. Active congregations provide social outlets in keeping with the beliefs of the church; nearly every weekend evening will find Laestadian teenagers congregating at one or another's home (get-togethers), preferably with adults present.

Laestadian churches, in keeping with the Holy Bible, teach that every human is a sinner and that every sin can be forgiven; forgiveness stems from the hearts of Laestadians, not from ceremony or hierarchy. Some Laestadians practice lay confession, whereby a member confesses to another member; in the Heidemanian tradition, some vestige of this practice remains in the liturgy but confession is not widely practiced.

Some Laestadian congregations consider themselves the one, true Christian church, and preach that all other Christian churches (including other branches of the Laestadian tradition) are not true Christians.

== Ceremony and service in the Heidemanian tradition ==
American Laestadian churches provide services in Finnish to varying degrees; As of 2000, every service in some congregations is bilingual, while in others only special occasions merit translation, and in yet others all preaching is done in English. In any case, a Laestadian may request to receive Communion in Finnish; another lay member of the congregation can deliver Communion if the pastor is not fluent. Communion is the only regularly practiced ceremony (performed once or twice a month, or every week, depending on the congregation), and consists of unleavened wafers and wine (sometimes grape juice), delivered assembly-line fashion at a communion rail at the conclusion of Sunday services.

Teenagers undergo Confirmation around age 13 to 15, after which they are eligible for communion. Other significant life ceremonies are baptism (performed during the first months of life, and rarely for adult converts) and marriage.

The Old Apostolic Lutheran congregations hold annual Elders' Meetings, often combined with St. John's summer services, several days to one week long, with guest preachers delivering evening sermons each weekday and two or more church services on the bracketing Sundays. Elders (senior preachers) from Lapland are invited to teach. Many church members follow the elders as they travel across America visiting different congregations. Other Apostolic Lutheran bodies hold similar "big services," in which members of multiple congregations gather in one location to hear speakers from the United States and from Scandinavia (if they have a cooperating European counterpart).

== Sources ==
- Talonen, Jouko (2001). "Lestadiolaisuuden Hajaannukset" (PDF). Lustitia (in Finnish). 14. Suomen Teologinen Instituutti. ISBN 952-9857-11-X. Archived from the original (PDF) on January 16, 2014.
- Talonen, Jouko (October 7, 2012). "Laestadiuksen perintö ja perilliset: Lestadiolaisuuden synty, leviäminen ja hajaannukset". Virtuaalikirkko (in Finnish). Diocese of Oulu, Pohjoinen Kulttuuri-instituutti, and Oulu Evangelical-Lutheran Congregations. Archived from the original on April 13, 2014.
- Lankton, Larry (1991). Cradle to Grave: Life, Work and Death at the Lake Superior Copper Mines. Oxford University Press. ISBN 0-19-506263-9.
