= Peräpohjalaiset =

Finnish ethnic group

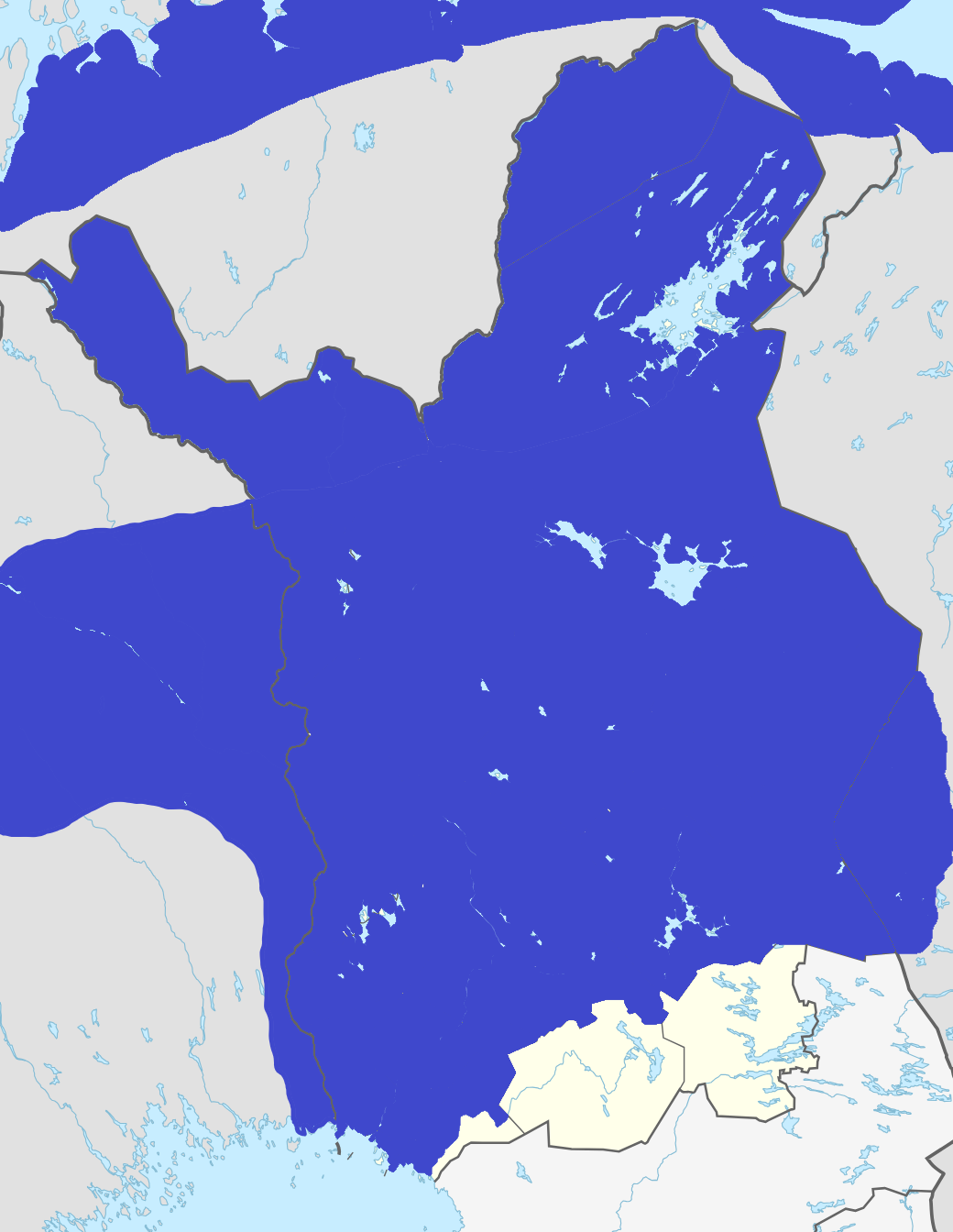
The area where Peräpohjola dialects are traditionally spoken.

Peräpohjola. Individuals north of this area might prefer the term lappilaiset.

Peräpohjalaiset (lit. 'Rear Bothnians') or Lappilaiset (lit. 'Laplanders') are a subgroup of Finns who traditionally speak Peräpohjola dialects of Finnish and live in the Lapland region in Finland.

Peräpohjola identity and culture is often described as having born from the mixing of Finnish North Ostrobothnians and the Sámi. Many old Lapland families feel like they are not fully Finnish or fully Sámi, but something else living between the two cultures. There are also multiple different local identities within the term lappilainen.

== Name ==
The name Peräpohjola ("Rear Bothnia") is more historical for the area, but Lappi ("Lapland") has become increasingly more common due to tourist advertising and the formation of the Lapland (Lappi) region.

In 1955, Lapland author Annikki Kariniemi considered it "unthinkable" if they were called lappilaiset instead of peräpohjalaiset or peräpohjolalaiset. Similarly in 1948, journalist Valde Näsi wrote only areas north of Rovaniemi could be called "Lappi". Individuals from more northern parts of the region could identify with the term lappilaiset, seeing peräpohjalaiset as something that refers to the southern parts of the region only.

Matters of identity in Lapland have become controversial within the last decades, especially around the questions of who is "real Sámi" or "real native" to the area. Some Finnish-speaking individuals with Finnish and Sámi ancestry have chosen to call themselves metsälappalaiset or metsäsaamelaiset ("Forest Lapps" or "Forest Sámi") but might not be recognized as Sámi by the Sámi Parliament of Finland. According to Sámi culture professor Veli-Pekka Lehtola, these people live between two cultures.

PhD Heli Saarinen has disapproved of the term peräpohjalainen as it includes perä- ("rear"). Maria Lähteenmäki suggested the term Väli-Lappi ("Middle Lapland") to refer to the borderlands of Finns and Sámi. According to Sámi activist Petra Laiti, the terms "Lapland" and "Lappland" should be dropped completely as derogatory towards the Sámi people, and she herself has chosen to call the parts of "Lapland" which are not within Sápmi as "Perä-Pohjola".

== History ==
The first Finnish inhabitants of Peräpohjola were from Tavastia at around 1000–1150 CE. There are signs of settled agriculture in Tornio from this time period. It is difficult to determine to which degree there were migrants compared to earlier inhabitants. Christianity reached the area relatively early, as there were already churches in Tornio and Kemi in the early 14th century. In the 14th and 15th centuries, a new wave of migrants came from Southwestern Finland, mainly to Torne Valley. North and Central Ostrobothnians also initially formed from migration out of Lower Satakunta and northern parts of Southwestern Finland. The dialect, place names and other historical information show that migrants moved to the areas of Torne and Kemi rivers from both Western Finland and Karelia.

== Culture ==
=== Descriptions ===
Stereotypes describe lappilaiset as extreme ends in anything, be it religion or drinking, as well as direct, calm, content with little, appreciating honesty, jealous, and leisured sensualists. The card game Tuppi is very popular.

According to author Ville-Juhani Sutinen, there are multiple different "Laplands" in Finland. First is the one sold to and imagined by tourists, second is Sápmi, and third is Peräpohjola which was historically the northernmost part of Ostrobothnia. Similarly, he divided the inhabitants of Lapland region: the Sámi, the Finns who had moved there and made it their home over generations, and Peräpohjalaiset with their own traditions and culture.

=== National dresses and textiles ===
Multiple national dresses and suits have been reconstructed from Peräpohjola. Finnish national dresses are reconstructions of late 18th century and early 19th century peasants' festive clothing. The dresses and suits are: Peräpohjola women's dress (which also takes elements from Kainuu clothing), Alatornio women's dress, Rovaniemi women's dress and men's suit, Torne Valley women's dress, and Tervola women's dress and men's suit.

Peräpohjola has its own style of raanu tapestries called the Rear Bothnian half-piled rug (Peräpohjolan puolinukkaraanu), which often displays images of fishing, as well as animal husbandry and reindeer herding.

== Sources ==
- Huurre, Matti (1983). Pohjois-Pohjanmaan ja Lapin historia I. Pohjois-Pohjanmaan maakuntaliiton ja Lapin maakuntaliiton yhteinen historiatoimikunta. ISBN 951-99508-3-4.
- Lehtola, Veli-Pekka (2015). Saamelaiskiista — sortaako Suomi alkuperäiskansaansa? Into. ISBN 978-952-264-458-9.
- Nykänen, Tapio (2022). Lapin ihminen. Helsinki: Finnish Literature Society. ISBN 978-951-858-570-4.
- Siikala, Anna-Leena (2012). Itämerensuomalaisten mytologia. Helsinki: Finnish Literature Society. ISBN 978-952-222-393-7.
- Sutinen, Ville-Juhani (2022). Matkalla Suomeen — Tarinoita heimojen maasta. Into. ISBN 978-952-351-803-2.
