= Virsiä Meänkielelä =

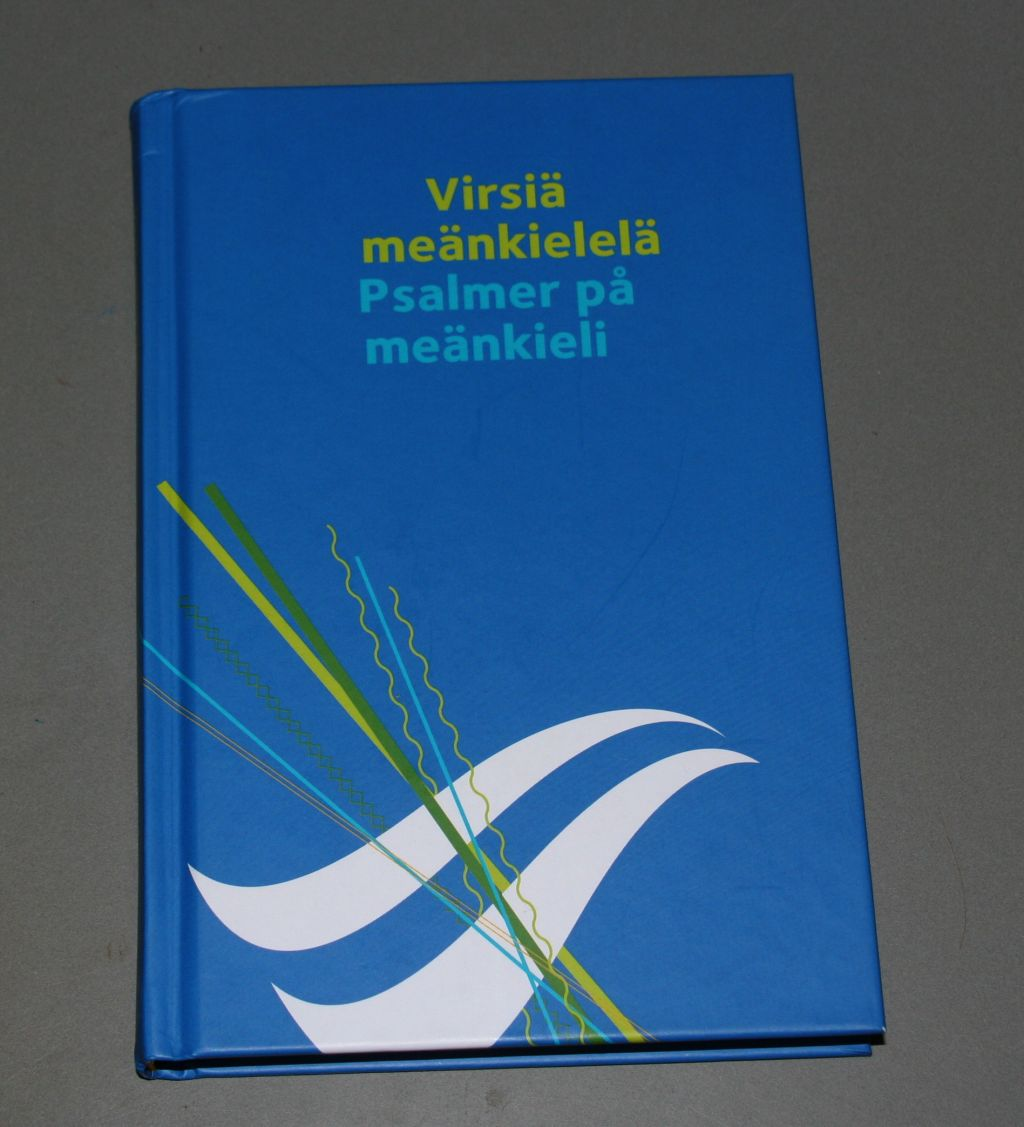
Virsiä Meänkielelä

Hymns in Meänkieli – Psalmer på meänkieli is the hymnbook of the Church of Sweden in Meänkieli, which is one of the official minority languages spoken in Sweden. The Church of Sweden offers services in Meänkieli, and to support this, some of the church's service books have been translated into Meänkieli.

== Description ==
In 2010, a project began with the goal of translating hymns from the Church of Sweden's hymnbook into Meänkieli. Initially, the Diocese of Luleå led the work, but from 2012 onwards, it became a national project of the Church of Sweden. The hymns were translated by a working group that included Inga Britt Uusitalo, Gun Olofsson, Bertil Isaksson, Bengt Kostenius, Linnéa Nylund, Bengt Pohjanen, and Ritvaelsa Seppälä.

The collection includes 124 hymns from the Church of Sweden's hymnbook (Den svenska psalmboken med tillägg, 2002) as well as four other songs, including "Saunavirsi" (Sauna psalm) and "Tornionlaakson laulu" (Song of the Tornedalians). The hymnal features a mix of old, popular hymns, new hymns, hymns for church services, hymns for various times of the church year, hymns for different times of the day, and hymns suitable for worship. The hymns follow the Torne Valley dialects of Meänkieli.

The numbering of the hymns follows the numbering from the Church of Sweden's 1986 hymnbook. The organization of the hymns into sections is also the same as in the Church of Sweden's hymnbook, although some sections have no hymns translated. The Church of Sweden's General Synod approved the collection in November 2019.
