= Lannankieli =

Variant of Meänkieli

- Native to: Sweden
- Region: Kiruna
- Ethnicity: Lantalaiset
- Language family: Uralic: Finnic; Finnish; Peräpohjola; Meänkieli; Lannankieli

Official status
- Recognised minority language in: Sweden

Language codes
- ISO 639-3: –
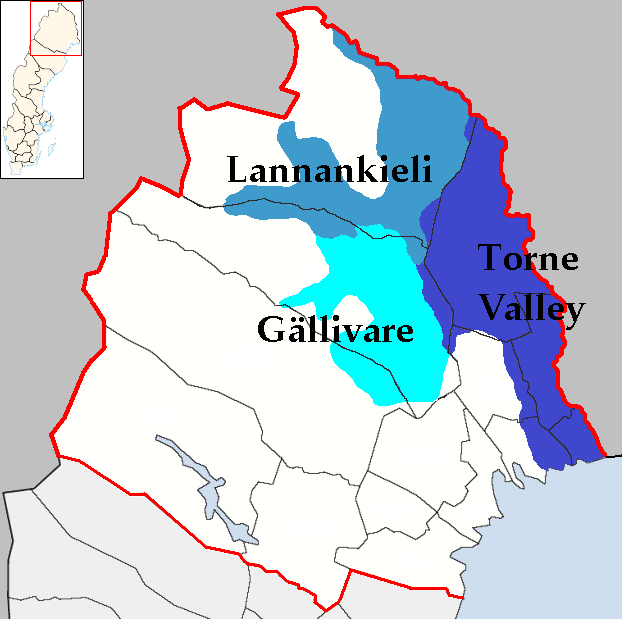
- Traditional spread of the Meänkieli variants, including Lannankieli

Lannankieli is one of the three variants of Meänkieli, including the Torne valley variant and the Gällivare dialects. Lannankieli is mutually integible with the two other variants of Meänkieli, however there exists some lexical differences.

== Details ==
Lannankieli is spoken around the towns of Jukkasjärvi, Kurravaara and Kiruna, and there have been efforts to support the variant of Meänkieli. And there have been attempts to create Meänkieli literature specifically in the Lannankieli variant. However, despite this, Lannankieli alongside Gällivare dialects are more vulnerable than the Torneo Valley variant of Meänkieli.

== Features ==
Lannankieli has several unique features, including but not limited to:

- Passive form in place of the third person plural ending
- the -et ending: huonet, venet instead of huone, vene
- Triphthongs: tieitten, työissä, viei
- K:J consonant gradation: väki - väjen
- K:V consonant gradation: joki - joven
- short vowel after metathesis-h: hiithen instead of hiitheen

In the Kaalasvuoma dialect unstressed -o also becomes -u, like in Gällivare.
