= Gällivare dialects =

Group of dialects of Peräpohjola

- Gällivare Finnish
- Jellivaaranvarieteetti
- Native to: Sweden
- Region: Gällivare
- Ethnicity: Tornedalians
- Language family: Uralic: Finnic; North Finnic; Finnish; Peräpohjola; Meänkieli; Gällivare dialects

Official status
- Recognised minority language in: Sweden

Language codes
- ISO 639-3: –
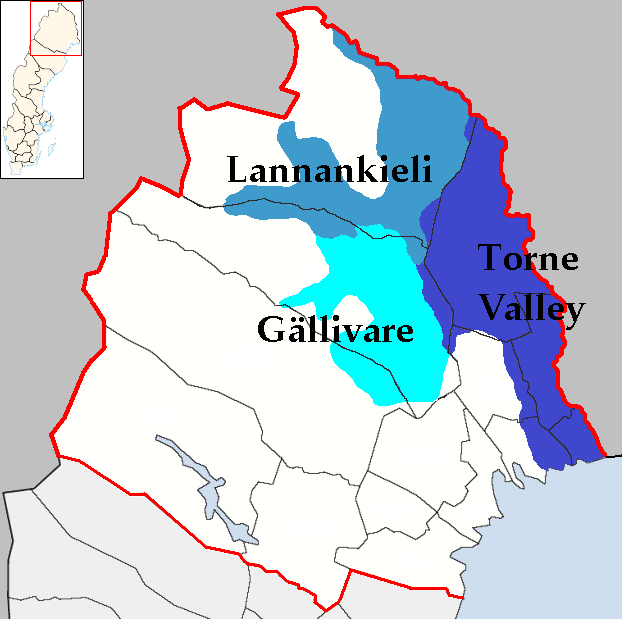
- Traditional spread of the Meänkieli variants, including the Gällivare dialects

Gällivare dialects (Meänkieli: Jellivaaranvarieteetti), alternately Gällivare Finnish (Swedish: Gällivarefinska, Finnish: Jällivaaransuomi), the Gällivare variant (Swedish: Gällivarevarietet) or, in more colloquial Swedish, village Finnish (byfinska), are a dialect group of Meänkieli (which also includes the Torne Valley dialects and Lannankieli). Meänkieli is recognized in Sweden as an independent Finnic language for political, sociological and historical reasons, but it is sometimes considered as a group of Peräpohjola dialects of Finnish due to their close mutual intelligibility. The Gällivare dialects are spoken around Gällivare, but also in Killivaara and Nattavaara.

Features of the dialects are absence of Vowel harmony: kyla 'village' (Meänkieli and Finnish: kylä), and the passive being used for the third person plural ending: äijät poltethin (Finnish: ukot polttivat). The dialect is also heavily influenced by Swedish and many loanwords have entered the Gällivare dialects. A Gällivare dialect dictionary was made in 1992 by Birger Winsa.

== Features ==
- Passive being used for the third person plural ending
- /o/ has changed to /u/ often: isu 'big', (Finnish: iso).
- Triphthongs: syöi 'ate'.

== Example ==
- Oliko tännet tietä ennen?
- Ei.
- Eei oles, tie on. jaa, kyllä se on kuuskymmentä vuotta aikaa tullu.
- Juust vasta tie tehty.
- Sit ei ol ollu tietä, se on ollu liki Jällivaarhaav viis peniŋkulmaa kantant.
- Ei se niiv niin ra hauska homma sekkää.
- Ei ole miellùtta olleŋkha.
- Täältä kaloja vienhet ja vaihethanhej jauhuja ja kaffi(a ja sokkeri(a.
- Takka mennessä takka tullessa.
- Joo.
- Joo mie olen kans kokenu se reissu.
- Joo hän on kantannu mutta mi en ole kantan.
- Niit on ollu äijjiä jokka oŋ kantanhe sata kilua jauhuja. se on ollu lujat miehet en enne vanhast. Seon niemess oll yks äijä joka oŋ kantanu, sata kilu- Ollin Filppaaksi sanotti. sata kilua lyöny selkhän̬, ja lähteny marsii. ja eikä sollu pitkä.

== See also ==
- Meänkieli
- Peräpohja dialects
