= Torne Valley dialects =

Group of Finnic varieties in Sweden and Finland

Torne valley dialects
- Finnish: Tornion murteet Meänkieli: Tornionlaaksonvarieteetti
- Native to: Finland; Sweden
- Region: Torne Valley
- Ethnicity: Tornedalians
- Language family: Uralic: Finnic; Finnish; Peräpohjola dialects; Torne valley dialects

Official status
- Recognised minority language in: Sweden

Language codes
- ISO 639-3: –
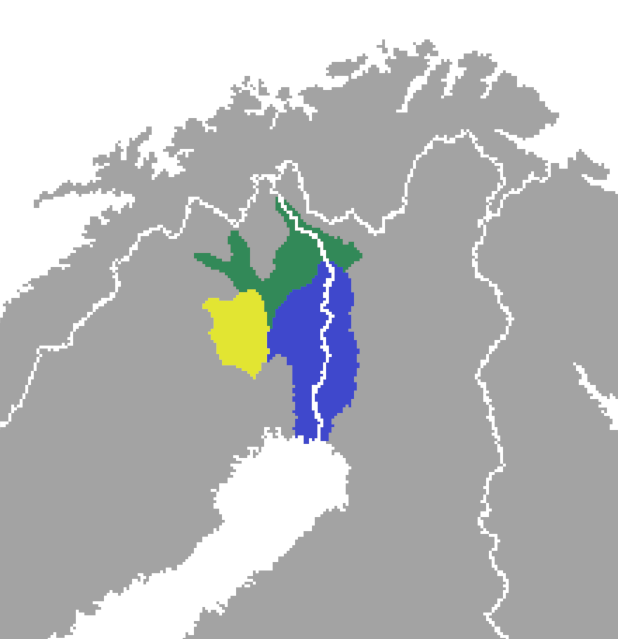
- Traditional spread of the Western Peräpohja variants, including the Torne valley dialects in blue.

Torne Valley dialects (Finnish: Tornion murteet, Meänkieli: tornionlaaksonvarieteetti, Swedish: Tornedalsvarietet) are a Finnic variant spoken in Sweden and Finland. The form of the Torne Valley dialects in Finland are included as a part of the Peräpohjola dialect group, while the form in Sweden is included as the biggest one of the three variants of Meänkieli (also including Lannankieli and the Gällivare dialects), which in Sweden has an independent status from Finnish. Although the independent status of Meänkieli as a distinct Finnic language is sometimes disputed due to its high mutual intelligibility with Finnish.

== History ==
The Torneo Valley dialects were once fully uniform and old standard Finnish was used by all speakers of the Torne Valley dialects. However, in 1809 when Russia annexed Finland, the dialects on the Swedish side of the border were separated from the ones spoken in Finland. This caused the Torne Valley dialects in Sweden to have been more strongly influenced by Swedish than the Torne Valley dialects in Finland.

== In Sweden ==
The Torne Valley dialects spoken in Pajala, Övertorneå and Haparanda form the basis of the standard Meänkieli literary language and the two other variants of Meänkieli are much more endangered than the Torne Valley dialects. Meänkieli is primarily considered a separate language in Sweden due to historical, sociological and political reasons arising from the creation of the 1809 border between Sweden and Finland. However, on purely linguistic grounds, it may be viewed as a dialect of Finnish as it is highly mutually integible with the dialects spoken in Finland, although it contains much stronger influences from Swedish and has conserved some archaic features which the dialects in Finland have lost.

== In Finland ==
The Torne Valley dialects are spoken in Enontekiö, Kolari, Muonio, Pello, and Ylitornio in Finland. Unlike other Peräpohjola dialects, the aspiration of consonants is still regularly used in Finnish Torne Valley dialects.
