= Peräpohjola dialects =

Group of dialects of Finnish

Peräpohjola
- Native to: Finland; Norway; Sweden
- Region: Lapland (Finland); Lapland (Sweden); Norrbotten; Finnmark; Troms
- Ethnicity: Peräpohjalaiset; Tornedalians; Kvens
- Language family: Uralic: Finno-Ugric; Finnic; Northern Finnic; Finnish; Peräpohjola

Language codes
- ISO 639-3: –
- Glottolog: None
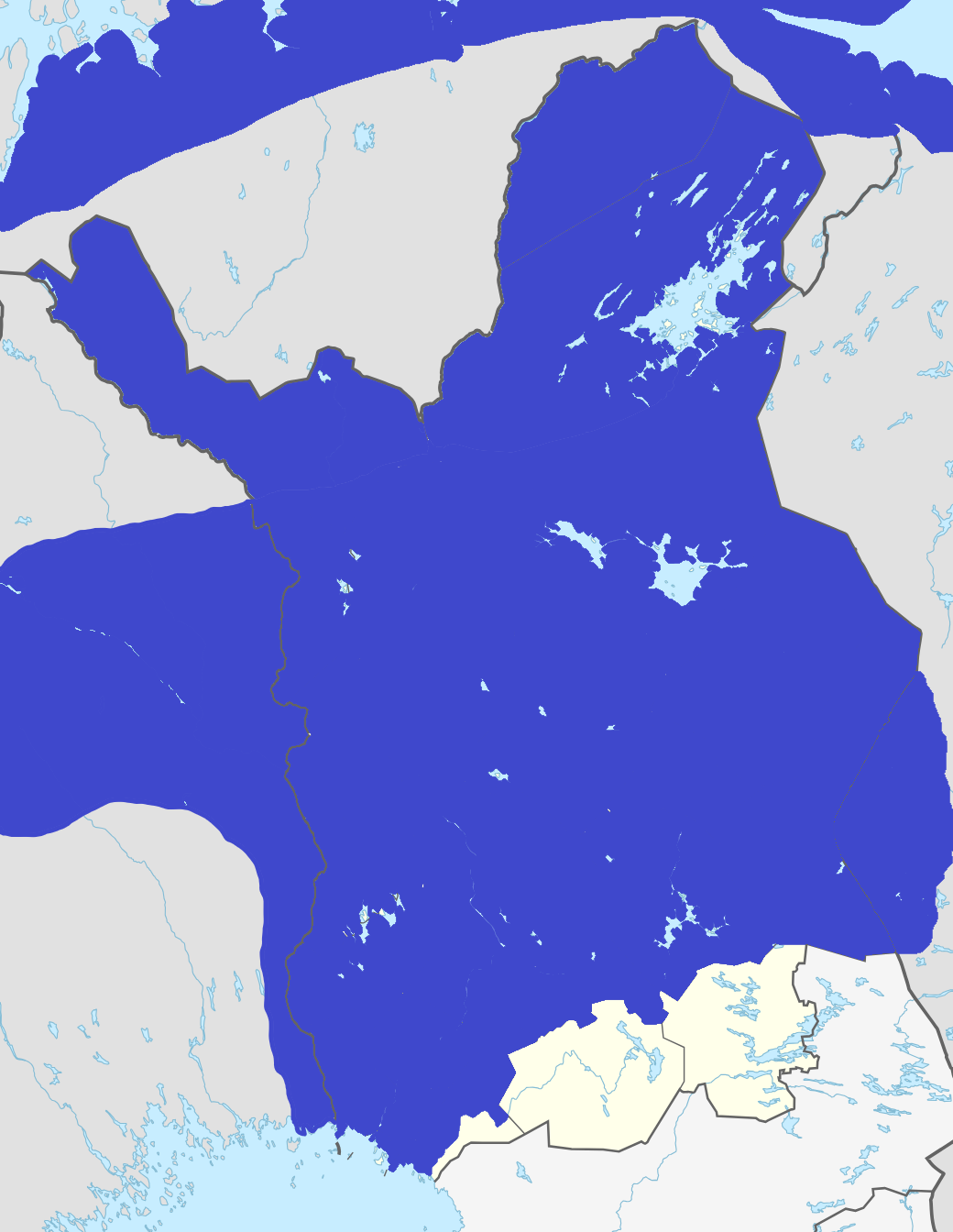
- Spread of the Peräpohjola dialects in the 20th century.

The Peräpohjola dialects (Finnish: Peräpohjalaiset murteet) are a group of Finnish dialects traditionally spoken in the regions of Lapland, Norrbotten and Finnmark. However, due to primarily historical, political and sociological reasons, some traditional Peräpohja dialects have been granted the status of independent Finnic languages in Sweden and Norway. These forms of speech are called Meänkieli in Sweden (Including the Torne Valley dialects, Lannankieli and the Gällivare dialects), while in Norway the traditional Ruija dialects were recognized as forming the Kven language, which both were isolated from the development of modern standard Finnish. However, the status of these two Finnic variants as their own languages is still sometimes disputed due to their close mutual intelligibility with Finnish.

== Features ==
Like the Northern Ostrobothnian (Oulu) dialects, Peräpohjola dialects are Western dialects that show features from Eastern dialects. For instance the reflex to standard -ts- in metsä is mettä according to a Western pattern, whereas the reflex of standard -d- is deletion, 'j', or 'v', as in Eastern dialects, e.g. vedän - vejän. Epenthetic vowels (tyhjä - tyhyjä) are not common although found in southern Tornio dialects. There are no vowel or diphthong changes, a Western/standard feature, but there is a general gemination of consonants in short initial syllables (e.g. standard makaa is makkaa), as in Oulu and Eastern dialects. Palatalization is absent, which is a very Western feature, since palatalization occurs even in the (Western) Oulu dialect.

A unique feature is that unstressed syllables in e.g. the illative case are preceded with an emphatic 'h', e.g. talhon vs. standard taloon, menhään vs. standard mennään. This is highly distinctive but very difficult for outsiders to imitate correctly. The pronouns are also distinct: mie (minä, "I") and sie (sinä, "you"(sg.)) are Eastern-like, while met and meän (me and meidän, "we" and "our(s)") and tet and teän (te and teidän, you (pl.) and your(s) (pl.)) are unique to Peräpohjola. Also, the reflex to the standard third-person verb suffix -vat ("they") is a simple -t, e.g. annoit vs antoivat.

== Dialects ==
=== Kemi dialects ===
Kemi dialects are spoken in Finland in the municipalities of Inari, Kemi, Kittilä, Rovaniemi, Simo, Sodankylä, Tervola and Utsjoki.

=== Kemijärvi dialects ===
Kemijärvi dialects are spoken in Kemijärvi, Pelkosenniemi, Salla and Savukoski.

=== Torne Valley dialects ===
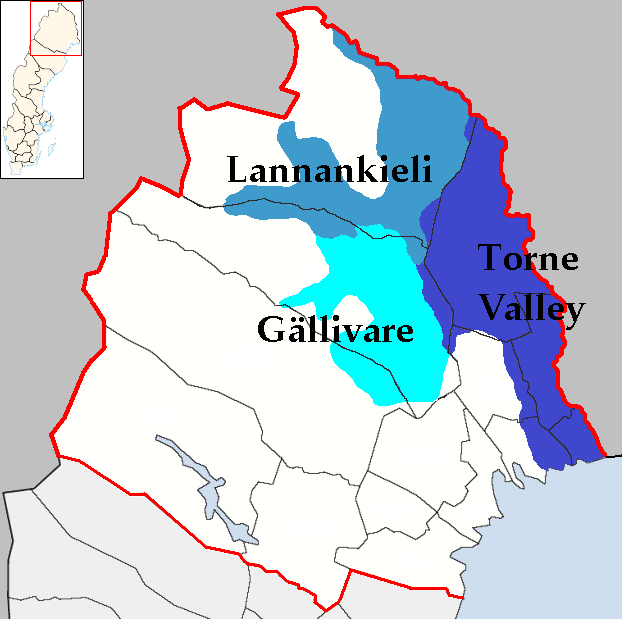
Traditional spread of Meänkieli variants in Sweden

Torne Valley dialects are spoken in the area surrounding Torne River in Finnish Peräpohjola (North Bothnia) and on the Swedish side of the river (Norrbotten). In Finland, Tornio dialects are spoken in the municipalities of Tornio, Enontekiö, Kolari, Muonio, Pello and Ylitornio. In Sweden they are spoken in Haparanda, Hedenäset, Junosuando, Karesuando, Karungi, Korpilombolo, Pajala, Tärendö, Vittangi, and Övertorneå.

The Torne Valley dialects spoken in Pajala, Övertorneå and Haparanda form the basis of the standard Meänkieli literary language, which in Sweden is recognized as an independent Finnic language, distinct from Finnish. Meänkieli is primarily considered a separate language in Sweden due to historical, sociological and political reasons arising from the creation of the 1809 border between Sweden and Finland. However on purely linguistic grounds, it may be viewed as a dialect of Finnish as it is highly mutually integible with the dialects spoken in Finland, although it contains much stronger influences from Swedish and has conserved some archaic features which the dialects in Finland have lost, such as the conjugation of the word häätyy 'must'.

=== Gällivare dialects ===
Gällivare dialects are spoken in Sweden in Gällivare and some surrounding villages. Finnish language has been a common language spoken at home in the area but the dialects differ quite much from those spoken on the Finnish side of the border.

The Gällivare dialects together with the Torne Valley dialects and Lannankieli form the basis of the Meänkieli language in Sweden. Meänkieli has an official minority language status in some municipalities in northern Sweden.

=== Ruija dialects ===
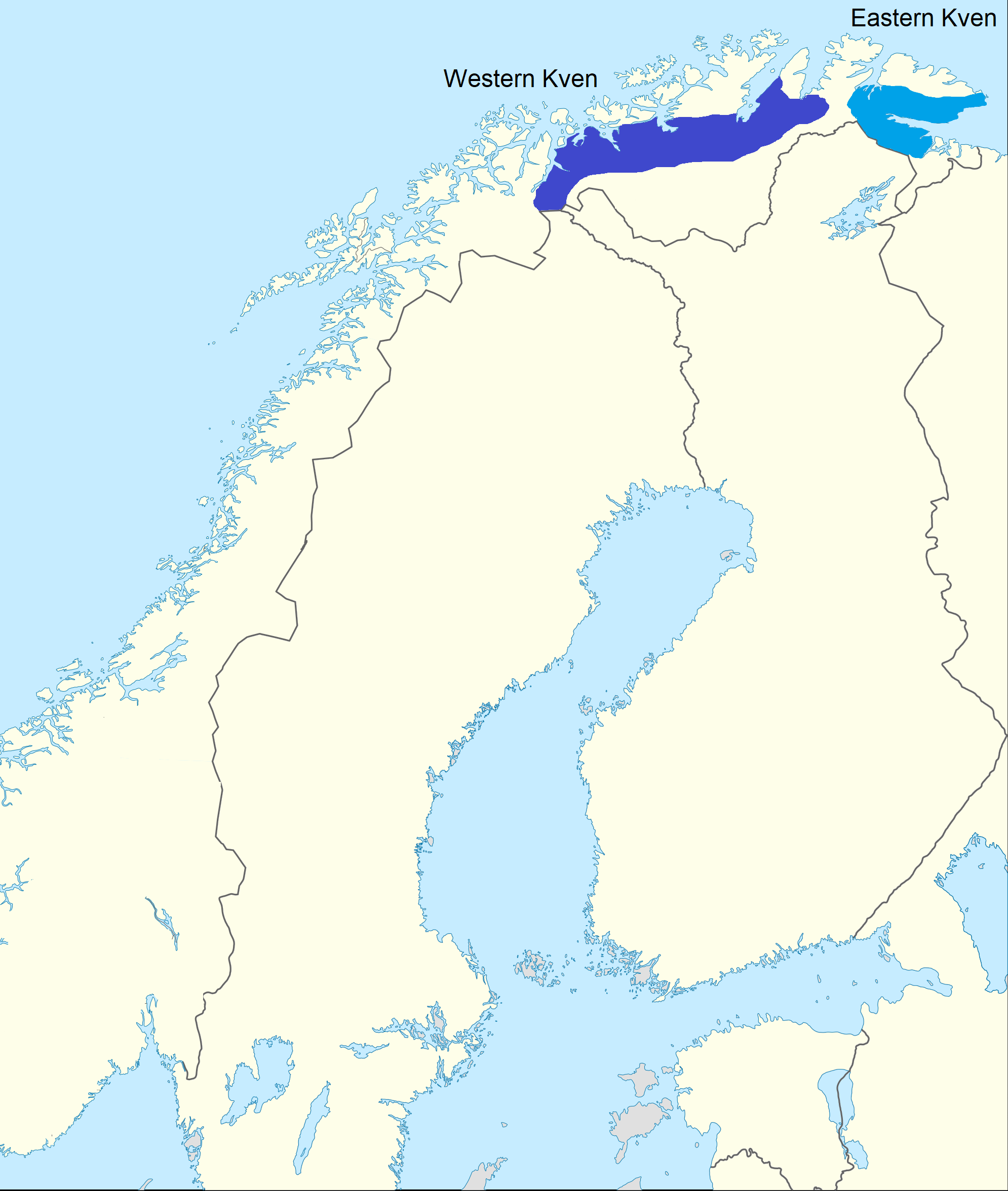
Kven on the map

Ruija dialects are spoken in Northern Norway in Alta, Kvænangen, Lyngen, Porsanger, Nordreisa and Vadsø. This form of speech is called Kven language in Norway for political and historical reasons. There are about 1,500 to 10,000 known native speakers of the Ruija dialects or Kven, most of whom are over the age of 60. Middle-aged speakers tend to have a passing knowledge of it. One major feature of the Ruija dialects or Kven is the retaining of the sound /ð/. For instance, the word syöđä ('to eat') in Kven is syödä in standard Finnish. In addition, due to loanwords, the sound /ʃ/ is much more common in Kven than in standard Finnish: for example, Kven prošekti ('project'), compared to standard Finnish projekti.

== See also ==
- Peräpohjola
- North Ostrobothnian dialects
- Murmansk Finns
