= Vittangi SK =

Swedish sports club

- Full name: Vittangi sportklubb
- Sport: Soccer, Track and Field athletics, Gymnastics, Physical exercise, Skiing
- Founded: 1959
- Based in: Vittangi, Sweden

Vittangi SK is a sports club in Vittangi, Sweden, established in 1959.

The women's soccer team played in the Swedish top division in 1982.
