= Meänmaa Flag Day =

Flag of Tornedalians

Meänmaa Flag Day (Meänkieli: Meän flakupäivä), Meänmaa Day or Torne Valley Day is a holiday celebrated in the Torne Valley/Meänmaa region on 15 July. The tradition was started by the association "Meänmaan Tinkerit", founded in 2007. The day has been marked as an official holiday in the Swedish calendar since 2015.

== History ==
On 15 July 2017, a group of around 70 people from both sides of the border between Sweden and Finland gathered on the bridge between Ylitornio and Aavasaksa. The event began at 11:30 am with the carrying of flags from both Övertorneå on the Swedish side and Aavasaksa on the Finnish side. The groups met in the middle of the bridge, where a symbolic border stone was dropped from the bridge into the river as a sign of cross-border cooperation. Afterwards, a song in Meänkieli called "The River has Always Been" was sung.

On 20 July, a seminar was also held in Ylitornio about the Flag Day and the ceremony, where participants could join the Meänmaan Tinkerit association. The association's membership card was designed to look like a Meänmaa passport. The flag-raising day became the association's annual national day.

After the day was established, the Meänmaan Tinkerit association proposed to the Swedish Academy that the day be added to the calendar. In response, the STR-T association, which represents the Tornedalians, filed a complaint, arguing that not all residents of the region had been consulted. The issue was discussed, and in 2013 an agreement was reached to celebrate 15 July as a day for both the Tornedalians and the Kvens. Once all associations agreed on a common flag day, it meant that the day was for more than just Meänkieli speakers.
