= Lehtola =

Lehtola is a Finnish surname.

== Geographical distribution ==
As of 2014, 84.6% of all known bearers of the surname Lehtola were residents of Finland (frequency 1:1,797), 8.5% of the United States (1:1,172,894) and 5.3% of Sweden (1:51,285).

In Finland, the frequency of the surname was higher than national average (1:1,797) in the following regions:

1. North Ostrobothnia (1:688)
2. South Ostrobothnia (1:746)
3. Lapland (1:1,025)
4. Kymenlaakso (1:1,436)
5. Satakunta (1:1,452)
6. Southwest Finland (1:1,627)
7. Tavastia Proper (1:1,706)

== People ==
- Kari Lehtola (1938–2019), Finnish lawyer
- Veli-Pekka Lehtola (born 1957), North Sámi historian and academic
- Minna Lehtola (born 1967), Finnish fencer
