= Puda =

Puda is a surname. Notable people with the surname include:

- Grzegorz Puda (born 1982), Polish politician and local government official
- Marta Puda (born 1991), Polish sabre fencer

== See also ==
- Pudas
- Pueblo Depot Activity, also known as PUDA, a former U.S. Army ammunition storage facility
