= Nutukas =

Traditional fur boot of the Sámi people

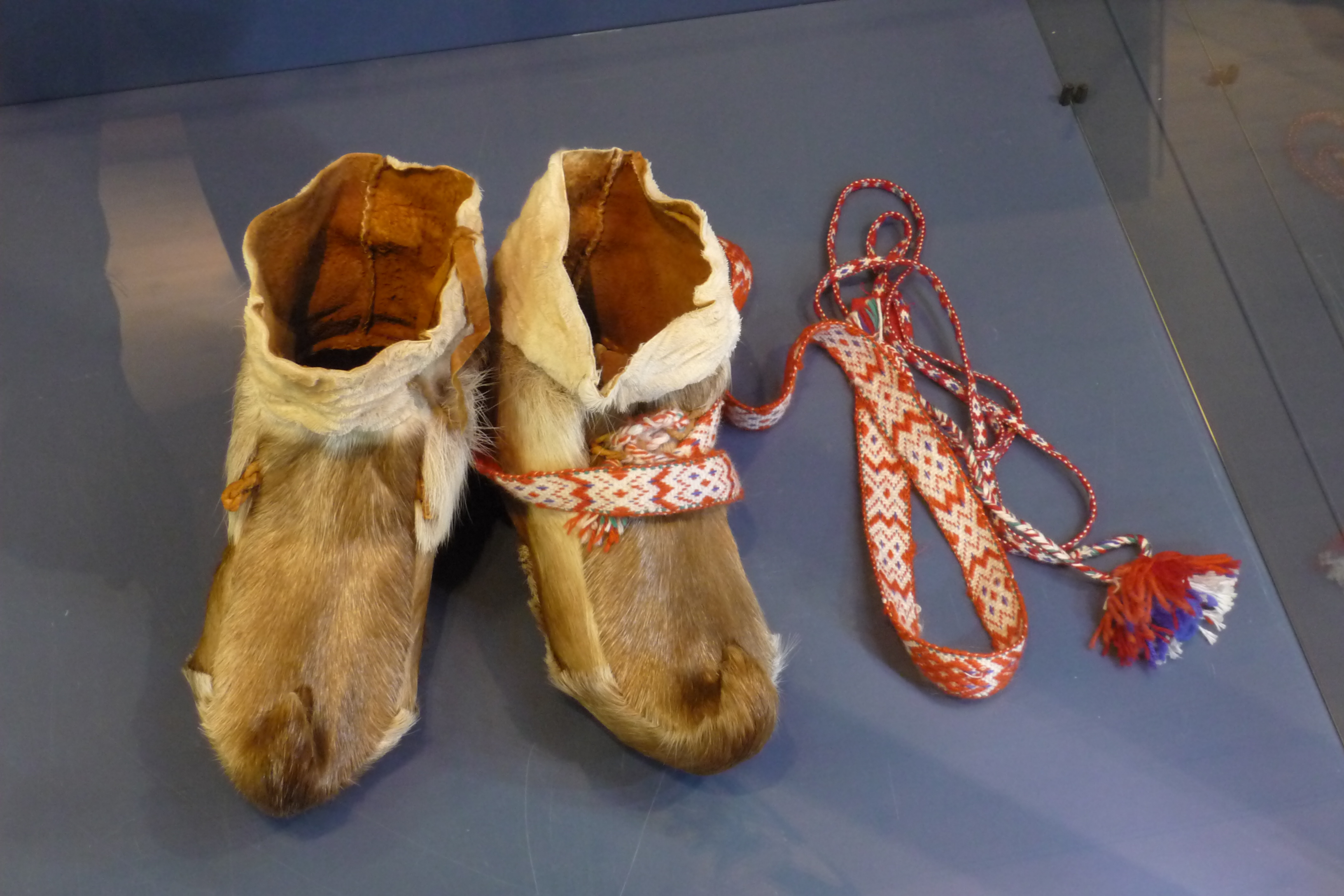
Nutukas on display at the Arktikum Science Museum in Rovaniemi, Finland.

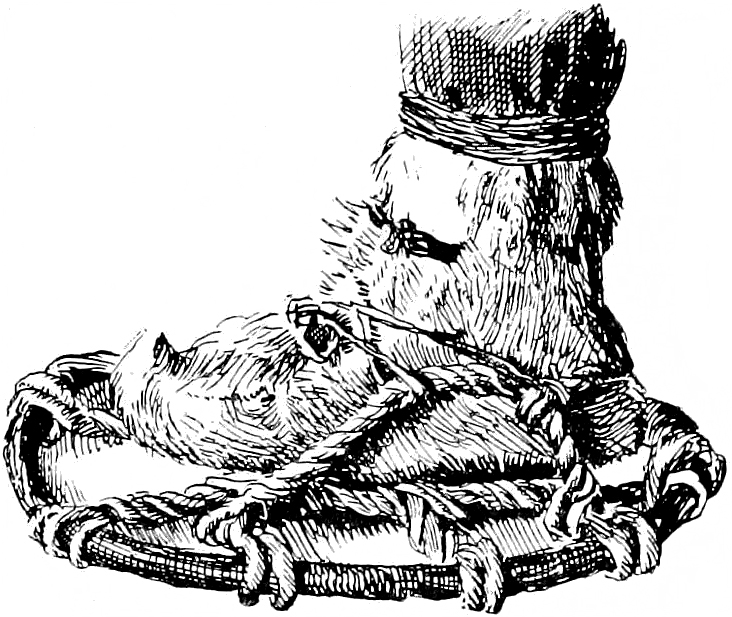
A Sámi finnesko, along with a snowshoe, used in Fridtjof Nansen's Greenland expedition of 1890.

Nutukas (Finnish; Lule Sami: nuvtaga, Northern Sami: nuvttagat, Southern Sami: novteagajat), finnesko (Norwegian for "Sámi shoe"), or simply Sámi boots, are traditional Sámi beaked shoes made of reindeer hide. Because they are soft, the nutukas will not freeze as solidly as thick boot leather, making them relatively easy to put on after overnight exposure to subzero temperatures. From 1890, they are regularly mentioned in accounts of polar travel.

== Construction ==
Nutukas are made from soft hide, traditionally from a reindeer's leg or head, with the fur left on and sewn so that the fur is on the outside of the boot. On the sole, the pieces are assembled with cut in the middle so that the fur goes in different directions to improve traction in snow. The shaft of the boot is laced with a wide strap (called a vuoddagat in Northern Sámi or a skallebånd in Norwegian), often highly decorative, that is wound in several rows to keep snow out of the boot. Traditionally, a grass, (such as sennegrass), was used inside the boot to keep the foot dry and warm; now, a felt slipper or valenki is commonly worn instead.

The stiff beaked toe of Sámi boots differentiate nutukas from mukluks and other styles of Arctic footwear. Although the shape of the curved-up beak varies regionally, it serves the same purpose of helping to hold firm a traditional binding strap on a pair of skis. This upturned toe helps to keep the boot from sliding back and out of the binding as the ski kicks back.

== Terminology ==
The word "nutukas" is borrowed into English from Finnish, which adapted it from Sámi languages. In various Sámi languages, such boots are called in Northern Sami: nuvttot or gállohat; Lule Sami: nuvtaga; Southern Sami: novhtehke or gejhkehke; Kildin Sami: пиматҍ (pimat'); Skolt Sami: nu'trneǩ; Inari Sami: njuuppâh; Pite Sami: guobok; and Ume Sami: nuuhtahka, most of which apparently derive from a Proto-Samic *nu(v)ttVkke̮. Finnesko is an antiquated word coming from Norwegian. In contemporary Norwegian (both Bokmål and Nynorsk), nutukas are referred to as skaller. In Swedish, the boots are referred to as bällingsko (bälling = reindeer's leg skin), while in Russian they are called пимы (pimy). Nutukas are also traditionally used by Tornedalians. In Meänkieli they are called siepakka or nutukka.

== Variations ==
The style and form of nutukas varies depending on the cultural area and the wearer. Similar footwear is used by other indigenous peoples of the Eurasian Arctic:

- Kisy – traditional shoes of the indigenous peoples of the Far North (Khanty, Komi, Mansi, Nenets, etc.), sewn from skins from the calf of a reindeer, with a thick sole, knee-high, often with a small heel.
- Pimy – national shoes of the Uralic peoples. It is also common among Starozhily in the Arctic and Siberia. They are boots made of the skin from the feet of a reindeer (less often – from the skin from the forehead of a reindeer), which are made with wool outwards.
- Unty – boots made of sheep, reindeer or dog skin.
