= Övertorneå Municipality =

Övertorneå Municipality Övertorneå kommun
- Municipality
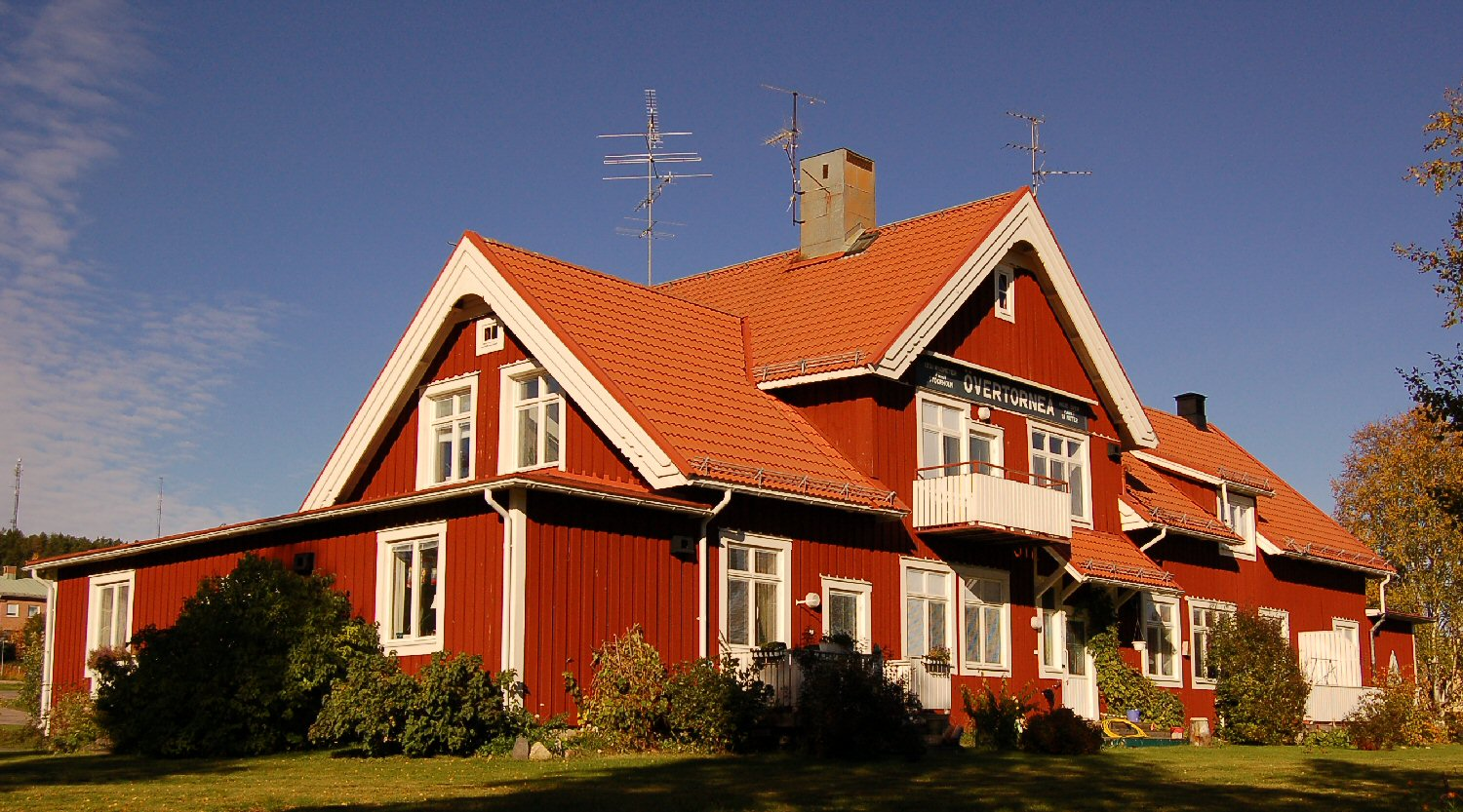
- Övertorneå Railway Station

- Coat of arms

- Coordinates: 66°23′N 23°40′E
- Country: Sweden
- County: Norrbotten County
- Seat: Övertorneå

Area
  - Total: 2,492.29 km^{2} (962.28 sq mi)
  - Land: 2,362.07 km^{2} (912.00 sq mi)
  - Water: 130.22 km^{2} (50.28 sq mi)
- Area as of 1 January 2014.

Population (30 June 2025)
  - Total: 4,031
  - Density: 1.707/km^{2} (4.420/sq mi)
- Time zone: UTC+1 (CET)
  - Summer (DST): UTC+2 (CEST)
- ISO 3166 code: SE
- Province: Norrbotten
- Municipal code: 2518
- Website: www.overtornea.se

Övertorneå Municipality (Swedish: Övertorneå kommun, Meänkieli: Matarengin kunta) is a municipality in Norrbotten County in northern Sweden, bordering Finland. Its seat is located in Övertorneå.

Until the Finnish War (1808–1809) Övertorneå and the Finnish Ylitornio were a single parish. Following the war, the eastern part of the municipality was ceded to Russia as a part of Finland. In 1870 a minor part of Övertorneå Municipality was split off, forming the rural municipality Korpilombolo (now part of Pajala Municipality). In 1969 Övertorneå and Hietaniemi municipalities were merged, forming the present municipality.

Many places in the municipality have both a Swedish and a Meänkieli name, one of the minority languages of Sweden.

== Localities ==
There are four localities (or urban areas) in Övertorneå Municipality:

#	Locality	Population
1	**Övertorneå**	1,965
2	Juoksengi	401
3	Hedenäset	285
4	Svanstein	207

The municipal seat in bold

=== Smaller localities ===
There are nine smaller localities in Övertorneå Municipality:

#	Smaller locality	Population
1	Pello	193
2	Kuivakangas	125
3	Aapua	122
4	Poikijärvi	107
5	Rantajärvi	102
6	Neistenkangas	93
7	Pudas	85
8	Haapakylä	59
9	Jänkisjärvi	52

== Demographics ==
This is a demographic table based on Övertorneå Municipality's electoral districts in the 2022 Swedish general election sourced from SVT's election platform, in turn taken from SCB official statistics.

In total there were 4,211 residents, including 3,187 Swedish citizens of voting age. 58.1% voted for the left coalition and 40.9% for the right coalition. The relatively high degree of people with foreign background by Norrbotten standards is a result of cross-border connections with Finland. Indicators are in percentage points except population totals and income.

Location	Residents	Citizen adults	Left vote	Right vote	Employed	Swedish parents	Foreign heritage	Income SEK	Degree
Location			%	%					
Hedenäset	663	521	57.4	41.2	75	73	27	19,797	32
Kuivakangas	866	708	53.9	45.5	84	79	21	23,191	30
Svanstein	787	625	65.0	34.8	79	79	21	20,617	34
Övertorneå	1,895	1,333	58.4	40.0	76	62	38	21,491	27
Source: SVT

== Elections ==
=== Riksdag ===
These are the results of the elections to the Riksdag since the 1972 municipal reform. Norrbotten Party also contested the 1994 election but due to the party's small size at a nationwide level SCB did not publish the party's results at a municipal level. The same applies to the Sweden Democrats between 1988 and 1998. "Turnout" denotes the percentage of eligible voters casting any ballots, whereas "Votes" denotes the number of actual valid ballots cast.

Year	Turnout	Votes	V	S	MP	C	L	KD	M	SD	ND	NP/SP
1973	89.4	4,174	13.8	43.3	0.0	31.1	2.0	1.0	7.7	0.0	0.0	0.0
1976	91.1	4,186	13.5	44.3	0.0	29.7	2.6	1.2	8.1	0.0	0.0	0.0
1979	91.2	4,147	11.7	45.0	0.0	27.1	3.0	1.5	8.8	0.0	0.0	0.0
1982	89.9	4,059	10.8	50.1	0.6	23.5	1.8	1.7	9.8	0.0	0.0	0.0
1985	88.0	3,950	11.8	49.8	0.3	23.1	4.6	0.0	10.3	0.0	0.0	0.0
1988	83.8	3,617	10.9	48.6	2.1	20.2	5.1	2.5	9.2	0.0	0.0	0.0
1991	83.0	3,536	10.1	46.9	1.2	19.8	4.0	4.4	10.6	0.0	2.9	0.0
1994	84.3	3,628	12.2	52.6	1.9	16.2	2.4	2.8	9.7	0.0	0.3	0.0
1998	80.5	3,357	22.0	39.6	2.7	11.6	1.4	8.3	12.7	0.0	0.0	0.0
2002	74.7	2,929	12.8	36.8	3.0	11.7	2.6	6.1	6.3	0.1	0.0	20.1
2006	74.9	2,785	11.7	43.9	2.7	14.9	3.2	4.6	12.7	1.0	0.0	4.2
2010	80.7	2,901	10.5	52.2	2.6	11.4	2.8	3.4	13.5	3.4	0.0	0.0
2014	80.5	2,733	10.1	47.6	2.8	11.1	2.2	3.6	10.7	11.0	0.0	0.0

Blocs

This lists the relative strength of the socialist and centre-right blocs since 1973, but parties not elected to the Riksdag are inserted as "other", including the Sweden Democrats results from 1988 to 2006, but also the Christian Democrats pre-1991 and the Greens in 1982, 1985 and 1991. The sources are identical to the table above. The coalition or government mandate marked in bold formed the government after the election. New Democracy got elected in 1991 but are still listed as "other" due to the short lifespan of the party.

Year	Turnout	Votes	Left	Right	SD	Other	Elected
1973	89.4	4,174	**57.1**	40.8	0.0	2.1	97.9
1976	91.1	4,186	57.8	**40.4**	0.0	1.9	98.1
1979	91.2	4,147	56.7	**38.9**	0.0	4.4	95.6
1982	89.9	4,059	**60.9**	35.1	0.0	4.0	96.0
1985	88.0	3,950	**61.6**	38.0	0.0	0.4	99.6
1988	83.8	3,617	**61.6**	34.5	0.0	3.9	96.1
1991	83.0	3,536	57.0	**38.8**	0.0	4.2	98.7
1994	84.3	3,628	**66.7**	31.1	0.0	2.2	97.8
1998	80.5	3,357	**64.3**	34.0	0.0	1.7	98.3
2002	74.7	2,929	**52.6**	26.7	0.0	21.7	78.3
2006	74.9	2,785	58.3	**35.4**	0.0	6.3	93.7
2010	80.7	2,901	65.3	**31.1**	3.4	0.2	99.8
2014	80.5	2,733	**60.5**	27.6	11.0	0.9	99.1

== Sights ==
Two old wooden churches in Övertorneå and Hedenäset. The church in Övertorneå has an organ from the 17th century.

Juoksengi is intersected by the Arctic Circle and is known as the "Arctic Circle Village" (Polcirkelbyn).
