= Raanu =

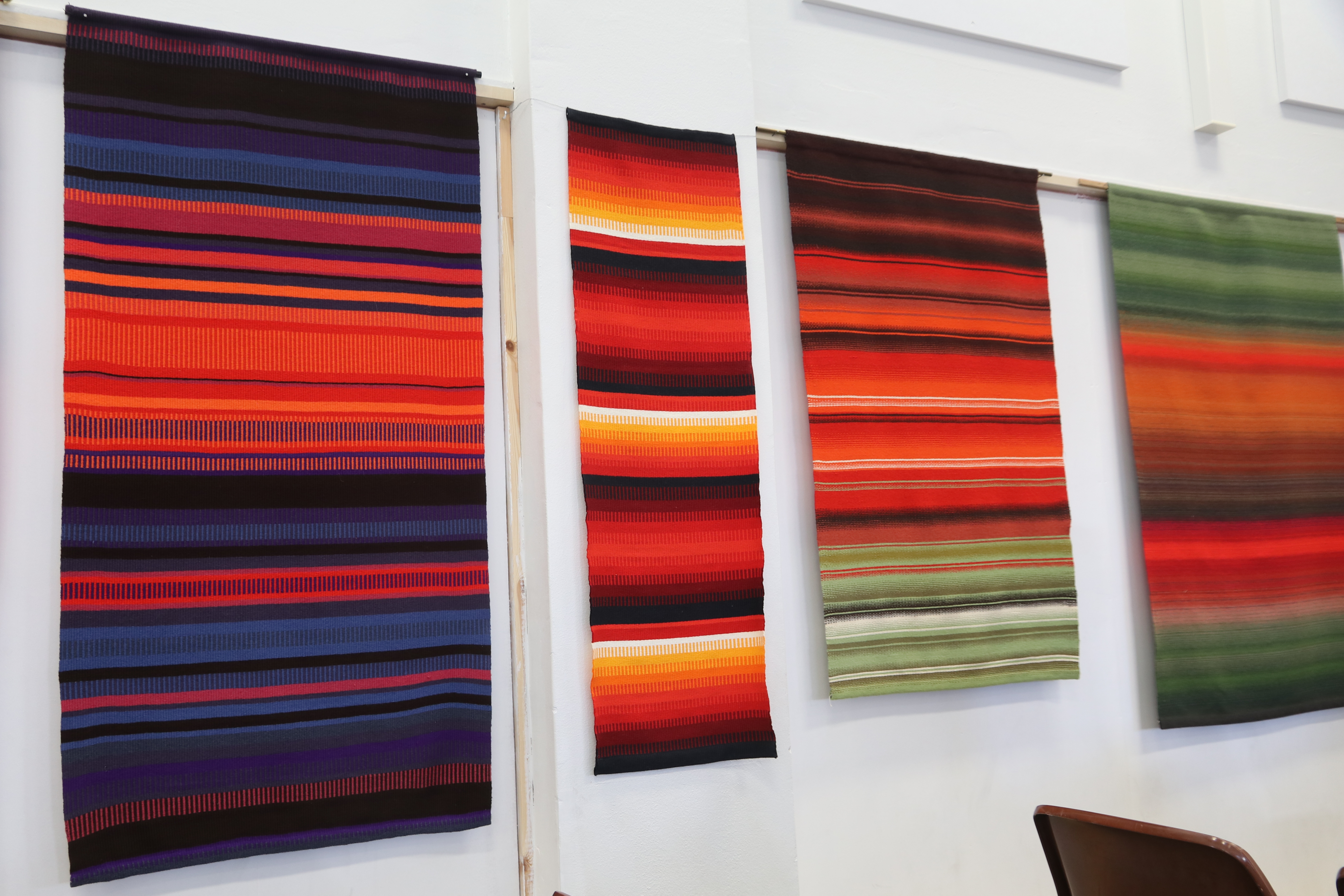
Raanu.

Raanu (Finnish) or rátnu (Northern Sámi) is a traditional Finnish and Sámi woven rug used as bed coverings and wall tapestries.

Traditionally they are flat weft-faced weave. The specific definition of raanu where it has one layer with a warp and weft, and another additional layer of weft for making geometric patterns, was defined by Uuno Taavi Sirelius. The warp is made of linen or cotton yarn, the first weft of linen, cotton or woollen yarn, and the second weft of woollen yarn.

Dialectical Finnish words for the raanu include silmikko, tapeeti, täpätti, väskööti and väskytinvaate. In Rear Bothnia, in order to save wool, the style of the Rear Bothnian half-piled rug (Finnish: Peräpohjolan puolinukkaraanu) was invented by utilizing tufting.
