= Torne Valley =

Valley at the border of Sweden and Finland

Coordinates: 66°30′N 23°45′E

Traditional location of Torne Valley in Norrbotten County (Sweden) and Finnish Lapland

Torne Valley (Finnish: Tornionlaakso, Torniojokilaakso; Swedish: Tornedalen), Torne River Valley or sometimes Meänmaa (Meänkieli for 'Our Land'), lies at the border of Sweden and Finland. It is named after the Torne River flowing through the valley and into the Gulf of Bothnia. Geographically the townships and municipalities that make up the area are Haparanda, Övertorneå, Pajala and Kiruna in Sweden, and Tornio, Ylitornio, Pello, Kolari, Muonio and Enontekiö in Finland. Culturally the highland Swedish municipality Gällivare is also considered part of Torne Valley (Meänmaa) due to the large share of Meänkieli-speaking population in it.

Meänkieli surnames and village names are common on the Swedish side of the border to this day, in spite of the dominance of the Swedish language in the area. The Finnish side of the border has standard Finnish as the sole official language.

== History and culture ==
Flag of Tornedalians

The cultural environment around the Torne River is characterized by agriculture, reindeer farming and fishing. Torne Valley was one of the oldest inhabited areas in northern Finland. Archeological excavations have revealed evidence of permanent settlements at least from the 11th century, but there are signs of earlier settlements. Agriculture has long been practiced on the fertile flooding meadows by the river. Trading routes followed the river and some trading centers were formed. One of the centers since 16th century was the island Oravaisensaari at Vojakkala. Today, the main center is the twin city of Haparanda-Tornio.

The Finnish and Swedish sides of the river were once one cultural entity, as before 1809 they were both parts of Sweden. Once the current border between the two countries had been established, each side of the river has become influenced by the majority culture in its respective country, but still retains some traditional elements.

== Language ==
On the Swedish side of the valley, Finnish was still the majority language until the 20th century. This is obvious in the many Finnish village and other place names on the Swedish side of the border. The number of Finnish speakers has now declined drastically, because of national Swedish influence and compulsory schooling in Swedish. People in the younger generations mostly have Swedish as their primary language, though it is still widely spoken in many homes as a secondary language.

The local Finnic variant, Meänkieli, has been recognised as a minority language in Sweden. The people who speak it are often referred to as Tornedalians, although this term could also be defined as referring to people living in Torne Valley, who are not all speakers of Meänkieli. The originally Finnish-speaking land area is far greater than the actual river valley; it extends as far west as Gällivare. Although confusing from a geographic point of view, this whole area is often referred to as Torne Valley (Meänmaa). Torne Valley, Sápmi and Swedish areas bind together, most places in Norrbottens län have three names, but are mostly called by their Swedish name which often just has a different spelling. For example Kiruna is called Kieruna (Meänkieli), Giron (North Sámi), and Kiruna (Swedish), but is mainly known as Kiruna.

The area where Meänkieli is spoken is also called Meänmaa. Since 15 June 2006, the Tornedalians have their own flag.

== See also ==
- French Geodesic Mission to Lapland
- Meänmaa Flag Day
