= Bengt Pohjanen =

Swedish Tornedalian author, priest and activist

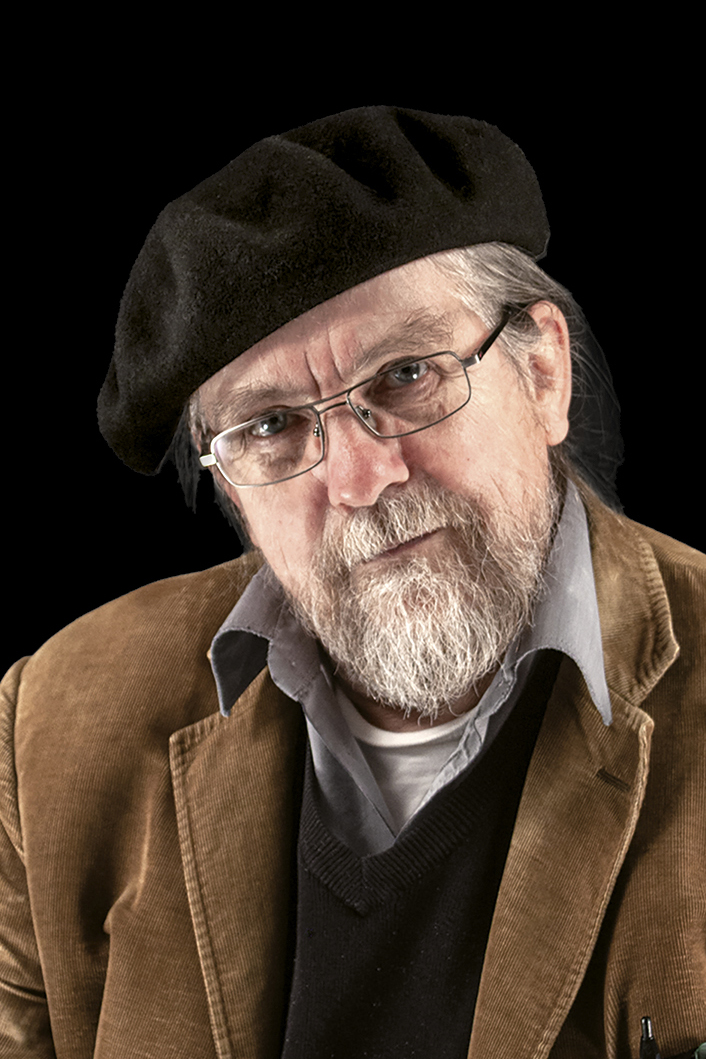
- Bengt Pohjanen (2020)
- Born: 26 June 1944 (age 82); Kassa, Pajala, Norrbotten, Sweden
- Education: Literature science
- Occupations: author, translator, literature scientist, Orthodox Christian priest
- Website: www.sirillus.se

Bengt Erik Benedictus Pohjanen (born 26 June 1944 in Kassa in Pajala, Norrbotten, Sweden), is a Swedish author, translator and priest living in Överkalix. He belongs to the Finnic Meänkieli-speaking Tornedalian minority. Pohjanen has worked on the development of the literary language and grammar of Meänkieli; he has published Meänkieli-language writings and translations. He also writes in Finnish and Swedish.

Pohjanen won the Rubus arcticus in 1995 and the Eyvind Johnson literature prize in 2010.
