= Meänkieli =

Finnic language or Finnish dialect spoken in northern Sweden

- Tornedalian
- meänkieli
- Native to: Sweden
- Region: Torne Valley, Kalix, Luleå, Umeå, Stockholm
- Ethnicity: Tornedalians
- Native speakers: 20,000 to 75,000
- Language family: Uralic: Finnic; Finnish; Peräpohjola; Meänkieli
- Dialects: Torne Valley dialects; Gällivare dialects; Lannankieli

Official status
- Recognised minority language in: Sweden

Language codes
- ISO 639-3: fit
- Glottolog: torn1244
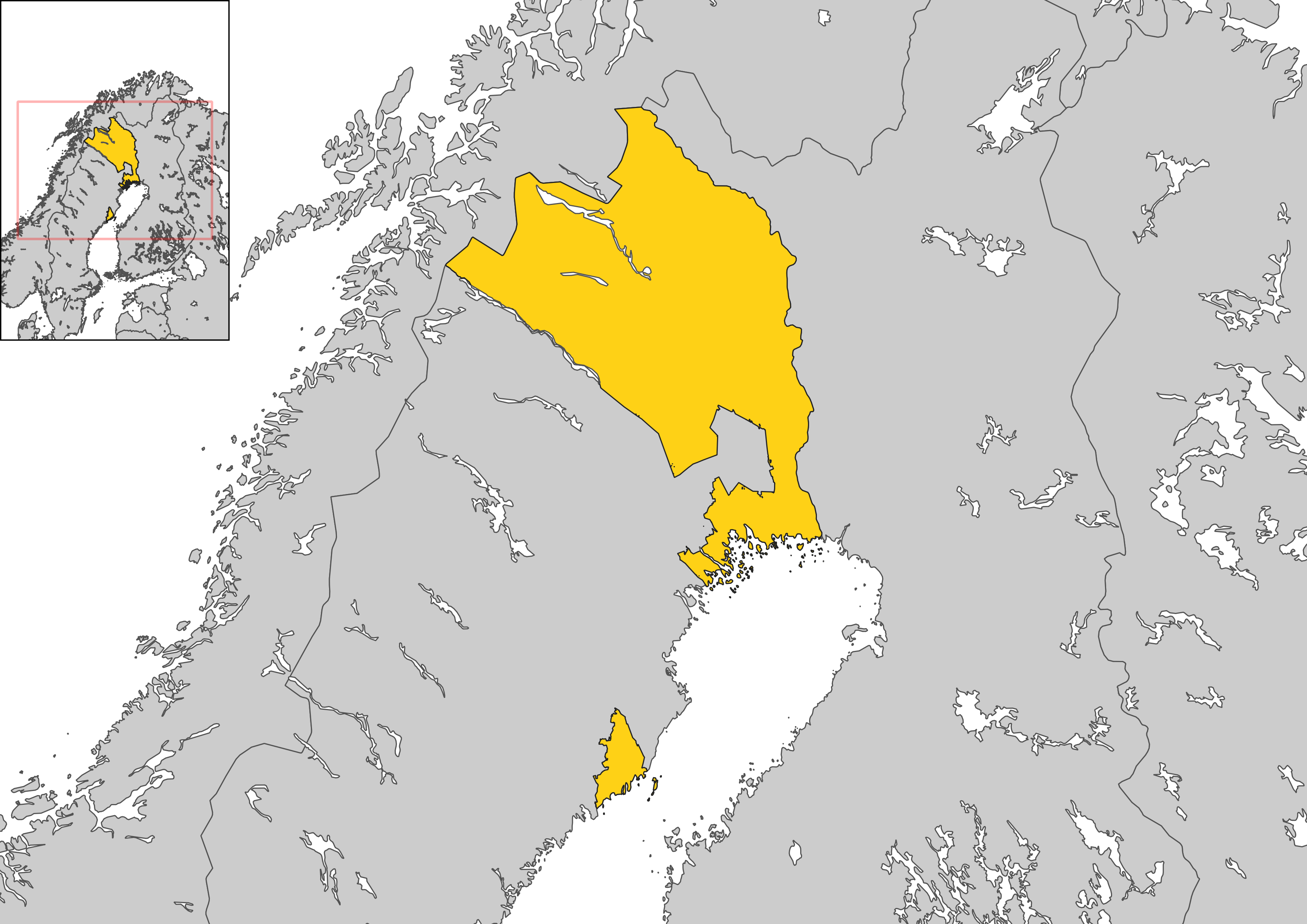
- Map of the area where Meänkieli has an official status.

- Meänkieli is classified as Vulnerable by the University of Lapland Arctic Centre, University of Lapland

Meänkieli (lit. 'our language'), also known as Tornedalian, is a Finnic language or a group of distinct Finnish dialects spoken in the northernmost part of Sweden, particularly along the Torne River Valley (Meänmaa). It is officially recognized in Sweden as one of the country's five minority languages and is treated as a separate language from Finnish. According to the National Association of Swedish Tornedalians, 70,000 individuals understand Meänkieli, at least to some level. While most fluent speakers are aged 65 or older, there has been a significant increase in the last decade of pupils in Sweden learning Meänkieli.

Meänkieli is spoken by the Tornedalians in Sweden, who are descended from a mixture of old Tavastian and Old Karelian speakers who began settling formerly Sámi speaking regions in the Torne Valley region. Meänkieli is particularly similar to the Kven language in Norway and the Peräpohjola dialects of Finnish spoken in Finland, and it is strongly mutually intelligible with them. Its status as an independent language is sometimes disputed due to this high degree of mutual intelligibility. However, Meänkieli contains strong influences from Swedish, a number of loanwords from the Sámi languages, preserves some archaic features that even the northern Finnish dialects have lost, and lacks the changes which standard Finnish experienced in the 19th to 20th centuries. As a result, while Meänkieli is often intelligible to speakers of Finnish, standard Finnish is often very difficult for speakers of Meänkieli to understand. The Gällivare varieties of Meänkieli differ even more significantly from standard Finnish and from other Finnish dialects, notably particularly their complete absence of vowel harmony.

A written Meänkieli language has been developed since the 1970s.

== History ==
=== Early history ===
The indigenous population of the regions where the Tornedalians currently live were the Sámi. The first Finnic people of the region were Tavastians, who had been making expeditions into the region since the 9th century. Examples of Tavastian toponyms include the names Tornio and Kemi. After the Tavastians, a number of Old Karelian speakers also migrated to the area, from whom toponyms such as Seittenkaari were derived. In the 15th century, Finnic settlements became established as far as Pello. North of Pello, the population still consisted mainly of Sámi. In the 17th century, Finnic speakers began to spread beyond this boundary, and by the 18th century Finnic settlements had emerged in places such as Vittangi and Jukkasjärvi. In the late 17th century, Finnic speakers also arrived in the Gällivare area.

=== Treaty of Fredrikshamn ===
Before 1809, all of what is today Finland was an integral part of Sweden. The language border went west of the Torne Valley area, so the upper section of today's Sweden (about 10% by area), was historically Finnish speaking (just like most areas along the eastern coast of the southern part of Gulf of Bothnia, areas that were ceded to Russia and are part of modern Finland, were historically Swedish speaking, and to a large extent still are). The area where Meänkieli is spoken that is now northern Sweden (apart from the linguistically Sami and Swedish parts of this geographical area), formed a dialect continuum within the Realm of Sweden. Since the area east of Torne River was ceded to Russia in 1809, the language spoken on the western side of it developed in partial isolation from standard Finnish. In 1826, the state Church of Sweden appointed the priest and amateur botanist Lars Levi Laestadius to be the Vicar over the Karesuando parish, which is situated along the Muonio River north of the Arctic Circle on the border of Finland in Swedish Lapland.

In the 1880s, the Swedish state decided that all citizens of the country should speak Swedish. Part of the reason was military; people close to the border speaking the language of the neighbouring country rather than the major language in their own country might not be trusted in case of war. Another reason was that Finns were sometimes regarded as being of another "race." An opinion of that period, as reflected in contemporary fiction, was that the Sami and the Finnish populations belonged "more closely to Russia than to Scandinavia". Beginning around this time, the schools in the area only taught in Swedish, and children were forbidden under penalty of physical punishment from speaking their own language at school even during class breaks. Native Finnish speakers were prevented by the authorities from learning Standard Finnish as a school subject for decades, which resulted in the survival of the language only in oral form.

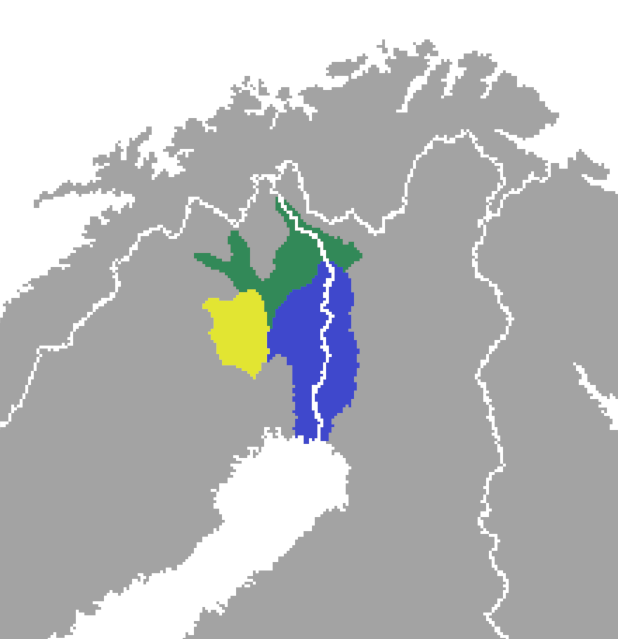
Traditional spread of the Western Peräpohja variants in both Sweden and Finland. The Torne-Valley dialects are in blue, Lannankieli in green and Gällivare dialects in yellow.

When minority languages first became taught in Swedish schools, Meänkieli was still classified by Sweden as a form of Finnish and children who spoke it natively were taught the standard Finnish literary language in school instead of their more native Tornedalian variant, causing the students to become demotivated. However, in 1977 some schools began to make materials specifically designed for speakers of Meänkieli which did not use standard Finnish. This was also the first time the term "Meänkieli" was applied to the form of speech, which was called "Tornedalian Finnish" before.

=== Meänkieli today ===
On April 1, 2000, Meänkieli became one of the now five nationally recognized minority languages of Sweden, which means it can be used for some communication with local and regional authorities in the communities along the Finnish border. Its minority language status applies in designated local communities and areas, not throughout Sweden.

Few people today speak Meänkieli as their only language, with speakers usually knowing Swedish and often standard Finnish as well. Estimates of how many people speak Meänkieli vary from 30,000 to 70,000, of whom most live in Norrbotten. Many people in the northern parts of Sweden understand some Meänkieli, but fewer people speak it regularly. People with Meänkieli roots are often referred to as Tornedalians although the Finnish-speaking part of Norrbotten is a far larger area than the Torne River Valley; the Meänkieli-speaking part of Norrbotten stretches as far west as Gällivare municipality.

Today Meänkieli is declining. Few young people speak Meänkieli as part of daily life though many have passive knowledge of the language from family use, and it is not uncommon for younger people from Meänkieli-speaking families to be more familiar with standard Finnish, for which literature and courses are much more readily available. The language is taught at Stockholm University, Luleå University of Technology, Umeå University, and Babeș-Boylai University in Romania. In 2020, Oulu University began teaching translators in Meänkieli and Kven. Bengt Pohjanen is a trilingual author from the Torne Valley. In 1985 he wrote the first Meänkieli novel, Lyykeri. He has also written several novels, dramas, grammar books, songs and films in Meänkieli.

The author Mikael Niemi's novels and a film based on one of his books in Swedish have improved awareness of this minority among Swedes. Since the 1980s, people who speak Meänkieli have become more aware of the importance of the language as a marker of identity. Today there are grammar books, a Bible translation, drama performances, and there are some TV programmes in Meänkieli.

On radio, programmes in Meänkieli are broadcast regularly from regional station P4 Norrbotten (as well as local station P6 in Stockholm) on Mondays to Thursdays between 17:10 and 18:00, while on Sundays further programmes are carried by P6 between 8:34 and 10:00 (also on P2 nationwide from 8:34 to 9:00). All of these programmes are also available via the Internet.

== Status as a language ==
Individuals who support the classification of Meänkieli as a separate language generally do so for historical, political and sociological reasons. They often point to its separate history, cultural significance, official status, and its standardised written language which differs from Standard Finnish. According to Harri Mantila, a professor at the University of Oulu, the recognition as an independent language is important to many of the speakers. It has increased the linguistic prestige of Meänkieli which has been historically very low due to the process of Swedification, thus helping to strengthen the cultural identity for the Tornedalians.

On linguistic grounds, Meänkieli may be classified as a group of Northern Peräpohjola dialects of Finnish, traditionally spoken on the Finnish side of the Torne River. The establishment of the 1809 border led Meänkieli to evolve separately, resulting in increased Swedish influence and the preservation of some archaic features. Swedish has influenced the syntax and the phonetics of Meänkieli, and code-switching between Meänkieli and Swedish is common among its speakers. The language also includes many Swedish loan words. Despite these differences, Meänkieli remains largely intelligible to Finnish speakers, partially due to the fact that Swedish is a mandatory subject in Finnish schools, making the heavy Swedish elements in Meänkieli less of a barrier for comprehension.

One key distinction between Meänkieli speakers and native Finnish speakers is their use of linguistic registers. Native Finns typically alternate between a spoken dialect and the standardised written form of Finnish, which is taught in schools. In contrast, during the period of minority language suppression in Swedish schools, Meänkieli was confined in private use, and its speakers did not learn Standard Finnish. In addition, Standard Finnish has developed thousands of neologisms to replace foreign words—many of which are unintelligible to Meänkieli speakers. When Finnish-language education resumed in the early 1970s, it became clear that students struggled with materials written in Standard Finnish. Learning outcomes began to improve only when after instruction began to be delivered in local dialects and efforts to develop a written language were initiated. As of 2010, the written standard was still under development and had not yet gained widespread recognition.

== Dialects ==
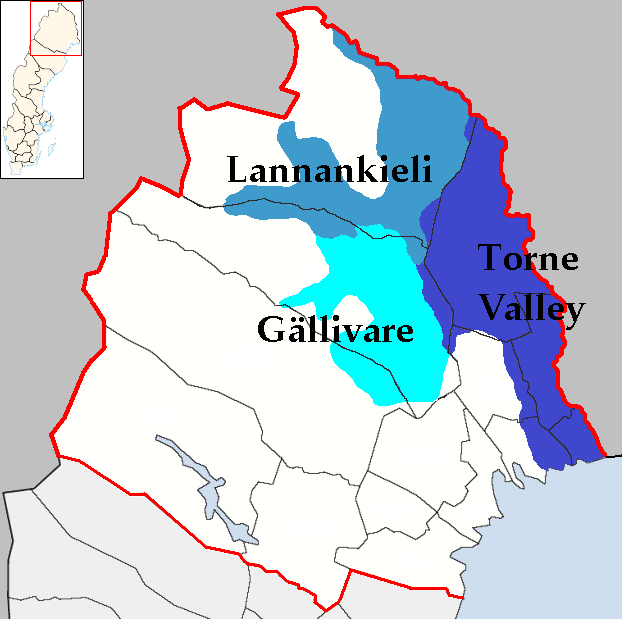
Traditional spread of the Meänkieli variants

In Sweden, Meänkieli consists of three dialect subgroups, the Torne Valley dialects (spoken in Pajala, Övertorneå, Haparanda and parts of Kiruna), Lannankieli (spoken in Kiruna municipality) and the Gällivare dialects (spoken in Gällivare municipality), which all descend from the larger Peräpohjola dialect group. The Torne Valley dialects are the most major variant group of Meänkieli, and the written standard language of Meänkieli is primarily derived from the Torne Valley dialects spoken in Pajala and Övertorneå. However, the Lannankieli and Gällivare variants are more severely endangered. All three dialect groups are mutually intelligible with each other, however they contain some lexical differences.

- Meänkieli dialects
  - Torne Valley dialects
    - Haparanda dialect
    - Pajala dialect
    - Övertorneå dialect
  - Gällivare dialects
    - Southwestern Gällivare dialect
    - Middle Gällivare dialect
    - Northwestern Gällivare dialect
    - Eastern Gällivare dialect
  - Lannankieli
    - Jukkasjärvi dialect
    - Vittangi dialect
    - Kaalasvuoma dialect
    - Karesuando dialect

== Geographical distribution ==
Meänkieli has an official status in: Pajala, Övertorneå, Haparanda, Gällivare, Luleå, Kalix, Kiruna, Umeå and Stockholm. Meänkieli has also been historically spoken in Piteå, Boden, Älvsbyn and northeastern Jokkmokk municipality.

== Grammar ==
The grammar of Meänkieli is very similar to Finnish, with some variations such as the aspiration of consonants before long vowels. Meänkieli is an agglutinative language with eleven noun cases. It contains consonant gradation and vowel harmony, just like Finnish. It contains four verb tenses, which are the present, imperfect, perfect and the pluperfect. It does not have a separate tense for future events.

== Phonology and alphabet ==
Vowel and consonant length is indicated by doubling the letter, e.g. ⟨öö⟩ /ø:/ and ⟨hh⟩ /h:/.

| | Front | | Back | |
| | Unrounded | Rounded | Unrounded | Rounded |
|---|---|---|---|---|
| Close | i iː | y yː | | u uː |
| Mid | e eː | ø øː | | o oː |
| Open | æ æː | | ɑ ɑː | |

| | Labial | Alveolar | Postalveolar | Palatal | Velar | Glottal |
|---|---|---|---|---|---|---|
| Nasal | m | n | | | ŋ | |
| Plosive | p~b | t~d | | | k~g | |
| Fricative | f | s | ʃ ⟨š⟩ | | | h |
| Trill | | r | | | | |
| Approximant | ʋ ⟨v⟩ | l | | j | | |

- A – aa – [ɑ]
- B – bee – [b]
- C – see – [k/s]
- D – dee – [d]
- E – ee – [e]
- F – äf – [f]
- G – gee – [ɡ]
- H – hoo – [h]
- I – ii – [i]
- J – jii – [j]
- K – koo – [k]
- L – äl – [l]
- M – äm – [m]
- N – än – [n]
- O – oo – [o]
- P – pee – [p]
- Q – kuu – [k]
- R – är – [r]
- S – äs – [s]
- T – tee – [t]
- U – uu – [u]
- V – vee – [ʋ]
- W – kaksois-vee/tupla-vee – [ʋ]
- X – äks – [ks]
- Y – yy – [y]
- Z – tset(a) – [s]
- Å – ruotti oo – [o/oː]
- Ä – ää – [æ]
- Ö – öö – [ø]

B, C, D, G, Q, W, X, Z, and Å are only used in foreign words and names.

in 2016 a letter Š /ʃ/ was added into Meänkieli, instead of the Swedish letters sj.

== Differences between standard Finnish and Meänkieli ==
1) There exists often either the omission of the d sound (in native words) or its replacement with t (in loanwords):

- tehä 'to do' (standard Finnish: tehdä)
- tynamiitti 'dynamite' (standard Finnish: dynamiitti)
- syyä 'to eat' (standard Finnish: syödä,)
- meän 'our' (standard Finnish: meidän,)
- teän 'your' (standard Finnish: teidän)
- heän 'their' (standard Finnish: heidän)
- soan 'of the war' (standard Finnish: sodan)

2) In certain environments, gemination (doubling of consonants) occurs, which differs from standard Finnish:

Instead of ts clusters, there is tt (similar to western Finnish dialects):

- mettä 'forest' (standard Finnish: metsä)
- kattoa 'to look' (standard Finnish: katsoa)

Some consonant clusters have assimilated into geminates:

jokka 'who' (standard Finnish: jotka)

Meänkieli often has the geminate vv:

- savvu 'smoke' (Finnish: savu)
- avvain 'key' (standard Finnish: avain)

3) Verb conjugation endings: -mma ~ -mmä, -tta ~ -ttä, -pi

- menemmä 'we go' (standard Finnish: menemme)
- tuletta 'you come' (standard Finnish: tulette)
- ostaapi 'buys' (standard Finnish: ostaa)
- syövä 'they eat' (standard Finnish: syövät)

4) Past participle:

The standard Finnish syönyt (pronounced, syöny or syönny) form corresponds to syönny in Meänkieli (not present in all dialects).

5) In certain loanwords, Meänkieli has the sound y under the influence of Swedish, while Finnish uses the sound u:

- kylttyyri = 'culture' (Finnish: kulttuuri)
- mysiikki = 'music' (Finnish: musiikki)
- resyrssi = 'resource' (Finnish: resurssi)

6) In loanwords, Meänkieli has preserved the f sound, whereas in Finnish it has often become v:

- färi 'color' (standard Finnish: väri)
- fankila 'prison' (Finnish: vankila)
- fati 'bowl' (standard Finnish: vati)
- fiuletti 'violet' (standard Finnish: violetti)

7) In recent loanwords, Meänkieli often uses the sound u under the influence of Swedish, while Finnish uses the sound o:

- puliisi 'police' (Finnish: poliisi)
- muterni 'modern' (Finnish: moderni)
- pulitiikki 'politics' (Finnish: politiikka)
- pulitiikkeri 'politician' (Finnish: poliitikko)
- vukaali 'vowel' (Finnish: vokaali)
- pusitiivinen 'positive' (Finnish: positiivinen)

8) The verb olla (to be) is sometimes combined with personal pronouns in the spoken form of Meänkieli:

- Molen = I am (standard Finnish: olen)
- Solet = you are (standard Finnish: olet)
- Son = it is, he/she is (standard Finnish: hän on)
- Sole = it is not (standard Finnish: se ei ole)
- Molema = we are (standard Finnish: me olemme)
- Toletta = you (plural) are (standard Finnish: te olette)
- Non/Noova/Hoova = they are (standard Finnish: he ovat)

9) Meänkieli often uses the ending -tten in plural genitives:

- kaloitten 'of the fish' (Finnish: kalojen)
- miehitten 'of the men' (Finnish: miesten)
- taloitten 'of the houses' (Finnish: talojen)
- asunnoitten 'of the apartments' (Finnish: asuntojen)

10) Personal pronouns.

Personal pronouns in Meänkieli somewhat differ from those used in standard Finnish:

| | Meänkieli | Finnish | Colloquial Finnish |
|---|---|---|---|
| 1st person singular | mie | minä | mä/mie |
| 2nd person singular | sie | sinä | sä/sie |
| 3rd person singular | hään/se | hän/se | se |
| 1st person plural | met | me | me |
| 2nd person plural | tet | te | te |
| 3rd person plural | het | he/ne | ne |

11) Meänkieli often uses the "š" sound in loanwords due to Swedish influence.

- šinkka = ham
- informašuuni = information
- lekitimašuuni = personal identification

12) Meänkieli uses -sti first personal possessive instead of the Finnish -si ending.

- piilisti = your car (standard Finnish: autosi)
- pappasti = your father (standard Finnish: isäsi)
- talhoosti = into your house (standard Finnish; taloosi)

=== Gällivare dialects ===
The Gällivare dialects contain multiple further differences from standard Finnish, that make it unique among the variants of Meänkieli. The Gällivare dialects often differ very radically from standard Finnish in many ways. For instance, the Gällivare dialects completely lack vowel harmony, which is seen in words such as kyla 'village', päiva 'day' and näkkuu 'is seen', which in standard Finnish are kylä, päivä and näkyy. The Gällivare dialect also contains many triphthongs, such as syöi 'ate', juoi 'drank', viei 'took', which in standard Finnish are söi, joi and vei. Gällivare also uses the passive form of verbs in the third person plural, thus the Gällivare sentence tyttäret juoshin 'the daughters ran', in standard Finnish is tytöt juoksivat.

== Meänkieli vocabulary not found in Finnish ==
The Swedish language words are in parentheses in case of borrowed cognates. With Swedish being the dominant everyday language in the region, the language has impacted modern Meänkieli in some ways. Meänkieli also contains many words which have different meanings in Finnish and Meänkieli, yet sound similar. An example is the word "pyörtyä", which means 'to get lost' in Meänkieli, but it refers to fainting in standard Finnish. It should, however, be noted that most of the word listed below are found in Finnish dialects.

- äpyli 'apple' (äpple)
- son/s'oon 'it is'
- sole 'it is not'
- klaarata 'to get along' (klara)
- sturaani 'ugly' (used in Gällivare)
- potati 'potato' (potatis)
- pruukata 'to have a habit of' (bruka)
- följy 'along with, company' (följe)
- ko 'when, as, since'
- fiskata 'to fish' (fiska)
- kläppi 'child'
- muuruutti 'carrot' (morot)
- porista 'to talk'
- praatata 'to speak' (prata)
- kahveli 'fork' (gaffel)
- pruuvata 'to try' (prova)
- kniivi 'knife' (kniv)
- knakata 'to knock' (knacka)
- öölata 'to drink beer' (öla)
- miilu 'merrills'
- knapsu 'feminine man'
- fruukosti 'breakfast' (frukost)
- fältti 'field' (fält)
- hunteerata 'to think, ponder' (fundera)
- engelska 'English' (engelska)
- fryysbuksi 'freezer' (frysbox)
- flaku 'flag' (flagga)
- häätyy 'to have to'
- raavastua 'to mature'

== Examples ==
This example is taken from the Swedish Institute for Language and Folklore:

| Meänkieli | Finnish | Swedish | English |
|---|---|---|---|
| Olipa kerran pikku piika joka oli saanu fiinin punasen lyyvan hänen siivolta mummulta. Siksi piikaa kututhiin Rödlyyvaksi. Yhtenä päivänä Rödlyyvan äiti käski hänen mennä mummun tykö, ko mummu makasi saihraana hänen pienessä mökissä pimeässä synkässä mettässä. Rödlyyva sai ruokakorin ja lääkheet matkhaan ja äiti muistutti tyärtä ette marsia suoraa tietä mummun tykö eikä topata välilä praatimhaan kenenkhän kans. | Olipa kerran pieni tyttö joka oli saanut hienon punaisen hilkan kiltiltä mummoltaan. Siksi tyttöä kutsuttiin Punahilkaksi. Yhtenä päivänä Punahilkan äiti käski hänen mennä mummon luokse, koska mummo makasi sairaana pienessä mökissään pimeässä synkässä metsässä. Punahilkka sai ruokakorin ja lääkkeet mukaansa ja äiti muistutti tytärtä, että kulkee suoraa tietä mummon luokse eikä pysähdy välillä puhumaan kenenkään kanssa. | Det var en gång en liten flicka, som hade fått en fin röd huva av sin snälla mormor. Därför kallades flickan Rödluvan. En dag bad mamman att flickan skulle gå till mormor, som låg sjuk i sin stuga djupt inne i skogen. Flickan fick en korg med mat och medicin att ta med. Mamma förmanade flickan att gå raka vägen till mormor och inte stanna och prata med någon på vägen. | Once upon a time, there was a little girl who had received a beautiful red hood from her kind grandmother. That’s why the girl was called Little Red Riding Hood. One day, the girl's mother asked her to go to her grandmother, who was sick in her cottage deep in the forest. Little Red Riding Hood was given a basket with food and medicine to take with her. Mother warned the girl to go straight to grandmother's and not stop to talk to anyone along the way. |

Example of the Gällivare dialects of Meänkieli taken from the Institute for the Languages of Finland:

| Gällivare | Standard Finnish | English |
|---|---|---|
| joo, ja se oŋ kantanu kerran sataneliʲäkymmentä kilua Jällivaarasta Killiim, silloŋ ku se rautatier rakennus tuli Klasiloovaan. Se omp vielä rekorttimpi. Ov vahva mies. Joo, soli hyviv vahva mies, mut lyhu. hyvim pitkä selkä ja lyhuj jalat. | Joo, ja hän on kerran kantanut sata neljäkymmentä kiloa Jällivaarasta Killiin, silloin kun rautatierakkens tuli Klasiloovaan. Se on vieläkin kovempi ennätys. On vahva mies. Joo, hän oli hyvin vahva mies, mutta lyhyt. Hyvin pitkä selkä ja lyhyet jalat. | Yeah, and he once carried one hundred and forty kilos from Gällivare to Killi, when the railway came to Klasiloova. It’s an even bigger record. (He) is a strong man. Yeah, he was a very strong man, but short. A very long back and short legs. |

== See also ==
- Demographics of Sweden
- Kven language
- Sweden Finns
- Virsiä Meänkielelä
