= Veli-Pekka Lehtola =

North Sámi historian and academic

Veli-Pekka Lehtola is a North Sámi historian and academic. He is professor of Sámi culture at the Giellagas Institute of the University of Oulu, Finland. He is known for his research in Sami culture. He is also politically active, promoting a narrow definition of Sámi groups towards the Finnish government.
