= Vittangi =

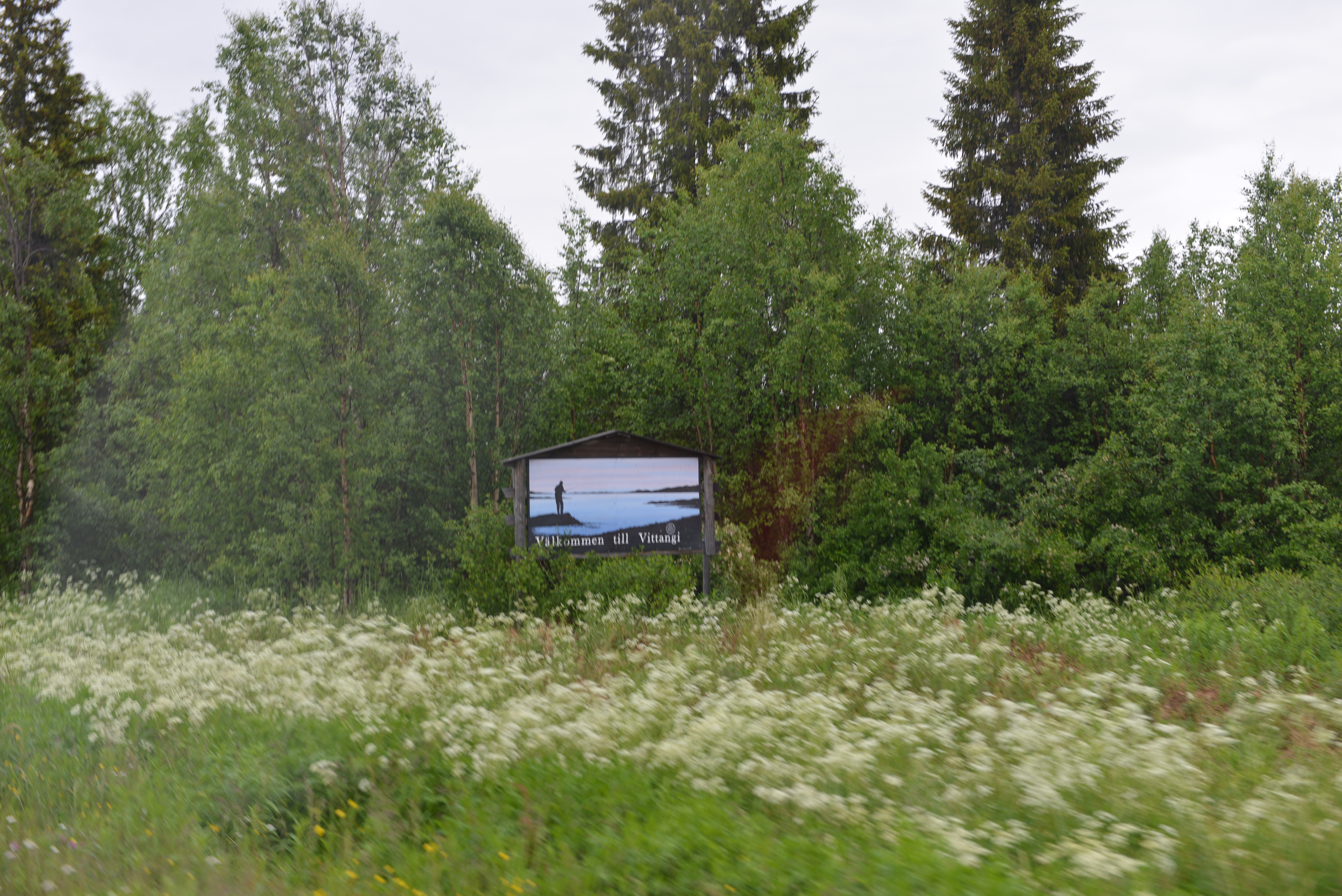
- Vittangi welcome sign in July 2015

- Location within Norrbotten Location within Sweden
- Coordinates: 67°40′N 21°38′E
- Country: Sweden
- Province: Lapland
- County: Norrbotten County
- Municipality: Kiruna Municipality

Area
  - Total: 2.27 km^{2} (0.88 sq mi)

Population (31 December 2010)
  - Total: 784
  - Density: 346/km^{2} (900/sq mi)
- Time zone: UTC+1 (CET)
  - Summer (DST): UTC+2 (CEST)

Vittangi (Swedish pronunciation: [ˈvɪ̌tːaŋɡɪ]; Meänkieli: Vittanki; Northern Sámi: Vazáš) is a locality situated in Kiruna Municipality, Norrbotten County, Sweden with 784 inhabitants in 2010.

The village of Vittangi was founded in 1674 by Henrik Mickelsson Kyrö from Pello.

The locality is very notable because it houses a cluster of people exhibiting congenital insensitivity to pain.

In February 1985, Vittangi recorded the coldest month ever in Scandinavia, with a mean of −27.2 °C.

== Climate ==
Climate data for Vittangi, 1991-2020 normals and extremes
Month	Jan	Feb	Mar	Apr	May	Jun	Jul	Aug	Sep	Oct	Nov	Dec	Year
Record high °C (°F)	7.7 (45.9)	8.4 (47.1)	12.2 (54.0)	17.6 (63.7)	28.2 (82.8)	30.8 (87.4)	30.4 (86.7)	29.0 (84.2)	24.1 (75.4)	13.5 (56.3)	8.6 (47.5)	7.1 (44.8)	30.8 (87.4)
Mean maximum °C (°F)	1.8 (35.2)	3.4 (38.1)	7.1 (44.8)	11.8 (53.2)	20.6 (69.1)	24.8 (76.6)	26.2 (79.2)	24.5 (76.1)	18.7 (65.7)	10.1 (50.2)	3.8 (38.8)	3.1 (37.6)	27.7 (81.9)
Mean daily maximum °C (°F)	−9.3 (15.3)	−7.8 (18.0)	−1.5 (29.3)	4.3 (39.7)	10.5 (50.9)	16.8 (62.2)	19.8 (67.6)	17.2 (63.0)	11.3 (52.3)	2.6 (36.7)	−4.5 (23.9)	−7.1 (19.2)	4.1 (39.4)
Daily mean °C (°F)	−14.5 (5.9)	−13.6 (7.5)	−7.9 (17.8)	−0.9 (30.4)	5.6 (42.1)	11.4 (52.5)	14.3 (57.7)	11.9 (53.4)	6.4 (43.5)	−1.0 (30.2)	−8.5 (16.7)	−12.1 (10.2)	−0.7 (30.7)
Mean daily minimum °C (°F)	−20.2 (−4.4)	−19.6 (−3.3)	−14.8 (5.4)	−7.1 (19.2)	−0.1 (31.8)	5.8 (42.4)	8.7 (47.7)	6.5 (43.7)	1.6 (34.9)	−4.8 (23.4)	−12.8 (9.0)	−17.2 (1.0)	−6.4 (20.5)
Mean minimum °C (°F)	−35.6 (−32.1)	−34.9 (−30.8)	−30.4 (−22.7)	−20.6 (−5.1)	−7.0 (19.4)	−0.6 (30.9)	2.5 (36.5)	−1.3 (29.7)	−6.1 (21.0)	−17.3 (0.9)	−26.9 (−16.4)	−31.9 (−25.4)	−38.0 (−36.4)
Record low °C (°F)	−47.0 (−52.6)	−41.7 (−43.1)	−39.5 (−39.1)	−32.3 (−26.1)	−15.8 (3.6)	−2.9 (26.8)	−1.2 (29.8)	−4.3 (24.3)	−11.3 (11.7)	−27.2 (−17.0)	−36.8 (−34.2)	−39.8 (−39.6)	−47.0 (−52.6)
Average precipitation mm (inches)	30.8 (1.21)	25.3 (1.00)	22.1 (0.87)	24.5 (0.96)	42.0 (1.65)	65.2 (2.57)	89.0 (3.50)	68.5 (2.70)	51.0 (2.01)	39.0 (1.54)	35.3 (1.39)	34.7 (1.37)	527.4 (20.77)
Source 1: SMHI Open Data
Source 2: SMHI 1991-2020 normals

Climate data for Vittangi, mean 1961-1990, extremes 1961-2011
Month	Jan	Feb	Mar	Apr	May	Jun	Jul	Aug	Sep	Oct	Nov	Dec	Year
Record high °C (°F)	7.8 (46.0)	8.4 (47.1)	12.2 (54.0)	17.6 (63.7)	27.7 (81.9)	30.8 (87.4)	31.0 (87.8)	29.0 (84.2)	23.6 (74.5)	15.7 (60.3)	10.2 (50.4)	7.2 (45.0)	31.0 (87.8)
Mean daily maximum °C (°F)	−11.4 (11.5)	−9.4 (15.1)	−2.9 (26.8)	2.8 (37.0)	9.9 (49.8)	16.6 (61.9)	18.9 (66.0)	16.0 (60.8)	10.1 (50.2)	2.5 (36.5)	−5.2 (22.6)	−9.5 (14.9)	3.2 (37.8)
Daily mean °C (°F)	−17.3 (0.9)	−15.2 (4.6)	−9.4 (15.1)	−2.3 (27.9)	5.0 (41.0)	11.3 (52.3)	13.4 (56.1)	10.9 (51.6)	5.3 (41.5)	−1.2 (29.8)	−9.6 (14.7)	−15.1 (4.8)	−2.0 (28.4)
Mean daily minimum °C (°F)	−23.7 (−10.7)	−22.1 (−7.8)	−17.0 (1.4)	−8.5 (16.7)	−0.9 (30.4)	5.3 (41.5)	7.3 (45.1)	5.3 (41.5)	0.5 (32.9)	−5.4 (22.3)	−14.7 (5.5)	−21.3 (−6.3)	−7.9 (17.7)
Record low °C (°F)	−47.0 (−52.6)	−48.7 (−55.7)	−42.4 (−44.3)	−33.0 (−27.4)	−16.3 (2.7)	−5.2 (22.6)	−3.1 (26.4)	−5.6 (21.9)	−14.9 (5.2)	−29.2 (−20.6)	−37.1 (−34.8)	−42.6 (−44.7)	−48.7 (−55.7)
