= Pudas =

Pudas is a surname. Notable people with the surname include:

- Albert Pudas (1899–1976), Finnish-Canadian ice hockey player and coach
- Jonathan Pudas (born 1993), Swedish ice hockey player
- Rauli Pudas (born 1954), Finnish pole vaulter
- Mark Pudas (born 1985), American Singer/Songwriter Aka “Mark Andrew” Season 4 The Voice contestant and season 14 American Idol contender.
