= Southern Lapland =

Region of Lapland in Finland

Southern Lapland in Finland

Southern Lapland or Rear Bothnia (Finnish: Peräpohjola or Peräpohja; Swedish: Nordbotten or Överbotten; lit. 'North/Over Bothnia') was the northernmost part of the historical province of Ostrobothnia, and it has sometimes been considered a separate region, but it is now part of the Lapland region. It belonged to the province of Oulu for a long time, but from 1938 it formed the southern part of the province of Lapland, which was founded that year. Parts of the Salla-Kuusamo area, which included the easternmost part of southern Lapland, were ceded to the Soviet Union in 1940, after the end of the Winter War and again in 1944, after the end of the Continuation War.

The willow ptarmigan (Lagopus lagopus) is the regional bird of Southern Lapland.

== Municipalities of Southern Lapland ==
- Kemi
- Kemijärvi
- Keminmaa
- Kolari
- Pello
- Posio
- Ranua
- Rovaniemi
- Salla
- Simo
- Tervola
- Tornio
- Ylitornio

== See also ==
- Lapland (historical province of Finland)
- Peräpohjola dialects
