= Tornedalians =

National minority group of Sweden

tornionlaaksolaiset (Meänkieli)
- Flag of Tornedalians

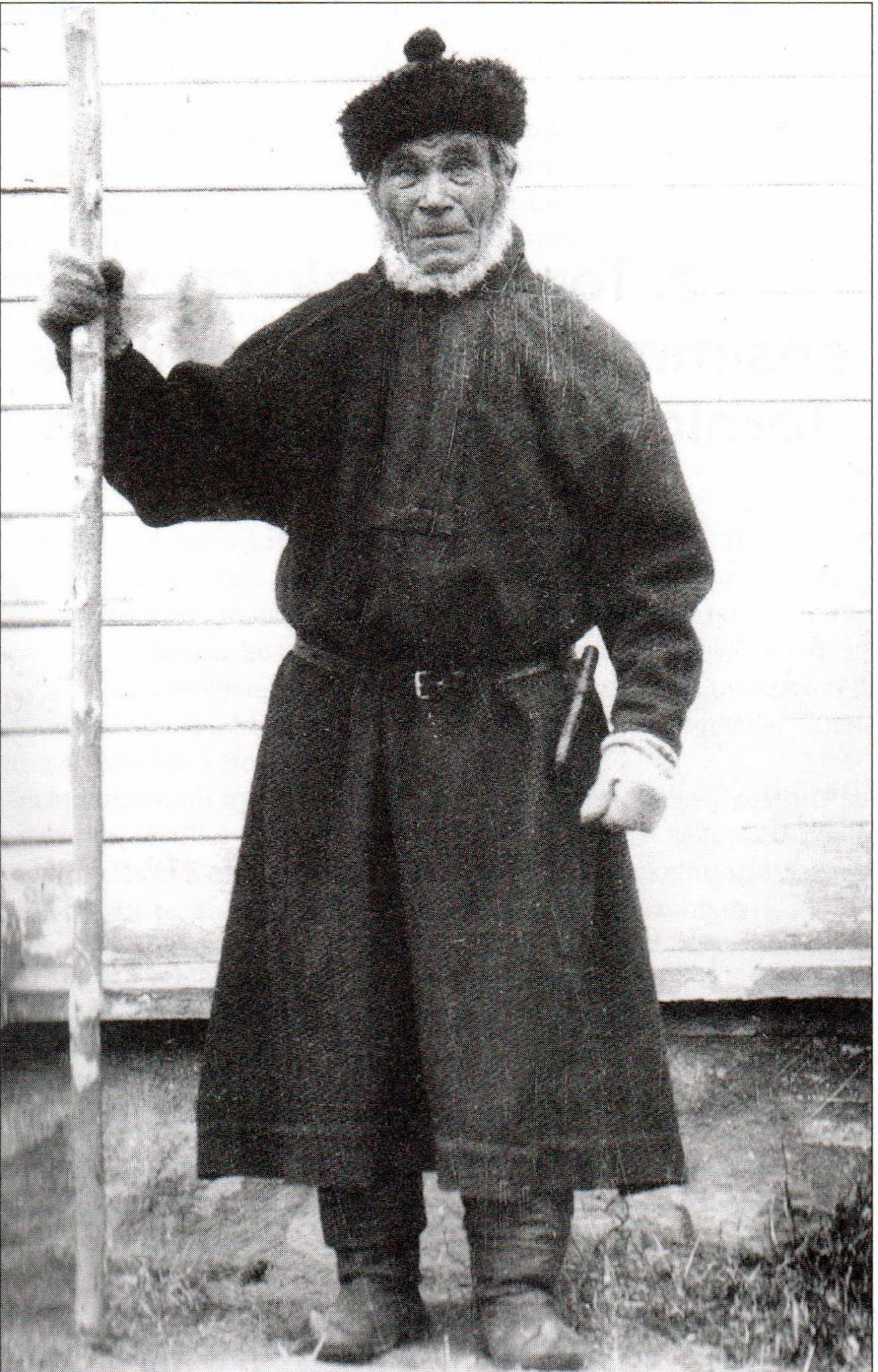
- Man from Kolari in traditional clothing

Regions with significant populations
- Sweden: 40,000–150,000

Languages
- Meänkieli, Finnish and Swedish

Religion
- Lutheranism (Laestadianism)

Related ethnic groups
- Kvens, Peräpohjalaiset, Finns, Karelians

Tornedalians (Meänkieli: tornionlaaksolaiset; Finnish: tornionjokilaaksolaiset; Swedish: tornedalingar) are an ethnic minority native to the Torne Valley (Meänmaa) region in northern Sweden and Finland. Tornedalians may refer to themselves using several different terms, though most commonly as Tornedalians, Kvens or Lantalaiset. Tornedalians were officially recognized as a distinct national minority in Sweden in 2000. In Finland, Tornedalians are generally considered a regional subgroup of Finns.

== Etymologies ==
The English word Tornedalian is derived from the Swedish name for the Torne Valley, Tornedalen. The Swedish word Tornedalen in turn is derived from the archaic Finnic word tornio meaning spear and the Swedish word dal which means valley.

Tornedalians use several different terms to refer to themselves. The term Tornedalian (Tornionlaaksolainen, pl. Tornionlaaksolaiset) originally refers specifically to someone living along the lower course of the Torne river, beginning roughly in Pajala municipality. The term has come to be used to denote all 'Tornedalians'. Lantalaiset (sl. Lantalainen; lit. "fertiliser/settled people") typically live in the further inland areas of Swedish and Finnish Lapland, known as Lannanmaa by Lantalaiset. The parts of Sweden inhabited by Lantalaiset largely correspond to the area known in Swedish as Malmfälten.

The term Kven has a disputed etymology. It appears for the first time in Ohthere of Hålogaland's 9th century accounts of northern Europe and is used mostly in Norwegian and Icelandic sources to refer to Tornedalians. With the integration of Torne Valley into Sweden the term fell into disuse in the Torne valley, though continued to be used among Norwegians Kvens. In Torne Valley the term featured in some traditional tales but was not actively used. Since the 1990s the term has been revived in Torne Valley and is especially commonly used by Lantalaiset. The term is also very common in the Karesuando (Karesuanto) area.

The somewhat derogatory Swedish terms byfinne (pl. byfinnar, lit. 'village Finns') and lappfinne (pl. lappfinnar, lit. 'Sámi Finns') have historically been used to describe the Meänkieli-speaking population in the Gällivare area. While the term lappfinne has fallen out of use, the term byfinne is still used.

Terms such as meänmaalaiset (lit. people of our land), meikäläiset (lit. people like us) and Kven (kvääni/kveeni) are used natively to refer to Tornedalians as a whole. Ultimately, there is no internal consensus on the use of any one term. Historically the term Finn has been used to denote all Tornedalians. While some Tornedalians will sometimes use the term Finn and Finnish, in contexts where being Tornedalians is implied, the term can be offensive to some. In a historical context the terms Finn and Finnish are sometimes still used.

These different terms/groups are not necessarily exclusive, and some may identify with multiple.

== Language ==
Meänkieli, or Tornedalian, is the language or dialect spoken by Tornedalians. While Meänkieli is recognised in Sweden as one of the country's five minority languages, its status as an independent language is sometimes disputed due to its high mutual intelligibility with Finnish. It belongs to the Uralic language family.

== History ==
=== Early history: 800–1323 ===
Finnic populations first began settling in the northern reaches of the Bay of Bothnia during the Viking Age, which had likely been solely inhabited by the Sámi. While the earliest mentions of Kvens come from the account of Ohthere of Hålogaland in the 800s, the first certain evidence of Finnic populations in the Torne valley comes from the 1000s. Finnic settlement in the Bothnian Bay likely extended as far as the Pite and Lule Rivers by the 1100s and 1200s. Local toponomy indicates early Finnic populations in the area were made up of Tavastians and Karelians. These may have formed the ancient Kvens, which are often considered ancestors of today's Tornedalians and Kvens, though the connection between the ancient Kvens and modern Tornedalians and Kvens has been disputed.

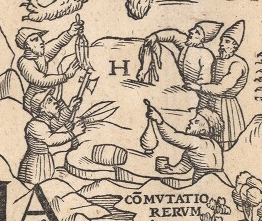
Birkarls trading as depicted on the Carta Marina (1539)

=== Early interactions with Sweden: 1300–1500 ===
In 1323, in the aftermath of the Treaty of Nöteborg, the government of King Magnus Eriksson of Sweden decreed that all land from Hälsingland to the Ule River would be free for settlement and that all those who did would be exempt from taxes until 1340. Five years later, in 1328, a legal hearing was held in Tälje as the birkarls, local Tornedalian tradesmen and representatives, disputed the right of the Hälsings (Swedes) to colonise the area. While the case was ruled in the favour of the birkarls and Sámi, and again re-confirmed in 1358 by king Erik Magnusson, Swedish expansion northwards nonetheless continued to encroach on Tornedalian lands. Likewise the rights of the birkarls to conduct trade were over the centuries be curtailed by Sweden which sought to establish control over the lucrative and well-developed northern trade. During the 1300s two churches were erected on Pirkkiö and near Kemi. These early churches were primarily constructed with the aim of establishing the administrative boundaries of the archdioceses of Uppsala and Turku, and did not serve to Christianise the area.

=== Swedish colonial era: 1500–1809 ===
Tensions between Sweden and Muscovy at the end of the 1400s led to the establishment of new churches in the northern Bothnian area and the replacement of old wooden churches with stone fortress-churches. They established further Swedish influence over the area, however their success in Christianising the Tornedalian populace during the 1500s is uncertain.

At the beginning of the 16th century there were around thirty villages in Torne Valley paying taxes to Sweden.

Gustav Vasa played a pivotal role in the decline of the Birkarls by doubling the tithes owed to the crown in 1528, beginning to tax their homesteads in 1543, and in 1554 he revoked their right to collect taxes, instead assigning the duty to agents of the crown.

In the mid-1500s the local birkarl-chieftain and the king's local bailif, called Olof Anundsson by the Swedes, was repeatedly accused of misconduct for refusing to visit church, deriding the authority of God and the Church, and mocking God's word.

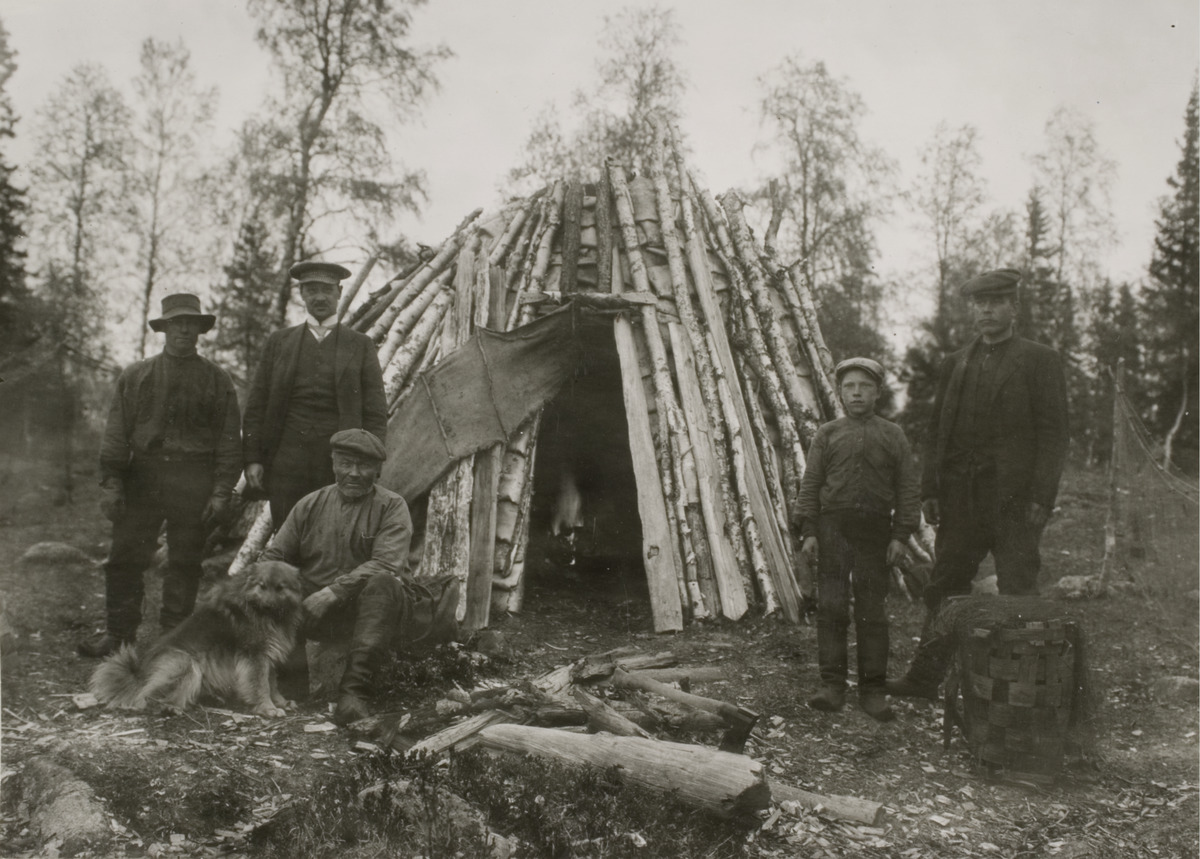
Fishing hut at Majamajärvi, Ylitornio. 1915.

In 1584 King Johan III had signed a decree 'regarding the protection of the inhabitants of the Lappmark from the intrusions of the Torne-peasants'. According to the document the right to fish in the inland lakes of northern Sweden and Finland would fall exclusively to those who lived closest by them. Because of this, Sámi families who lived in the area could take over fishing lakes and hunting grounds that had been in the hands of Tornedalian families. The inland fishing was vital to Tornedalian livelihood at the time and this, along with an increasing population over the course of the 17th and 18th centuries, led many to settle permanently in the inland in the areas that had only been seasonally inhabited by Tornedalians. Those who settled permanently in the inland came to be known as Lantalaiset. During this era relations between Sámi and Tornedalians continued to be positive overall despite increasingly predatory Swedish involvement. Most conflict was Tornedalian-Tornedalian or Sámi-Sámi, and land disputes between the groups were uncommon.

Charles IX imposed strict regulations on when, where and how the birkarls could trade and travel in general in Lappmarken. In the end the situation became untenable, and by 1620 the birkarls had ceased to exist as an entity. Despite their previous privileged status in Tornedalian society, very few birkarls became burghers, instead remaining as part of the peasantry. Simultaneously at the turn of the 17th century the Church of Sweden established itself in Torne Valley; the later 1500s had shown the failure of the Swedish church in the Torne Valley and in 1606 the church administration in the area was reformed. It is from this period which the last known pagan burials are known and Christianity is established clearly as the dominant religion.

==== The Great Wrath ====
During the early 18th century the Torne Valley, like other parts of the Swedish Empire, suffered severely because of the Great Northern War (1700-1721). By 1710, around 650 men from Ylitornio and Alatornio parishes had been conscripted into the army, amounting to roughly 20% of the region's adult population (city of Tornio and certain metalworks not included). Out of those 650 only a handful ever returned home.

The Torne valley was, like other regions of Finland, subject to what is known as the Great Wrath. From late 1714 onwards Russian forces continually launched attacks into Torne Valley. Already in 1714 a peasant host of around 300-400 men was levied from the local population, yet the poorly trained and equipped force saw few successes and proved ineffectual in hindering Russian attacks. Exact figures on how many died during this period is unclear, but according to reports from the spring of 1717, when the attacks had largely subsided, up to 400 people had thus far died due to exposure and starvation or had been killed by Russian forces. In addition, a notable number of people (mainly children) had been kidnapped and/or enslaved, though how many is unknown.

In total around 140 homesteads were burnt in the war, and still by the 1720s a further 80 stood abandoned. It would take decades before the region recovered.

=== Modern eta: 1809–today ===
Following the Treaty of Fredrikshamn between Sweden and Russia in 1809, all Swedish lands east of the Torne, Muonio and Könkämä rivers were ceded to Russia as the Grand Duchy of Finland. The split region continued to be culturally homogenous, so the border had little immediate impact on people's everyday lives. In time however the border would have a notable linguistic and cultural impact. Today Finnish Tornedalians typically do not consider their speech a separate language despite many speaking what otherwise could be considered Meänkieli.

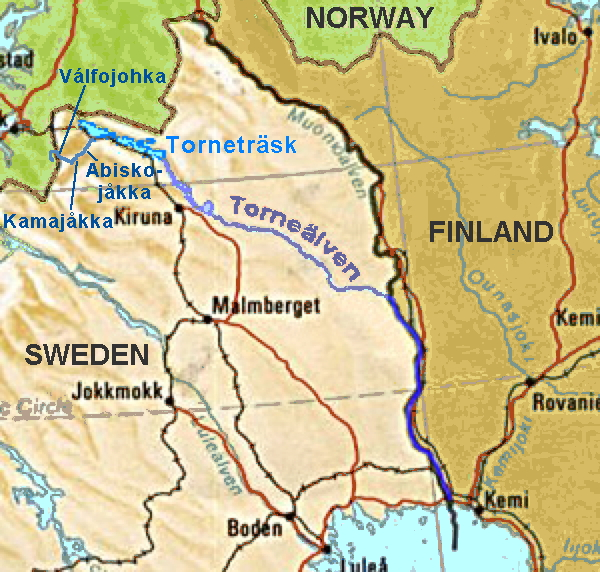
The Torne valley

During the 1800s Tornedalians became the targets of extensive so-called "racial biology" and Swedification policies, and many Tornedalian and Sámi graves were plundered at the behest of priests. Lars Levi Læstadius participated in the process of plundering graves.

In 1886 the first Swedish Reindeer Herding Act was introduced. It prohibited non-Sámi from herding reindeer. The law likewise restricted the rights of non-members of Samebyar to winter pastures, hunting, and fishing. Tornedalians thus had to 'lease' their own reindeer to vested Sámi herders. This state of affairs has largely been repeated in the Reindeer Herding Acts of 1898, 1928 and 1971.

In 1888 Swedish was made the sole language of civil life, and the only language taught in schools. No ban was ever instituted in Finland, but those who spoke the language were discriminated against. After the 1902 Norrbotten famine, "work cabins" were established in Norrbotten in the fashion of boarding schools with the stated goal of providing food, lodging and education to children from the sparsely populated region. Here, teachers worked to forcibly assimilate Tornedalian children; abuse was rampant. In the early to mid-1900s, Herman Lundborg from the State Institute for Racial Biology performed skull measurements on Tornedalians in 1913, which continued into the 1950s. The ban on speaking Meänkieli in school was revoked by the Riksdag in 1957. At Furunäset Hospital and Asylum (1893-1987) in Piteå, Tornedalian women were sterilised, were forced to have abortions, and were subjected to other invasive surgeries.

During the 1970s and 80s a Tornedalian movement was formed. In 1981 The National Association of Swedish Tornedalians (STR-T) was formed, and in 1992 the first Meänkieli dictionary was written.

In 2000, a new law went into effect recognising the Tornedalians as an official national minority and Meänkieli as an official minority language. A truth and reconciliation commission on historical discrimination against the population was appointed in 2020, and made its final report on 15 May 2023. In both 2020 and 2023, STR-T, the National Association of Swedish Tornedalians demanded that the Swedish government to investigate their status as an indigenous people in accordance with ILO 169, although both times the Swedish government has denied to do so.

In 2024 the remains of 23 Tornedalian and Sámi people (6 of which children) who had been buried at Akamella cemetery, near Muodoslompolo, were repatriated. The remains, which had been plundered in 1878, are the first remains of Tornedalian people to be repatriated.

According to statistics from Skolverket the number of pupils in Sweden studying Meänkieli increased three-fold between 2016 and 2026, from 95 to 294.

== Religion and beliefs ==
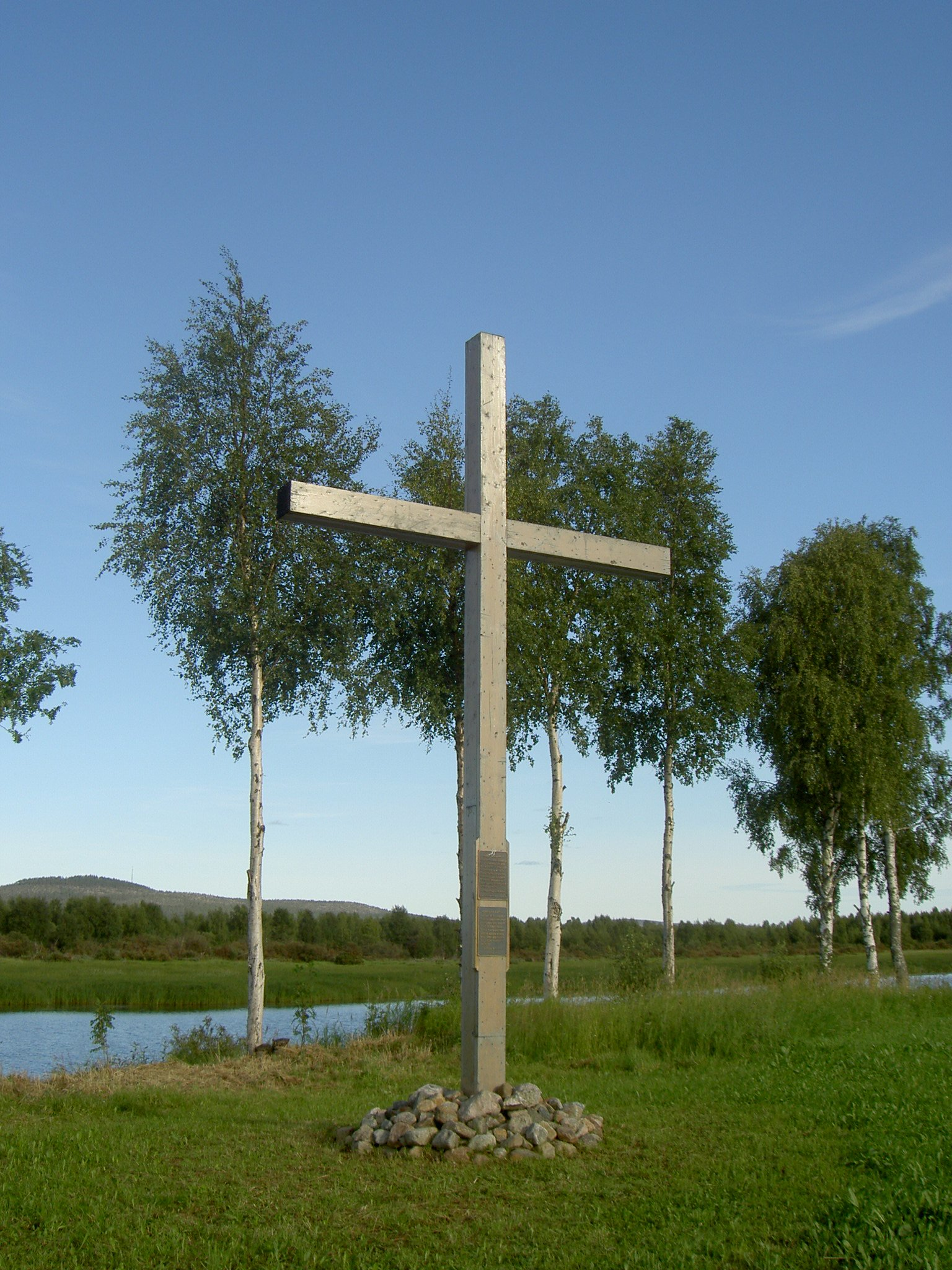
Cross commemorating the old church of Särkilaksi (Särkilax), first raised in the late 1400s, which was destroyed during the ice discharge of 1615.

Christianity first gained a foothold in the region in the 1400s. By the 1600s it had come to be the dominant religion displacing earlier pagan beliefs. Many pagan beliefs continued throughout the christianisation and afterwards. Jopmel/Jobmel was a key figure in Tornedalian beliefs, along with figures such as Hiisi, Perhana, Veen neiti, Jatuni, and others. According to traditional beliefs, a saivo is a special kind of holy "double-bottomed" lake which can act as a portal to the land of the dead. The jänkkäsilmä (lit. 'eye of the bog') was a similarly holy feature in nature, which could likewise transport a person to the other life or through time.

The noita, the same as the Sámi noaidi, was a traditional shaman. During the 1600s and 1700s when Christianity became dominant in Torne Valley the noita largely lost his importance as a religious figure and became primarily a keeper of traditional medical knowledge.

A significant religious shift would come to Torne Valley in the mid-1800s when the Swedish priest Lars Levi Læstadius began preaching his beliefs in the area. Læstadius spoke Sami but had no knowledge of Meänkieli when he first came to the area in the 1820s. While he first attempted to communicate via the Finnish he had learnt from a book, though he soon found that the local speech was rather different from "proper Finnish" and thus resolved to learn the language first-hand, travelling between different homes and villages and talking to many citizens. Læstadius gained great popularity in Torne Valley, though especially in his earlier years his devout belief in temperance caused trouble. When he died in 1861, Johan Raattamaa took up the mantle as spiritual leader of the movement. After his death in 1899 the movement splintered, though Læstadianism remains an important part of much of Tornedalian society.

During the 1930s, the Korpela Movement gripped Torne Valley. It taught that God would soon make a crystal bridge to Palestine where a utopia would be established. The movement was much more lenient with the consumption of alcohol and extramarital sexual relations. It became popular with lantalaiset. The movement's heyday came to an end in 1939/1940 when the last of its preachers were jailed but its beliefs have had a lasting impact in Torne Valley.

Liikutukset is an important practice of Tornedalian/Kven Læstadianism. The word roughly translates as 'movements' and involves moving about in a state of religious ecstasy often involving hopping, clapping, dancing, shouting praise, singing and similar activities.

== Population ==
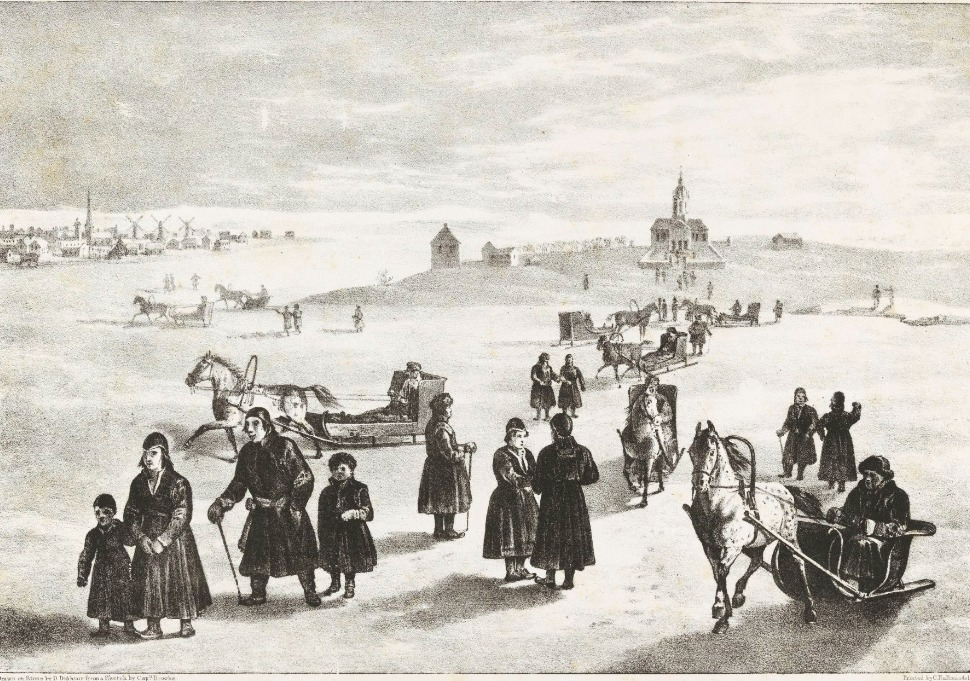
After Christmas service in Tornio, 1820s.

Sweden does not distinguish minority groups in population censuses. The number of people who identify themselves as "Tornedalians" is usually estimated to be between 30,000 and 150,000. Estimates are complicated by the fact that the remote and sparsely populated Tornedalen area has been particularly struck by the 20th-century urbanisation and unemployment. In 2006, a large radio survey about Finnish/Meänkieli speakers was conducted in Sweden. The result was that 469,000 individuals in Sweden claimed to understand or speak Finnish and/or Meänkieli. Those who can speak or understand Meänkieli are estimated to be 150,000–175,000.

Linguist Mikael Parkvall estimates an upper bound of 40,000 native speakers of Meänkieli, though it is unclear what part of the total Tornedalian population this number represents.

== Traditional clothing ==
Torne valley dress of 1912.

Traditional men's clothing was distinguished by the so-called långkolt (Swedish for "long gákti") along with a sort of blue or black hat typically adorned with red seams, often called a kairalakki. During winter the peski might be used over the långkolt. Blue and red were the most common colours but also black, yellow, grey and green featured commonly. Women often wore kirtles and short jackets, with a coif or huivi which is a sort of head scarf. What in Swedish is called a näbbsko (beak-shoe) is the traditional footwear used by Tornedalians. They are typically made of reindeer or cow hide. Winter shoes are known as nutukka, while summer shoes are known as paulakengät or vuotakengät. Historically, wealthier Lantalaiset sometimes wore Sámi silver belts. Because of Swedification little of this fashion has survived.

In 1912 a Swedish commission in Luleå, inspired by the romantic nationalism of the era, set about designing folk costumes for Norrbotten. It was then that the current Torne valley costume (Swedish: Tornedalsdräkt) was designed. The Torne valley dress was used in both schools and work camps and became very widespread. Today it has become a pillar of Tornedalian women's fashion. The men's dress seems to have never caught on. Silver and tin are commonly used in jewelry.

== Literature and cinema ==
The oldest works of native Tornedalian literature known today are two runic songs by Antti Keksi The first and most famous concerns the ice discharge of 1677, which brought massive carnage to Torne valley at the time. It was written down roughly 100 years after its composition and at the time accredited to his grandson Josef. The second surviving runic song by Keksi is much less famous and concerns the priest Nicolaus.

In 1944, despite the existing ban on Meänkieli, William Snell (1895-1980) wrote the first book in the language titled Kamaripirtiltä: muisteluksia Tornion murtheela. In 1947 he would go on to write Tornionlaakson laulu (Swedish: Tornedalssången; English: Torne Valley song) which today is considered almost a "national anthem" of sorts among Tornedalians. The work of William Snell preceded the cultural renaissance of the 1980s and would become very influential.

Bengt Pohjanen is one of the most prolific Tornedalian authors. In 1985 he wrote Lyykeri (English: Luger) the first novel in Meänkieli and has since written books, dramas, screenplays, songs and opera. He is trilingual in his writing.

The novel Popular Music from Vittula (2000) by the Tornedalian author Mikael Niemi became very popular both in Sweden and in Finland. It is composed of colourful stories of everyday life in the Tornedalian town of Pajala. The novel has been adapted for several stage productions, and as a film in 2004.

The first feature length movie in Meänkieli premiered in 2025. Titled Liikheitä in Meänkieli (English: Raptures; Swedish: Rörelser; Finnish: Valitut), it follows the rise and fall of the Korpela movement. It is directed by Jon Blåhed and based on Bengt Pohjanen's book Dagning; Röd!.

== Flag ==
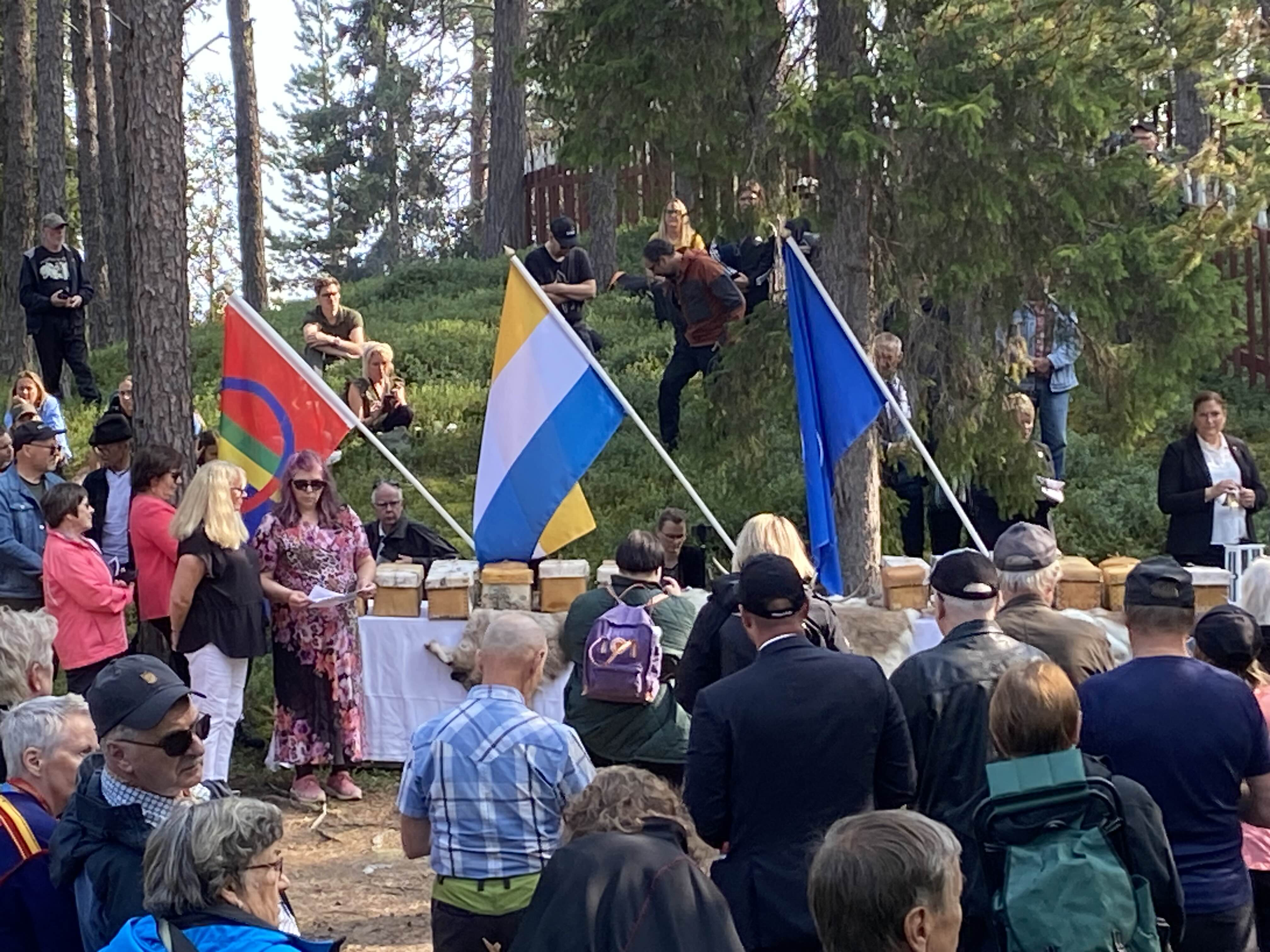
Sámi, Tornedalian and Kven flags during the Akamella repatriation ceremony.

The flag is a horizontal tricolour of yellow, white and blue. The flag was designed in 2007 by the organisation Meänmaa Tinkerit. The design references a quote credited to a Tornedalian woman as the border was being drawn: "The summer-blue sky, you cannot cut in two; Nor the white winter field can you part; And neither can you divide the clear yellow sun! That which you cannot cut in twain shall forever remain." or alternatively "You may gladly draw a line in the earth, but the air, sun and land - that you can never cut in two." The Nordic cross is not present on the flag as "No crusaders have we ever been". The flag initially faced some criticism as it was seen by some as a nationalist symbol.

The Meänmaa Flag Day is celebrated on July 15.

Lantalaiset and Kvens typically use the Kven flag instead, designed in 2009 by Bengt Johansson-Kyrö. The Kven flag day is March 16.

== See also ==
- Kven people
- Tornio, Finland
