= Official minority languages of Sweden =

In 1999, the Minority Language Committee of Sweden formally declared five official minority languages: Finnish, Sámi languages, Romani, Yiddish, and Meänkieli (Tornedal Finnish).

The Swedish language dominates commercial and cultural life in Sweden but did not officially become the country's main language until 2009, when a new language law entered into effect. The need for this legal status had been the subject of protracted debate and proposed legislation was narrowly defeated in 2005.

The minority languages have been legally recognized to protect the cultural and historical heritage of their respective speech communities. These communities are given certain rights on that basis, such as school education in their language, and its use in dealing with governmental agencies.

== Criteria for inclusion ==
These are the criteria established by the Minority Language Committee, influenced by the directives from the European Charter for Regional or Minority Languages in 1997.

To be accorded official minority status, a language must have been spoken in Sweden for a significant amount of time. A precise figure has not been revealed, but qualified estimations consider 100 years to be reasonable, based on the included and excluded languages. A significant immigration to Sweden did not start until after World War I, and many languages currently spoken by a large number of people in Sweden are excluded, among them Arabic and Persian.

It is also required that the language be spoken by a significant number of people and be centred in a specific geographical region. This criterion was waived for Romani and Yiddish.

Furthermore, it is a condition that the granting of official minority language status should be of cultural benefit to the group speaking it. It is allegedly for this reason that Swedish Sign Language was not included – even though it is a unique language with a history dating back to the 18th century, it was considered to have a sufficiently stable basis already in Swedish culture.

Common culture is yet another criterion for inclusion.

== Affected languages ==
Official administrative areas for Finnish, Meänkieli and Sámi languages: Finnish only; Finnish and Meänkieli; Sámi languages; Finnish and Sámi languages; Finnish, Meänkieli and Sámi languages

=== Finnish ===
Finnish has been spoken in Sweden ever since the (then provincial) borders were drawn in the 13th century. Sweden has always had a significant migration to and from Finland. As the two languages belong to different language families, it is easy to distinguish them, unlike the neighbouring languages Norwegian and Danish. The number of Finnish speakers in Sweden today has been estimated to over 460,000. Even though many current Swedes are of full or mixed Finnish descent, Swedish is the main language in practice for many bilinguals.

Finnish and Meänkieli can be used in the northernmost municipalities of Gällivare, Haparanda, Kiruna, Pajala and Övertorneå and its immediate neighbourhood.

On 11 December 2007, the Finnish Broadcasting Company (YLE) reported, that in Uppsala, Sweden, speaking Finnish was forbidden for municipal employees, and that this was the case also with small talk during breaks. According to an agreement between the city council and the municipal trade union the official working language is Swedish and two employees were not allowed to speak Finnish with one another in the common work premises or in break rooms. The Equality Ombudsman considered that a ban was permissible in that particular case.

The following municipalities are included in the administrative area for Finnish:

- Älvkarleby Municipality
- Borås Municipality
- Borlänge Municipality
- Botkyrka Municipality
- Degerfors Municipality
- Enköping Municipality
- Eskilstuna Municipality
- Fagersta Municipality
- Finspång Municipality
- Gällivare Municipality
- Gävle Municipality
- Gislaved Municipality
- Gothenburg Municipality
- Håbo Municipality
- Hällefors Municipality
- Hallstahammar Municipality
- Haninge Municipality
- Haparanda Municipality
- Hofors Municipality
- Huddinge Municipality
- Järfälla Municipality
- Kalix Municipality
- Karlskoga Municipality
- Kiruna Municipality
- Köping Municipality
- Kramfors Municipality
- Laxå Municipality
- Lindesberg Municipality
- Ludvika Municipality
- Luleå Municipality
- Malmö Municipality
- Mariestad Municipality
- Motala Municipality
- Norrköping Municipality
- Norrtälje Municipality
- Nykvarn Municipality
- Örebro Municipality
- Örnsköldsvik Municipality
- Österåker Municipality
- Östhammar Municipality
- Övertorneå Municipality
- Oxelösund Municipality
- Pajala Municipality
- Sandviken Municipality
- Sigtuna Municipality
- Skellefteå Municipality
- Skinnskatteberg Municipality
- Skövde Municipality
- Smedjebacken Municipality
- Söderhamn Municipality
- Södertälje Municipality
- Solna Municipality
- Stockholm Municipality
- Sundbyberg Municipality
- Sundsvall Municipality
- Surahammar Municipality
- Tierp Municipality
- Trelleborg Municipality
- Trollhättan Municipality
- Trosa Municipality
- Uddevalla Municipality
- Umeå Municipality
- Upplands-Bro Municipality
- Upplands Väsby Municipality
- Uppsala Municipality
- Västerås Municipality

=== Meänkieli ===
Meänkieli (also known as Tornionlaaksonsuomi [lit. Tornedalian Finnish] and Tornedalian) is spoken by a population in northern Sweden. Meänkieli is primarily considered a separate language in Sweden due to historical, sociological and political reasons arising from the creation of the 1809 border between Sweden and Finland. However on purely linguistic grounds, it may be viewed as a dialect of Finnish as it is highly mutually intelligible with the Northern Finnish dialects, although it contains much stronger influences from Swedish and has conserved some archaic features which the Northern dialects in Finland have lost. According to the National Association of Swedish Tornedalians, 70,000 individuals are able to understand Meänkieli, at least to some level.

The following municipalities are included in the administrative area for Meänkieli:

- Gällivare Municipality
- Haparanda Municipality
- Kalix Municipality
- Kiruna Municipality
- Luleå Municipality
- Övertorneå Municipality
- Pajala Municipality
- Stockholm Municipality
- Umeå Municipality

=== Sámi languages ===
In Sweden, Sámi languages encompasses five closely related Uralic languages — Lule, Northern, Pite, Southern, and Ume Sámi – although they are commonly referred to as a single language, Samiska, in the country. Of those who speak a Sámi language in Sweden, the majority (61%) speak Northern Sámi, followed by Southern Sámi (22%), and Lule Sámi (17%); Pite and Ume Sámi are critically endangered languages with few speakers. As a minority language, Sámi is an official language and may be used in government agencies, courts, preschools and nursing homes in the municipalities where it is most common.

The following municipalities are included in the administrative area for Sámi languages:

- Älvdalen Municipality
- Åre Municipality
- Arjeplog Municipality
- Arvidsjaur Municipality
- Åsele Municipality
- Berg Municipality
- Dorotea Municipality
- Gällivare Municipality
- Härjedalen Municipality
- Jokkmokk Municipality
- Kiruna Municipality
- Krokom Municipality
- Luleå Municipality
- Lycksele Municipality
- Malå Municipality
- Örnsköldsvik Municipality
- Östersund Municipality
- Piteå Municipality
- Skellefteå Municipality
- Sorsele Municipality
- Stockholm Municipality
- Storuman Municipality
- Strömsund Municipality
- Sundsvall Municipality
- Umeå Municipality
- Vilhelmina Municipality
- Vindeln Municipality

=== Romani ===
Romani chib, the language of Romani people, has been spoken in Sweden since the 16th century. Today about 9,500 people speak it in Sweden. It does not have a geographical center, but is considered to be of historical importance.

=== Yiddish ===
Yiddish has been a common language of Ashkenazi (Central and Eastern European) Jews since early in their history. The first Jews were permitted to reside in Sweden during the late 18th century. As of 2009, the Jewish population in Sweden was estimated at around 20,000. Out of these 2,000–6,000 claim to have at least some knowledge of Yiddish according to various reports and surveys. The number of native speakers among these has been estimated by linguist Mikael Parkvall to be 750–1,500. It is believed that virtually all native speakers of Yiddish in Sweden today are adults, and most of them elderly.

The organization Sveriges Jiddischförbund (Yiddish Association of Sweden) has been the national parent organization for Yiddish speakers and has four local chapters in Borås, Gothenburg, Stockholm and Malmö. It has been active since 1976 and was previously known as Sällskapet för jiddisch och jiddischkultur i Sverige (The Society for Yiddish and Yiddish Culture in Sweden) which is now the name of the chapter based in Stockholm.

Romani and Yiddish have minority language status throughout the country and are covered by government obligations regarding their preservation.

== See also ==
- Demographics of Sweden
- Languages of Sweden
- Languages of the European Union
- Language policy

== References and notes ==
- Sveriges officiella minoritetsspråk, Svenska språknämnden 2003. (In Swedish)
- National minorities and minority languages, Integrations- och jämställdhetsdepartementet, Informationsmaterial IJ 07.07e, 13 July 2007
