= Sigyn (disambiguation) =

Sigyn is a goddess and wife of Loki in Norse mythology.

Sigyn may also refer to:

- Sigyn (ship), a wooden barque of 1887, now museum ship in Turku
- MS Sigyn, a ship that transports spent nuclear fuel from Swedish nuclear power plants to Clab
- Sigyn, a genus of parasitic isopods in the family Bopyridae
- Sigyn (Marvel Comics), a fictional character appearing in the Marvel Comics universe
- 3631 Sigyn, a main-belt asteroid discovered 1987 by E. W. Elst at La Silla
- Sigyn Glacier, a glacier in Queen Maud Land
