= List of power stations in Sweden =

The following page lists all the power stations in Sweden. For traction power, see List of installations for 15 kV AC railway electrification in Sweden.

== Nuclear ==
Name	Site	Coordinates	Type	Capacity (MW)	Operational	Current status	Manufacturer
Barsebäck 1	Barsebäckshamn	55°44′35″N 12°55′18″E	BWR	600	1975–1999	decommissioned	ASEA-Atom
Barsebäck 2	Barsebäckshamn	55°44′39″N 12°55′13″E	BWR	600	1977–2005	decommissioned	ASEA-Atom
Forsmark 1	Forsmark	60°24′20″N 18°09′41″E	BWR	984	1980–	operational	ASEA-Atom
Forsmark 2	Forsmark	60°24′14″N 18°10′24″E	BWR	1,120	1981–	operational	ASEA-Atom
Forsmark 3	Forsmark	60°24′10″N 18°10′31″E	BWR	1,167	1985–	operational	ASEA-Atom
Oskarshamn 1	Figeholm	57°24′45″N 16°39′59″E	BWR	473	1972–2017	decommissioned	OKG AB
Oskarshamn 2	Figeholm	57°24′46″N 16°40′04″E	BWR	638	1975–2015	decommissioned	OKG AB
Oskarshamn 3	Figeholm	57°24′58″N 16°40′23″E	BWR	1,400	1985–	operational	OKG AB
Ringhals 1	Gloppe	57°15′43″N 12°06′41″E	BWR	865	1976–2020	decommissioned	ASEA-Atom
Ringhals 2	Gloppe	57°15′39″N 12°06′46″E	PWR	900	1975–2019	decommissioned	Westinghouse Electric Company
Ringhals 3	Gloppe	57°15′29″N 12°06′25″E	PWR	1,070	1981–	operational	Westinghouse Electric Company
Ringhals 4	Gloppe	57°15′24″N 12°06′31″E	PWR	1,120	1983–	operational	Westinghouse Electric Company

== Fossil fuel ==
Station	Site	Coordinates	Capacity (MW)	Status	Type of fuel
Karlshamn Power Station	Karlshamn	58°05′10″N 14°50′01″E	662	Used as reserve	Fuel oil
Stenungsund Power Station	Stenungsund	56°09′08″N 11°50′38″E	820	Decommissioned	Fuel oil
Öresund Power Station	Malmö	55°37′33.61″N 13°2′18.67″E	440	Decommissioned	Natural gas

== Hydroelectric ==
There are perhaps a thousand more hydroelectric plants in Sweden not listed here. Today, there are 46 stations at 100 MW and over, 18 at 200 MW and over, 6 at 400 MW and over, and two over 500 MW.

Station	Site	Coordinates	Capacity (MW)	Notes	River
Älvkarleby Hydroelectric Power Station	Älvkarleby	60°33′50″N 17°26′32″E	126	2nd largest on the river	Dal River
Hojum Hydroelectric Power Station	Trollhättan	58°16′49″N 12°16′43″E	170	Largest in Götaland	Göta älv
Juktan Pumped-Storage Hydroelectric Power Station	Gunnam	64°57′37″N 17°34′47″E	334	-	Juktån
Letten Pumped-Storage Hydroelectric Power Station	Värmland	60°42′38″N 12°40′26″E	36	PHS	Letten
Olidan Hydroelectric Power Station	Trollhättan	58°16′30″N 12°16′21″E	130	One of the oldest in the country	Göta älv
Porjus Hydroelectric Power Station	Porjus	66°57′15″N 19°47′46″E	480	3rd largest in Sweden	Lule River
Harsprånget Hydroelectric power station	Harsprånget	66°53′06″N 19°48′53″E	977	Largest in Sweden	Lule River
Stornorrfors Hydroelectric power station	Norrfors	63°31′08″N 20°21′36″E	599	2nd largest in Sweden	Ume River
Messaure	Messaure	66°24′36″N 20°12′00″E	460	101 m dam	Lule River
Letsi	Letsi	66°30′16″N 20°23′02″E	456	First and largest in the river	Lesser Lule River
Kilforsen	Kilforsen	63°19′28″N 16°27′15″E	415	6th largest in Sweden	Fjällsjö River
Trängslet Dam	Trängslet	61°22′48″N 13°43′48″E	330	Highest dam in Sweden, 120 m	Dal River

== Wind farms ==
Farm	Municipality	Coordinates	Capacity (MW)	Turbines	Commissioned
Aapua Wind Farm	Övertorneå, Norrbotten	66°51′45″N 23°32′14″E	10	7	2005
Blaiken	Arjeplog, Norrbotten		250	100	2011–2015
Falkenberg	Falkenberg, Halland		11	15	
Fjällberget	Ludvika Dalarna		10	5	2006
Hedagården-Tågarp wind park	Svalöv, Skåne		9	6	
Hedboberget			18	9	2008
Hornberg Wind Farm	Malå, Västerbotten		10	5	2007
Jädraås	Ockelbo, Gävleborg		203	66	2013
Landskrona	Landskrona, Skåne		7	12	
Lillgrund Wind Farm	Malmö, Skåne	55°31′N 12°47′E	110	48	2007
Långå Wind Farm	Härjedalen, Jämtland		10	5	
Lärbro	Gotland, Gotland		9	10	
Mungseröd wind park	Tanum, Västra Götaland		9	6	
Näs	Gotland, Gotland		72	38	
Råshön Wind Farm	Krokom, Jämtland		10	7	
Slite	Gotland, Gotland		11	12	
Stora Istad Wind Farm	Borgholm, Kalmar		10	5	2007
Utgrunden			10	7	
Yttre Stengrund			10	5	2001; decommissioned in 2015
Älmhult power farm (formerly Kastlösa)			9	16	
Bliekavare				18	
Bondön				14	
Brattön				10	
Dragaliden			24	12	2010
Gabrielsberget				40	2012
Glötesvålen				30	
Gässlingegrund				10	
Havsnäs Wind Farm			95	48	2009
Hud/Kil				10	
Markbygden Wind Farm	Piteå, Norrbotten County	65°25′N 20°40′E	4,000	1,100	2020
Rautirova				19	
Råshön wind farm	Krokom, Jämtland		2	1	2010
Sjisjka				30	
Storrun	Krokum		30	12	2009
Saxberget				17	
Skottarevet				30	
Säliträdberget				8	
Uljaboda				10	

== See also ==
- List of largest power stations in the world
