= Lovikkavante =

Swedish knitted handwear

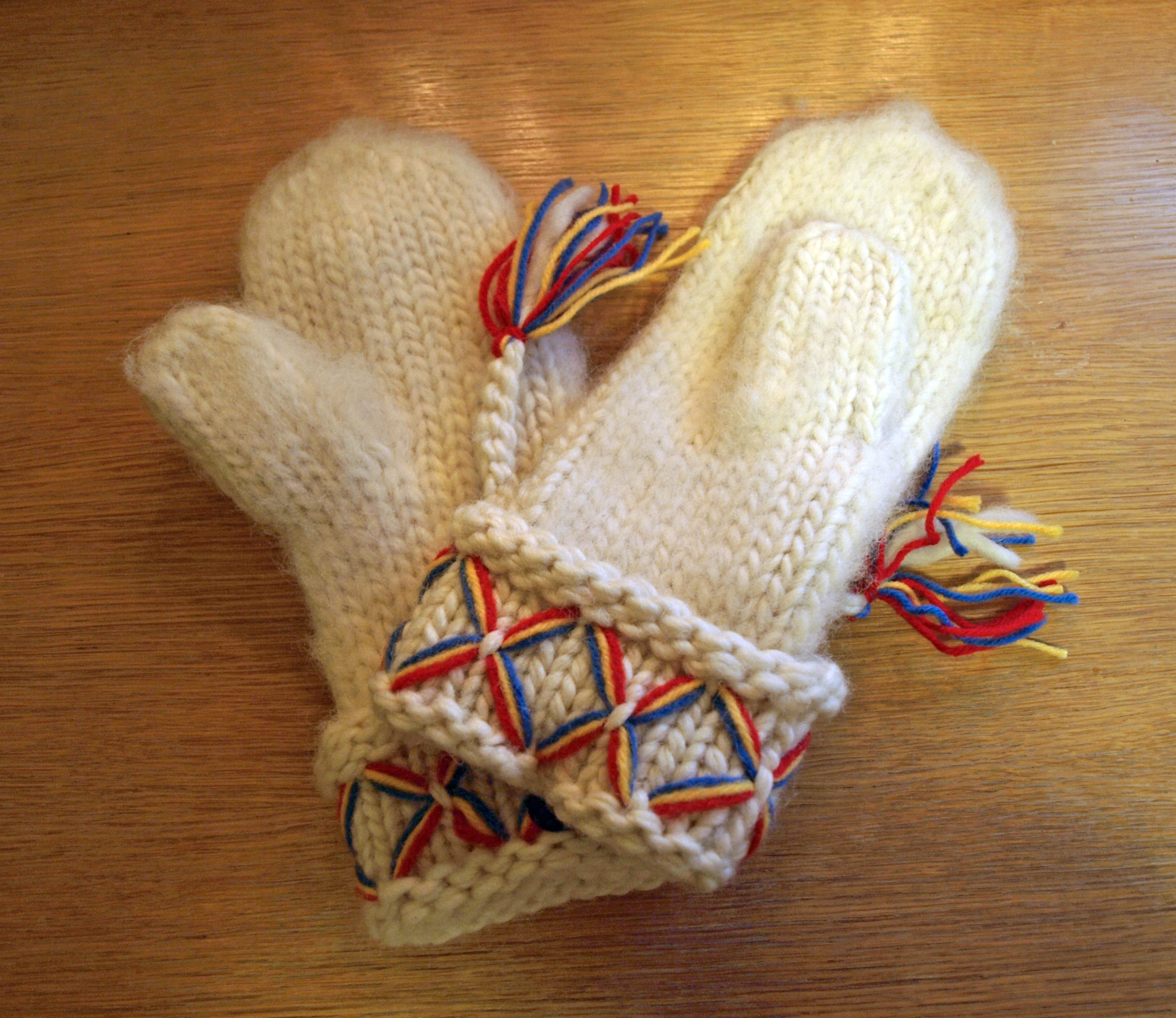
Lovikkavantar

Lovikkavante ('Lovikka Mitten') is a noted Swedish glove or mitten originating from the village of Lovikka, in the district of Junosuando by the Torne River in Pajala Municipality, Norrbotten in Northern Sweden. It is a knitted wool mitten manufactured and designed in accordance with the pattern established by its creator Erika Aittamaa in 1892, especially designed for the cold climate of Northern Sweden. The village of Lovikka has a small museum dedicated to the history and design of the mittens.
