= Ohtana/Aapua FF =

Swedish football club

- Full name: Ohtanajärvi/Aapua Fotbollsförening
- Founded: 1998
- Ground: Skolvallen, Ohtanajärvi and Byavallen, Aapua
- Chairman: Ove Andersson
- Coach: Mika Liikamaa; Stefan Funck
- League: Division 4 Norra Norrbotten
- 2009: Division 3 Norra Norrland, 7th
Home colours	Away colours

Ohtana/Aapua FF is a Swedish football club located in Ohtanajärvi in Pajala Municipality and Aapua in Övertorneå Municipality, Norrbotten County.

== Background ==
Ohtanajärvi/Aapua Fotbollsförening were formed in 1998 following the merger of the Ohtanajärvi IK and Aapua IF clubs. Ohtanajärvi IK was established on 20 June 1950 at a meeting in the school in Ohtanajärvi

Since their foundation Ohtana/Aapua FF has participated in the middle and lower divisions of the Swedish football league system. The club currently plays in Division 3 Norra Norrland which is the fifth tier of Swedish football. They play their home matches at the Skolvallen in Ohtanajärvi and Byavallen in Aapua.

Ohtana/Aapua FF are affiliated to the Norrbottens Fotbollförbund. The club compete in the Midnattsolscupen (Midnight Sun Cup) and in 2010 reached the final where they lost on penalties to Stolitsa Moskva.

== Recent history ==
In recent seasons Ohtana/Aapua FF have competed in the following divisions: 2013 Division III, Norra Norrland 2012 Division IV, Norrbotten Norra 2011 Division IV, Norrbotten Norra
2010 Division III, Norra Norrland
2009 Division III, Norra Norrland
2008 Division III, Norra Norrland
2007 Division III, Norra Norrland
2006 Division III, Norra Norrland
2005 Division IV, Norrbotten Norra
2004 Division III, Norra Norrland
2003 Division IV, Norrbotten Norra
2002 Division IV, Norrbotten Norra
2001 Division IV, Norrbotten Norra
2000 Division IV, Norrbotten Norra
1999 Division IV, Norrbotten Norra
