= Tärendö River =

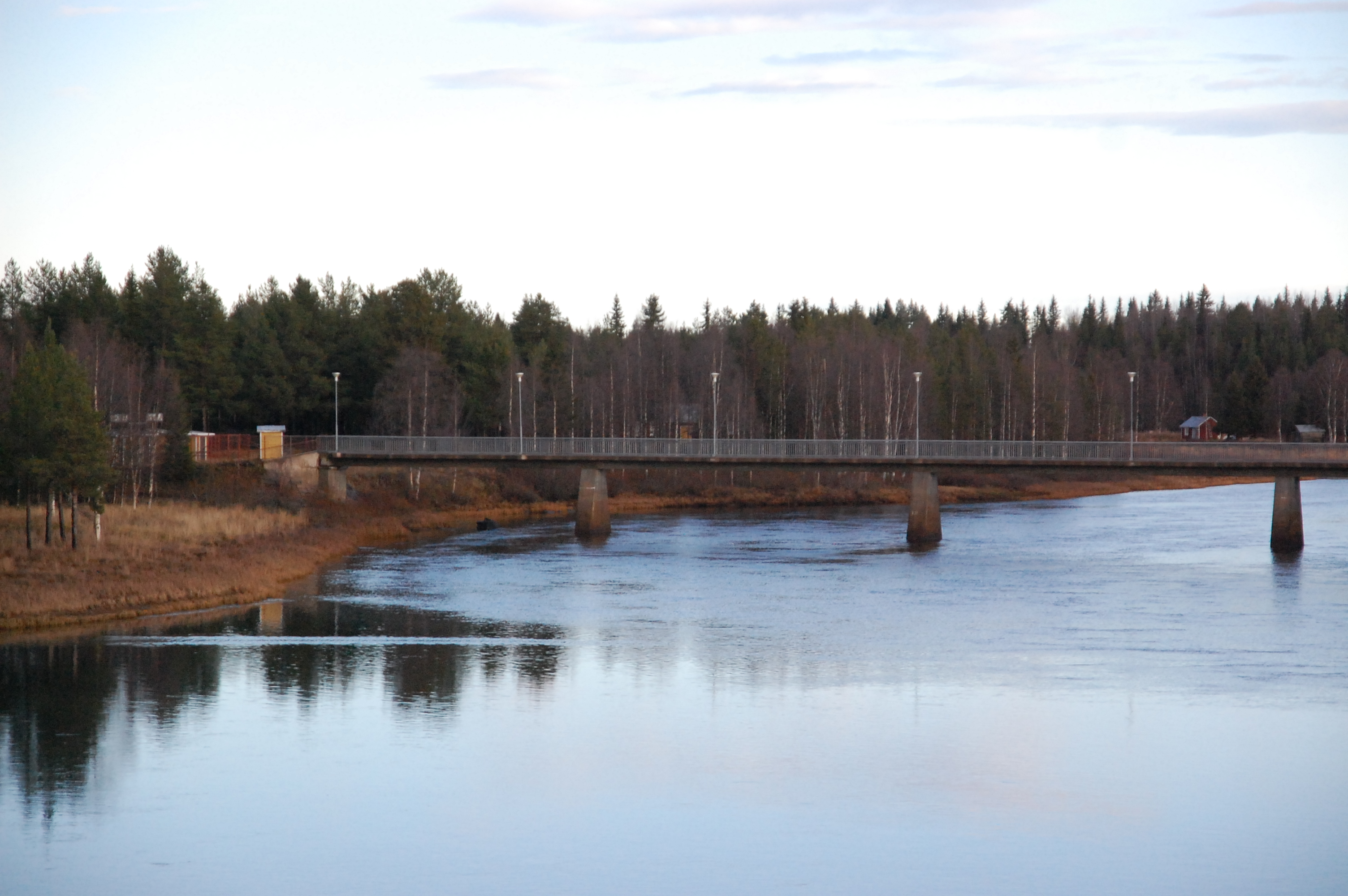
- Tärendö river in late October 2011

Location
- Country: Sweden
- County: Norrbotten County

Physical characteristics
- Source: Torne River
  - coordinates: 67°26′40″N 22°26′50″E
  - elevation: 210 m (690 ft)
- Mouth: Kalix River
  - coordinates: 67°09′40″N 22°38′25″E
  - elevation: 160 m (520 ft)
- Length: 52 km (32 mi)
- Discharge
  - average: 80 m^{3}/s (2,800 cu ft/s)

The Tärendö River (Swedish: Tärendö älv, Meänkieli: Täränönväylä) is a small distributary river to the Kalix River in Norrbotten, Sweden. It is the second largest bifurcation in the world (second only to the Casiquiare canal, South America).

The Tärendö River splits off the Torne River in Pajala Municipality, near the village of Junosuando, at an altitude of 210m. It takes more than 50% of the water in the Torne River.

It flows southeast for 52km, passing Lautakoski and Koijuniemi, then empties into the Kalix River at the village of Tärendö at an altitude of 160m.

Right-bank tributaries of the Tärendö River are Meras River, Vuosto River, and Jukkas River. The Kari River flows into the Tärendö River on the left.

Like many other rivers in Nordkalotten and Norrland, the river is popular for fishing.
