= Saitta River =

Location
- Country: Sweden

Saitta River, locally known as Saittajoki, is a small watercourse in Pajala Municipality in northern Sweden. It is 7km long, flowing north from Lake Saittajärvi into the Vuosto River, which then flows into the Tärendö River.

Saitta River is listed in Sweden's official Water Information System (VISS) as waterbody WA92864138.

The river flows in the Torne Valley region near Saittarova and Lautakoski.
