= Keräntöjärvi =

Village in Pajala Municipality, Sweden

Coordinates: 67°39′N 22°55′E

Keräntöjärvi is a small settler village in the northern part of Pajala Municipality, Sweden. The village is positioned about 30 kilometres north of Kangos, and was founded about 1810 by Johan Hansson Nilimaa, also known as "Holman Jussa", from the village of Lovika. The village achieved some notability due to a theatre play performed by the Kiruna theatrical company. Its title was Frieriet i Kerändöjärvi ("The marriage proposal in Kerändöjärvi"), and was directed by Ulla Lyttkens. The play was widely appreciated, and was played at various locations in Norrbotten County, in the rest of Sweden, and at a Theatre Festival in Turkey.

The population is mostly of Finnish ancestry, but some saami elements has it presence within the village.

The elementary school in Keräntöjärvi was closed down in the early 1980s. The school building is now rented out during the summertime, and a gym has been installed there for leisure.
