= MS Sigyn =

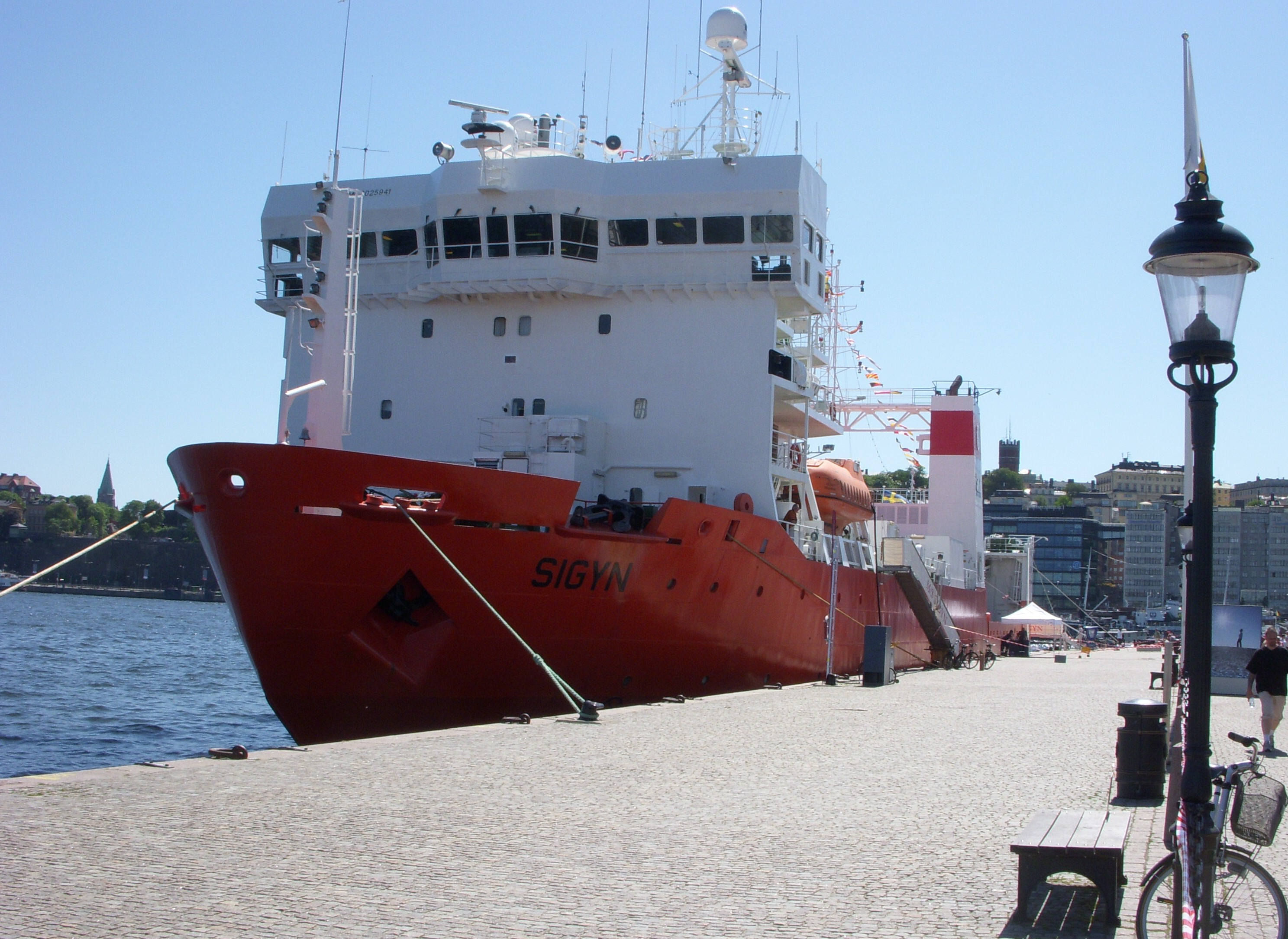
- Sigyn at Stockholm, 2009

History

Sweden
- Name: M/S Sigyn
- Namesake: Sigyn
- Owner: SKB
- Operator: Furetank Rederi
- Builder: Société Nouvelle des Ateliers et Chantiers du Havre, Le Havre, France
- Launched: 24 February 1982
- In service: 1982-2013
- Identification: IMO number: 8025941; Call sign: SLGW; MMSI number: 265043000
- Fate: Broken up in 2015

General characteristics
- Type: Cargo ship
- Tonnage: 4,166 GT; 1,249 NT
- Length: 90.33 m (296 ft 4 in) o/a; 82.07 m (269 ft 3 in) p/p
- Beam: 18.04 m (59 ft 2 in)
- Draught: 4 m (13 ft 1 in)
- Depth: 6.65 m (21 ft 10 in)
- Propulsion: 2 × B&W Alpha 6S28LVO diesel engines, 2,343 kW (3,142 hp)
- Speed: 12.5 knots (23.2 km/h; 14.4 mph)
- Crew: 12

M/S Sigyn was a ship that transported spent nuclear fuel and nuclear waste from Swedish nuclear power plants to Clab, the storage facility at Oskarshamn and the waste facilities at Studsvik and Forsmark. She was named after the goddess Sigyn, the mythological wife of Loki. Her name alluded to the role Sigyn played in holding a cup over the fettered Loki, catching the venom dripping from a viper perched above him.

Sigyn was built in 1982 by the French Société Nouvelle des Ateliers et Chantiers du Havre at Le Havre, and could transport up to ten containers for spent fuel or radioactive waste. The ship could also take one or two vehicles or standard shipping containers for low-level waste. A stern ramp enabled roll-on/roll-off loading and unloading from the 59 m (194 ft) long cargo deck.

Sigyn was owned by Svensk Kärnbränslehantering AB (SKB) (Swedish Nuclear Fuel and Waste Management Company), but was operated and staffed by Furetank Rederi AB (Furetank Shipping Company)

In December 2010 it was announced that SKB have ordered a new ship from the Dutch Damen Group to replace Sigyn. The new ship named Sigrid, was laid down in Galați, Romania, in December 2011, and was delivered in May 2013. In October 2012 this new Nuclear Cargo Vessel 1600 was launched.
