= Jessica Stegrud =

Swedish politician (born 1970)

Jessica Stegrud MEP
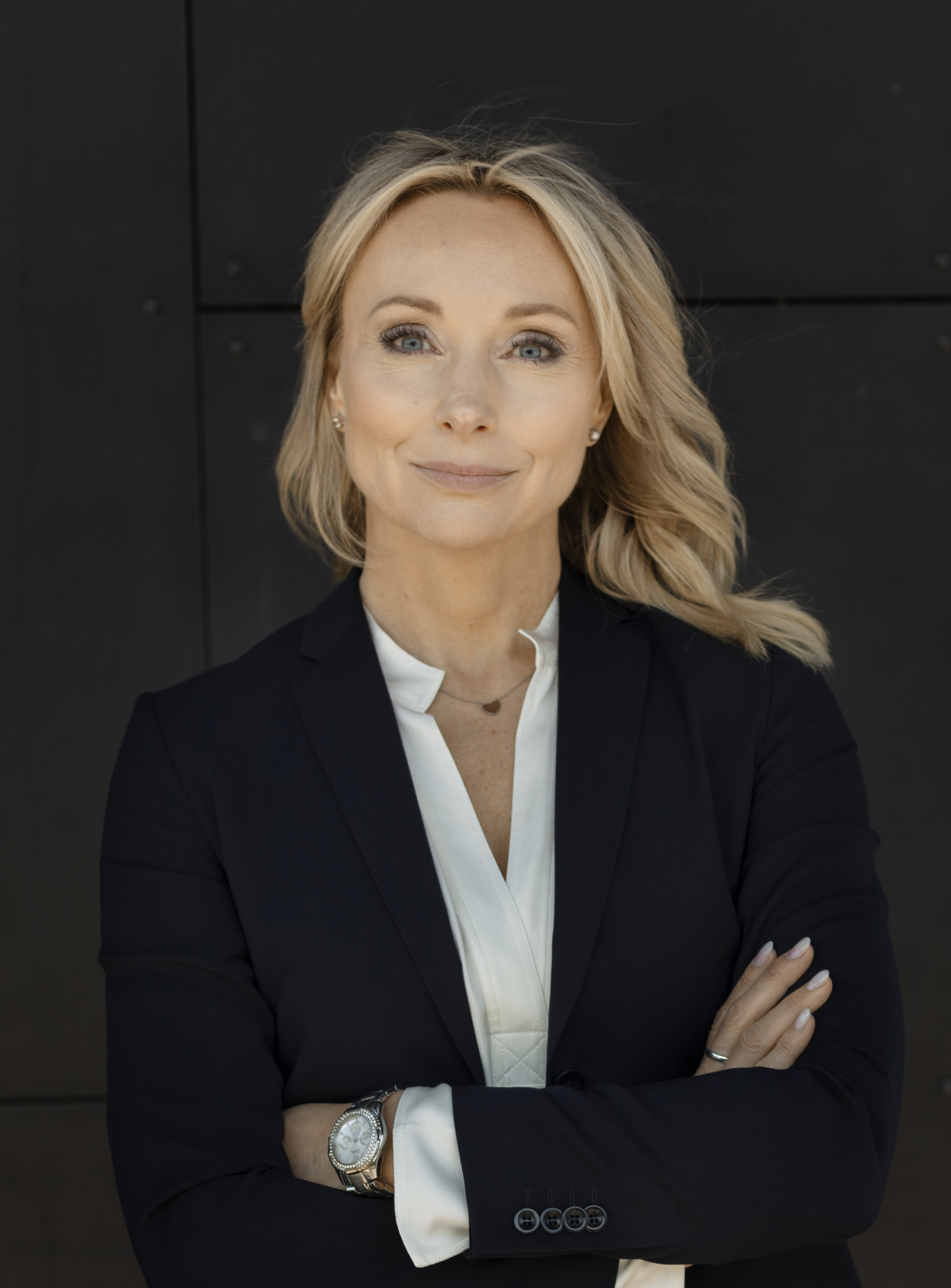

Member of the Riksdag
- Incumbent
- Assumed office 26 September 2022

Member of the European Parliament
- In office 2 July 2019 – 25 September 2022
- Constituency: Sweden

Personal details
- Born: Jessica Margareta Stegrud; 27 September 1970 (age 55) Slite, Sweden
- Party: Sweden; Sweden Democrats; European Union; European Conservatives and Reformists

Jessica Margareta Stegrud (born 27 September 1970) is a Swedish politician and Member of the European Parliament (MEP) from 2019 to 2022. She is a member of the Sweden Democrats and was part of European Conservatives and Reformists in the European Parliament.

During the 2022 Swedish general election, she was elected to the Swedish Parliament (Riksdag) and resigned her seat in the European Parliament. She was replaced by Johan Nissinen.

== Career ==
Stegrud studied economics at the Karlstad University from 1989 to 1991 and at the Gävle University College from 1991 to 1993. In 1994, she completed a course in the French language at the Université d'Angers. She was employed as a management consultant at Sydkraft and then EON Sverige AB from 2001 until her election to the European Parliament in 2019. She had not been a member of the Sweden Democrats before her candidacy in the 2019 European Parliament election in Sweden.

In the European Parliament, Stegrud sat with the European Conservatives and Reformists group. She was a member of the energy committee, the committee for gender equality and delegations for relationships with China.
