= Erika Aittamaa =

Swedish mitten inventor

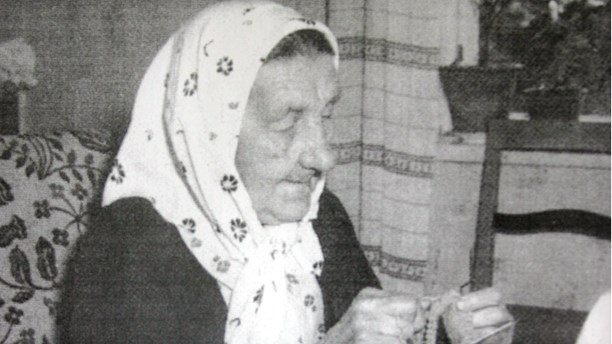
- Born: Maria Erika Olofsdotter Kruukka; 22 February 1866; Junosuando, Sweden
- Died: 15 December 1952 (aged 86); Junosuando, Sweden

Maria Erika "Riiga" Olofsdotter Aittamaa, née Kruukka, (22 February 1866 – 15 December 1952) was a Tornedalian artisan, famed as the inventor of the Lovikkavante mitten.

== Biography ==
Aittamaa was born to a poor family with many children. A part of the Finnic Meänkieli-speaking population of the Norrbotten County in northern Sweden, she lived in Lovikka with her husband and children and started to sell mittens to make money.

In 1892 she invented the Lovikkavante, a special kind of mittens. Demand for Erika's mittens became so great that she taught others how to make them. During the 1930s a local teacher found that she could patent the design. The process however cost money and although the teacher found people who would fund the cost, Aittamaa refused to take charity.
