= Stora Istad Wind Farm =

Wind farm in Öland, Sweden

- Country: Sweden
- Location: Borgholm Municipality, Kalmar County, Sweden
- Coordinates: 56°56′7″N 16°49′5″E
- Status: Operational
- Construction began: April 2006
- Commission date: November 7, 2007
- Construction cost: 150 million Swedish kronor
- Owner: Istad Vind AB

Wind farm
- Hub height: 119 m
- Rotor diameter: 82 m

Power generation
- Units operational: 5 1.95 MW
- Make and model: Enercon: E82
- Nameplate capacity: 10 MW

The Stora Istad wind park (Swedish: Istadparken) near Stora Istad in Borgholm Municipality, Kalmar County, Sweden is a wind park on the island of Öland.

== History ==
A meeting with affected landowners took place November 9, 1999, and a land-use contract was signed on November 15, 1999. However, delays in the form of an environmental impact assessment requirement from the County Administrative Board, an expanded list of affected landowners, and the contractor's, Eolus Vind AB, building permit process intervened. A new tenancy agreement was signed November 2004, and the Miljödomstolen declared its approval of the project on July 21, 2005. Construction commenced in April 2006 with unit one, Stora Istad 1, on the north end of the site.

Following these delays, the completed park sat idle, waiting for connection to the grid by E.ON Sverige.

The park was opened on November 7, 2007 with State Secretary Jöran Hägglund of the Ministry of Enterprise, Energy and Communications in attendance. It cost a total of 150 million Swedish kronor and is investor-owned via Istad Vind AB.

== Technical details ==
The Stora Istad wind park has five Enercon E82 turbines, each rated at 1950 kW, for a total capacity of about 10 MW. The turbines have a rotor diameter of 82 meters and a total height of 119 meters. Initially, the park was, like others in Sweden, subject to a ceiling of 10 MW, requiring the operators to throttle its output by 0.5 MW to avoid exceeding it.

The park's substation was dimensioned for the addition of a further three turbines.

== See also ==
- List of wind farms in Sweden
