= Diarabi =

Diarabi may refer to:

- "Diarabi", a song by Goat from World Music (2012)
- "Diarabi", a song by Vieux Farka Touré and Khruangbin from Ali (2022)
- "Diarabi", a song by Kaaris from Dozo (2017)
