= Anders Björgerd =

Swedish businessman

Anders Björgerd (8 November 1920 – 18 July 2017) was a Swedish businessman who was deputy CEO of Sweden's largest publicly listed utility, Sydkraft (now E.ON Sverige AB), between the years 1970–1987. He started his career as a trainee with Siemens, and later gained employment with Swedish engineering firm ASEA before embarking on his career path with Sydkraft in Malmö, Sweden.

Björgerd was also the chairman of the board for Sydgas, a wholly owned subsidiary of Sydkraft and one of Scandinavia's largest suppliers of LPG. He is one of the founders and former owner of Swedpower, Scandinavia's largest energy consultancy firm (now operating under the name Vattenfall Power Consultant AB, a wholly owned subsidiary of Vattenfall).

He also served as chairman of one of the national state pension funds, 5:e AP Fonden (now 3:e AP Fonden), as well as being a member of the advisory board of the Swedish Energy Commission. Björgerd died in July 2017 at the age of 96.
