= Korpilombolo =

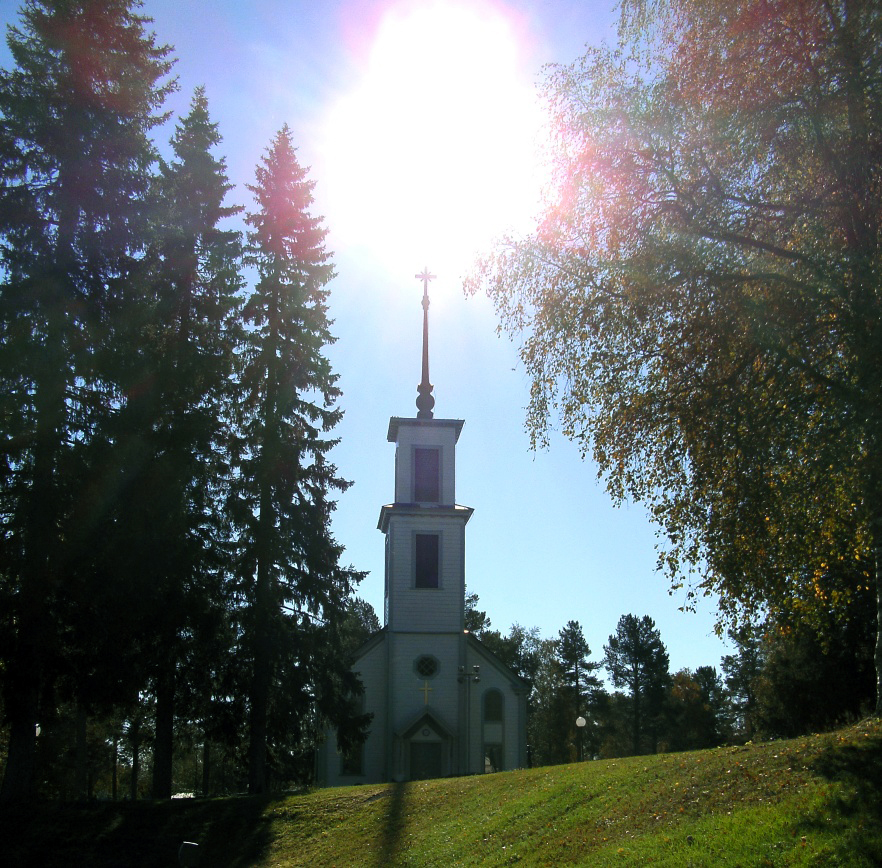
- Korpilombolo Church in early September 2014

- Location within Norrbotten Location within Sweden
- Coordinates: 66°51′N 23°03′E
- Country: Sweden
- Province: Norrbotten
- County: Norrbotten County
- Municipality: Pajala Municipality

Area
  - Total: 1.25 km^{2} (0.48 sq mi)

Population (31 December 2010)
  - Total: 529
  - Density: 423/km^{2} (1,100/sq mi)
- Time zone: UTC+1 (CET)
  - Summer (DST): UTC+2 (CEST)

Korpilombolo (Swedish pronunciation: [kɔrpɪˈlɔ̌mːbɔlɔ]; Meänkieli: Korpilompolo) is a locality situated in Pajala Municipality, Norrbotten County, Sweden with 529 inhabitants in 2010.

The band Goat state that they are from this town.
