= Långå Wind Farm =

Wind Park in Långåvålen

Långå wind park
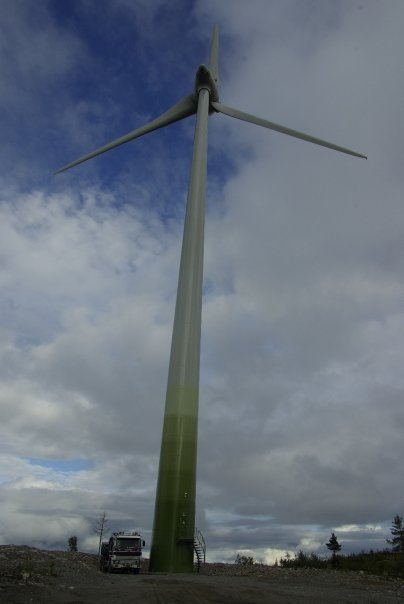
- Country: Sweden
- Location: Långåvålen, Jämtland County
- Coordinates: 62°28′10″N 13°16′55″E
- Status: planned
- Owner: Agrivind AB

Power generation
- Units operational: 5xEnercon 2 MW
- Nameplate capacity: 10 MW

The Långå wind park (Swedish: Långå Vindpark Härjedalen) is a wind farm in Långåvålen near the village of Långå in Härjedalen Municipality, Jämtland County, Sweden. It was built at a cost of 125 million Swedish kronor by Agrivind AB of Västergötland.

The park has five units (Långå 1 - 5), each German-manufactured Enercon turbines rated at 2000 kW. The turbines have a tower height of 85 metres (279 feet) and a total height of 125 metres (410 feet).

== See also ==
- List of power stations in Sweden
