= Clab =

Radioactive waste repository in Sweden

Coordinates: 57.412°N 16.655°E

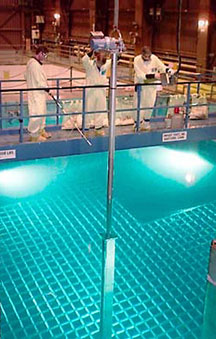
Spent nuclear fuel storage pool, similar to those at the Clab

The Clab, also known as Centralt mellanlager för använt kärnbränsle (Swedish for 'Central holding storage for spent nuclear fuel'), is an interim radioactive waste repository located at Oskarshamn Nuclear Power Plant about 25 km north of Oskarshamn. Clab used to be owned by Oskarshamnsverkets Kraftgrupp AB (OKG) but is now owned by Svensk Kärnbränslehantering Aktiebolag (SKB). It was opened in 1985 for the storage of spent nuclear fuel from all Swedish nuclear power plants. The fuel is stored for 30 to 40 years, in preparation for final storage.

The facility currently contains approximately 7,300 tons of high-level waste, submerged in 8 meters of water, in pools 30 meters below the surface. Contaminated reactor components, such as control rods, are also stored at the facility. Waste produced from Sweden's nuclear power plants will continue be stored at the facility until the Swedish Nuclear Fuel and Waste Management Company can complete construction of a more permanent storage site at Forsmark.

The facility contains an in-pool station where passive gamma-measurements can be done on spent nuclear fuel.
