= Goat (Swedish band) =

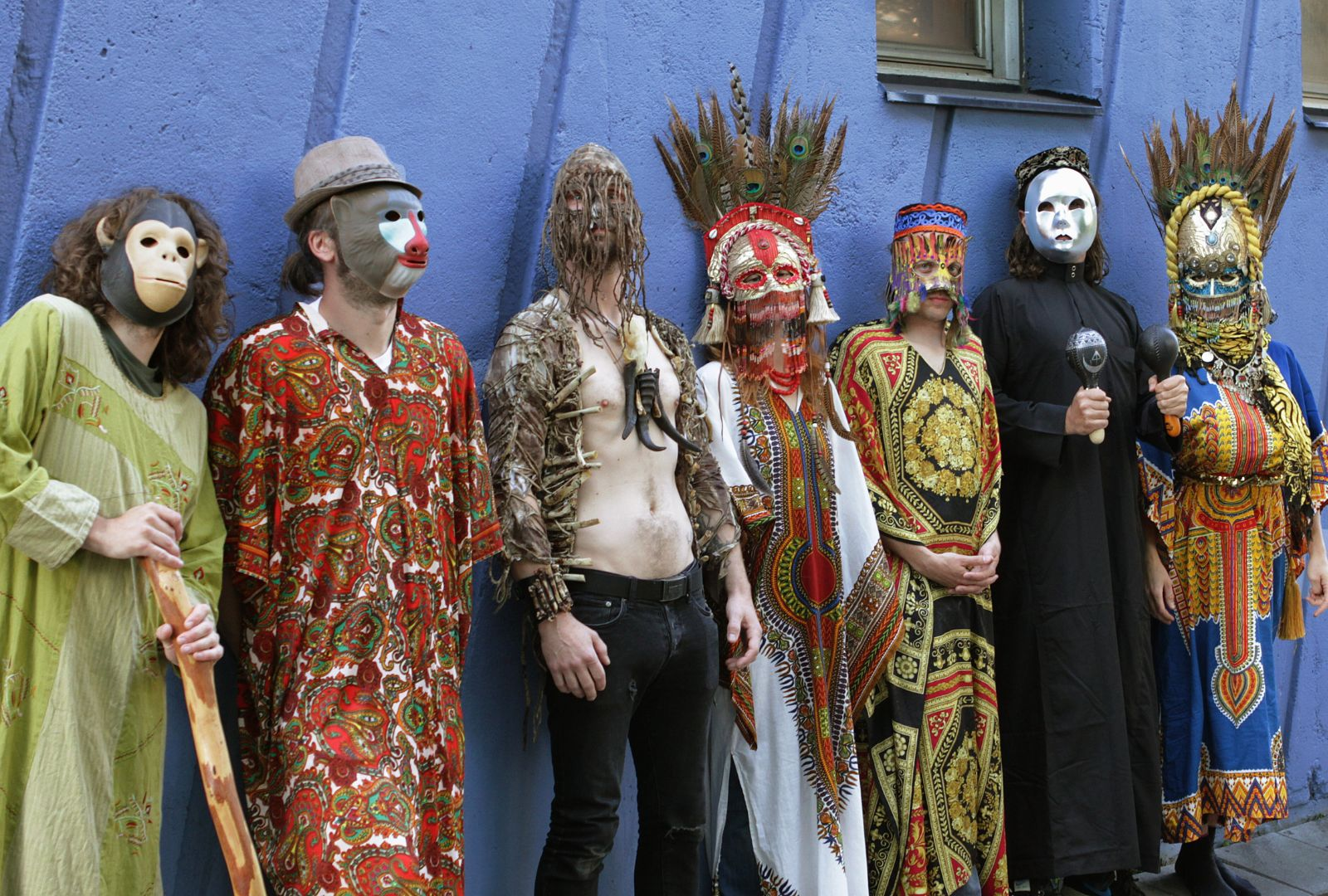

Background information
- Origin: Korpilombolo, Sweden
- Genres: Experimental rock, psychedelic rock, hard rock, afrobeat, worldbeat
- Labels: Rocket Recordings; Stranded Rekords; Sub Pop Records

Goat is a Swedish alternative and experimental fusion music group. The band originates—according to its own publicity—from Korpilombolo, Norrbotten County. The seven-piece band performs wearing masks and costumes, with each of the band members remaining anonymous.

To date, the band has released six studio albums: World Music (2012), Commune (2014), Requiem (2016), Oh Death (2022), Medicine (2023) and Goat (2024). In 2023, the band provided the score to the acclaimed BBC/A24 drama series, The Gallows Pole, directed by Shane Meadows.

== History ==
=== Formation ===
Goat, though currently based in Gothenburg, claims to hail from Korpilombolo in Sweden which, according to the band's own publicity, has a history of voodoo worship after a witch doctor came and lived there. Supposedly, when Christian crusaders came and destroyed the village the surviving people fled and placed a curse on the town. This has been described as "a lovely story, if possibly not entirely rooted in reality."

The band started playing music when they were children, as part of a local community tradition, and there have been many incarnations of Goat who have recorded over the last "30 or 40 years". There are now three original "core" members of the band, from Korpilombolo, but in live concerts they are augmented by four other performers from Gothenburg.

=== Recording career ===
The group signed to Rocket Recordings, a UK-based record label formed in 1998. In 2012, they released their debut single "Goatman" on limited edition vinyl, and began recording their first album. Commenting on the writing process, a band member said:

"The songwriting process is strange. Normally, when we play together we don't play songs – we make music – and every time we play is a new time. When we had the possibility to record, we have made songs for the album. It started with the song 'Goatman', and that song was recorded just for us. Then Rocket [Recordings] asked us to write some more and we continued. Our songs are never really finished and we never know how they will end up when we start recording."

World Music was released on 20 August 2012 and has won good responses and international attention, including the Australian music publication Happy Mag placing the album at no.5 on their list of "The 25 greatest psychedelic rock albums of the 2010s". The title of the album comes from the different styles of music on the album. Goat commented:

"We've been taught since we were small to have an understanding of not only western bands, but of music from other parts of the world. The title World Music was chosen because we believe we play 'world music', and that's what we think everyone plays".

== Performances ==
The band performs wearing masks and costumes.

After touring the United States in early 2013 the band played at that year's Glastonbury Festival and the final holiday camp edition of All Tomorrow's Parties festival in Camber Sands, England. In 2014, they played at the Coachella Valley Music and Arts Festival in Indio, California and the Latitude Festival in Southwold, Suffolk, England. In 2015, they played again at the Glastonbury Festival, at Roskilde Festival in Denmark and Pukkelpop in Belgium. In 2016 the band played, amongst others, at Primavera Sound in Barcelona, Cactusfestival in Bruges, and End of the Road Festival in Wiltshire, England. The band played support for Foo Fighters at Ullevi Stadium in Gothenburg on 5 June 2018. The band performed a headline set in the Far Out tent at the 2023 Green Man Festival in Wales. They returned to Glastonbury in 2025 and played on the West Holts stage.

== Discography ==
=== Studio albums ===
Title	Details	Peak chart positions	
Title	Details	SWE	UK
World Music	Release date: 20 August 2012; Record label: Stranded (Sweden), Rocket (UK); Format: CD, vinyl, digital download	8	—
Commune	Release date: 23 September 2014; Record label: Sub Pop, Rocket, Stranded; Format: CD, vinyl, digital download	17	47
Requiem	Release date: 7 October 2016; Record label: Sub Pop, Rocket, Stranded; Format: CD, vinyl, digital download	—	49
Oh Death	Release date: 21 October 2022; Record label: Sub Pop, Rocket, Stranded; Format: CD, vinyl, digital download	—	—
Medicine	Release date: 13 October 2023; Record label: Sub Pop, Rocket, Stranded; Format: CD, vinyl, digital download	53	—
Goat	Release date: 11 October 2024; Record label: Rocket; Format: CD, vinyl, digital download		

=== Live albums ===
Title	Details
Live Ballroom Ritual	Release date: 2 December 2013; Record label: Rocket; Format: CD, vinyl, digital download
Fuzzed in Europe	Release date: 27 October 2017; Record label: Rocket; Format: Vinyl, digital download
Levitation Sessions	Release date: 8 December 2023; Record label: Levitation; Format: Vinyl, cassette

=== Compilation albums ===
Title	Details	Peak chart positions
Title	Details	UK
Headsoup	Release date: 27 August 2021; Record label: Rocket; Format: CD, vinyl, digital download	48

=== Soundtracks ===
Title	Details
Double Date	Release date: 21 April 2018; Record label: Rocket; Format: 10" vinyl

Title	Details
The Gallows Pole: Original Score	Release date: 7 July 2023 / 20 April 2024; Record label: Rocket; Format: Download / 12" + 7" vinyl (RSD 2024)

=== EPs and singles ===
- 2012: "Goatman/The Sun the Moon" (7" limited edition)
- 2012: "The Sun the Moon"/"Goathead" (cassette, limited edition)
- 2012: "First Sonic Ritual" (CD, limited edition)
- 2013: "Run to Your Mama Remixes Vol.1" (12", limited edition)
- 2013: "Run to Your Mama Remixes Vol.2" (12", limited edition)
- 2013: "Stonegoat"/"Dreambuilding" (7", 12")
- 2014: "Hide from the Sun" / "Dig My Grave" (7")
- 2014: "Al Lover X Goat" (12", limited edition)
- 2015: "Time for Fun" / "Relax" (7")
- 2016: "I Sing in Silence" / "The Snake of Addis Ababa" (7")
- 2017: "Goatfuzz / Goatfizz" (7")
- 2017 "Try My Robe" (Live)
- 2018: "Let it Burn" / "Friday, Pt. 1" (7")
- 2021: "Queen of the Underground"
- 2021: "Fill My Mouth"
- 2022: "Under No Nation"
- 2022: "Do The Dance"
- 2023: "Do The Dance (Shit & Shine Rework)"
- 2023: "Seu Sangue" (EP)
- 2025: ”Nimerudi” feat MC Yallah
- 2025: ”Light as a feather/Ship of fools W/ Graveyard

== In popular culture ==
The band's single "Let It Burn" was featured in The Grand Tour third season, episode 5, in which James May tested the Alpine A110. "Let It Burn" was also featured in the credits of AMC's Mayfair Witches Season 1 Episode 7.

Their music was featured in the 2017 British independent horror film, Double Date. The band also played a cameo of themselves.

"Run To Your Mama" is the title track for Season 1 of the podcast series, Crimetown.

Let it Burn featured in the soundtrack to the BBC dramatisation of The Gallows Pole.
