= Medicine (Goat album) =

Studio album by Goat
- Released: 13 October 2023
- Length: 39:58
- Label: Rocket

Goat chronology
Oh Death (2022)	Medicine (2023)

Singles from Medicine
- 1. "Unemployment Office" Released: 8 August 2023

Medicine is the sixth studio album by Swedish experimental rock band Goat. It was released on 13 October 2023 by Rocket Recordings.

== Background ==
On 8 August 2023, Goat announced the release of their sixth studio album, along with the first single Unemployment Office. The music video for Unemployment Office was directed by Oliver Lewis.

== Critical reception ==
Professional ratings
Aggregate scores
Source	Rating
Metacritic	78/100
Review scores
Source	Rating
AllMusic	4/5 stars
Classic Rock	3.5/5 stars
Sputnikmusic	4/5 stars

Medicicine was met with "generally favorable" reviews from critics. At Metacritic, which assigns a weighted average rating out of 100 to reviews from mainstream publications, this release received an average score of 78, based on 7 reviews.

== Track listing ==
Medicine track listing
No.	Title	Length
1.	"Impermanence & Death"	6:35
2.	"Raised by Hills"	3:19
3.	"I Became the Unemployment Office"	5:13
4.	"TSOD"	3:16
5.	"Vakna"	5:42
6.	"You'll Be Alright"	3:38
7.	"Join the Resistance"	5:36
8.	"Tripping in the Graveyard"	6:36

== Charts ==
Chart performance for Medicine
Chart (2023)	Peak position
Scottish Albums (Official Charts)	40
Swedish Albums (Sverigetopplistan)	53
UK Album Downloads (Official Charts)	9
UK Independent Albums (Official Charts)	15
UK Progressive Albums (Official Charts)	3
