= Tärendö =

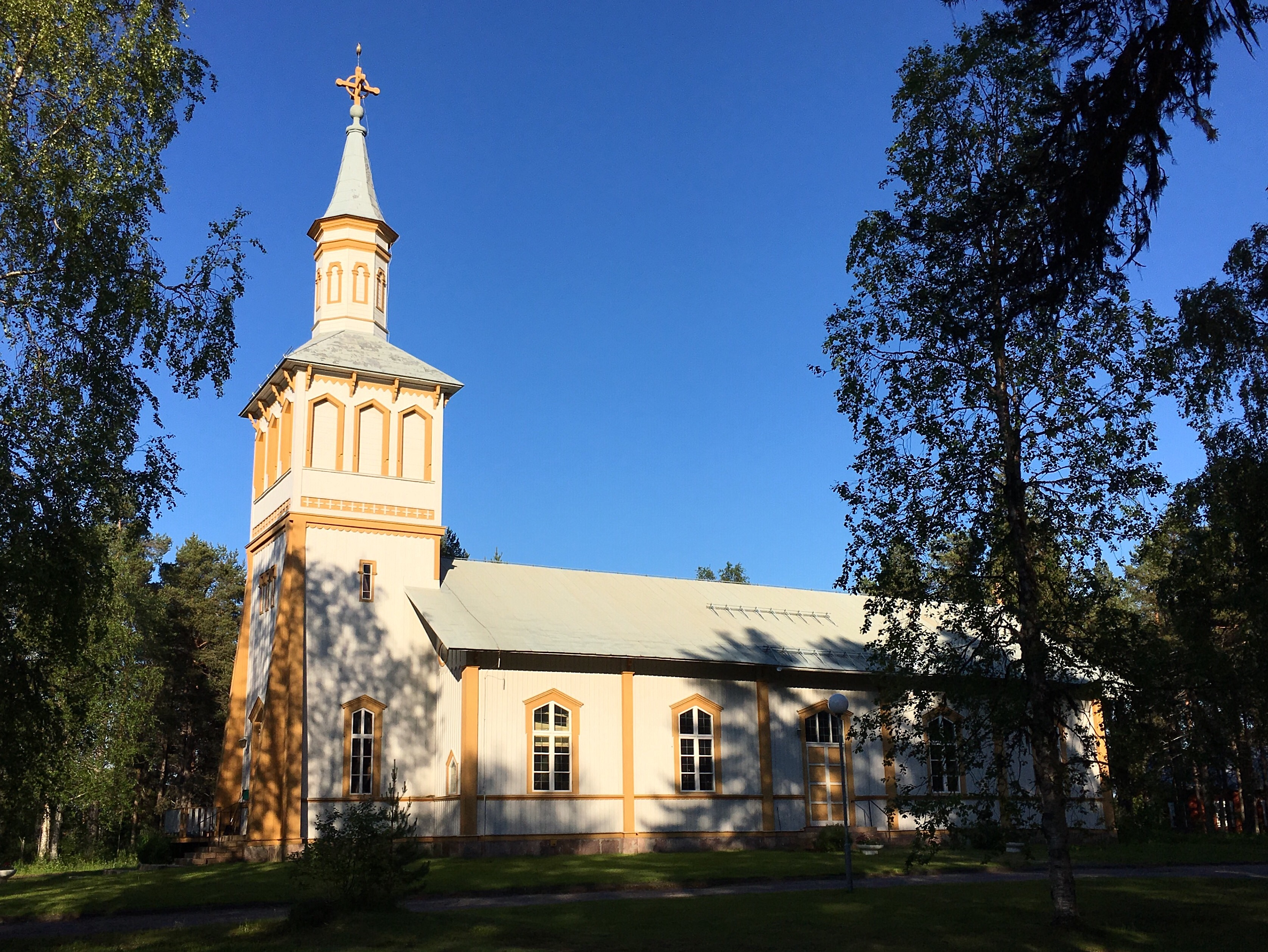
- Tärendö Church

- Location within Norrbotten Location within Sweden
- Coordinates: 67°20′N 22°37′E
- Country: Sweden
- Province: Norrbotten
- County: Norrbotten County
- Municipality: Pajala Municipality

Area
  - Total: 0.39 km^{2} (0.15 sq mi)

Population (2000)
  - Total: 208
  - Density: 527/km^{2} (1,360/sq mi)
- Time zone: UTC+1 (CET)
  - Summer (DST): UTC+2 (CEST)
- Website: http://www.tarendo.nu

Tärendö (Swedish pronunciation: [ˈtæ̌rːɛndœ], Meänkieli: Täräntö ) is a small locality in Norrbotten County, Sweden with 208 inhabitants in 2000. It is located at the Kalix River and the bifurcation Tärendö River.

The village was probably founded around year 1620. The largest employer today is the saw mill. The nearest airports are Pajala Airport, 28 km away and Gällivare Airport, 101 km away.

A well known person from Tärendö is the Olympic gold medalist in cross-country skiing Charlotte Kalla. There is also a line of IKEA furniture named after the village.
