= Johan Nissinen =

Swedish politician (born 1989)

Johan Nissinen MEP
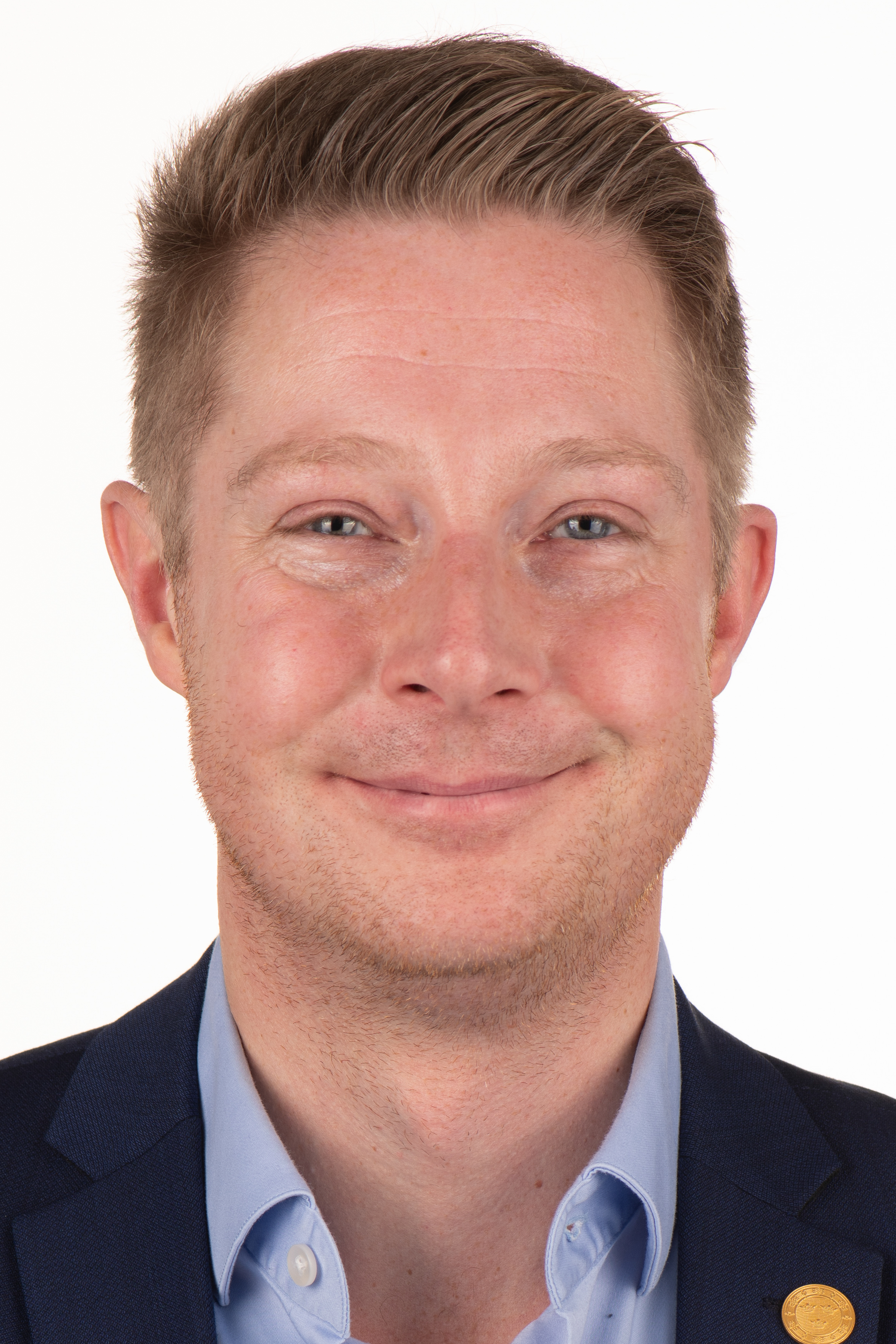

Member of the European Parliament
- Incumbent
- Assumed office October 2022
- Preceded by: Jessica Stegrud

Member of the Riksdag
- In office 29 September 2014 – 11 September 2022
- Constituency: Skåne NE

Personal details
- Born: Johan Harry Nissinen; 17 May 1989 (age 37) Värnamo, Sweden
- Party: People’s List (since 2024)
- Other political affiliations: Sweden Democrats (until 2024)

Johan Harry Nissinen (born 17 May 1989) is a Swedish politician who was elected as a member of the Riksdag in 2014 and since 2022 has been a Member of the European Parliament.

He served on the executive board for the Sweden Democrats in Finnveden before becoming a municipal councilor in Värnamo. During the 2014 Swedish general election, he was elected to parliament representing the Skåne Northern and Eastern constituency and served on the EU committee in parliament. Nissinen did not contest the 2022 election but instead was appointed to replace Jessica Stegrud in the European Parliament after she was elected to the Riksdag.

On 2 May 2024, Nissinen left the Sweden Democrats and joined the newly started People's List.
