= Læstadiuspörtet =

Museum in Sweden

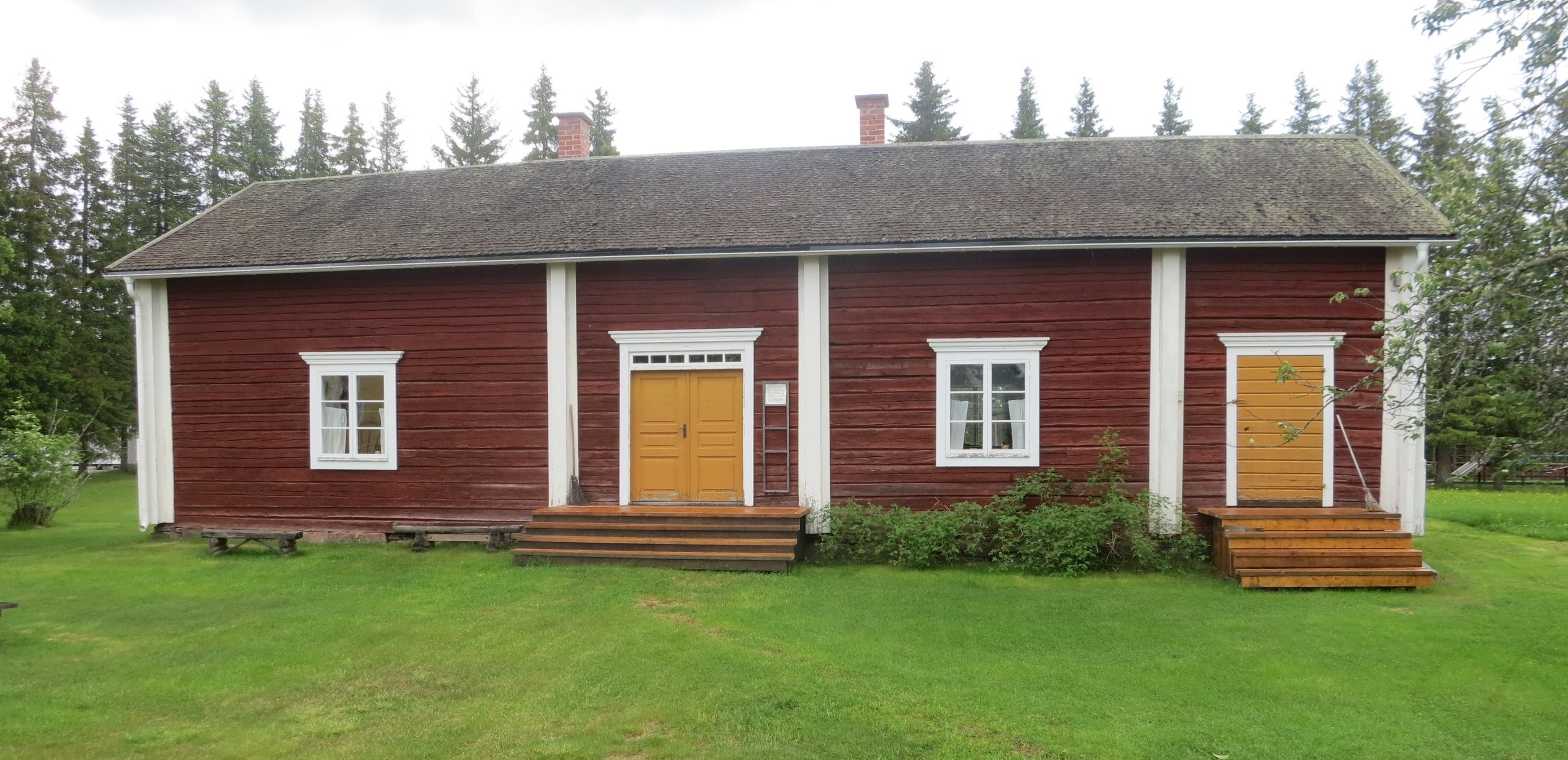
- Læstadiuspörtet in 2015
- Interactive map of the Læstadiuspörtet area

General information
- Location: Pajala, Sweden
- Coordinates: 67.21055°N 23.37942°E

Website
- Laestadiusmuseet

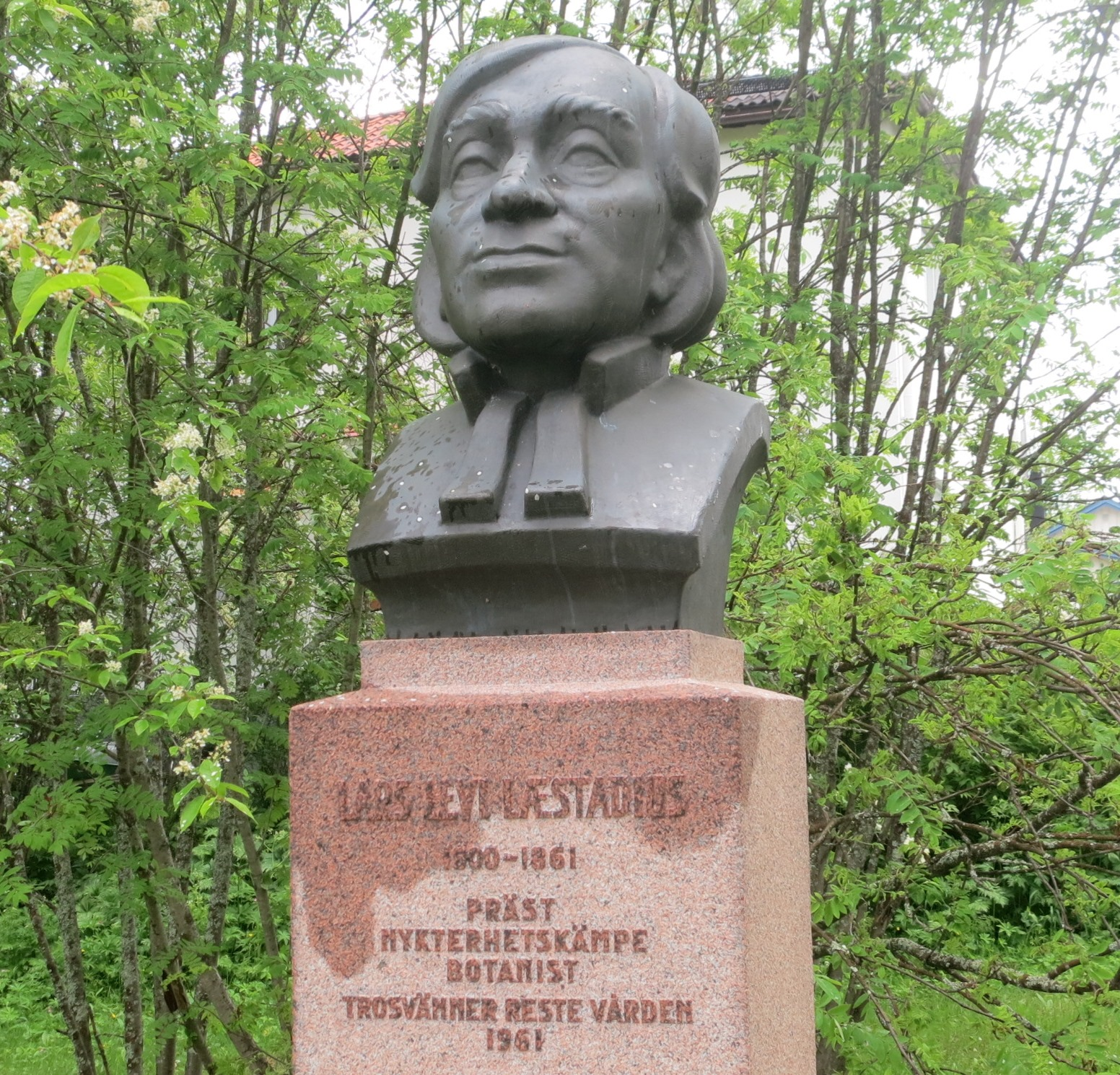
Lars Levi Laestadius

Læstadiuspörtet is a rectory in the form of a cottage built of red timber located in Pajala Municipality, Sweden. Læstadiuspörtet was the home of the Swedish Lutheran pastor of Sámi descent and founder of Laestadianism, Lars Levi Laestadius, from 1851 until his death here in 1861, and now serves as the Laestadius Museum.
