= Kari River =

Location
- Country: Sweden

Kari River, locally known as Karijoki, is a river of Sweden. It is a left-bank tributary of the Tärendö River.
