= Storrun wind farm =

Wind farm in Sweden

Storrun Wind Farm
- Country: Sweden
- Location: Krokom, Jämtland
- Coordinates: 63°45′32″N 13°35′17″E
- Status: Operational
- Commission date: 2009
- Owner: Storrun Vindkraft AB

Power generation
- Units operational: 12 Nordex 2.5 MW N90
- Nameplate capacity: 30 MW

Storrun Wind Farm is a 30 MW wind farm in Krokom in Jämtland, Sweden. The wind farm was opened on 26 September 2009. It consists of 12 Nordex 2.5 MW N90 wind turbines. The developer and operator of the wind farm is Storrun Vindkraft AB, a joint venture of Ørsted A/S (80%) and Borevind AB (20%). The wind farm covers an area of approximately 2.6 square kilometres (1.0 sq mi) and average wind speed at the 80 metres (260 ft) hub height is 7.3 metres per second (24 ft/s). Due to the northern location, the project includes anti-ice coated blades and estimation of production losses caused by icing. The wind farm was sold in 2014 to the Australian pension fund Prime Super.

== See also ==
- List of large wind farms
- List of wind farms in Sweden
