= Requiem (Goat album) =

Studio album by Goat
- Released: October 7, 2016
- Recorded: Parkeringshuset Studio
- Genres: Experimental rock, psychedelic rock, afrobeat, worldbeat, world fusion
- Length: 63:19
- Label: Rocket Recordings
- Producer: Goat

Goat chronology
Commune (2014)	Requiem (2016)	Oh Death (2022)

Requiem is the third studio album by the Swedish experimental fusion band Goat, released on October 7, 2016 on Rocket Recordings. It was self-produced by the band and recorded at Parkeringshuset Studio.

== Reception ==
Requiem received positive reviews upon its release. At Metacritic, which assigns a normalized rating out of 100 to reviews from mainstream critics, the album has received an average score of 75, based on 20 reviews, indicating "generally favourable" reviews.

== Track listing ==
All tracks are written by Goat, except where noted.

No.	Title	Writer(s)	Length
1.	"Djôrôlen / Union of Sun and Moon"	Oumou Sangaré / Goat	4:18
2.	"I Sing in Silence"		4:14
3.	"Temple Rhythms"		4:18
4.	"Alarms"		2:54
5.	"Trouble in the Streets"		4:20
6.	"Psychedelic Lover"		3:56
7.	"Goatband"		7:50
8.	"Try My Robe"		3:30
9.	"It's Not Me"		3:20
10.	"All-Seeing Eye"		2:42
11.	"Goatfuzz"		6:56
12.	"Goodbye"		7:54
13.	"Ubuntu"		7:07
Total length:			63:19

The lyrics of "Union of Sun and Moon" are from the Tibetan Buddhist tantra Union of the Sun and Moon.

== Personnel ==
- Goat - musicians, production, recording
- Maher Cissoko - kora on "Goodbye"
- Henryk Lipp - mastering
- Andreas Johansson - cover photograph
- Chris Reeder - sleeve design
