= Jukkas River =

Location
- Country: Sweden

The Jukkas River, locally known as Jukkasjoki, is a small river in northern Sweden. It is a right-bank tributary of the Tärendö River.

== See also ==
- Jukkasjärvi
