= Aapua Wind Farm =

Wind farm in Sweden

- Country: Sweden
- Coordinates: 66°51′45″N 23°32′14″E
- Status: Operational
- Commission date: 2005

Power generation
- Units operational: 7 × 1.5 MW
- Make and model: Vestas V82-1.5 MW (7)
- Nameplate capacity: 9.9 MW

The Aapua wind farm (Swedish: Aapua-parken) is a wind farm on Eta, southwest of Aapua, Övertorneå municipality in Norrbotten County, Sweden. As of 2007, it is the northernmost wind windfarm in Sweden. The farm is owned by Aapua Vind AB, representing 14 private investors, and operates on land owned by the state-owned Sveaskog, Sweden's largest forest owner. The farm became operational in 2005

== Technical ==
The farm consists of seven 1.5 MW Vestas V82-1.5 MW Arctic wind turbines with a total stated power of 9.9 MW (10.5 MW according to supplier Vestas). Each unit has a nacelle height of 78 m and a rotor diameter of 82 m.

== See also ==
- List of wind farms in Sweden
