= Meras River =

River in Sweden

Meras River, locally known as Merasjoki, is a river of Sweden and a right-bank tributary of the Tärendö River. It flows southeast from its source at Lake Merasjärvi.
