= Commune (album) =

Studio album by Goat
- Released: 22 September 2014
- Genres: Psychedelic rock; experimental rock; worldbeat; acid rock; neo-psychedelia
- Length: 38:52
- Label: Sub Pop
- Producer: Goat

Goat chronology
World Music (2012)	Commune (2014)	Requiem (2016)

Commune is the second studio album by Swedish experimental fusion group Goat. It was released worldwide on 22 September 2014 by Rocket Recordings, in North America on 23 September by Sub Pop, and in Scandinavia on 24 September by Stranded Records. The group also embarked on a small promotional tour across Europe in support of the album, which began on September 19 in Copenhagen, Denmark and ended on October 3 at the Roundhouse in London, England.

== Track listing ==
All tracks are written by Goat

No.	Title	Length
1.	"Talk to God"	6:39
2.	"Words"	3:06
3.	"The Light Within"	2:57
4.	"To Travel the Path Unknown"	2:29
5.	"Goatchild"	4:01
6.	"Goatslaves"	4:45
7.	"Hide from the Sun"	3:36
8.	"Bondye"	5:01
9.	"Gathering of Ancient Tribes"	6:18
Total length:		38:52

Bonus 7" with vinyl edition
No.	Title	Length
1.	"Dig My Grave"	3:16

== Reception ==
Professional ratings
Aggregate scores
Source	Rating
Metacritic	76/100
Review scores
Source	Rating
AllMusic	4/5 stars
Clash	7/10
DIY	4/5 stars
Drowned in Sound	7/10
The Guardian	4/5 stars
musicOMH	4/5 stars
NME	8/10
Pitchfork	7.3/10
The Skinny	4/5 stars
Uncut	7/10

Commune received generally favorable reviews, with a score of 76/100 on Metacritic. The album was listed on several publications' best albums of 2014 lists.

=== Accolades ===
Publication/Author	Country	Accolade	Year	Rank
Gigwise	United Kingdom	50 Best Albums of 2014	2014	10
NME	United Kingdom	Top 50 Albums of 2014	2014	36
The Skinny	United Kingdom	Albums of 2014	2014	23
Time Out London	United Kingdom	30 Best Albums of 2014	2014	4
Uncut	United Kingdom	Top 75 Albums of 2014	2014	53

== Charts ==
Chart (2014)	Peak position
Belgian Albums (Ultratop Flanders)	100
Swedish Albums (Sverigetopplistan)	17
UK Albums (Official Charts)	47
UK Independent Albums (Official Charts)	10
US Billboard 200	139
US Independent Albums (Billboard)	30
US Top Heatseekers Albums (Billboard)	5
US Top Rock Albums (Billboard)	41
