= Swedish Nuclear Fuel and Waste Management Company =

Swedish nuclear waste management organisation

- Company type: Radioactive Waste Management
- Website: http://www.skb.com/

The Swedish Nuclear Fuel and Waste Management Company (Svensk Kärnbränslehantering Aktiebolag, abbreviated SKB) is a company founded by the Swedish nuclear power industry. Among its primary operations are the management and disposal of nuclear waste and expended nuclear fuel. Its main offices are in Stockholm, but the company has sites in Forsmark and Oskarshamn (Äspölaboratoriet and Kapsellaboratoriet). The nuclear waste disposal vessel M/S Sigyn is owned SKB.

== Owners ==
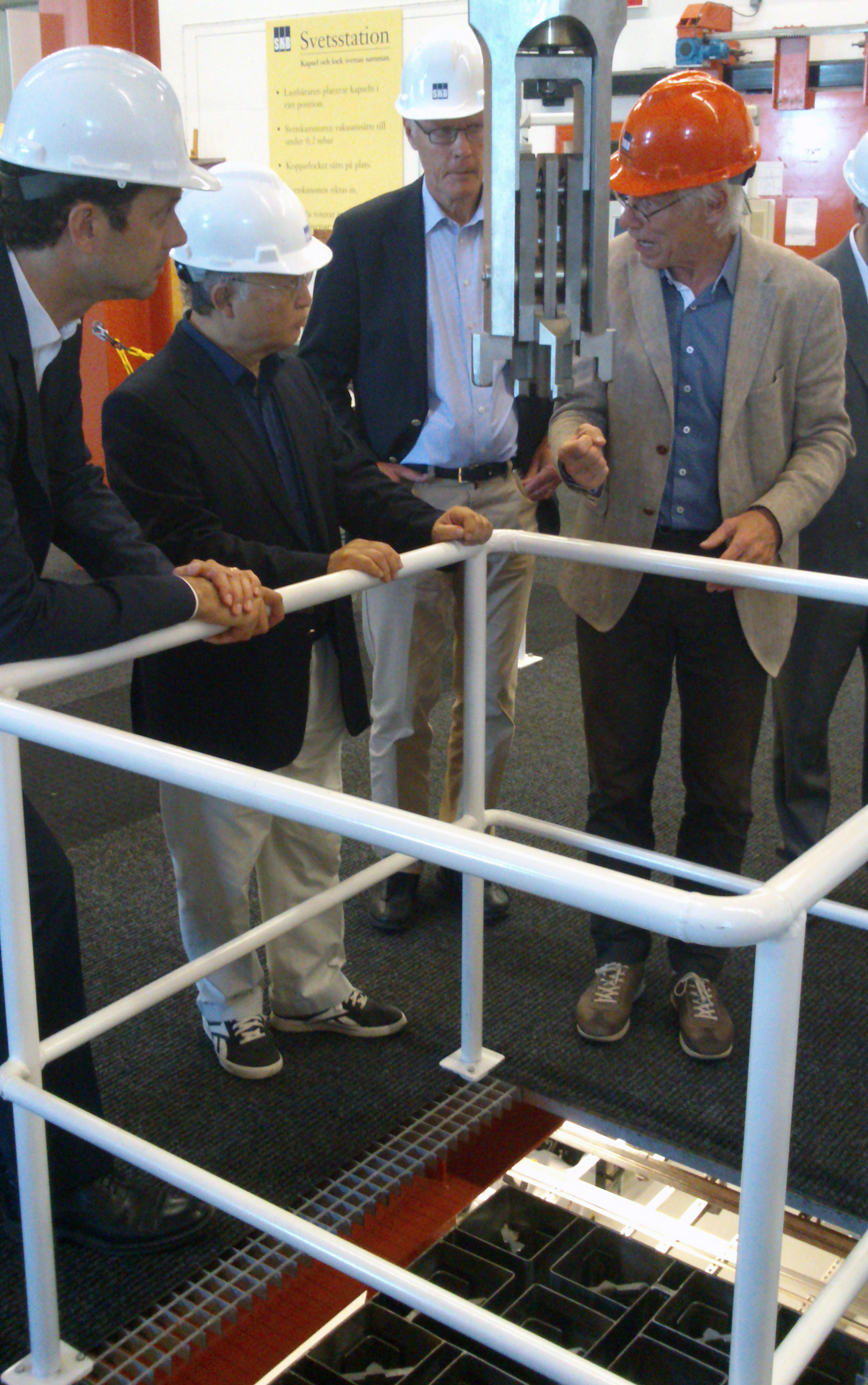
IAEA Director General Yukiya Amano visits the SKB Canister Laboratory in Oskarshamn, Sweden.

Company name	Percentage
Vattenfall	36%
Forsmarks Kraftgrupp AB	30%
OKG Aktiebolag	22%
E.ON Kärnkraft Sverige AB	12%
	100%
Source: | As of 2013-04-24

== Board of directors ==
Position	Name	Company/Organization/Trade union
Chairman	Torbjörn Wahlborg	Vattenfall AB
Member	Per-Göran Nilsson	Forsmarks Kraftgrupp AB
Member	Henrik Nebrelius	E.ON Kärnkraft Sverige AB
Member	Ingemar Engkvist	E.ON Kärnkraft Sverige AB
Member	Lars Björnkvist	Ringhals AB
Member	Anders Wijkman	
Ledamot	Thomas Östros	
Employee representative	Fredrik De la Gardie	Unionen
Employee representative	Martina Sturek	Sveriges Ingenjörer
Source: | As of 2013-04-24

== See also ==
- Swedish Waste Management (Avfall Sverige)
