= World Music (Goat album) =

Studio album by Goat
- Released: 20 August 2012
- Recorded: 2012
- Genre: Psychedelic rock
- Length: 37:39
- Label: Rocket Recordings

Goat chronology
World Music (2012)	Commune (2014)

Singles from World Music
- 1. "Goatman" Released: 20 February 2012

Professional ratings
Aggregate scores
Source	Rating
Metacritic	87/100
Review scores
Source	Rating
The Austin Chronicle	4/5 stars
Clash	8/10
Drowned in Sound	7/10
Gaffa (Swedish edition)	3/6 stars
The Guardian	5/5 stars
The Line of Best Fit	8/10
MusicOMH	4/5 stars
Pitchfork	8.1/10
PopMatters	8/10

World Music is the debut album by Swedish alternative band Goat that was released on 20 August 2012 on Stranded Rekords (Sweden) and Rocket Recordings (UK). It was described by The Guardian as "one of 2012's biggest underground rock albums".

The album entered the Swedish Albums Chart at number 8 on week ending 19 October 2012.

== Track listing ==
1. "Diarabi" (2:56)
2. "Goatman" (4:15)
3. "Goathead" (5:40)
4. "Disco Fever" (4:24)
5. "Golden Dawn" (2:50)
6. "Let It Bleed" (3:54)
7. "Run to Your Mama" (2:22)
8. "Goatlord" (3:04)
9. "Det som aldrig förändras / Diarabi" (7:44)

== Charts ==
Chart (2012)	Peak position
Swedish Albums (Sverigetopplistan)	8
