= Sigyn Glacier =

Glacier in Antarctica

- Location of Queen Maud Land in Antarctica

- Location within Antarctica
- Location: Queen Maud Land
- Coordinates: 71°52′S 8°36′E
- Thickness: unknown
- Terminus: Drygalski Mountains
- Status: unknown

Sigyn Glacier is a broad glacier flowing north between the Drygalski Mountains and the Kurze Mountains in Queen Maud Land. It was mapped and named from surveys and air photos by Norwegian Antarctic Expedition (1956–60) after Sigyn in Norse mythology.

== See also ==
- List of glaciers in the Antarctic
- Glaciology
