= OKG AB =

Swedish nuclear power company

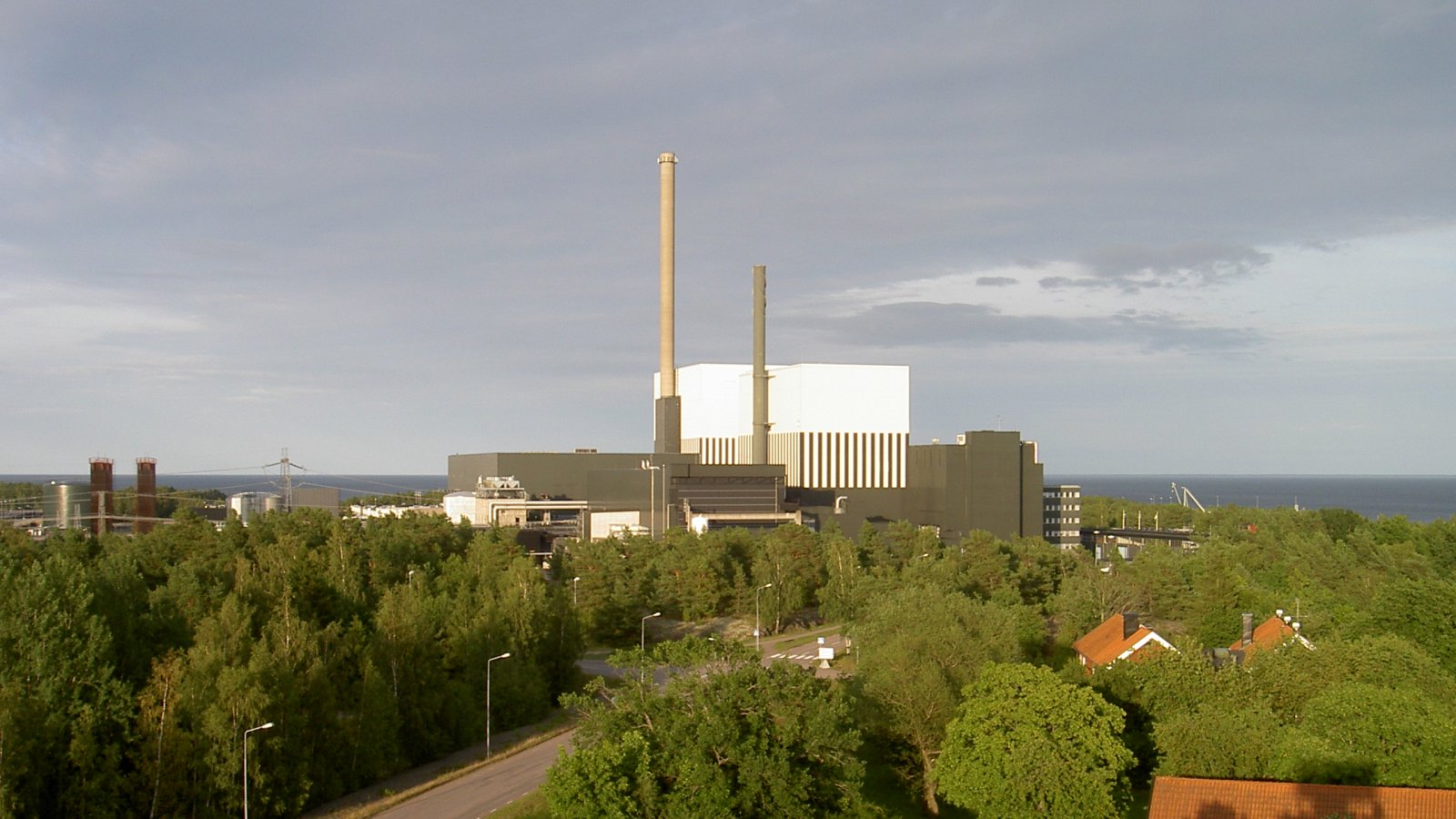
The power plants at Simpevarp

OKG AB (Oskarshamns Kraftgrupp AB) is a Swedish corporation who owns and operates the Oskarshamn Nuclear Power Plant. It is majority owned by Sydkraft.

The three reactors, Oskarshamn 1–3, manufactured by ASEA Atom, were put into operation in 1972, 1974, and 1985, respectively. At the reactor site, some 30 km north of Oskarshamn, OKG used to operate CLAB – Sweden's central interim storage facility for radioactive waste. From October 2006, however, CLAB was transferred to SKB (Svensk Kärnbränslehantering AB, known also as Swedish Nuclear Fuel and Waste Management Company).

== Nuclear reactors ==
All three reactors are boiling water reactors (BWRs). As of 2006, the maximum output for Oskarshamn 1 and 2 is 495 MW (O1) and 625 MW (O2). The most recent reactor, O3, will be upgraded from 1,200 MW to 1,450 MW in 2009. OKG estimates that O1, O2, and O3 combined account for ten percent of the total electricity generation in Sweden.

On 14 October 2015 during an extra shareholder meeting, the decision was made to close both reactors O1 and O2 prematurely due to the low price of electricity and raised penalty tax for nuclear power.

== See also ==
- Nuclear power in Sweden
