= Swedish Waste Management =

Waste management and recycling in Sweden

Swedish Waste Management (Swedish: Avfall Sverige) is a public association for waste management and recycling in Sweden. Established in 1947, it is headquartered in Malmö with a main branch in Stockholm. Its main vision is zero waste. Tony Clark is its managing director since 2019. It is a member of the Municipal Waste Europe, an umbrella organisation of public waste management bodies in European countries that was established in 2008. Since 2022, it partnered with the United Nations Development Programme (UNDP) for "global climate mitigation and adaptation efforts and the implementation of the 2030 Agenda for Sustainable Development."

The Swedish Waste Management has made Sweden one of the most efficient and effective countries in waste management. As of 2020, Sweden produces about 152 million tonnes of waste, most of which (76%) are from mining and some (less than 1%) are hazardous that could not be processed. Only 0.7% of the total household and industrial waste is disposed, and the rest is recycled. Sweden imports about two million tonnes of waste from neighbouring countries to make profitable recycling products. As of 2023 report, Sweden generated 1.7 billion euros in 2020 (the highest so far was 1.98 billion euros in 2016) from recycling waste.

In 1975, the waste recycling accounted for only 38% of the total waste. The Swedish government introduced more effective policies in the 1990s. By 2018, more than 99% of the wastes were recycled. The Swedish Waste Management and other waste recycling agencies used up the wastes so much that since 2010, Sweden started importing garbage mainly from Great Britain and Norway. By 2015, about 950,000 homes are heated and 260,000 homes received electricity from reusing the waste.

History and policy

Sweden's modern waste management system developed through government policies aimed at reducing landfill use and recovering energy from waste. During the 2000s, Sweden introduced a landfill tax and restrictions on disposing of combustible and organic waste in landfills. These policies encouraged the development of alternative waste treatment methods, particularly recycling and incineration with energy recovery. Municipalities are responsible for managing household waste, including its collection, recycling, and disposal. Research on Swedish waste policies has also found that separate food waste collection can encourage recycling of other materials by influencing household waste habits.

Criticism and challenges

Despite its low landfill rates, Sweden's waste management system faces challenges concerning recycling and its reliance on incineration. The European Union's waste hierarchy prioritizes waste prevention, reuse, and material recycling over energy recovery and disposal. Incineration generates heat and electricity, but it does not recover materials in the same way as conventional recycling. According to the Organization for Economic Co-operation and Development (OECD), only 40% of Sweden's municipal waste was prepared for reuse or recycled in 2022, below the European Union's 2025 recycling target of 55%.

Sweden also imports waste from other countries for energy recovery. Research by Olofsson and colleagues found that waste imports increased partly because Sweden had established infrastructure for converting waste into energy through district heating systems. Other factors included landfill restrictions in exporting countries and differences in waste treatment costs. Although importing waste provides fuel for energy production, it also raises questions about the environmental impacts of transporting and burning waste. These challenges demonstrate that low landfill rates do not necessarily indicate high levels of material recycling.
