= Oskarshamn Nuclear Power Plant =

Nuclear power plant in Sweden

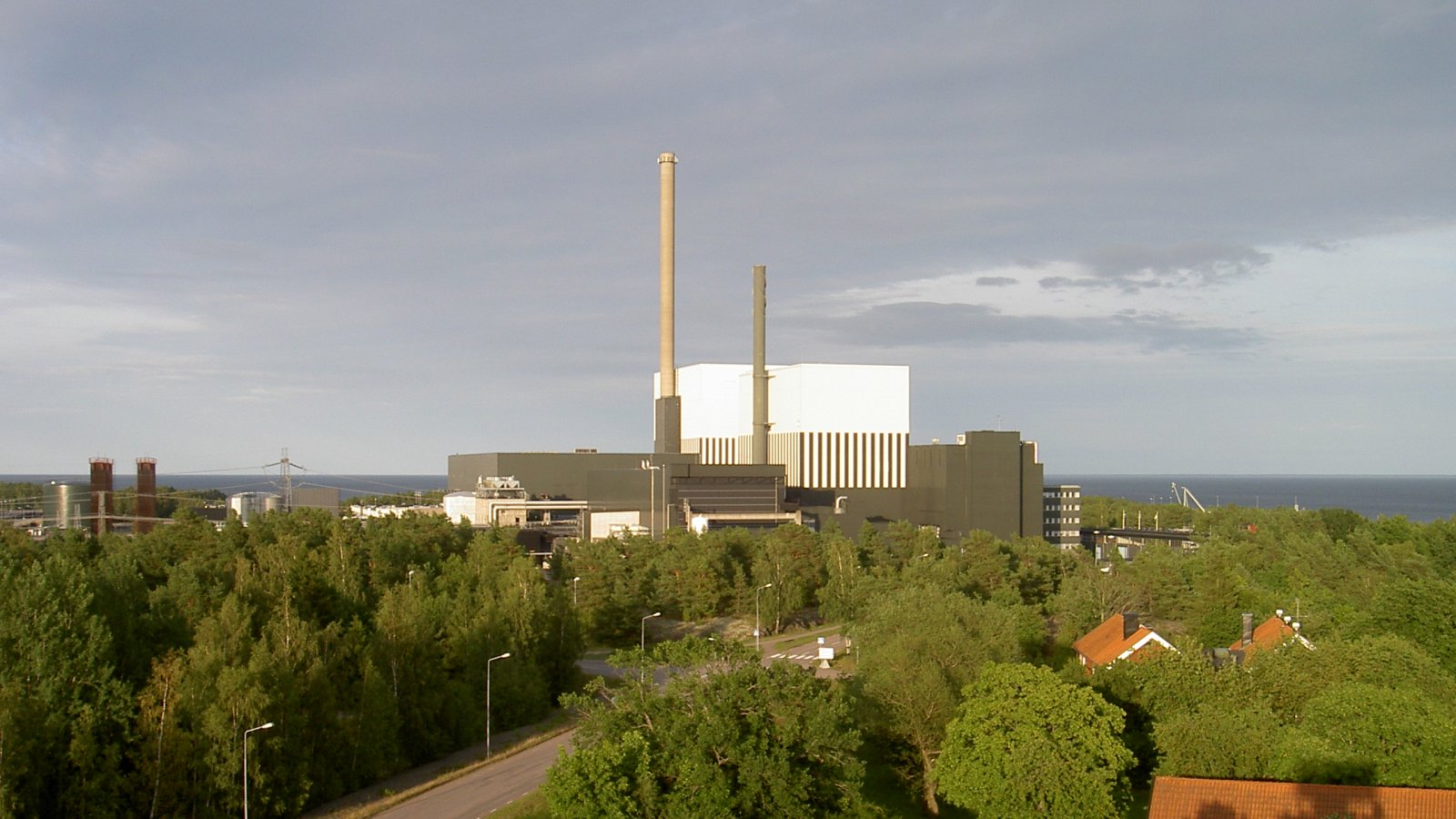
- Oskarshamn NPP
- Country: Sweden
- Coordinates: 57°24′56″N 16°40′16″E
- Status: Operational
- Construction began: 1965
- Commission date: O1: February 6, 1972; O2: January 1, 1975; O3: August 15, 1985
- Decommission date: O1: June 17, 2017; O2: October 14, 2015
- Owner: OKG AB
- Operators: OKG Aktiebolag (Uniper SE 54.5%, Fortum 45.5%)
- Cooling source: Kalmar Strait

Power generation
- Units operational: 1 × 1,450 MW_{e}
- Units decommissioned: 1 × 494 MW_{e} 1 × 664 MW_{e}
- Nameplate capacity: 1,400 MW; 2,500 MW
- Capacity factor: 68.9%
- Annual net output: 11 TWh

External links
- Website: www.okg.se/en/About-OKG/Facilities/
- Commons: Related media on Commons

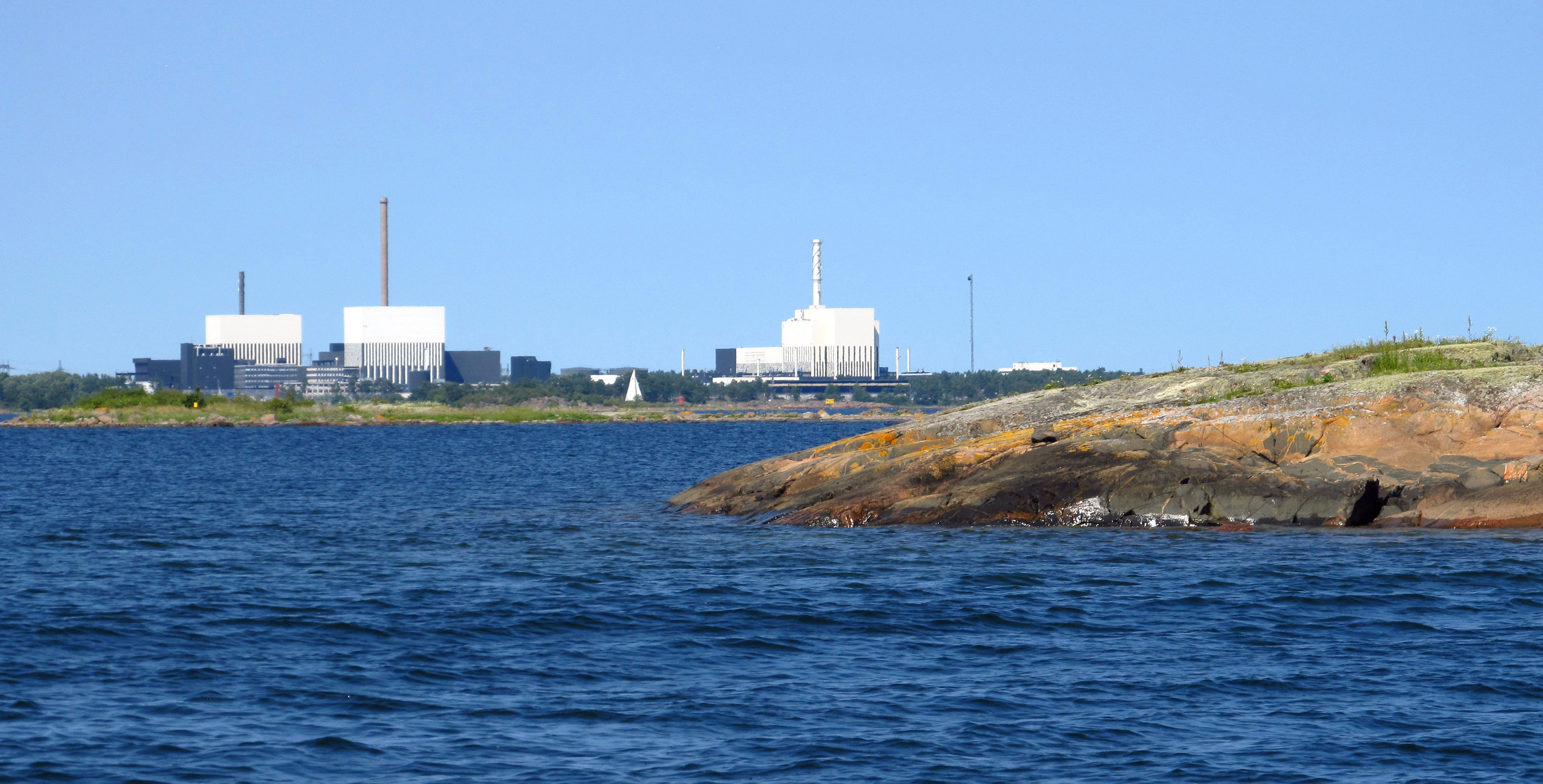
Oskarshamn reactor O1, O2 and O3.

The Oskarshamn Nuclear Power Plant is one of three active nuclear power stations in Sweden. The plant is about 25 kilometers (16 mi) north of Oskarshamn, in Simpervarp directly at the Kalmarsund at the Baltic Sea coast and with one active reactor, producing about 10% of the electricity needs of Sweden. All reactors were built using BWR technology.

Unit 1 had an installed output of 494 MW and Unit 2 664 MW; these are now decommissioned. Unit 3, the newest reactor block at the facility, has an installed output of 1,450 MW.

Clab, the temporary storage facility for spent nuclear fuel from all Swedish reactors, is also located at the site.

== Operator ==
The responsible utility is OKG, short for the Oskarshamnsverkets Kraftgrupp AB, which was acquired by Sydkraft in 1993, (later: E.ON Sverige). Uniper owns 54.5% and the other partner Fortum 45.5% of OKG.

== History ==
On 23 September 2003, Unit 3 of the reactor was shut down due to mechanical problems, and together with a failure that occurred in a high voltage substation, this caused a power outage affecting five million people in southern Sweden and east Denmark.

On July 25, 2006, Units 1 and 2 were shut down as a precaution after a safety-related incident at a similar reactor at the Forsmark plant. The incident related to a failure of diesel generators to automatically start up when required, after a blackout caused by a shortcut at the grindgear sections at the plant. Modifications were later made to all the plants to address the issue.

On May 21, 2008, a welder tested positive for trace elements of explosives on a carrier bag and his hand at the entrance security check. The same evening Reactor 1 of the facility was shut down to allow bomb teams to sweep the facility. With police investigations ongoing, Kalmar police spokesperson Sven-Erik Karlsson confirmed to the TT news agency that a welder on his way in to the plant on Wednesday morning was caught with a relatively small amount of a highly explosive substance. The substance was later shown to be from nail polish and the event had no relevance to the operation of the plant or nuclear safety.

During 2010 Unit 2 underwent power and security upgrades. Unit 3 was after many upgrades the most powerful BWR in the world at approximately 1450 MW_{e}. Due to the upgrade, the reactor had been on and off the grid with prolonged maintenance outages throughout 2010. Unit 2 was upgraded in several steps and was planned to a reach maximum capacity of thermal power 2,300 MW and 840 MW_{e}, but was closed before all upgrades had been performed.

On September 30, 2013, a portion of the plant (the third reactor) was closed when a group of jellyfish clogged the cooling water intake pipes. It was not indicated as to whether the event had been classified as a safety disturbance yet, and to what level on the scale used for nuclear plants.

A decision on premature shutdown of units 1 and 2 was made in 2015. The decision entailed that there would be no future investments at unit 2 and the reactor would not be restarted.

Unit 1 was originally set for decommissioning on June 29, 2017, but it was closed prematurely due to an "operational disturbance" on June 17, 2017. It was decided not to restart the unit ahead of the shutdown scheduled for June 29, 2017.

In December 2018 a strategy was outlined for the "radiological demolition" of units 1 and 2 to be carried out between 2020 and 2028. This will allow the land to be used for other nuclear power related purposes.

The site has its own hydrogen production as the coolant for the electrical generators for all 3 reactors, capable of making 12 kg per day. With the closure of reactor 1 and 2, surplus capacity is available, and an agreement to supply so-called pink hydrogen to gas company Linde was made in January 2022.

Between April and August 2025, the plant is shut down while a leak in the primary cooling system is being repaired.

== See also ==
- Nuclear power in Sweden
- List of power stations in Sweden
- Template:Sweden nuke plant map
