= Sigyn =

Mythical wife of Loki

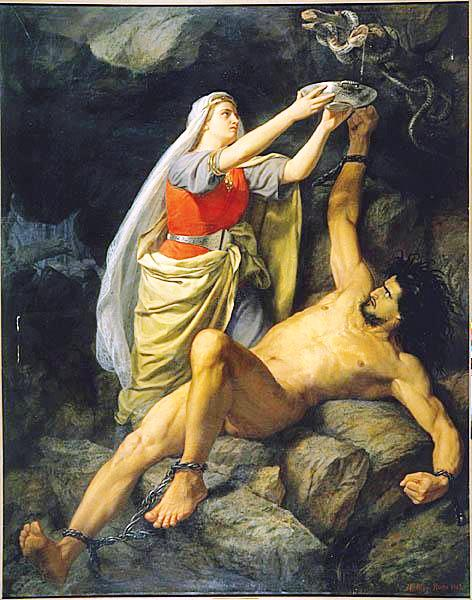
"Loki and Sigyn" (1863) by Mårten Eskil Winge.

Sigyn (Old Norse "(woman) friend of victory") is a deity from Norse mythology. She is attested in the Poetic Edda, compiled in the 13th century from earlier traditional sources, and the Prose Edda, written in the 13th century by Snorri Sturluson. In the Poetic Edda, little information is provided about Sigyn other than her role in assisting her husband Loki during his captivity. In the Prose Edda, her role in helping Loki through his time spent in bondage is reiterated, she appears in various kennings, and her status as a goddess is mentioned twice. Sigyn may appear on the Gosforth Cross and has been the subject of an amount of theory and cultural references.

== Attestations ==
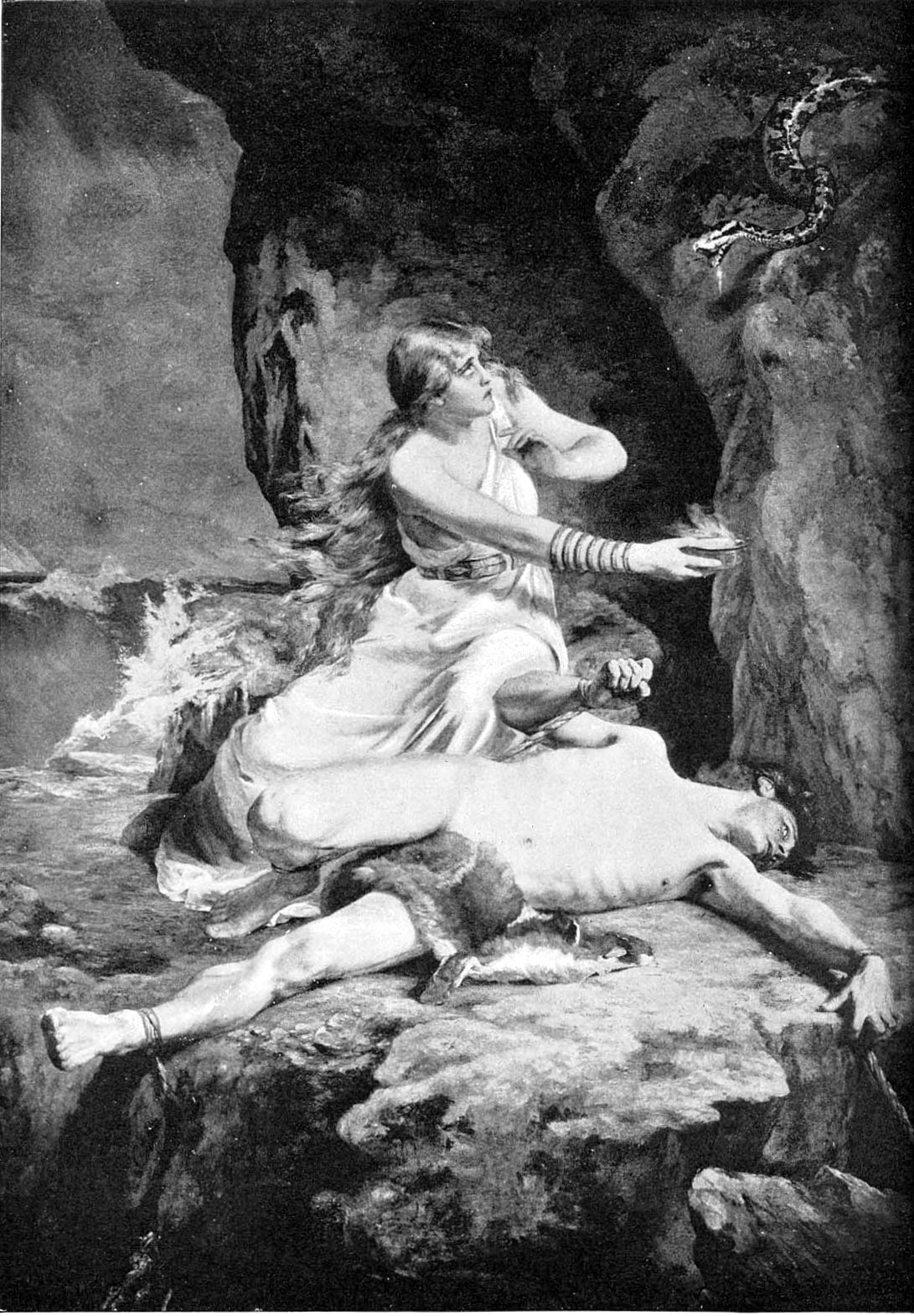
"Loki and Sigyn" (1892) by Karl Franz Eduard von Gebhardt.

Sigyn is attested in the following works:

=== Poetic Edda ===
In stanza 35 of the Poetic Edda poem Völuspá, a völva tells Odin that, amongst many other things, she sees Sigyn sitting very unhappily with her bound husband, Loki, under a "grove of hot springs". Sigyn is mentioned a second (and final) time in the ending prose section of the poem Lokasenna. In the prose, Loki has been bound by the gods with the guts of his son Nari, his son Váli is described as having been turned into a wolf, and the goddess Skaði fastens a venomous snake over Loki's face, from which venom drips. Sigyn holds a basin under the dripping venom. The basin grows full, and she pulls it away, during which time venom drops on Loki, causing him to writhe so violently that earthquakes occur that shake the entire earth.

=== Prose Edda ===
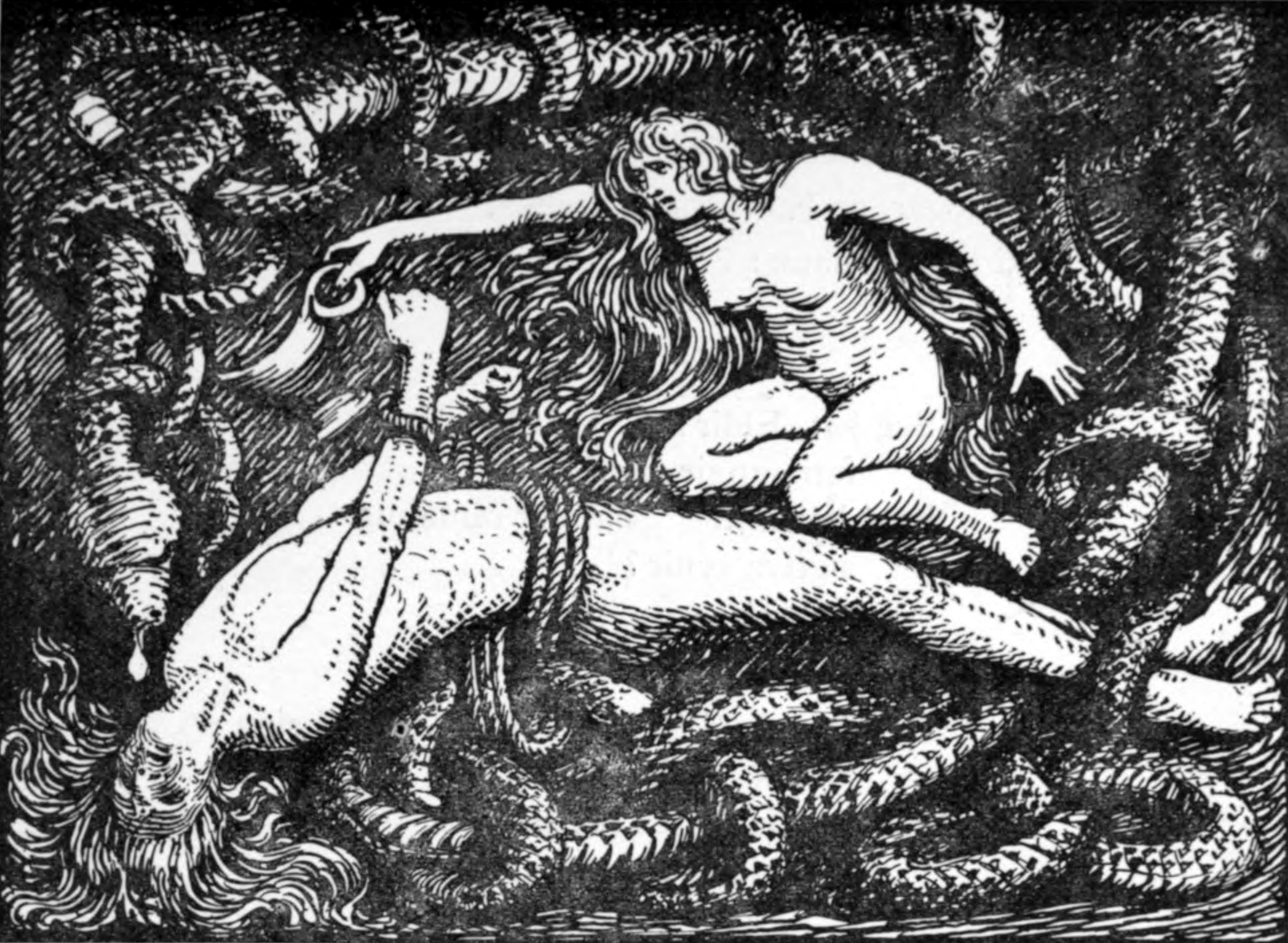
"Loki Bound (motive from the Gosforth Cross)" (1908) by W. G. Collingwood.

Sigyn appears in the books Gylfaginning and Skáldskaparmál in the Prose Edda. In Gylfaginning, Sigyn is introduced in chapter 31. There, she is introduced as being married to Loki, and that they have a son by the name of "Nari or Narfi". Sigyn is mentioned again in Gylfaginning in chapter 50, where events are described differently than in Lokasenna. Here, the gods have captured Loki and his two sons, who are stated as Váli, described as a son of Loki only, and "Nari or Narfi", earlier described a son of Sigyn and Loki. Váli is changed into a wolf by the gods, and rips apart his brother "Nari or Narfi". The guts of "Nari or Narfi" are then used to tie Loki to three stones, after which the guts turn to iron, and Skaði places a snake above Loki. Sigyn places herself beside him, where she holds out a bowl to catch the dripping venom. However, when the bowl becomes full she leaves to pour out the venom. As a result, Loki is again described as shaking so violently that the planet shakes, and this process repeats until he breaks free, setting Ragnarök into motion.

Sigyn is introduced as a goddess, an ásynja, in the Prose Edda book Skáldskaparmál, where the gods are holding a grand feast for the visiting Ægir, and in kennings for Loki: "husband of Sigyn", "cargo [Loki] of incantation-fetter's [Sigyn's] arms", and in a passage quoted from the 9th-century Haustlöng, "the burden of Sigyn's arms". The final mention of Sigyn in Skáldskaparmál is in the list of ásynjur in the appended Nafnaþulur section, chapter 75.

== Archaeological record ==
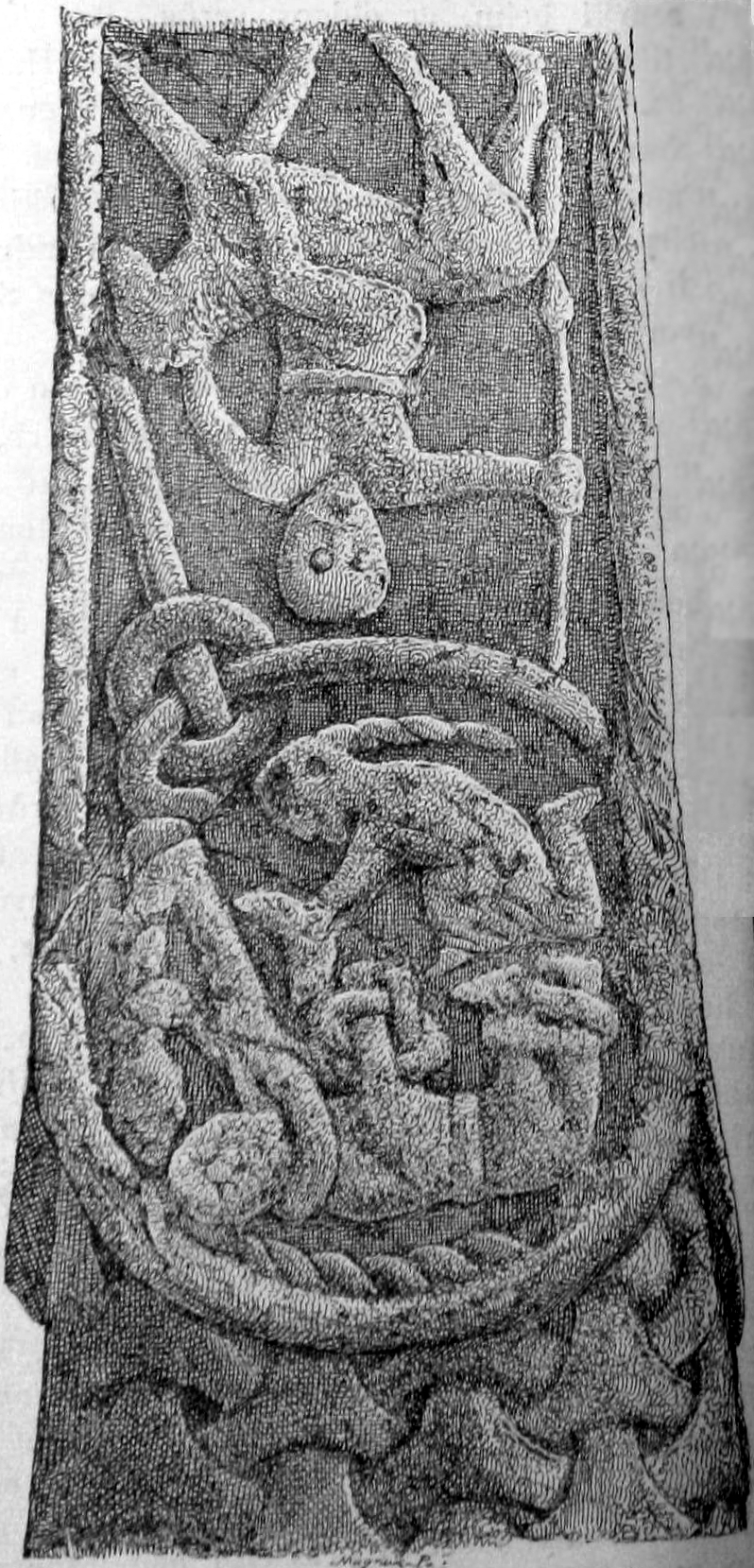
The bottom portion of the west side of the Gosforth Cross.

The mid-11th century Gosforth Cross located in Cumbria, England, has been interpreted as featuring various figures from Norse mythology. The bottom portion of the west side of the cross features a depiction of a long-haired female, kneeling figure holding an object above another prostrate, bound figure. Above and to their left is a knotted serpent. This has been interpreted as Sigyn soothing the bound Loki.

== Scholastic reception ==
While the name Sigyn is found as a female personal name in Old Norse sources (Old Norse sigr meaning 'victory' and vina meaning 'female friend'), and though in surviving sources she is largely restricted to a single role, she appears in the 9th century skaldic poem Haustlöng from pagan times, written by the skald Þjóðólfr of Hvinir. Due to this early connection with Loki, Sigyn has been theorized as a god dating back to an older form of Germanic paganism.

== Modern influence ==
The scene of Sigyn & Loki has been depicted on a number of paintings, including "Loke och Sigyn" (1850) by Nils Blommér, "Loke och Sigyn" (1863) by Mårten Eskil Winge, "Loki och Sigyn (1879) by Oscar Wergeland, and the illustration "Loki und Sigyn; Hel mit dem Hunde Garm" (1883) by K. Ehrenberg. Various objects and places have been named after Sigyn in modern times, including the Norwegian stiff-straw winter wheat varieties Sigyn I and Sigyn II, a Marvel Comics character (1978) of the same name, the Swedish vessel MS Sigyn, which transports spent nuclear fuel in an allusion to Sigyn holding a bowl beneath the venom to spare Loki, and the antarctic Sigyn Glacier.
