= Kangos =

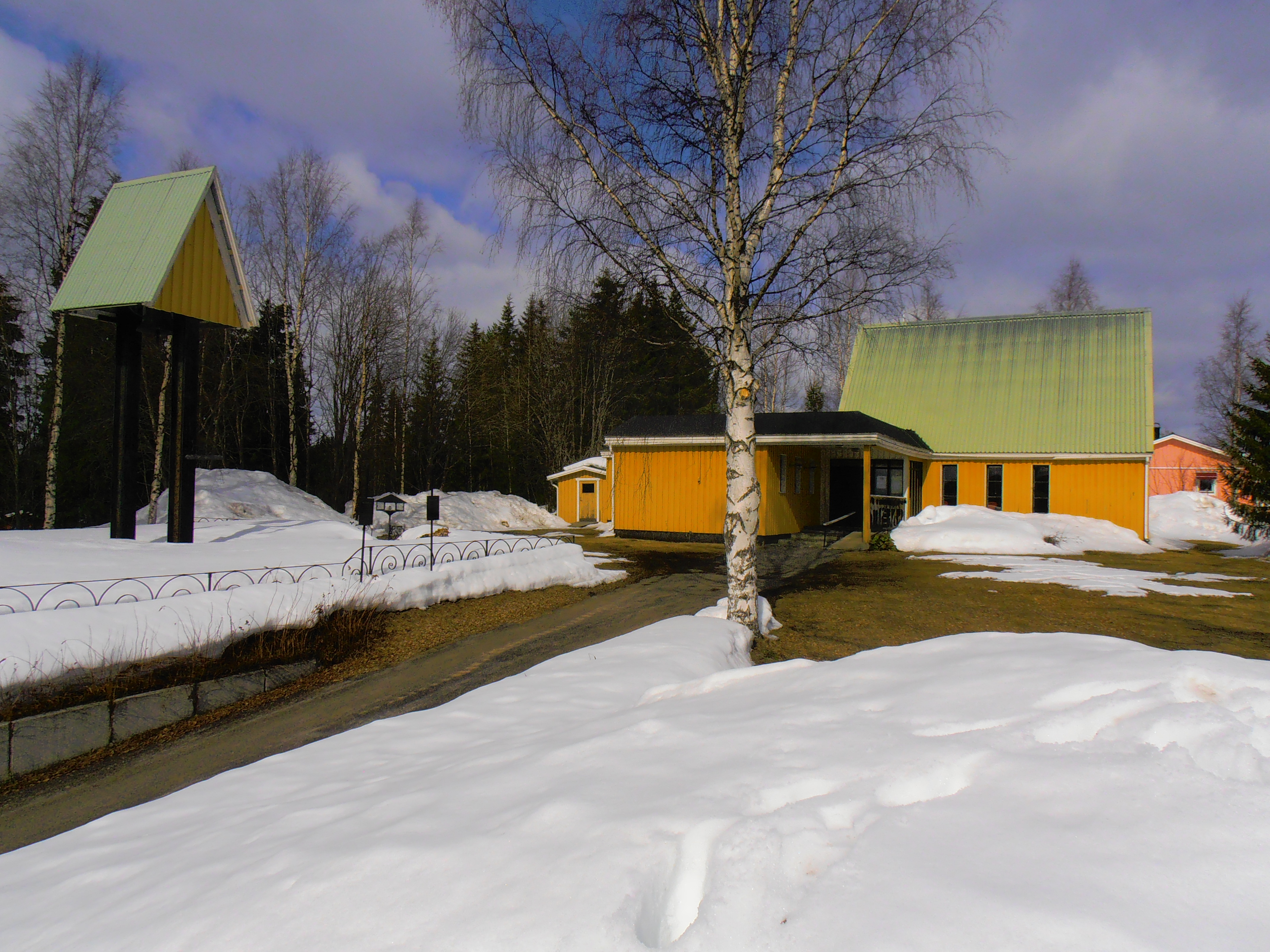

- Location within Norrbotten Location within Sweden
- Coordinates: 67°29′N 22°40′E
- Country: Sweden
- Province: Norrbotten
- County: Norrbotten County
- Municipality: Pajala Municipality

Area
  - Total: 1.47 km^{2} (0.57 sq mi)

Population (31 December 2010)
  - Total: 252
  - Density: 172/km^{2} (450/sq mi)
- Time zone: UTC+1 (CET)
  - Summer (DST): UTC+2 (CEST)

Kangos (Meänkieli: Kangonen) is a locality situated in Pajala Municipality, Norrbotten County, Sweden with 252 inhabitants in 2010.
