= Havsnäs Wind Farm =

Wind farm in Sweden

- Country: Sweden
- Location: Strömsund, Jämtland
- Coordinates: 64°04′20″N 15°43′20″E
- Status: Operational
- Construction began: 2008
- Commission date: 2010
- Owners: HgCapital (75%); Nordisk Vindkraft (25%)

Wind farm
- Rotor diameter: 90 m (300 ft)

Power generation
- Units operational: 3 × 1.8 MW; 44 × 2 MW
- Make and model: Vestas V90-2MW (44); Vestas V90-1.8MW (3)
- Nameplate capacity: 95.4 MW

The Havsnäs Wind Farm is the largest onshore wind farm in Sweden. The wind farm consists of 48 Vestas V90 wind turbines. The 95.4 megawatt wind farm was officially opened on 2 September 2010. It is owned by Fu-Gen AG (75%) .
