= Aapua =

Village in Sweden

Coordinates: 66°51′N 23°32′E

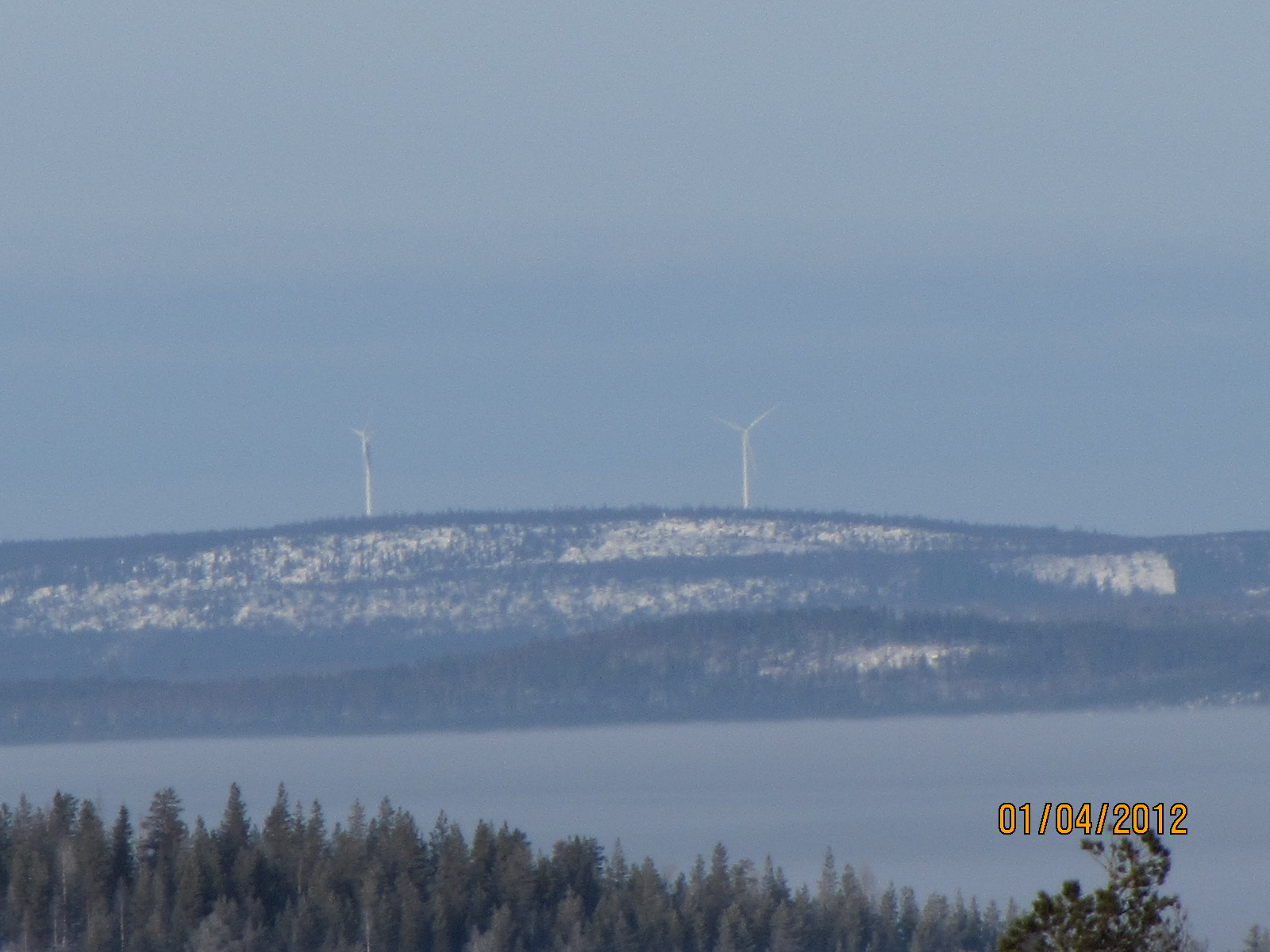
Wind turbines of Aapua

Aapua is a village in the county of Norrbotten in Sweden. The village is situated in Övertorneå Municipality, 60 km from Pajala. In 2000 the village had 137 inhabitants. To the south there is a lake, Aapuajärvi. In 2005, seven wind turbines were built on the mountain Etu-Aapua, which is nearby. These wind turbines are the northernmost wind turbines in Sweden.
