= Sydkraft =

Swedish power company

Sydkraft Energie AB
- Formerly: Sydsvenska Kraftaktiebolaget
- Company type: Subsidiary
- Industry: Electricity
- Headquarters: Malmö, Sweden
- Key people: Johan Svenningsson (CEO)
- Products: Electric power
- Parent: Uniper
- Subsidiaries: Sydkraft Nuclear Power AB; Sydkraft Hydro Power AB; Sydkraft Thermal Power AB; Barsebäck Kraft AB; OKG AB

Sydkraft AB is a power company headquartered in Malmö, Sweden. It is a subsidiary of the international energy group Uniper for operations in Sweden. The company is engaged in the generation of thermal, nuclear, and hydro power. The history of Sydkraft reaches back to 1906; however, the current company was created as a result of the split of Uniper from another international energy group E.ON.

== History ==
Sydkraft was founded in 1906 as Sydsvenska Kraftaktiebolaget with August Schmitz as CEO. Originally, the company was producer of hydroelectricity. In 1915, in cooperation with the Swedish and Danish electricity grids, Sydsvenska Kraftaktiebolaget participated in the construction of Öresundskabeln, the first electricity interconnection between Sweden and Denmark.

In the 1970s, the company moved into production of nuclear power. In 1971, the Oskarshamn Nuclear Power Plant was commissioned, with Sydsvenska Kraftaktiebolaget as major shareholder. In 1977, the company changed its changed name to Sydkraft.

The majority shareholding in Sydkraft AB was acquired in 2001 by E.ON in a deal valued at US$6.5 billion. In 2004, Sydkraft bought the Swedish energy company Graninge. On 16 September 2005, Sydkraft AB changed its corporate name to E.ON Sverige. In 2006, E.ON Sverige sold its broadband network to Tele2.

On 24 July 2008, Statkraft AS and E.ON AG signed a final agreement on asset swap, according to which E.ON acquired Statkraft's 44.6% of shares in E.ON Sverige by exchange of assets worth of €4.5 billion. After split of Uniper from E.ON, E.ON Sverige's thermal, nuclear and hydro power generation was given to Uniper while renewable energy (except hydro), services, distribution, and retail sale remained in E.ON Sverige. Uniper readopted the name Sydkraft for its operations in Sweden.

== Operations ==
Sydkraft AB is involved in the generation of thermal, nuclear and hydro power through its subsidiaries. Its wholly owned subsidiaries are Sydkraft Nuclear Power AB, Sydkraft Hydro Power AB, Sydkraft Thermal Power AB, and Barsebäck Kraft AB. It also owns majority stake in OKG AB.

== See also ==
- Vattenfall
- Anders Björgerd
