= Junosuando =

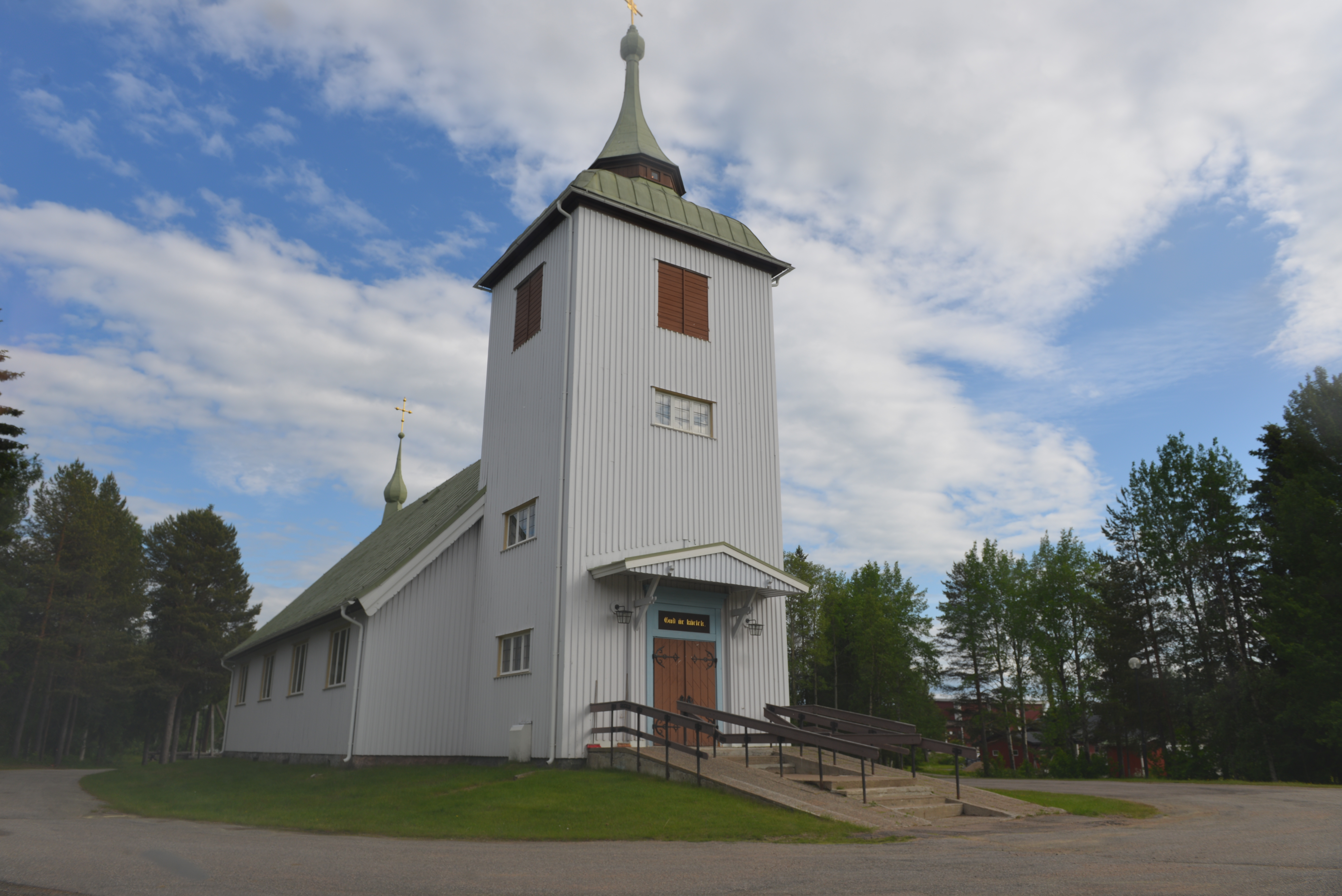

- Location within Norrbotten Location within Sweden
- Coordinates: 67°26′N 22°31′E
- Country: Sweden
- Province: Norrbotten
- County: Norrbotten County
- Municipality: Pajala Municipality

Area
  - Total: 1.27 km^{2} (0.49 sq mi)

Population (31 December 2010)
  - Total: 322
  - Density: 253/km^{2} (660/sq mi)
- Time zone: UTC+1 (CET)
  - Summer (DST): UTC+2 (CEST)

Junosuando (Swedish pronunciation: [jɵnɔsʉˈǎnːdɔ]; Meänkieli: Junosuanto) is a locality situated in Pajala Municipality, Norrbotten County, Sweden with 322 inhabitants in 2010. It was founded in 1637.
