= Pajala Municipality =

Pajala Municipality Pajala kommun
- Municipality
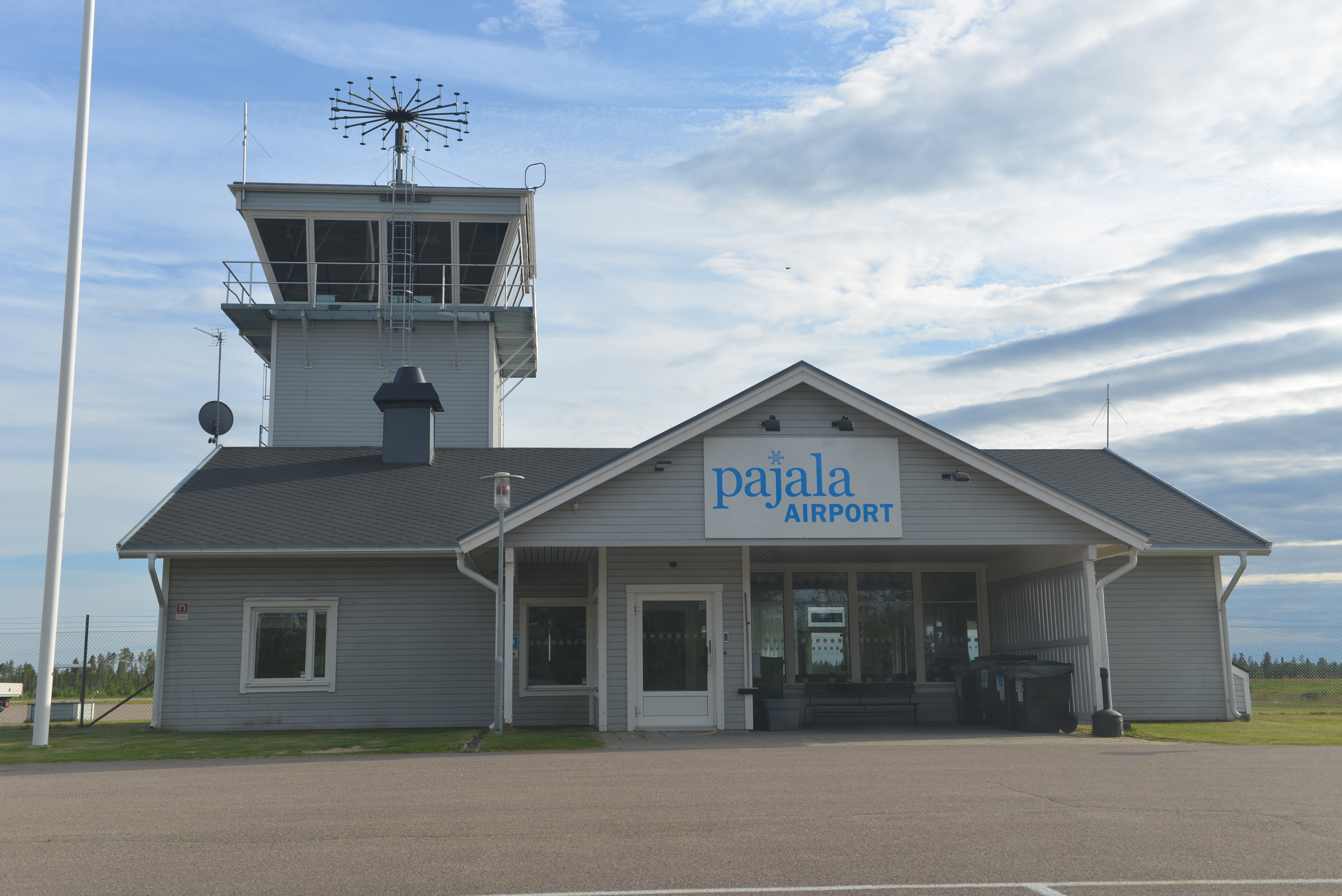
- Pajala Airport

- Flag Coat of arms

- Coordinates: 67°11′N 23°22′E
- Country: Sweden
- County: Norrbotten County
- Seat: Pajala

Area
  - Total: 8,050.73 km^{2} (3,108.40 sq mi)
  - Land: 7,840.19 km^{2} (3,027.11 sq mi)
  - Water: 210.54 km^{2} (81.29 sq mi)
- Area as of 1 January 2014.

Population (30 June 2025)
  - Total: 5,780
  - Density: 0.737/km^{2} (1.91/sq mi)
- Time zone: UTC+1 (CET)
  - Summer (DST): UTC+2 (CEST)
- ISO 3166 code: SE
- Province: Norrbotten
- Municipal code: 2521
- Website: www.pajala.se

Pajala Municipality (Swedish: Pajala kommun; Meänkieli and Finnish: Pajalan kunta) is a municipality in Norrbotten County in northern Sweden, bordering Finland. Its seat is located in the locality of Pajala.

In 1884 Tärendö was detached from Pajala Municipality, forming a municipality of its own. In 1914 Pajala Municipality was once again split when Junosuando broke away. They were reunited in 1971, when Korpilombolo was added as well.

Finnish and Meänkieli have the official status of being minority languages in the municipality.

== History ==
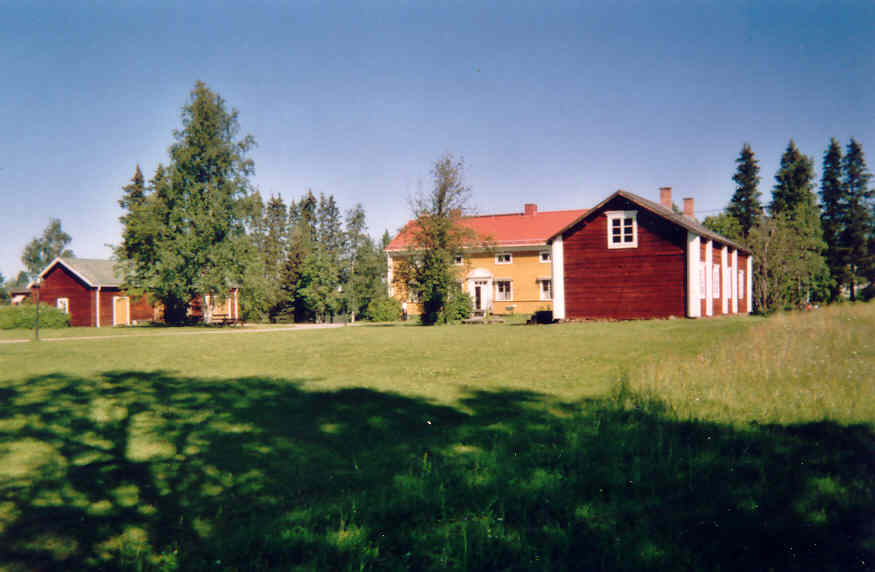
Pajala vicar's mansion, (Læstadiuspörtet)

Its geographical location infers that Pajala Municipality has always been a natural trading place, where people from Sweden, Finland and the native Sami people gathered. The annual Pajala market traces its history from the 18th century.

The home of Lars Levi Læstadius, famed botanist and Christian revivalist movement founder is located in Pajala. It is the red house to the right; it is now a museum. The yellow house in the middle was used as the local Lutheran vicar's mansion from 1850 up to present day.

== Geography ==
The municipality is one of Sweden's largest, geographically, at around 8,000 km^{2}, or roughly the size of the historical province of Södermanland, which - compared to Pajala Municipality's population of approximately 6,500 - has more than one million inhabitants.

In Pajala is also Jupukkamasten, a 335-metre-tall (1,099 ft) guyed mast for FM and TV transmission, which together with three other guyed masts of the same height is the tallest structure in Sweden.

=== Localities ===
There are four localities (or urban areas) in Pajala Municipality:

#	Locality	Population
1	**Pajala**	1,985
2	Korpilombolo	548
3	Junosuando	345
4	Kangos	278

The municipal seat in bold

== Demographics ==
This is a demographic table based on Pajala Municipality's electoral districts in the 2022 Swedish general election sourced from SVT's election platform, in turn taken from SCB official statistics.

In total there were 4,657 Swedish citizens of voting age resident in the municipality. 56.0% voted for the left coalition and 42.7% for the right coalition. Indicators are in percentage points except population totals and income.

Location	Residents	Citizen adults	Left vote	Right vote	Employed	Swedish parents	Foreign heritage	Income SEK	Degree
Location			%	%					
Junosuando	954	818	50.4	47.7	79	88	12	21,675	21
Korpilombolo	1,187	854	48.2	50.6	83	87	13	22,130	21
Pajala N	1,308	1,018	62.3	36.5	84	83	17	23,715	27
Pajala S	1,502	1,122	60.3	38.4	82	77	23	22,906	29
Tärendö	1,015	845	61.6	37.9	85	90	10	22,792	27
Source: SVT

== Government and politics ==
=== Riksdag ===
These are the results since the 1972 municipal reform. Norrbotten Party participated in 1994 but the results were not published by SCB due to the party's small size at the time.

Year	Turnout	Votes	V	S	MP	C	L	KD	M	SD	ND	NP/SP
1973	88.4	6,065	24.2	44.6	0.0	17.6	3.2	2.3	7.7	0.0	0.0	0.0
1976	88.7	5,978	22.4	46.7	0.0	17.1	2.8	2.1	8.2	0.0	0.0	0.0
1979	89.0	5,877	19.6	45.9	0.0	14.0	3.2	2.5	9.4	0.0	0.0	0.0
1982	88.3	5,841	19.5	50.3	0.5	11.9	1.6	2.1	10.2	0.0	0.0	0.0
1985	87.4	5,791	19.6	53.0	0.4	11.6	4.9	0.0	10.4	0.0	0.0	0.0
1988	81.9	5,341	18.4	51.1	2.1	9.7	5.2	2.9	8.1	0.0	0.0	0.0
1991	81.8	5,192	18.6	50.1	1.3	8.4	4.4	4.8	8.1	0.0	2.8	0.0
1994	84.8	5,394	20.3	50.4	2.1	6.1	3.4	3.3	8.2	0.0	0.3	0.0
1998	80.6	4,861	30.1	42.4	2.1	4.4	1.6	7.6	9.4	0.0	0.0	0.0
2002	77.8	4,392	19.5	35.5	2.5	4.2	2.2	7.9	5.0	0.0	0.0	21.6
2006	77.1	4,049	22.8	45.9	2.1	4.8	2.3	5.6	10.0	1.4	0.0	4.2
2010	81.5	4,100	18.8	51.3	2.1	3.3	2.1	5.5	12.6	3.9	0.0	0.0
2014	80.9	4,024	17.9	46.2	2.3	3.3	1.6	5.3	9.5	11.4	0.0	0.0

Blocs

This lists the relative strength of the socialist and centre-right blocs since 1973, but parties not elected to the Riksdag are inserted as "other", including the Sweden Democrats results from 1988 to 2006, but also the Christian Democrats pre-1991 and the Greens in 1982, 1985 and 1991. The sources are identical to the table above. The coalition or government mandate marked in bold formed the government after the election. New Democracy got elected in 1991 but are still listed as "other" due to the short lifespan of the party. "Elected" is the total number of percentage points from the municipality that went to parties who were elected to the Riksdag.

Year	Turnout	Votes	Left	Right	SD	Other	Elected
1973	88.4	6,065	**68.8**	28.5	0.0	2.7	97.3
1976	88.7	5,978	69.1	**28.1**	0.0	2.8	97.2
1979	89.0	5,877	65.5	**26.6**	0.0	7.9	92.1
1982	88.3	5,841	**69.8**	23.7	0.0	6.5	93.5
1985	87.4	5,791	**72.6**	26.9	0.0	0.5	99.5
1988	81.9	5,341	**71.6**	23.0	0.0	5.4	94.6
1991	81.8	5,192	68.7	**25.7**	0.0	5.6	97.2
1994	84.8	5,394	**72.8**	21.0	0.0	6.2	93.8
1998	80.6	4,861	**74.6**	23.0	0.0	2.4	97.6
2002	77.8	4,392	**57.5**	19.3	0.0	23.2	76.8
2006	77.1	4,049	70.8	**22.7**	0.0	6.5	93.5
2010	81.5	4,100	72.2	**23.5**	3.9	0.4	99.6
2014	80.9	4,024	**66.4**	19.7	11.4	2.5	97.5

Distribution of the 33 seats in the municipal council after the 2010 election:

- Social Democratic Party 18
- Left Party 7
- Christian Democrats 3
- Moderate Party 2
- Norrbottens Sjukvårdsparti 2
- Centre Party 1

Results of the 2010 Swedish general election in Pajala:

- Social Democratic Party 51.3%
- Left Party 18.8%
- Moderate Party 12.6%
- Christian Democrats 5.5%
- Sweden Democrats 3.9%
- Centre Party 3.2%
- Liberal People's Party 2.1%
- Green Party 2.1%

== Sister cities ==
Pajala Municipality has three sister cities:

- Målselv, Norway
- Kolari, Finland
- Olenegorsk, Russia

== See also ==
- Keräntöjärvi
