= Swedish national road 99 =

Road in Sweden

National Road 99
- Riksväg 99
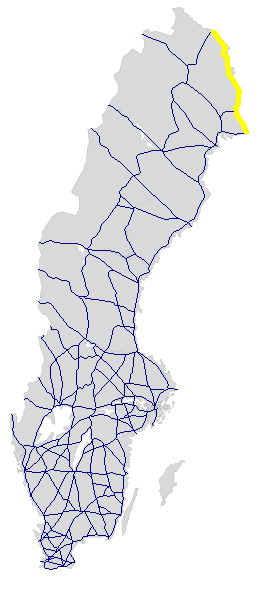

Location
- Country: Sweden

Highway system
- Roads in Sweden; National Roads; County Roads

Swedish national road 99 (Swedish: Riksväg 99), is a Swedish national road in Norrbotten County in northern Sweden between Haparanda and Karesuando. The length of the road is 360 km.

The road is an ordinary road with one lane in each direction without any middle barrier all its length, except for one kilometer (around a half mile) in Haparanda where it is divided with two lanes per direction.

All of its length, the road follows more or less close to the Finland–Sweden border which almost totally goes in the Torne and Muonio rivers. Around Pajala it diverges around 15 km (10 miles) from the border river, otherwise the road mostly goes within 1 km from the border.

The area is relatively sparsely populated, but the road goes through several villages, especially in the Southern half: Haparanda, Vojakkala, Karungi, Hedenäset, Övertorneå, Juoksengi, Svanstein, Pello, Kengis, Pajala, Muodoslompolo and Karesuando. At Juoksengi the road crosses the Arctic Circle.

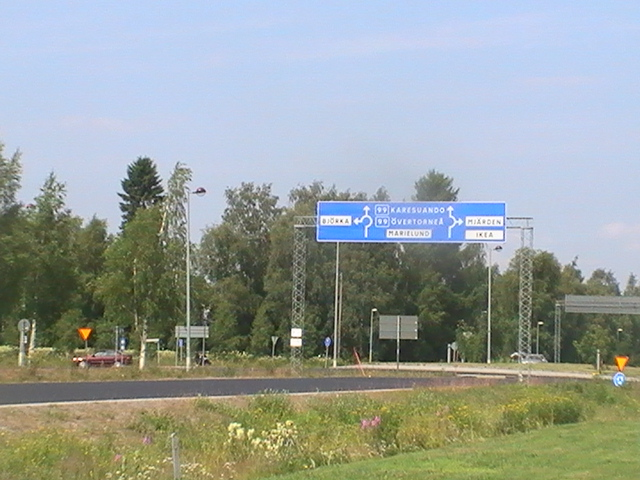
Swedish national road 99 at Haparanda
