= Swedish national road =

Class of road in Sweden

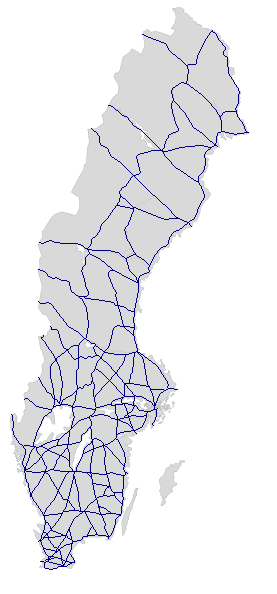
Sweden's network of national roads in 2008, European routes here included

Number sign for national roads

National roads (Swedish: riksväg; literally: road of the rike/realm) in Sweden have road numbers from 1 through 99. The national roads are usually of high quality and sometimes pass through several counties. Roads with lower numbers are in southern Sweden, and roads with higher numbers are in northern Sweden. There are many cases where two or more routes in this system share the same physical road for a considerable distance, giving the country several kilometers of double-numbered road.

The network of national roads covers all of Sweden. In 2015, the total length of all national roads (excluding European routes) was 8,900 km (5,500 mi). The only county that does not have a riksväg is Gotland County. On Gotland and the adjacent island of Öland, the main roads are instead known as county road (länsväg). The national roads are public roads owned by the Government of Sweden and administered by the Swedish Transport Administration. They get a high priority for snow plowing during the winter.

The roads' number signs are rectangular with a blue background, white numbers, and a white border.

== Current Swedish national roads ==
As of 2017, Sweden has 57 national roads.

Number	Southern endpoint	Northern endpoint	Length (km)	Length (mi)
Riksväg 9	Trelleborg	Brösarp	140	87
Riksväg 11	Malmö	Simrishamn	88	55
Riksväg 13	Ystad	Ängelholm	131	81
Riksväg 15	Karlshamn	Halmstad	154	96
Riksväg 17	Landskrona	Fogdarp	35	22
Riksväg 19	Ystad	Broby	90	56
Riksväg 21	Åstorp	Kristianstad	100	62
Riksväg 23	(Malmö) Rolsberga	Linköping	375	233
Riksväg 24	Hässleholm	Mellbystrand	73	45
Riksväg 25	Halmstad	Kalmar	232	144
Riksväg 26	Halmstad	Mora	560	350
Riksväg 27	Karlskrona	Gothenburg	338	210
Riksväg 28	Karlskrona	Vägershult	93	58
Riksväg 29	Karlshamn	Tingsryd (Växjö)	35	22
Riksväg 30	Växjö	Jönköping	198	123
Riksväg 31	Nybro	Jönköping	174	108
Riksväg 32	Ekenässjön	Mjölby	124	77
Riksväg 34	Ålem	Motala	231	144
Riksväg 35	Gamleby	Linköping	75	47
Riksväg 37	Växjö	Oskarshamn	127	79
Riksväg 40	Gothenburg	Västervik	311	193
Riksväg 41	Varberg	Borås	83	52
Riksväg 42	Borås	Trollhättan	86	53
Riksväg 44	Uddevalla	Götene	110	68
Riksväg 46	Ulricehamn	Skövde	64	40
Riksväg 47	Oskarshamn	Grästorp (Trollhättan)	310	190
Riksväg 49	Lidköping	Askersund	114	71
Riksväg 50	(Jönköping) Mjölby	Söderhamn	468	291
Riksväg 51	Norrköping	Örebro	110	68
Riksväg 52	Nyköping	Kumla (Örebro)	130	81
Riksväg 53	Oxelösund	Eskilstuna	100	62
Riksväg 55	Norrköping	Uppsala	201	125
Riksväg 56	Norrköping	Gävle	290	180
Riksväg 57	Katrineholm	Järna	60	37
Riksväg 61	Karlstad	Norwegian border (Eda)	109	68
Riksväg 62	Karlstad	Norwegian border (Långflon)	222	138
Riksväg 63	Karlstad	Kopparberg	127	79
Riksväg 66	Västerås	Norwegian border (Stöa)	340	210
Riksväg 68	Örebro	Gävle	230	140
Riksväg 69	Fagersta	Rättvik	138	86
Riksväg 70	Enköping	Norwegian border (Flötningen)	419	260
Riksväg 72	Sala	Uppsala	63	39
Riksväg 73	Nynäshamn	Stockholm	51	32
Riksväg 75	Stockholm	Nacka	9	5.6
Riksväg 76	Norrtälje	Gävle	156	97
Riksväg 77	Knivsta	Rösa (Norrtälje)	45	28
Riksväg 83	Tönnebro	Ånge	216	134
Riksväg 84	Hudiksvall	Norwegian border (Fjällnäs)	320	200
Riksväg 86	Sundsvall	Bispgården	78	48
Riksväg 87	Sollefteå	Östersund	151	94
Riksväg 90	Utansjö/Mörtsal	Meselefors	229	142
Riksväg 92	Umeå	Dorotea	178	111
Riksväg 94	(Luleå) Antnäs	Arvidsjaur	135	84
Riksväg 95	Skellefteå	Norwegian border (Merkenisvuopmekietje)	350	220
Riksväg 97	Luleå	Jokkmokk	168	104
Riksväg 98	Överkalix	Övertorneå	50	31
Riksväg 99	Haparanda	Karesuando	361	224

== Swedish national roads that have changed designation over the years ==
- 10, Trelleborg – Brösarp — renumbered to National road 9 in 1992 to avoid confusion with E10
- 11, Malmö – Skurup – Ystad — became E14 (now E65) in the late 1970s; reassigned to a different route
- 12, Malmö – Simrishamn — renumbered to National road 11 in 1992 to avoid confusion with E12
- 14, Ystad – Osby — renumbered to national road 20 around 1970 to avoid confusion with E14 (now E65); current National road 19
- 15, Malmö – Norrköping — became E66 (now E22); reassigned to a different route
- 16, Dalby – Flädie – downgraded to County road 102 and E6.02 (not signposted) to avoid confusion with E16
- 19, Eslöv – Klippan — became a portion of National road 13 in 1985
- 20, Ystad – Broby — renumbered to National road 19 in 1992 to avoid confusion with E20
- 22, Helsingborg – Höganäs — downgraded to County road 111 in 1985
- 23, Växjö – Oskarshamn — became a portion of National road 37 in 2007
- 33, Jönköping – Västervik — became a portion of National road 40 in 2009
- 36, Linköping – Motala — became a portion of National road 34 in 2007
- 45, Gothenburg – Karesuando — upgraded to E45 in 2006
- 48, Slättäng – Mariestad — became a portion of National road 26 in 2003
- 58, Nyköping–Flen...Västerås – Eskilstuna — became portions of National road 52, County road 221 and National road 53 (now National road 56) in 1985
- 60, Örebro – Falun — became a portion of National road 50 in 2001
- 64, Hassle – Mora — became a portion of National road 26 in 2003
- 65, Västerås – Ludvika — renumbered to National road 66 in 1992 to avoid confusion with E65
- 67, Västerås – Sala – Gävle — became a portion of National road 56 in 2007
- 71, Borlänge – Norwegian border (Stöa) — became portions of E16 and National road 66 in 2012
- 74, Stockholm – Ålstäket — downgraded to County road 222 in 1985
- 78, Uppsala – Östhammar — downgraded to County road 288 in 1985
- 79, Uppsala – Östhammar — renumbered to National road 78 in the 1960s to avoid confusion with E79; current County road 288
- 80, Rättvik – Falun – Gävle — became portions of E16 and National road 69 in 2012
- 81, Mora – Östersund — became a portion of National road 45 in 1991; current E45
- 82, Söderhamn – Voxna — downgraded to County road 301 in 1985; Alfta – Bollnäs – Söderhamn was upgraded to National road 50 in 2001
- 88, Östersund – Karesuando — became a portion of National road 45 in 1991; current E45
- 91, Örnsköldsvik – Åsele — downgraded to County road 348 in 1986
- 93, Umeå – Storuman — upgraded to E79 (now E12)
- 94, Skellefteå – Malå — downgraded to County road 370 in 1986; reassigned to a different route
- 96, Piteå – Älvsbyn — downgraded to County road 374 in 1986
- 98, Luleå – Kiruna — upgraded to E10 in 1992; reassigned to a different route
- 99, Sangis – Hedenäset — downgraded to County road 398 in 1986; reassigned to a different route

== The classic Swedish national roads ==
These are the Swedish national roads that existed before the large restructuring that happened when the European routes were implemented in 1962 in Sweden.

- Road 1, Riksettan, Helsingborg – Stockholm — current European route E4
- Road 2, Rikstvåan, Trelleborg – Svinesund bridge — current European route E6
- Road 3, Rikstrean, Connection road between riksettan and rikstvåan outside Helsingborg, Kropp – Hasslarp – Strövelstorp
- Road 4, Riksfyran, Malmö – Norrköping — current European route E22
- Road 5, Riksfemman, Gothenburg – Jönköping — current National road 40
- Road 6, Rikssexan, Gothenburg – Örebro – Södertälje – Stockholm — current European route E20
- Road 7, Rikssjuan, Gothenburg – Grums — current European route E45
- Road 8, Riksåttan, Ödeshög – Hallsberg — current National road 50
- Road 9, Riksnian, Norwegian border – Karlskoga — current European route E18
- Road 10, Rikstian, Örebro – Gävle — current National road 50 and European route E16
- Road 11, Rikselvan, Arboga – Enköping — current European route E18
- Road 12, Rikstolvan, Solna – Mora — current E18 and National road 70
- Road 13, Rikstretton, Stockholm – Haparanda — current European route E4
- Road 14, Riksfjorton, Sundsvall – Norwegian border — current European route E14

== See also ==
- Swedish county road (Länsväg)
- Norwegian national road
