= Swedish national road 13 =

Road in Sweden

National Road 13
- Riksväg 13
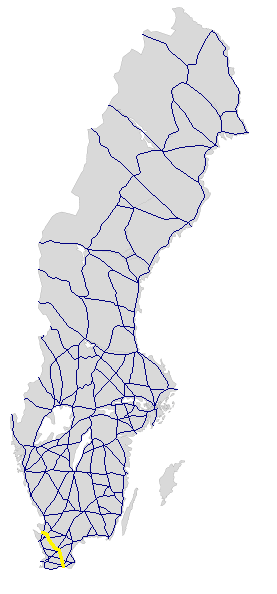

Location
- Country: Sweden

Highway system
- Roads in Sweden; National Roads; County Roads

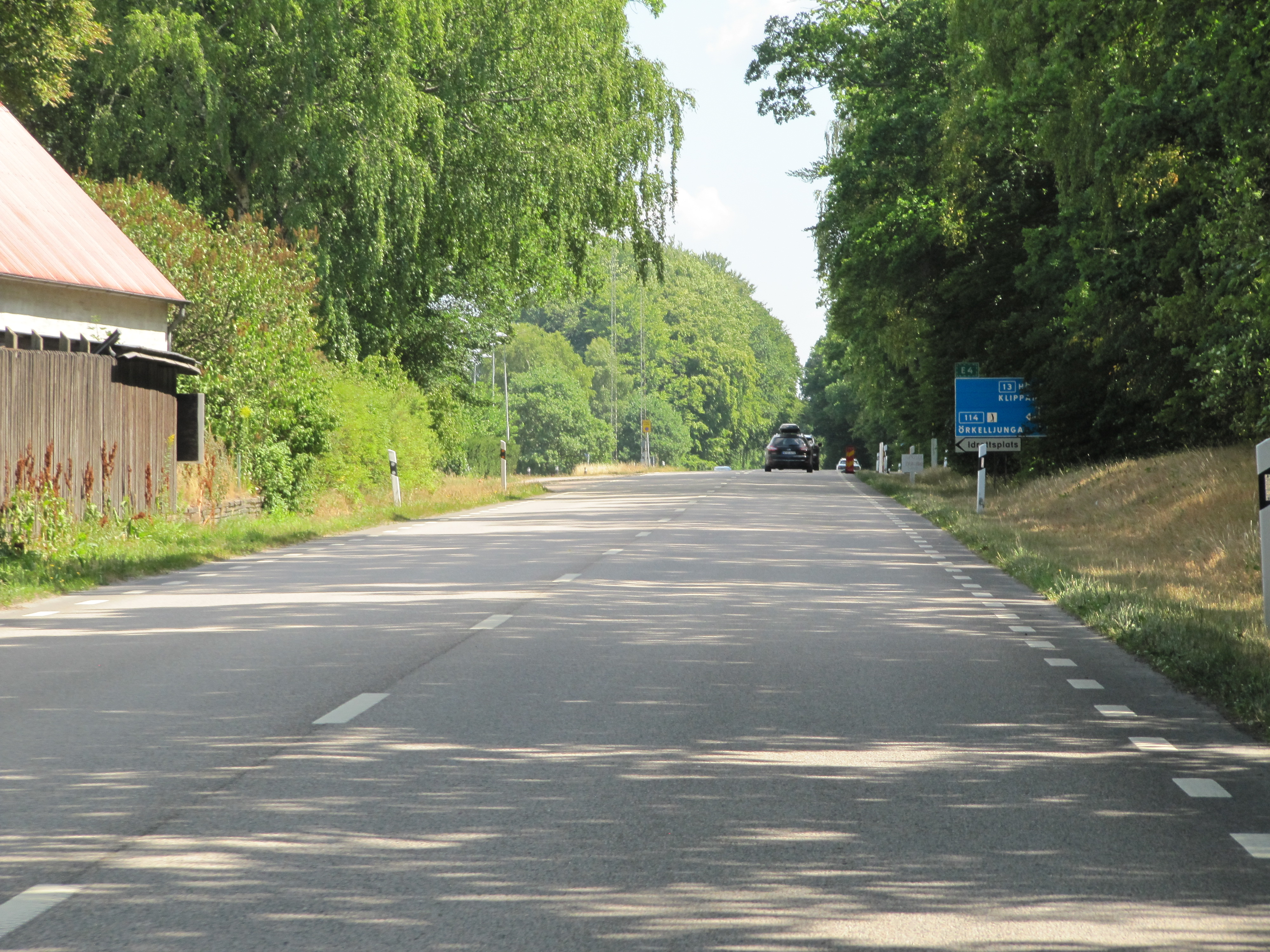
National road 13 in Munka-Ljungby.

Swedish national road 13 (Swedish: Riksväg 13), is a Swedish national road in Skåne in southern Sweden between Ystad and Ängelholm, through Höör and Klippan. The length of the road is 131 km (81 mi).

The road begins at the Ystad ferry terminal, branching off from National Road 9 and European Route 65. National Road 13 then heads north, intersecting National Road 11 at Sjöbo and European Route 22 at Hörby.
