= Riksväg 1 =

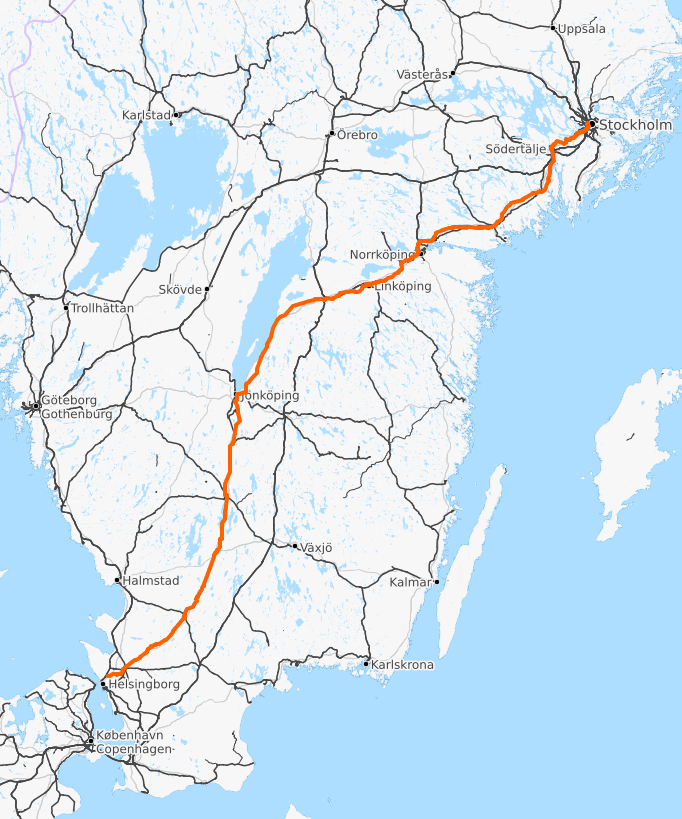
Riksväg 1's stretching between Helsingborg and Stockholm.

Riksväg 1 was 1945 to 1962 the trunk road between Helsingborg and Stockholm. Its importance as a trunk road have nowadays been replaced by the international E-road network E4 which partly runs in parallel with Riksväg 1. In 1960 the complete distance of Riksväg 1 was 588 kilometers, while the corresponding distance of the E4 today is 561 kilometers.

The older parts of the road between Markaryd and Vaggeryd is nowadays advertised as the scenic and tourist route Riksettan.

The northernmost parts between Södertälje and Stockholm was also called Södertäljevägen. Through Salem Municipality and past the lake Bornsjön it is now called Bergaholmsvägen. An older stretch south of Stockholm was Göta highway, which still partly exist.

== See also ==
- Tourist route Riksettan
- Göta highway
- Grännavägen
- Södertäljevägen
