= Swedish national road 52 =

Road in Sweden

National Road 52
- Riksväg 52
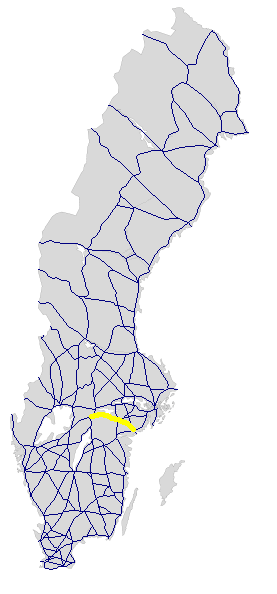

Location
- Country: Sweden

Highway system
- Roads in Sweden; National Roads; County Roads

National Road 52 (Swedish: Riksväg 52) is a Swedish national road in eastern Sweden between Nyköping and Kumla, through Katrineholm. The length of the road is approximately 130 km (88.7 mi).

The road is a rural highway with two lanes along the entire route.
