= Inlandsvägen =

Road in Sweden

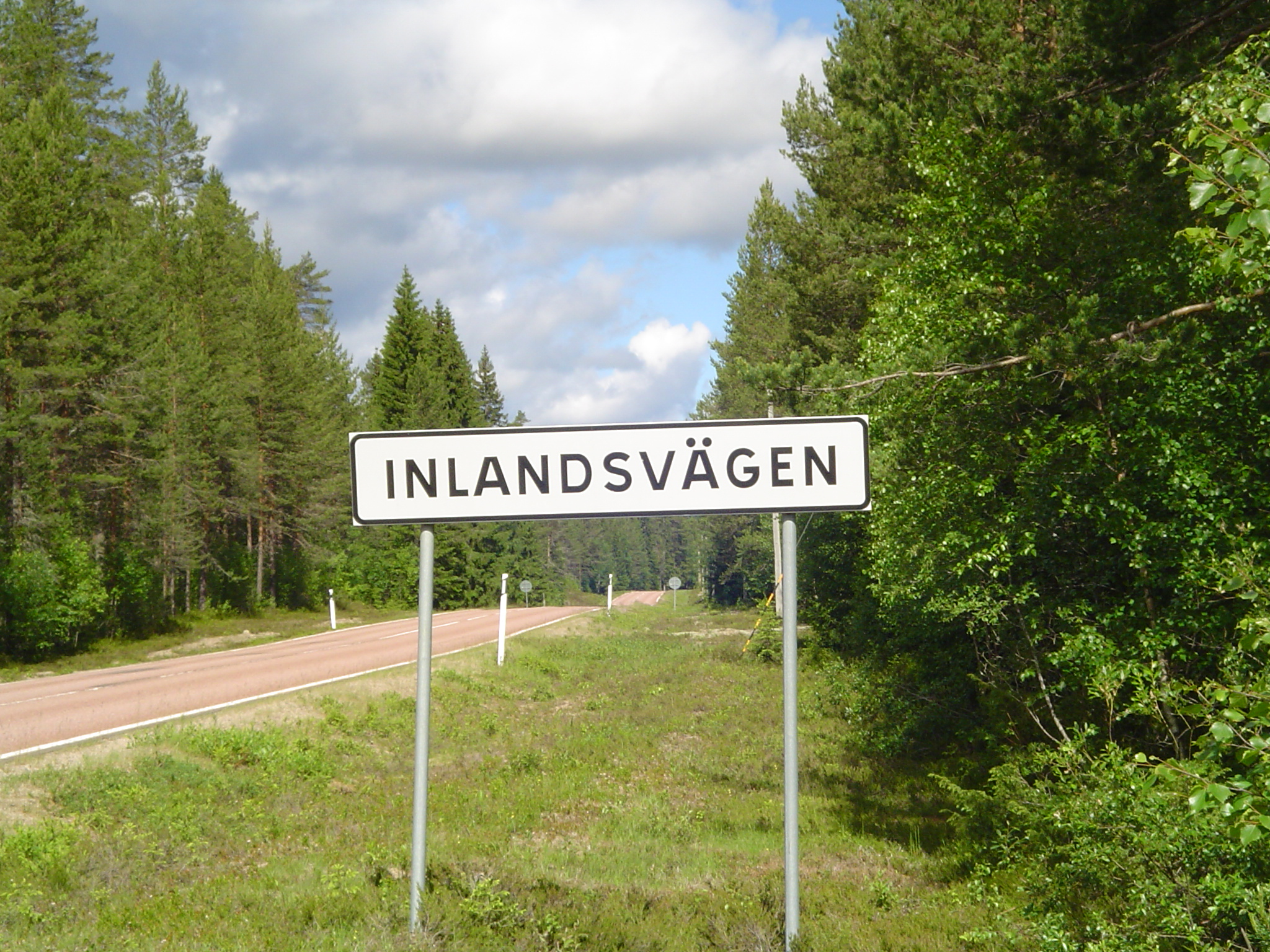
Road sign along the Inlandsvägen

Inlandsvägen (The Inland Road) is a road passing through the center of Sweden from Gothenburg in the south to Karesuando in the north. Inlandsvägen is at the same time the European route E45 in Sweden. The term Inlandsvägen is also used about Riksväg 26 (National Road 26) that begins in Halmstad in the south and ends in Mora in the midst of Sweden, even though this is called Inlandsvägen Syd (The Inland Road South).

== The route ==
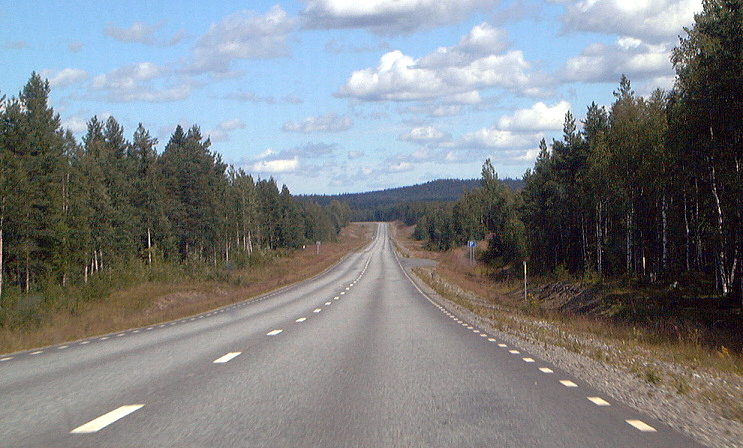
Inlandsvägen in southern Lapland

Starting in Gothenburg by the Kattegatt in southwestern Sweden, the road passes Lake Vänern to the west through Värmland and Dalarna to Mora at Lake Siljan. The road then continues via Orsa through Härjedalen and Jämtland to Östersund at the Lake Storsjön. From then on the route goes through Lapland and its wilderness, via the towns Vilhelmina, Storuman, Arvidsjaur, Jokkmokk and Gällivare to its northern terminus in Karesuando at the Finnish border.

Inlandsvägen is simultaneously the European route E45 in Sweden, between Gällivare and Svappavaara it is also the European route E10. The European route E45 and Riksväg 26 follows the same route for approximately 35 kilometers (22 mi) between Johannisholm and Mora, the latter being the end of the road for Riksväg 26.

Only the first few kilometers of road after Gothenburg is motorway. Most parts of Inlandsvägen have just two lanes with two-way-traffic; a 6 meters (20 ft) wide asphalted road that follows the terrain. About 5 kilometers (3.1 mi) south of Jokkmokk Inlandsvägen crosses the Arctic Circle at 66.3°N 19.85°E.

Inlandsvägen Syd (The Inland Road South) is a term used about Riksväg 26 (National Road 26) that begins in Halmstad in the south and ends in Mora in the midst of Sweden, The most parts of Inlandsvägen Syd also just have two lanes with two-way-traffic.

== History ==
The name is related to the famous Inland Line (Inlandsbanan), a railroad line that used to run almost parallel between Kristinehamn and Mora (Riksväg 26), and still today nearly always runs parallel to the road between Mora and Gällivare (European route E45).

The communities and small towns with direct connections to the road have financed the marketing of Inlandsvägen. They tried to make drivers (especially tourists) use the road through the center of Sweden, and hoped that more people would choose Inlandsvägen instead of the European route E4 to the east, which is in better condition and also faster as an alternative route. Originally Inlandsvägen was not a European Route. Until the end of 2006 the road was the Swedish national road 45.

== See also ==
- Swedish national road 45 - The former Riksväg 45 in Sweden
