= Riksettan =

Scenic route in Sweden

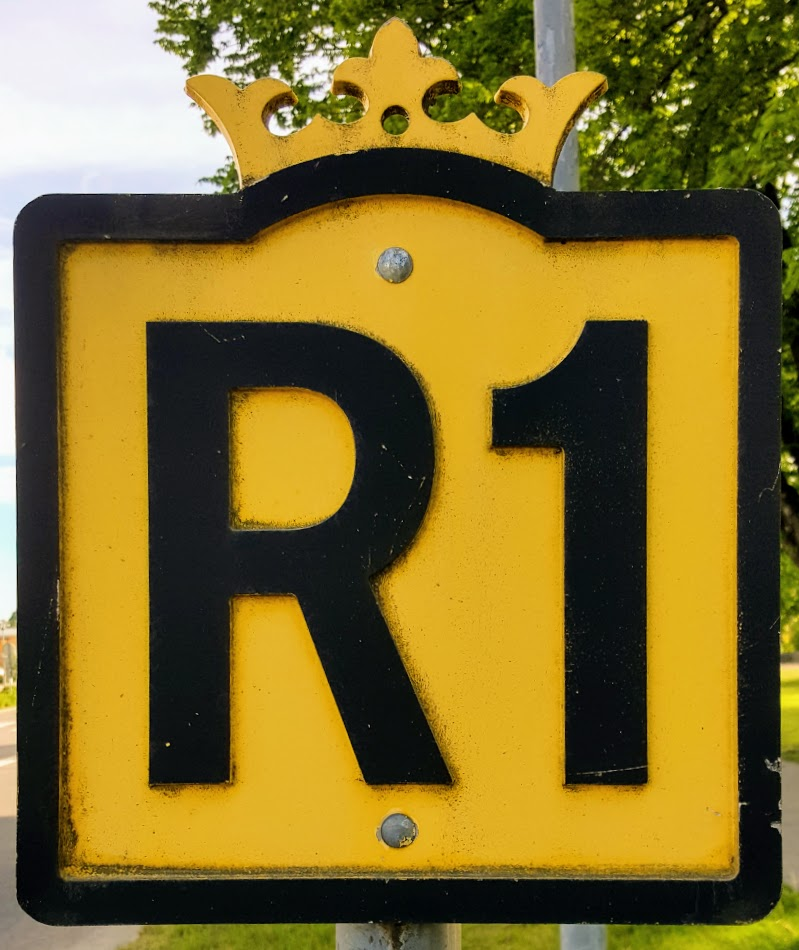
The design of Riksettan's sign is based on the old sign for Riksväg 1.

Riksettan or Turistväg Riksettan is the name of a scenic route that goes from Vaggeryd in the north, through Värnamo, Ljungby, Markaryd, and ends in Örkelljunga in the south. The route is part of the classic national road Riksväg 1 and goes parallel with the E4 and the river Lagan.

The route is primarily intended for tourists as a more scenic and cultural alternative to the highway. The road is suitable for both cars, motorcycles and bicycles. It is possible for additional municipalities along the old Riksväg 1 to join Riksettan and thus have it extended.

== Etymology ==
Riksettan is portmanteau and was originally the colloquial term for Riksväg 1. The first part of the word, Riks-, derives from the Swedish word Riksväg which means "national road", or more literally "road of the realm". The second part, -ettan, derives from the definite form of "Ett", the Swedish word for the number "One".

== See also ==
- Riksväg 1
- Göta highway
