= European route E45 in Sweden =

Highway in Sweden

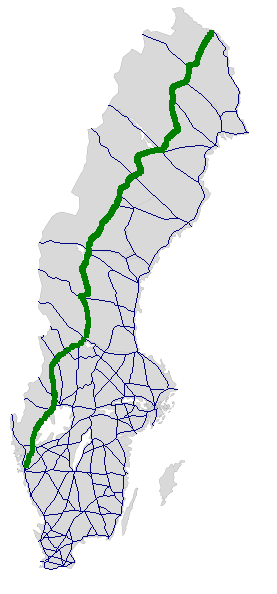

European route E45 in Sweden, previously Swedish national road 45, is a national road and the longest road in Sweden, with a length of 1,690 km (1,050 mi).

It is one of the longest national roads in Europe. It covers the stretch between Gothenburg and Karesuando via Trollhättan, Vänersborg, Mellerud, Åmål, Säffle, Grums, Sunne, Torsby, Stöllet, Malung, Mora, Sveg, Brunflo, Östersund, Strömsund, Dorotea, Vilhelmina, Storuman, Sorsele, Arvidsjaur, Jokkmokk, Gällivare, Svappavaara, and Vittangi.

It is also called Inlandsvägen (The Inland Road) as it traverses almost the entire length of Sweden. Most sections of the road pass through substantial and thinly populated wilderness areas in western Sweden. In many places the E45 road runs alongside the Inlandsbanan railway (The Inland Railway).

== Road standard and plans ==
The road is single carriageway ordinary road almost all of it. There is a motorway between Gothenburg and Trollhättan.

It goes straight through many villages along the route. It goes through only one big city, Gothenburg, and a few smaller towns, Trollhättan, Säffle, Mora and Gällivare. It goes outside Åmål and Östersund. North of E18 the road goes through sparsely populated areas and the places passed are rather small. The width of the road is usually 9-12 m south of E18, 7-9 m between E18 and E14 and 6-7 m north of E14. The road E45 turns at road junctions 27 times in Sweden.

There are a few smaller improvement plans. There is a plan for a bypass of Sveg, which will shorten the route by 18 km, under construction since year 2025 (the construction start has been delayed several times mainly for political reasons). There will also be some improvements of the existing road at a few places. The bridge over Ströms Vattendal in Strömsund will connect the highway. Apart from that very little is planned before 2030.

== Strömsund bridge renovated, damaged and closed ==
Between 2021 and 2026 the Strömsund bridge was subject to a major renovation. Cable stays have been renewed and the bridge was reinforced to be capable of bearing 74 tons. The bridge is 332 m long (1088 ft long).

On 29 September 2026 the Strömsund bridge was damaged when a special transport weighing a 100 tons drove over it. Trafikverket (Swedish highway authority) had issued a license to transport a transformer unit weighing 62400 kg to Mo i Rana in Norway. It is expected that the bridge will remain closed for at least 1 month, but, depending on the outcome of the inspection of the bridge, the actual repair may take longer.

== History ==
The Swedish road 45 has become an extension of the European route E45 and has been redesignated as such. The re-signing of the road started with several ceremonies along the road on November 24, 2006, and was completed during September 2007. National road 45 will not appear on signs after that, since European route are signed only with the E-sign in Sweden (although they are formally a national road with the same number). Some old "45" signs have been forgotten and left behind, mostly on city streets, since cities were not given money to change their signs.

The road Göteborg-Karesuando was given the number 45 in year 1991. Before that it had several numbers. From south they were 45 (Göteborg-Grums), 234 (Grums-Mora), 81 (Mora-Östersund) and 88 (Östersund-Karesuando). Before the year 1985 the road Östersund-Karesuando had several numbers, 88, 343, 97, 98, 395 and 396. Before year 1962 the road Göteborg-Grums was called road 7.
