= Swedish national road 16 =

Road in Sweden

National Road 16
- Riksväg 16
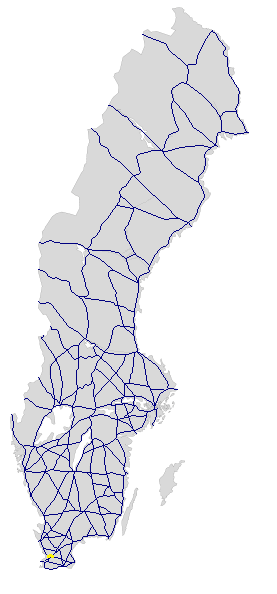

Location
- Country: Sweden

Highway system
- Roads in Sweden; National Roads; County Roads

Swedish national road 16 (Swedish: Riksväg 16), was a Swedish national road in Skåne in southern Sweden between Dalby in Lund Municipality and Flädie in Lomma Municipality. The length of the road was 23 km (14 mi).

In 2012, the road was cancelled as a national road, and the number instead used for the European route E16 which was extended at that time between Norway and Gävle on the east coast of central Sweden. The road between Dalby and Lund was renumbered into road 102, and the bypass of Lund and the road between Lund and Flädie is not signposted with any number anymore.
