= Swedish national road 40 =

Road in Sweden

National Road 40
- Riksväg 40
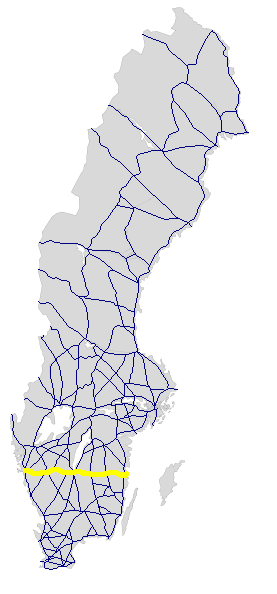

Location
- Country: Sweden

Highway system
- Roads in Sweden; National Roads; County Roads

National Road 40 (Swedish: Riksväg 40), is a Swedish national road in southern Sweden, between Gothenburg and Västervik. The length of the road is 321 km. The stretch Gothenburg–Jönköping is a part of the fastest and most used route when driving between Gothenburg and Stockholm. The road is a motorway along 96 km between Gothenburg and Ulricehamn. It is a 2+1-road with a middle barrier along 84 km between Ulricehamn and Nässjö.

Until 1 April 2009, National Road 40 only ran between Gothenburg and Jönköping. It was merged with National Road 33 which ran from Jönköping to Västervik.

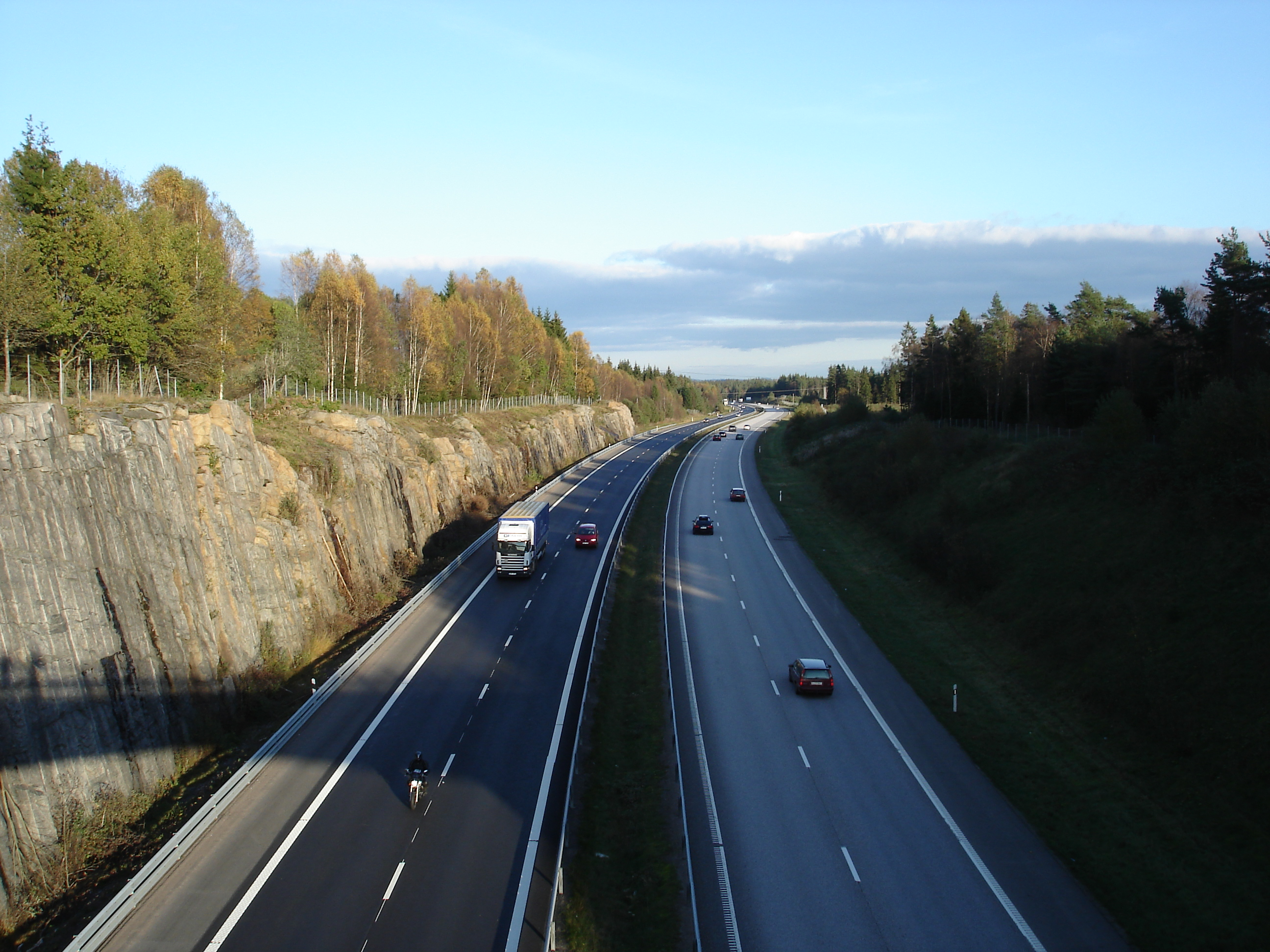
Swedish national road 40 between Bollebygd and Borås
