= Swedish national road 68 =

Road in Sweden

National Road 68
- Riksväg 68
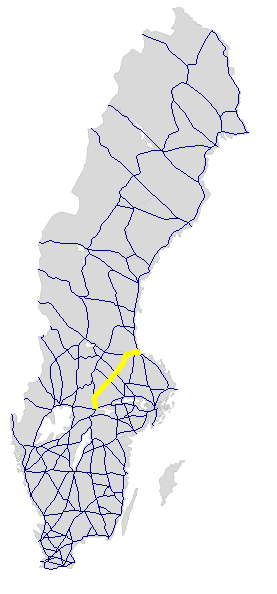

Location
- Country: Sweden

Highway system
- Roads in Sweden; National Roads; County Roads

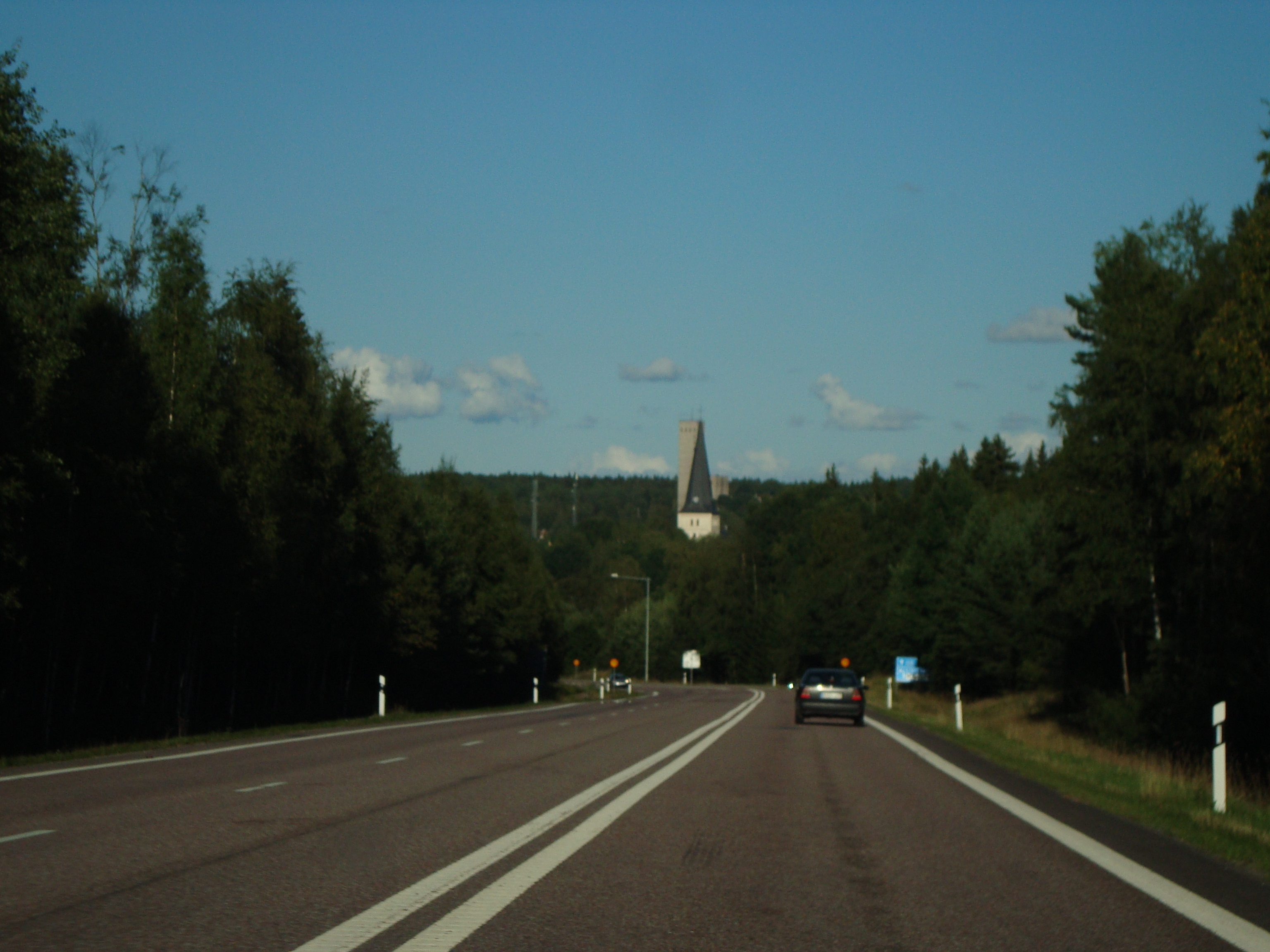
Swedish national road 68, near Norberg

National Road 68 (Swedish: Riksväg 68), is a Swedish national road between Örebro in Örebro Municipality and Gävle in Gävle Municipality. The length of the road is 230 km. The road is important for long-distance driving, and is part of the most used route between Gothenburg and the coast of northern Sweden.
