= Swedish national road 11 =

Road in Sweden

National Road 11
- Riksväg 11
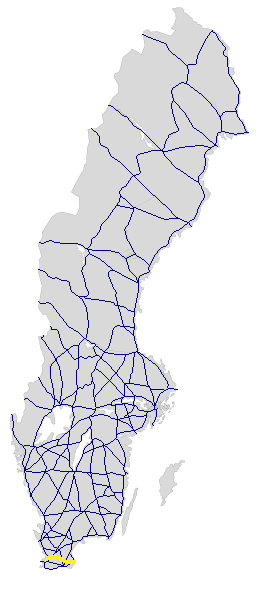

Location
- Country: Sweden

Highway system
- Roads in Sweden; National Roads; County Roads

National Road 11 (Swedish: Riksväg 11), is a Swedish national road in Skåne in southern Sweden between Malmö and Simrishamn. The length of the road is 88 km (55 mi).

Earlier the road had the road number 12, but in conjunction with the renumbering of the European routes in 1992 the Swedish National Road Administration changed the number of the national roads that would have the number in common with any European routes in Sweden, in this case E12.

== History ==
Previously, from 1962, the national road had the number 12, but in connection with the renumbering of the European roads in April-June 1992, the Swedish Road Administration changed the numbers of the national roads that would otherwise have the same number as a European road in Sweden. in this case E12. Before 1962, the road was called county road 41.
