= Karesuando Church =

Coordinates: 68.4418°N 22.4817°E

- Karesuando kyrka
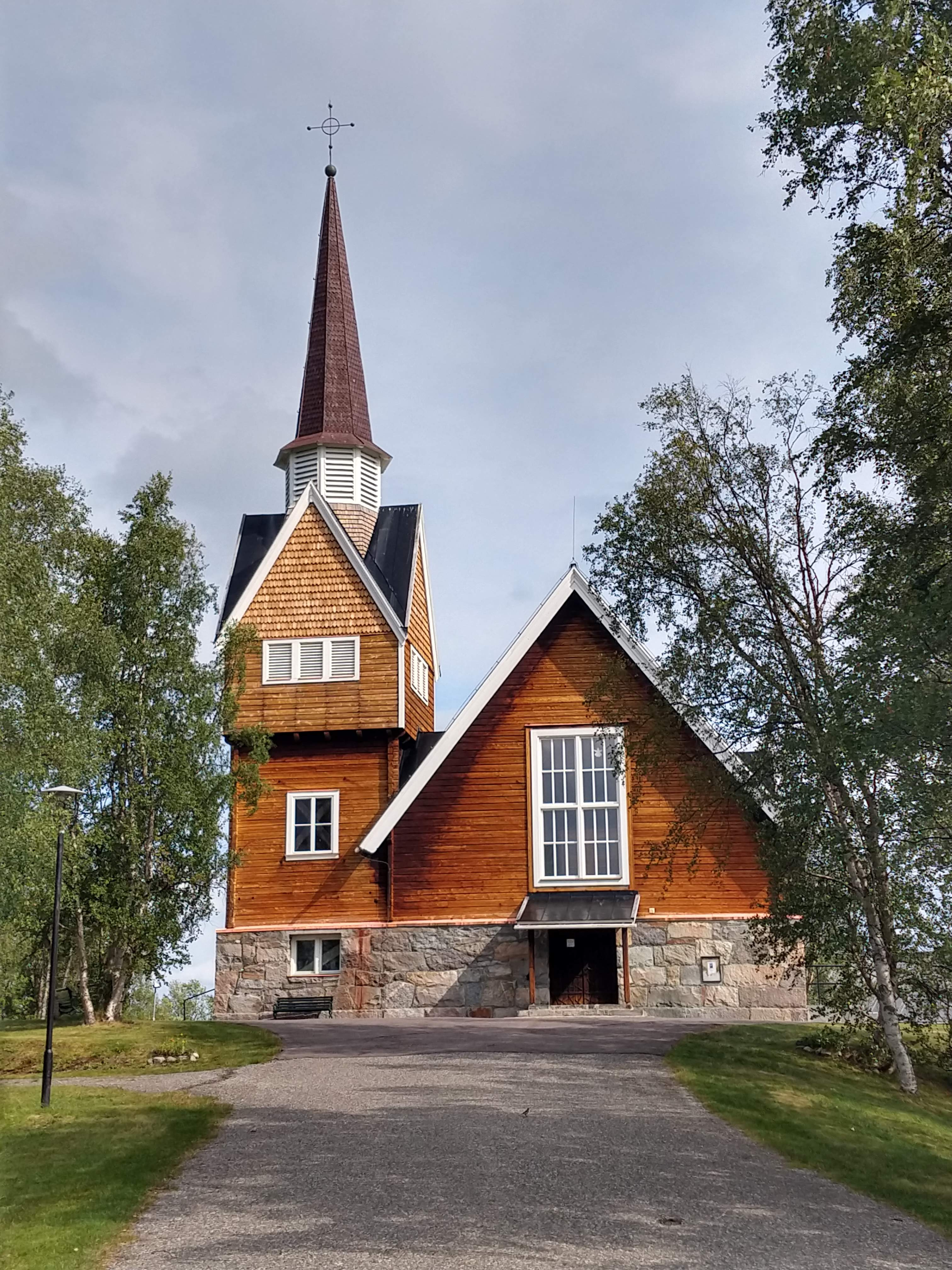
- Karesuando Church in July 2018
- Karesuando Church
- Location: Karesuando
- Country: Sweden
- Denomination: Church of Sweden

History
- Consecrated: 3 December 1905

Administration
- Diocese: Luleå
- Parish: Karesuando

The Karesuando Church (Swedish: Karesuando kyrka) is a wooden church building in Karesuando, Sweden. It belongs to the Karesuando Parish of the Church of Sweden, and it is the northernmost church in Sweden. It was inaugurated on 3 December 1905 by Bishop Olof Bergqvist of the Diocese of Luleå., replacing an older church.

== Gallery ==
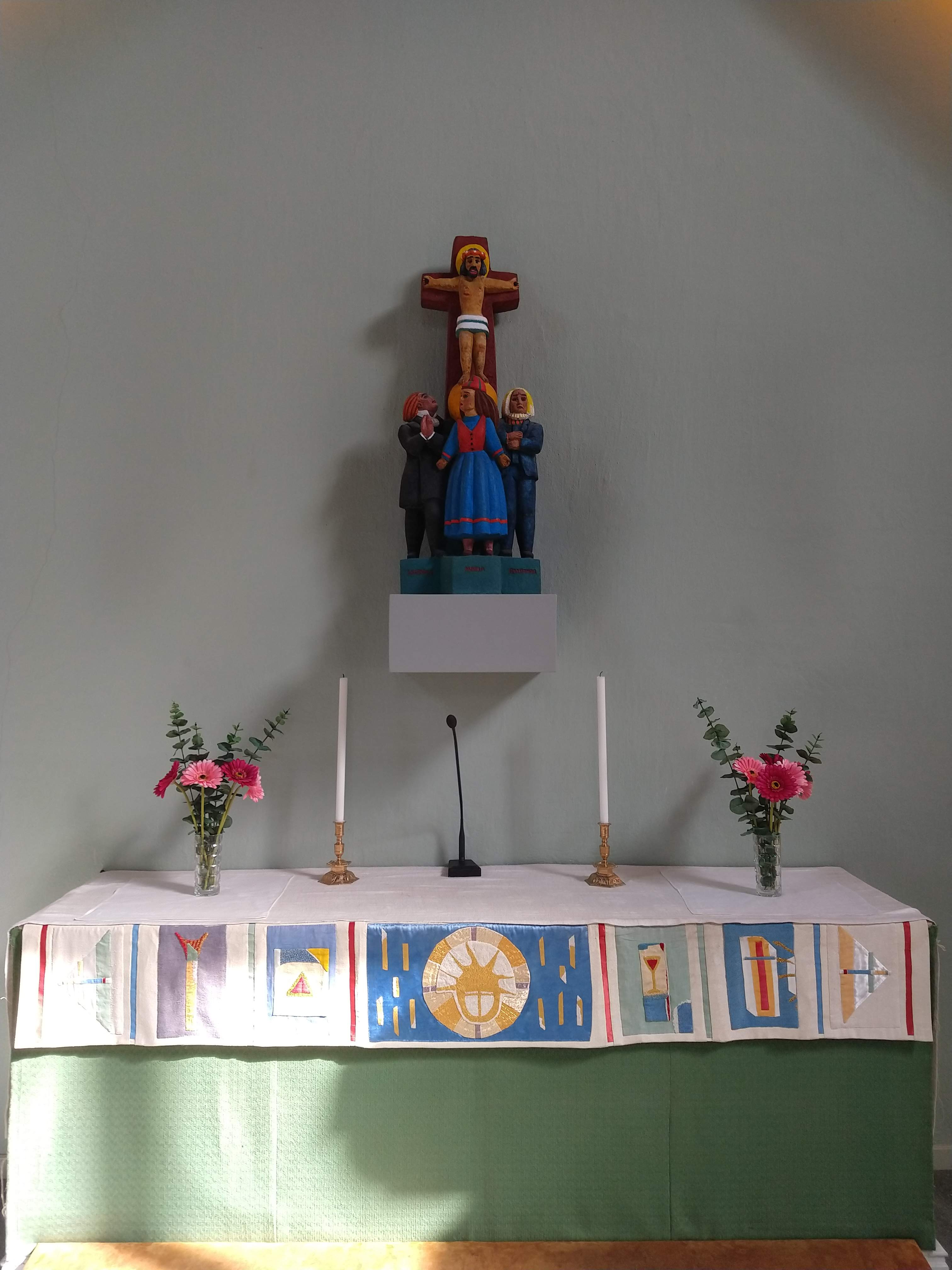
Altar of the church

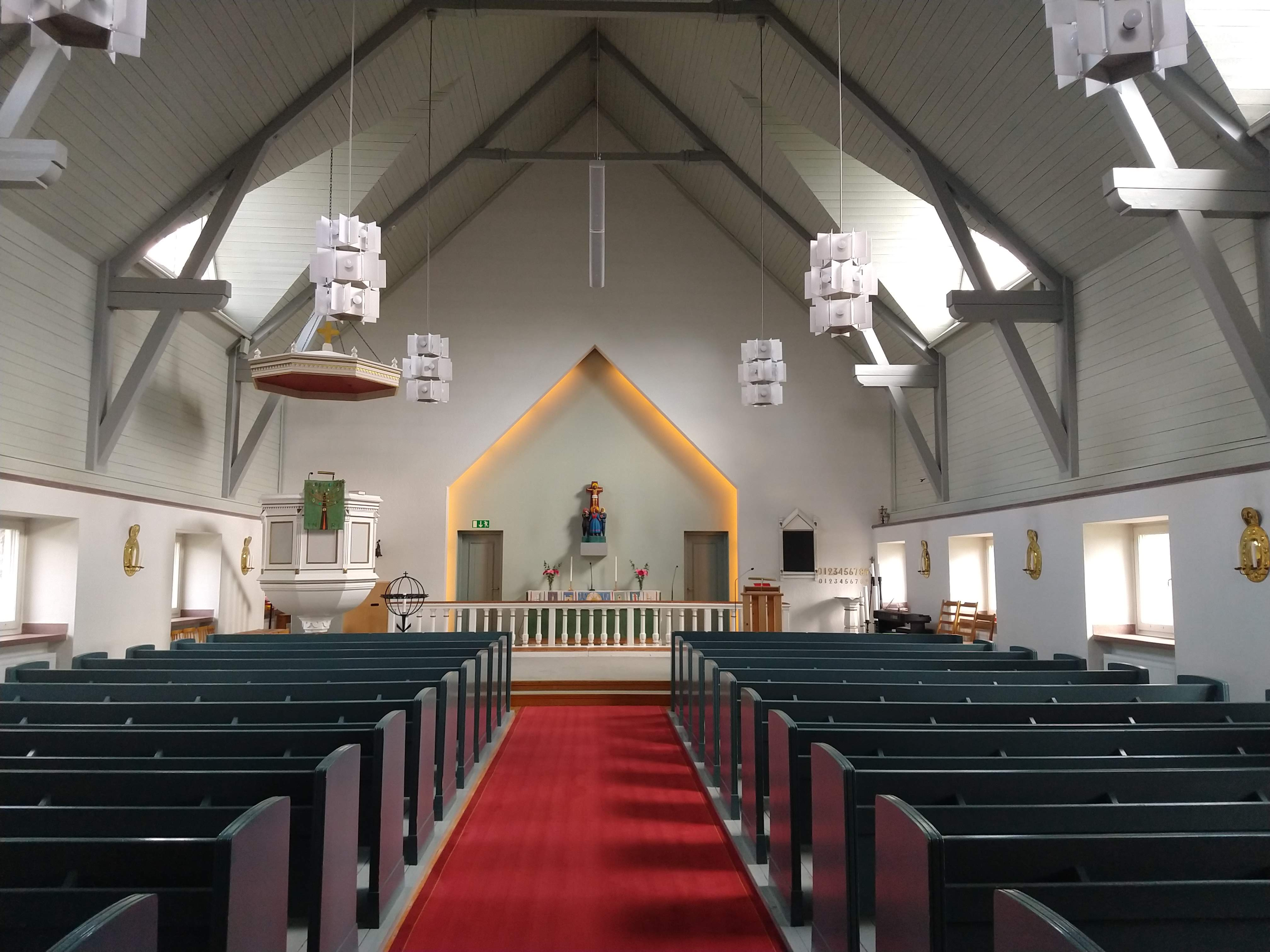
Interior

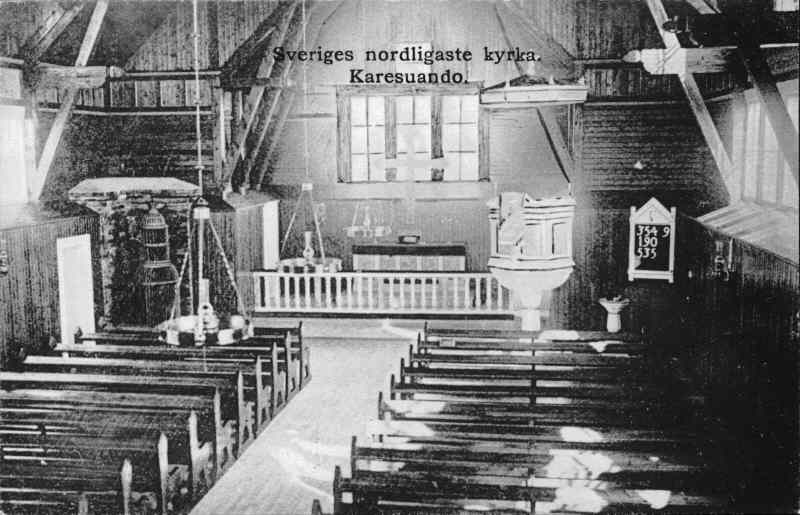
Older picture of the interior

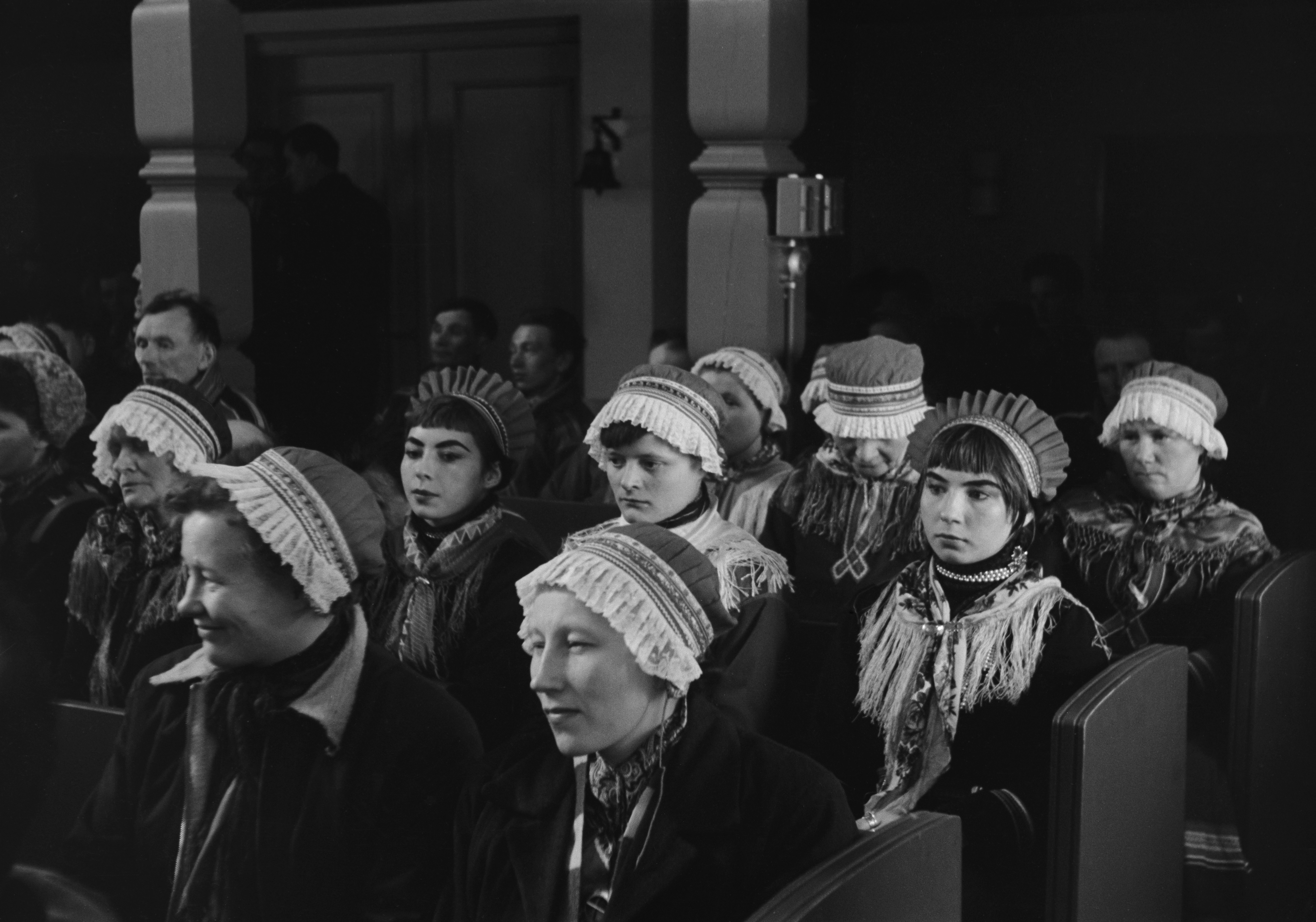
Sami people in the church
