= Swedish national road 9 =

Road in Sweden

National Road 9
- Riksväg 9
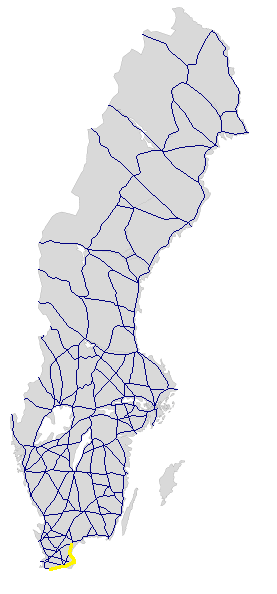

Location
- Country: Sweden

Highway system
- Roads in Sweden; National Roads; County Roads

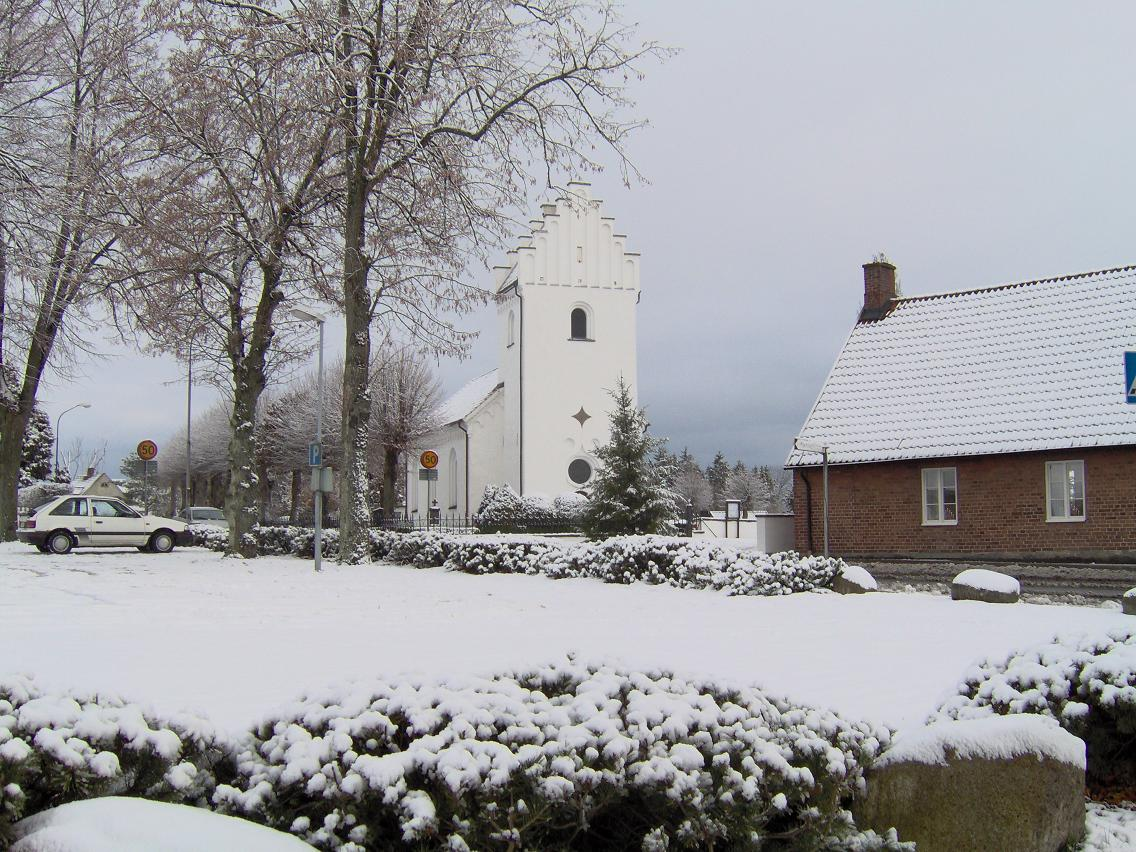
Road 9 mostly follows exactly the same route since centuries (the road number is newer). This means it passes through villages and past churches. Here it passes in front of the Hammenhög church.

National Road 9 (Swedish: Riksväg 9), is a Swedish national road in Skåne in southern Sweden between Trelleborg and Nöbbelöv in Kristianstad. The length of the road is 140 km (87 mi).

This is the only national road in Sweden with a single-digit road number. Earlier the road had the road number 10, but in conjunction with the renumbering of the European routes in 1992 the Swedish National Road Administration changed the number of the national roads that would have the number in common with any European routes in Sweden, in this case E10.
