= Juoksengi =

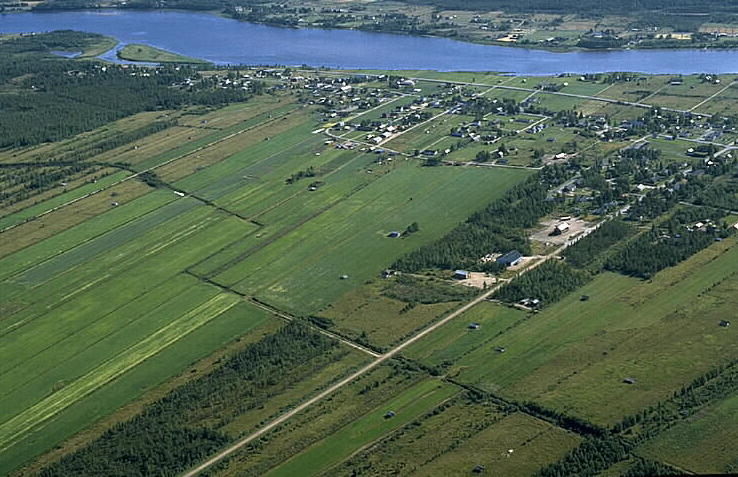

- Location within Norrbotten Location within Sweden
- Coordinates: 66°34′N 23°51′E
- Country: Sweden
- Province: Norrbotten
- County: Norrbotten County
- Municipality: Övertorneå Municipality

Area
  - Total: 1.06 km^{2} (0.41 sq mi)

Population (31 December 2010)
  - Total: 350
  - Density: 331/km^{2} (860/sq mi)
- Time zone: UTC+1 (CET)
  - Summer (DST): UTC+2 (CEST)

Juoksengi (Swedish pronunciation: [jʉˈǒːksɛŋɡɪ]) is a locality situated in Övertorneå Municipality, Norrbotten County, Sweden with 350 inhabitants in 2010.

It is located on the Torne River, at the border with Finland, which runs through the middle of the river. On the Finnish side of the river the village Juoksenki is located. They were considered one village until the national border was drawn in 1809.

The Arctic Circle runs through Juoksengi.

== Sports ==
The following sports clubs are located in Juoksengi:

- Polcirkeln/Svanstein FF
