= Göta highway =

Historical road in Sweden

Coordinates: 59.292°N 18.047°E

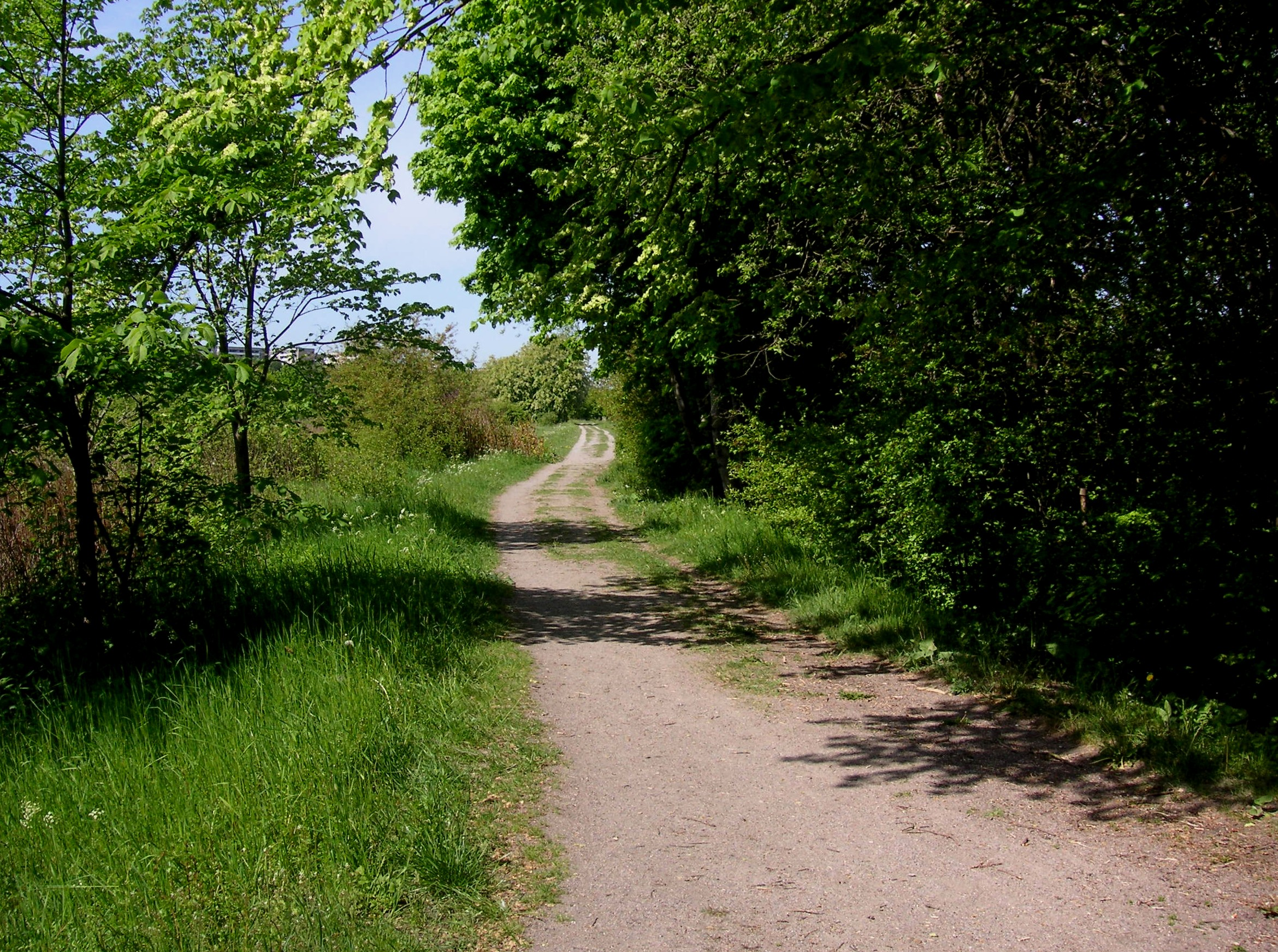
Göta highway, Årsta field

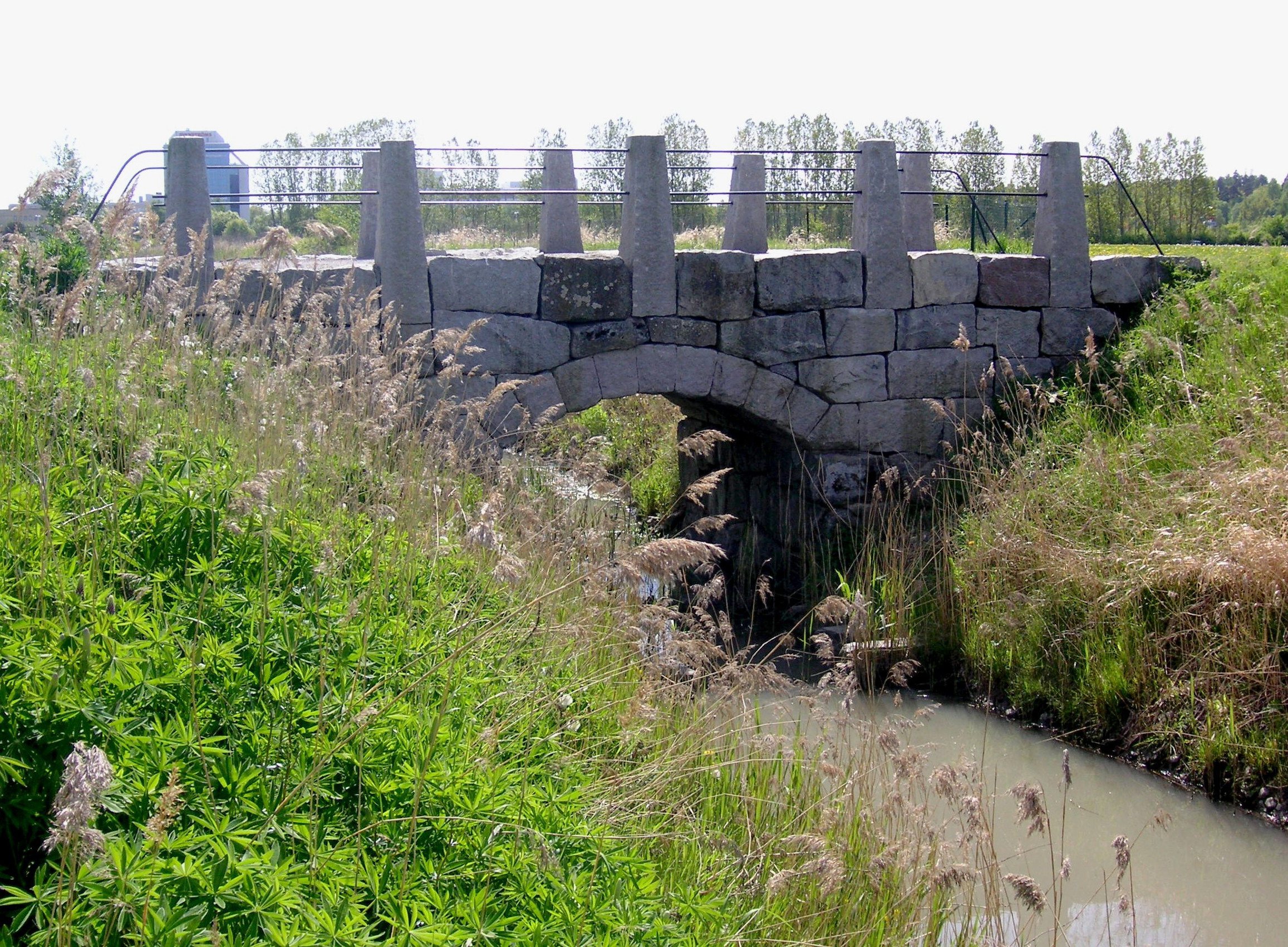
Stone-arched bridge, Årsta field

Göta highway (Swedish: Göta landsväg) was, up to the late-17th century, the only road between Stockholm and south of Sweden. Dating back at least to the Middle Ages, and some parts even back to the Viking Age, the highway is the oldest known road from Stockholm to the south. Göta highway lost importance after the year 1670, when the new highway via Hornstull came in use.

Göta highway started in the centre of Stockholm at the Old Castle of Stockholm in Gamla Stan and led through Södermalm (here, the street is now named Götgatan) and the south suburbs of the city via the present-day Huddinge Municipality, Botkyrka Municipality and Salem Municipality to the city of Södertälje, and then further on to Götaland, one of the three lands of Sweden.

For those who in the 16th century were to travel by land south of Stockholm, Göta country road was the only alternative. The road dates back at least to the Middle Ages. It was probably already trampled on in the Bronze Age or even earlier.

Portions of the highway as it once was, have been saved to posterity in only a few places. For example, it can be seen crossing the Årsta field (Årstafältet) in Enskede-Årsta, south of Södermalm. On Årsta field there is a 900 meter long part of Göta landsväg, and where it passed the Valla brook there is a stone-arched bridge that was built in the 18th or 19th century. It originally was a wade or a simpler wooden bridge. Since long in ruins, it was restored in 1998 after a model of a similar bridge on another part of the highway in Botkyrka. The Göta highway on Årsta field is an ancient monument.

== See also ==
- Gamla Turingevägen Inscriptions
