= Voxna =

Community of Sweden (1863–1951)

Coordinates: 61°21′N 15°34′E

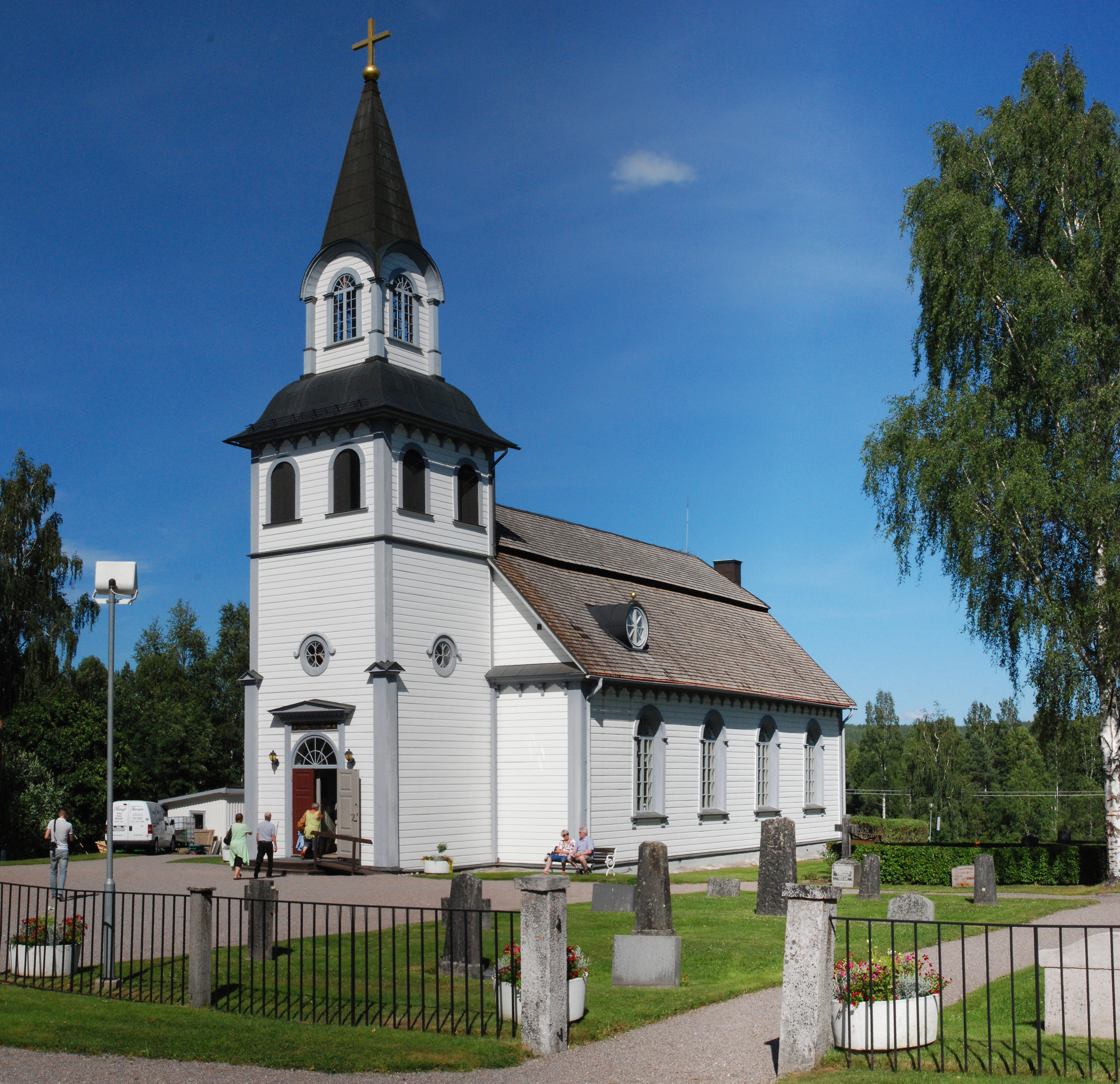
Church in Voxna, 2010

Voxna (Swedish pronunciation: [ˈvɔ̂ksna]) was a former community (1863–1951) in southern Hälsingland in Ovanåker Municipality in Sweden, along the Bollnäs central railway.

== History ==
The community was named for the Voxnan river to the North.
