= Muodoslompolo =

Coordinates: 67°56′N 23°26′E

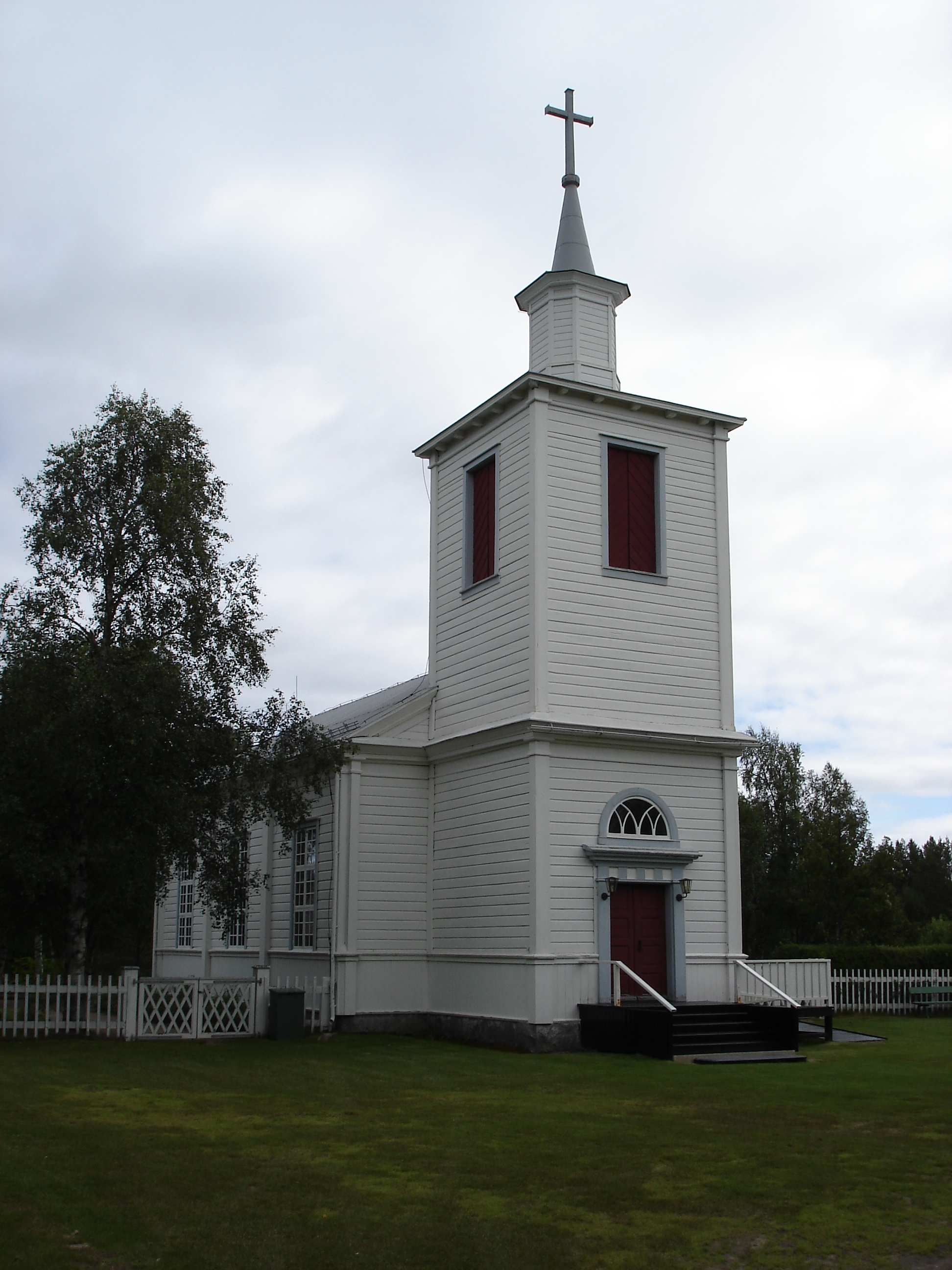
The church in Muodoslompolo

Muodoslompolo (Swedish pronunciation: [mʉˈǒːdɔslɔmpɔlɔ]) is a village in Pajala Municipality in the county of Norrbotten in Sweden, located some 110 km north of Pajala. It had 61 inhabitants in 2010.
