= Rolsberga =

Coordinates: 55°49′N 13°28′E

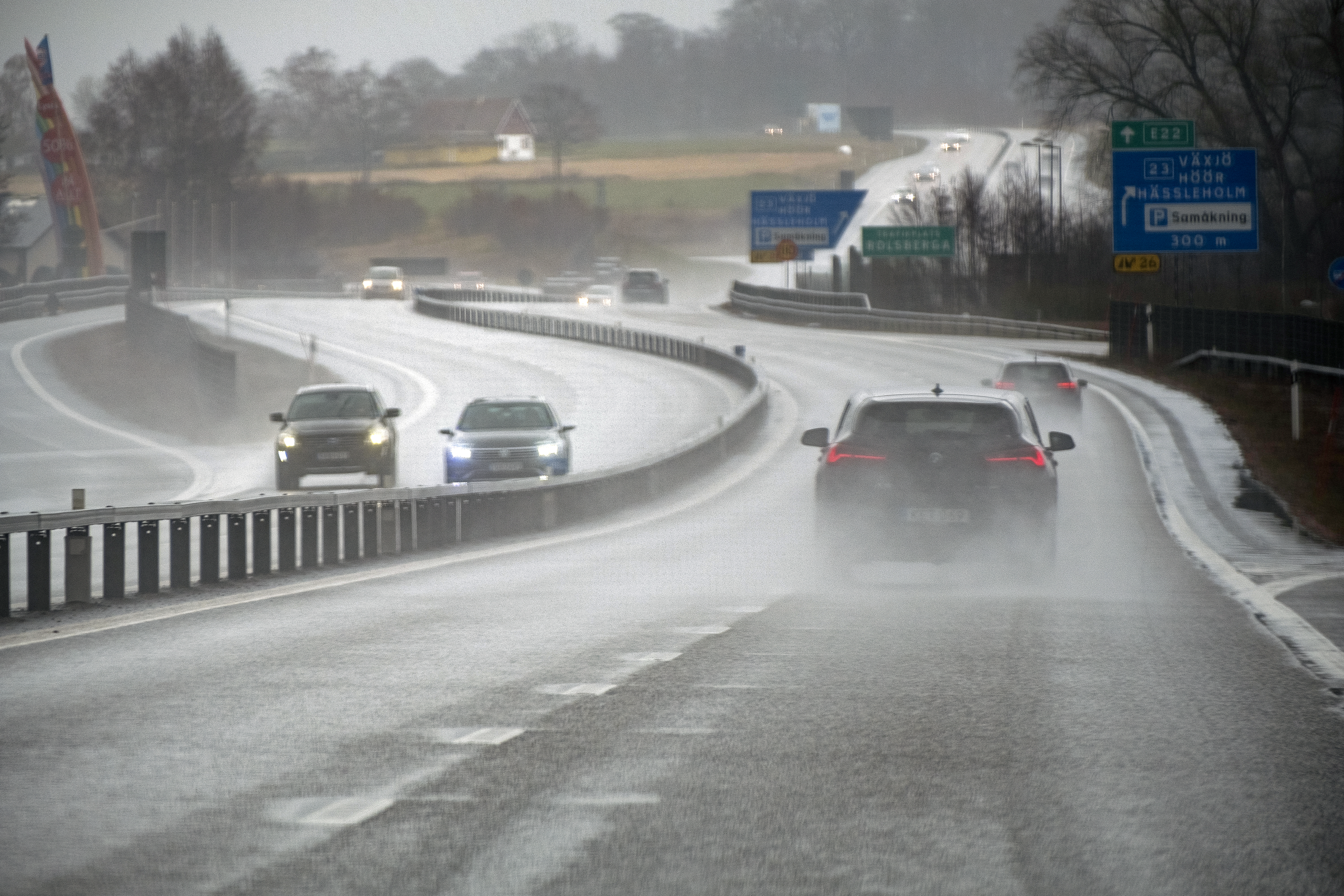

Rolsberga is a village in the parish of Gudmundtorp, on the borders of Eslöv and Höörs kommun, in Skåne County Sweden. Map

Split along the E22 motorway running between Malmö and Kalmar, Rolsberga is now largely a rural village with a population of under 100, and few remaining farms.
