= Gamla Turingevägen Inscriptions =

Swedish runic inscriptions

Coordinates: 59°11′46″N 17°36′48″E

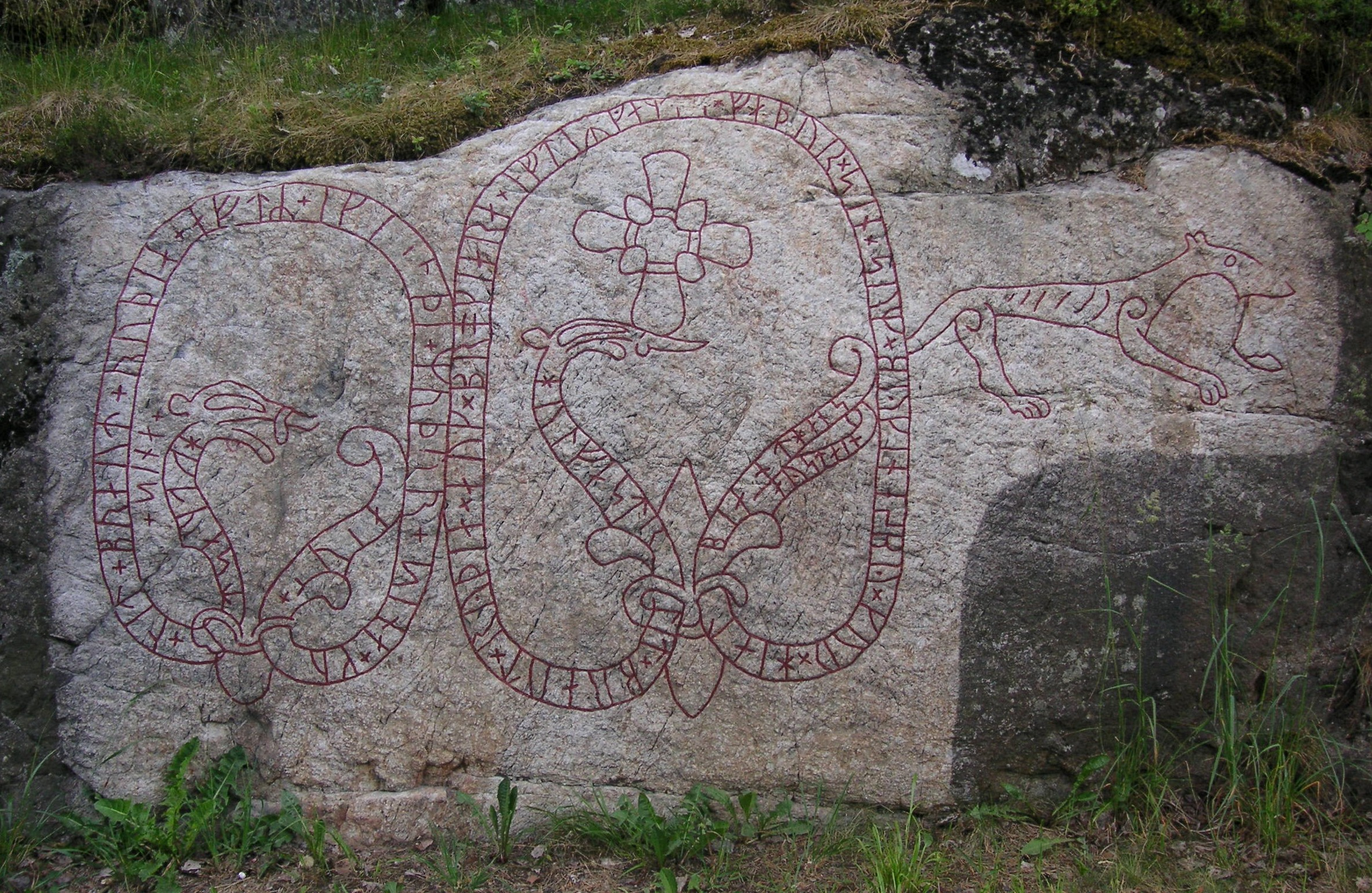
The Holmfast inscriptions carved into a rock face by a road in Södertälje, Södermanland, Sweden

The Holmfast Inscriptions are two Viking Age memorial runic inscriptions and one image that are designated as Sö 311, Sö 312, and Sö 313 in the Rundata catalog. They are located in Södertälje, Stockholm County and the province of Södermanland, Sweden by the eponymous road Holmfastvägen.

== Description ==
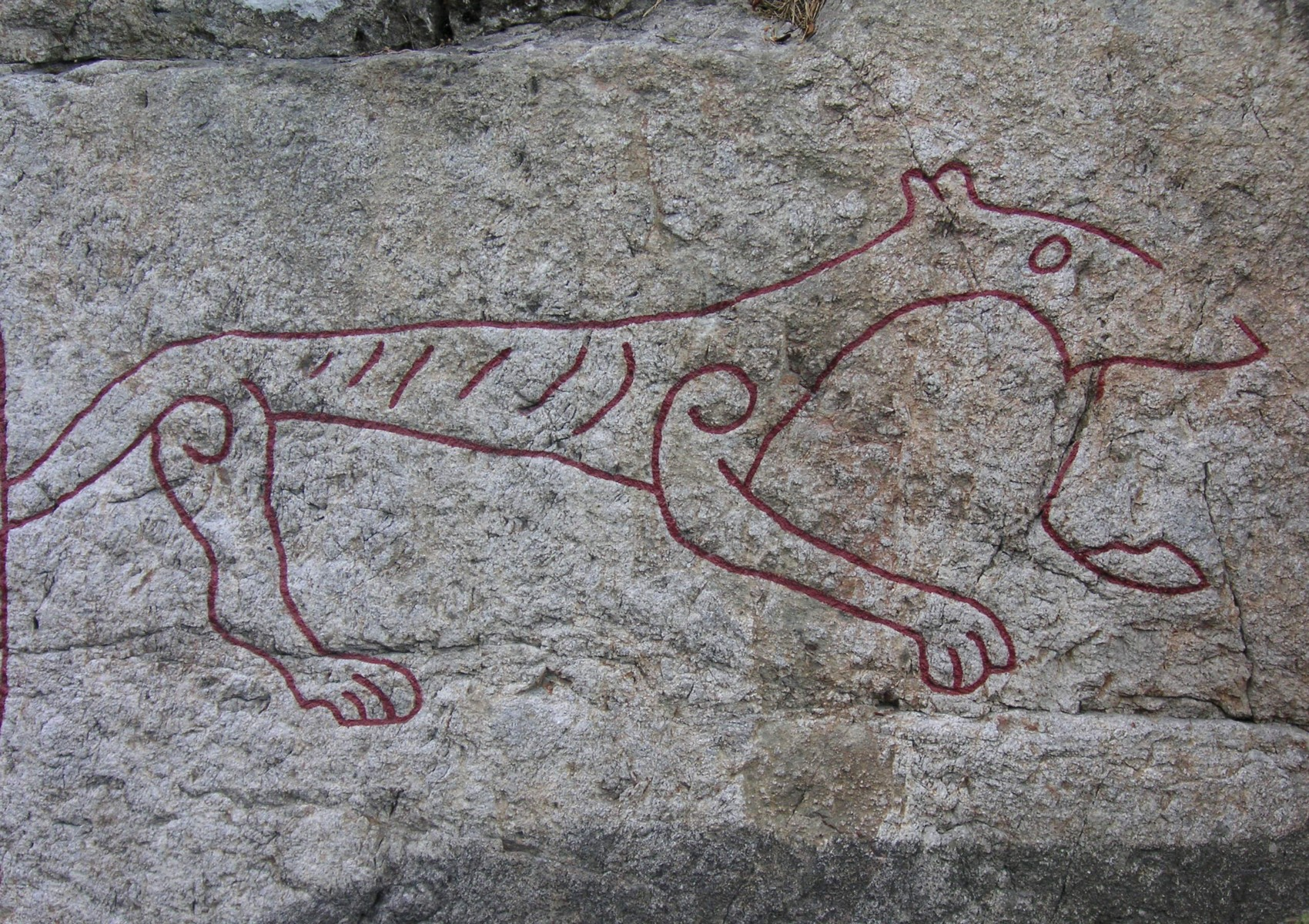
Detail showing the beast on the Sö 313 image.

The right carving Sö 313 is purely ornamental and probably represents a wolf. The lean wolf with hanging tongue seems to quickly rush out of the picture. The carving also includes a couple of ordinary rune snakes and a braided ring cross. The depicted cross means that Holmfast's family were Christian, which is further supported by the content of the text.

The style of the carvings indicate that they were made around 1050–1080 AD. They were signed by rune master Östen (Eysteinn in the runic text), who also signed Su 344 at Kiholm and Södertälje Canal in Västertälje parish, and the recently discovered Bornhuvud carving on Bornhuvud at Vitsand in Salem parish. Road and bridge-building as described in the runic text is fairly common in runestones during this time period. At this time, the Catholic Church sponsored the building of roads and bridges in a practice similar to the use of indulgences in return for the church's intercession for the soul of the departed.

Holmfast's road led from Tälje to Näsby, which was located on Lake Måsnaren, about three kilometres west of the carving. Where the ground was sunken, the road had to be reinforced with a bridge system in the form of stone fillings or wooden structures. Today's stretch of road still follows the original route. The Holmfast carving is created on a rock that cannot be moved, and the carving is very elaborate as it consists of two messages.

Rune carvings were status symbols that would be seen by many bypasses, so it is likely that Holmfast's road was part of a larger road system. There are many indications that it was a precursor to Göta landsväg, the oldest and most well-known road connection that went from Stockholm via Södertälje further south towards Götaland.

The three carvings are considered to have been made contemporaneously and all made by a runemaster with the normalized name of Östen (Eysteinn in the runic text), with his signature appearing on Sö 312. The inscriptions are known as Holmfastristningen or "Holmfast carvings" after the name of the road that passes near them.

== Sö 311 ==
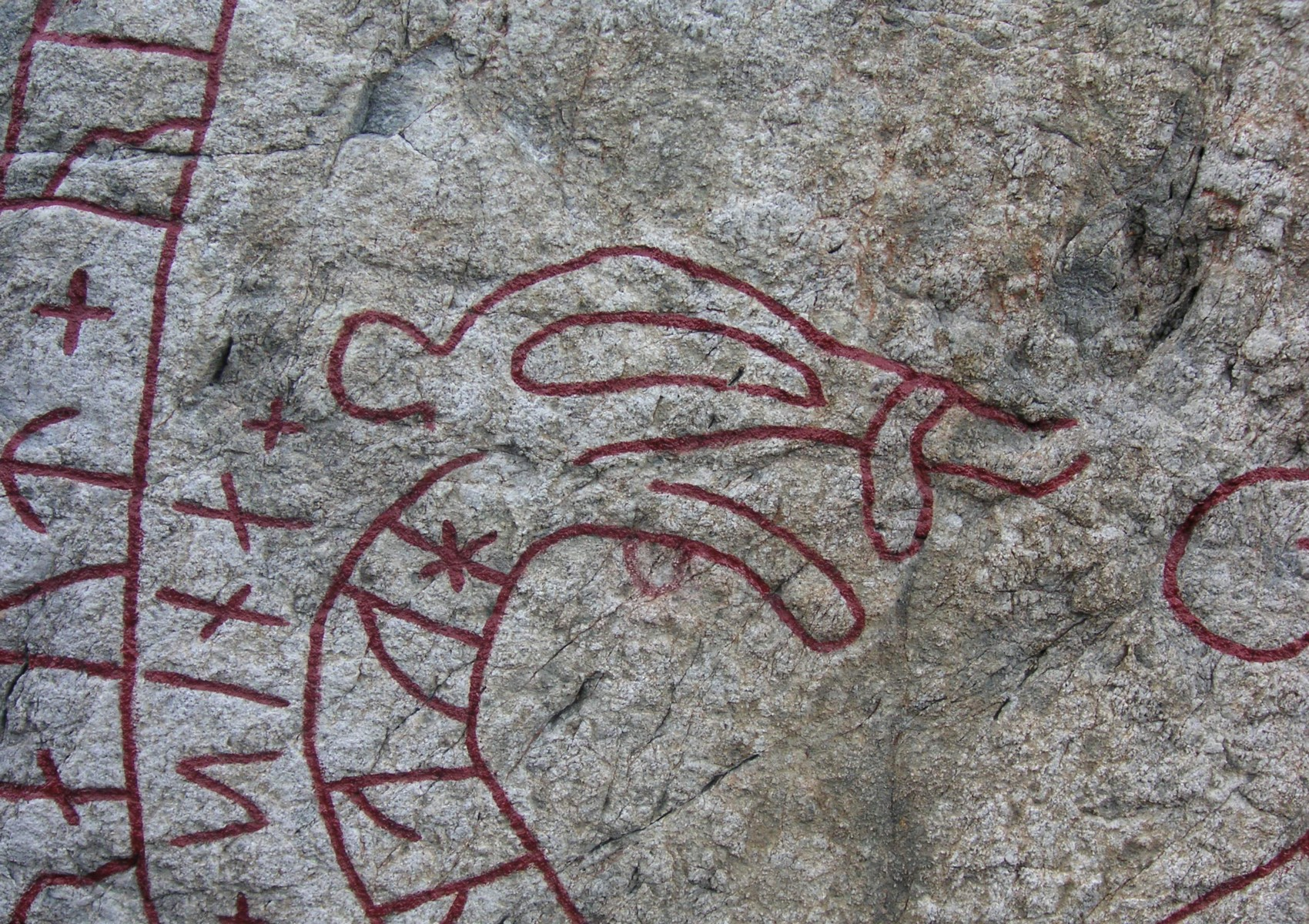
Detail showing serpent head on Sö 311.

Sö 311 consists of runic text carved onto a serpent band. The inscription, which is rather damaged, is 1.2 meters in height and is classified as being carved in runestone style Pr3, which is also called Urnes style. This runestone style is characterized by slim and stylized animals that are interwoven into tight patterns. The animal heads are typically seen in profile with slender almond-shaped eyes and upwardly curled appendages on the noses and the necks.

=== Inscription ===
hulfastr + lit + braut + ruþia + aftʀ + ik----(þ)i + mu(þ)-r + sina + ku-- + -r-a… + sina +
Holmfastr {} lét {} braut {} ryðja {} eptir {} Ing[i]…, {} móð[u]r {} sína {} gó[ða] {} … {} sína. {}
Holmfastr {} let {} braut {} ryðia {} æftiʀ {} Ing[i]…, {} moð[u]r {} sina {} go[ða] {} … {} sina. {}
Holmfastr had the path cleared in memory of Ingi-… his good mother …, his …

== Sö 312 ==
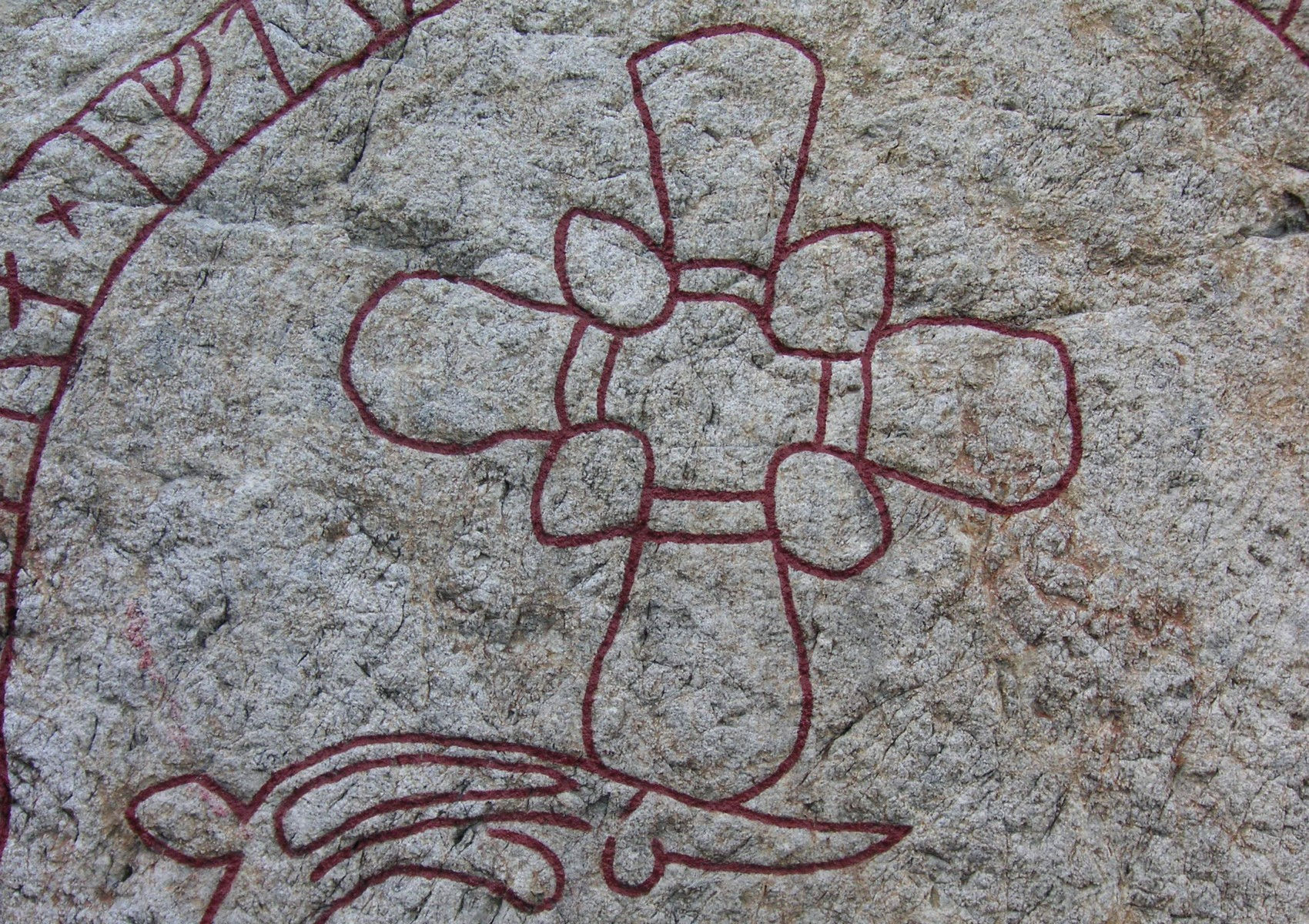
Detail showing cross and serpent head on Sö 312.

Sö 312 consists of runic text carved onto a serpent band that circles a Christian cross. The inscription is 1.5 meters in height and is classified as being carved in runestone style Pr4, which is also classified as being an Urnes style. The text in two locations follows the rule that two consecutive identical letters are represented by a single rune, even when the two identical letters are at the end of one word and the start of a second word. This inscription uses one i-rune for the words byki| |i. The inscription is signed by the runemaster Eysteinn, which is normalized as Östen, by simply adding his name at the end of the text without using any verb such as "carved" or "painted." Although such signatures are unusual on runestones, there is another example of an inscription being signed in this manner on Sö 266 in Sanda. This is the only surviving inscription known to have been signed by this runemaster, although two other Urnes style inscriptions, Sö 338 at Turinge and Sö 344 at Kiholm, have been attributed to Östen based upon stylistic grounds.

=== Inscription ===
hulfastr lit × braut × ryþia × auk × bro kiara iftiʀ gam-- × faþur × sin × sum × byki| |i : nesby × kuþ × hialbi ant hans aystain
Holmfastr lét {} braut {} ryðja {} ok {} brú gera eptir Gam[al], {} fǫður {} sinn, {} sem {} bjó í {} Nesbý. {} Guð {} hjalpi ǫnd hans! Eysteinn.
Holmfastr let {} braut {} ryðia {} ok {} bro gærva æftiʀ Gam[al], {} faður {} sinn, {} sum {} byggi i {} Næsby. {} Guð {} hialpi and hans. Øystæinn.
Holmfastr had the path cleared and the bridge made in memory of Gamall, his father, who lived in Nesbýr. May God help his spirit. Eysteinn.
