= Karesuando =

Karesuando (Swedish) Gárasavvon (Northern Sami) Kaaresuvanto (Finnish) Karesuanto (Meänkieli)
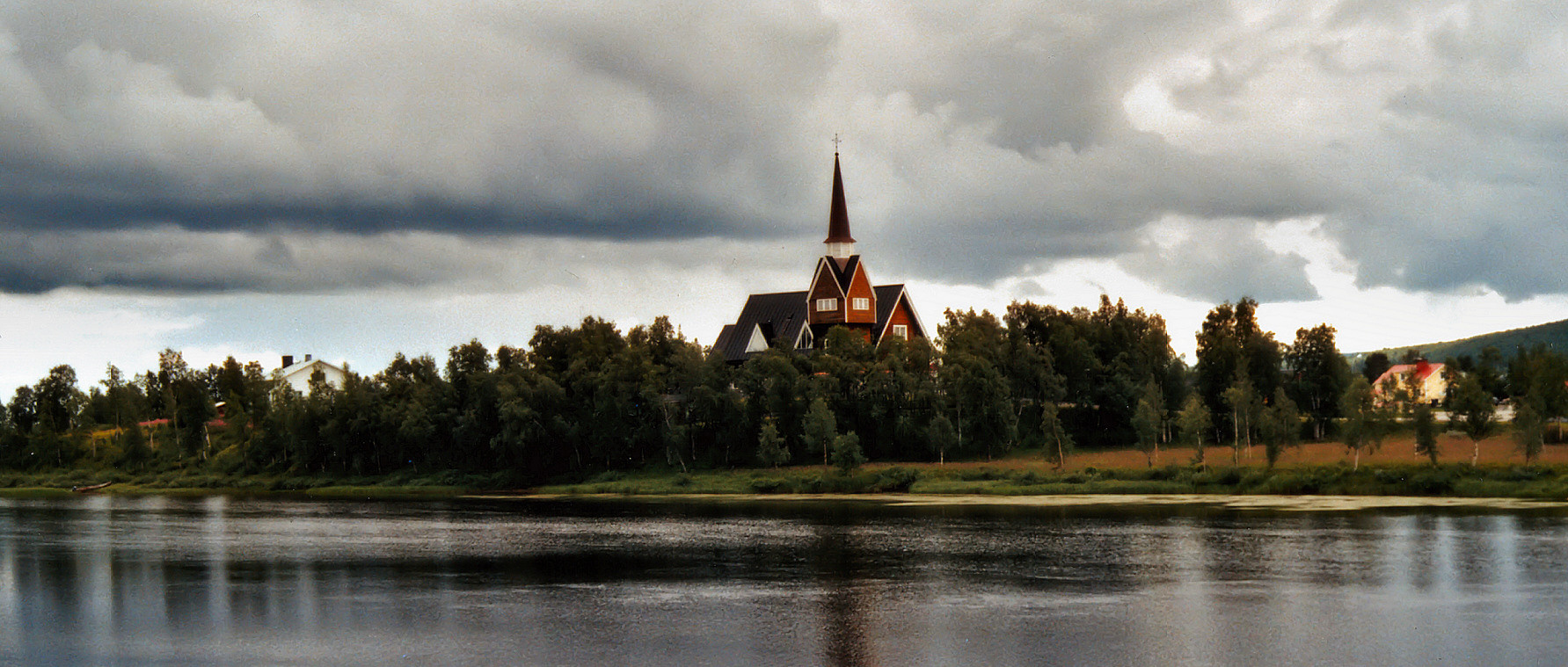
- Karesuando Church in August 2005

- Location within Norrbotten Location within Sweden
- Coordinates: 68°26′28″N 022°28′44″E
- Country: Sweden
- Province: Lapland
- County: Norrbotten County
- Municipality: Kiruna Municipality

Area
  - Total: 0.93 km^{2} (0.36 sq mi)

Population (31 December 2010)
  - Total: 300
  - Density: 324/km^{2} (840/sq mi)
- Time zone: UTC+1 (CET)
  - Summer (DST): UTC+2 (CEST)

Karesuando (Swedish: [ˈkǎrːɛsʉandɔ]; Finnish: Kaaresuvanto or Karesuvanto; Northern Sámi: Gárasavvon; Meänkieli: Karesuanto) is the northernmost locality in Sweden. It is situated in Kiruna Municipality, Norrbotten County, Sweden, with 303 inhabitants in 2010 and 350 in 2011.

It is a church village, located alongside the Muonio River on the border with Finland.

The Finnish village of Karesuvanto (population about 140) is located on the Finnish side of the river. According to Finnish tradition, they are one and the same village (with a combined population of about 470), but are usually considered to be separate villages since there is a national border between them (although both are called Karesuvanto in Finnish).

The village's buildings were built in 1670, when Måns Mårtensson Karesuando, called "Hyvä Maunu Martinpoika" in Finnish and "Good Maunu, Son of Martin" in English, bought land from Sami Henrik Nilsson Nikkas. The first church was built in 1816 because the previous parish church is located on the Finnish side of the border created in 1809. The Lutheran vicar and botanist Lars Levi Laestadius served in Karesuando from 1826 to 1849. It was here that he founded the revivalist movement known to this day as Laestadianism.

The area is traditionally Finnish speaking, and the border was drawn for political reasons in 1809, not because of any cultural or any other border existing at that time. There was not even a parish border, so Karesuando Church was built because the older church was on the Finnish side. School and church influences have since resulted in cultural and linguistic differences.

The area had a training camp for the Norwegian police troops in Sweden during World War II.

Karesuando is located along the European route E45, and is the northern terminus of Swedish national road 99.

== Climate ==
Karesuando has a continental type of a subarctic climate (Köppen Dfc) with short and cool summers and long, cold and sometimes very cold winters. Snowfall varies from year to year, but is often quite moderate due to dry polar air. Still, accumulation in spring is usually quite high since the snow cover does not thaw at all during winter due to the cold averages. The warmest temperature of the month usually goes above freezing in winter, but for very brief spells.

Summers on the other hand, see quite a bit of rainfall. With Karesuando being quite far inland, it is prone both to sizeable warmth for short spells and temperatures either approaching or below −40 °C (−40 °F). Despite this cold, however, Karesuando sees some moderation from the North Atlantic Current passing by Scandinavia's western shore near land on those latitudes, which results in winter temperatures being less severe than some climates on latitudes way further south. Due to its high latitude, Karesuando experiences midnight sun and polar night. The UV index in summer is low due to the high latitude. Karesuando itself is below the arctic tree line. The road on the Finnish side of the river however has bushes and marginal taiga north of the Karesuando area. To its south, west and east, boreal forest begin. Higher areas nearby are tundra.

The snow depth is usually modest due to the relative dryness of winters. It was not measured between 2013 and 2018 until the SMHI restored the snow depth station in early 2019.

Climate data for Karesuando (2002–2020 averages; sunshine for Kiruna 1961–1990; extremes since 1901)
Month	Jan	Feb	Mar	Apr	May	Jun	Jul	Aug	Sep	Oct	Nov	Dec	Year
Record high °C (°F)	7.2 (45.0)	6.4 (43.5)	10.5 (50.9)	15.8 (60.4)	28.2 (82.8)	32.2 (90.0)	32.5 (90.5)	29.1 (84.4)	24.0 (75.2)	16.0 (60.8)	10.8 (51.4)	6.5 (43.7)	32.5 (90.5)
Mean maximum °C (°F)	1.7 (35.1)	2.5 (36.5)	4.5 (40.1)	9.8 (49.6)	20.5 (68.9)	24.7 (76.5)	25.5 (77.9)	24.3 (75.7)	18.2 (64.8)	9.8 (49.6)	3.4 (38.1)	2.6 (36.7)	27.1 (80.8)
Mean daily maximum °C (°F)	−9.7 (14.5)	−8.2 (17.2)	−3.0 (26.6)	2.9 (37.2)	9.5 (49.1)	15.5 (59.9)	19.2 (66.6)	16.5 (61.7)	10.7 (51.3)	2.2 (36.0)	−3.9 (25.0)	−6.5 (20.3)	3.8 (38.8)
Daily mean °C (°F)	−14.6 (5.7)	−13.2 (8.2)	−8.3 (17.1)	−1.8 (28.8)	4.8 (40.6)	10.6 (51.1)	14.2 (57.6)	11.7 (53.1)	6.6 (43.9)	−1.0 (30.2)	−7.8 (18.0)	−11.0 (12.2)	−0.8 (30.5)
Mean daily minimum °C (°F)	−19.5 (−3.1)	−18.1 (−0.6)	−13.6 (7.5)	−6.5 (20.3)	0.1 (32.2)	5.7 (42.3)	9.1 (48.4)	6.8 (44.2)	2.5 (36.5)	−4.2 (24.4)	−11.7 (10.9)	−15.5 (4.1)	−5.4 (22.3)
Mean minimum °C (°F)	−35.4 (−31.7)	−34.4 (−29.9)	−29.4 (−20.9)	−20.1 (−4.2)	−7.2 (19.0)	−0.3 (31.5)	2.8 (37.0)	−0.8 (30.6)	−5.2 (22.6)	−16.9 (1.6)	−26.9 (−16.4)	−30.5 (−22.9)	−38.0 (−36.4)
Record low °C (°F)	−49.0 (−56.2)	−48.1 (−54.6)	−42.8 (−45.0)	−36.5 (−33.7)	−22.0 (−7.6)	−4.0 (24.8)	−1.0 (30.2)	−4.6 (23.7)	−12.0 (10.4)	−28.6 (−19.5)	−38.0 (−36.4)	−42.0 (−43.6)	−49.0 (−56.2)
Average precipitation mm (inches)	29.7 (1.17)	23.9 (0.94)	16.5 (0.65)	18.8 (0.74)	39.4 (1.55)	64.8 (2.55)	82.2 (3.24)	64.2 (2.53)	47.6 (1.87)	33.9 (1.33)	30.9 (1.22)	34.8 (1.37)	486.7 (19.16)
Average extreme snow depth cm (inches)	47 (19)	61 (24)	61 (24)	58 (23)	24 (9.4)	0 (0)	0 (0)	0 (0)	1 (0.4)	13 (5.1)	24 (9.4)	41 (16)	65 (26)
Mean monthly sunshine hours	5	62	139	183	232	266	243	159	110	67	18	0	1,484
Source 1:
Source 2:

== See also ==
- Dislocation of Sámi people from Jukkasjärvi and Karesuando
