= Swedish county road =

Class of road in Sweden

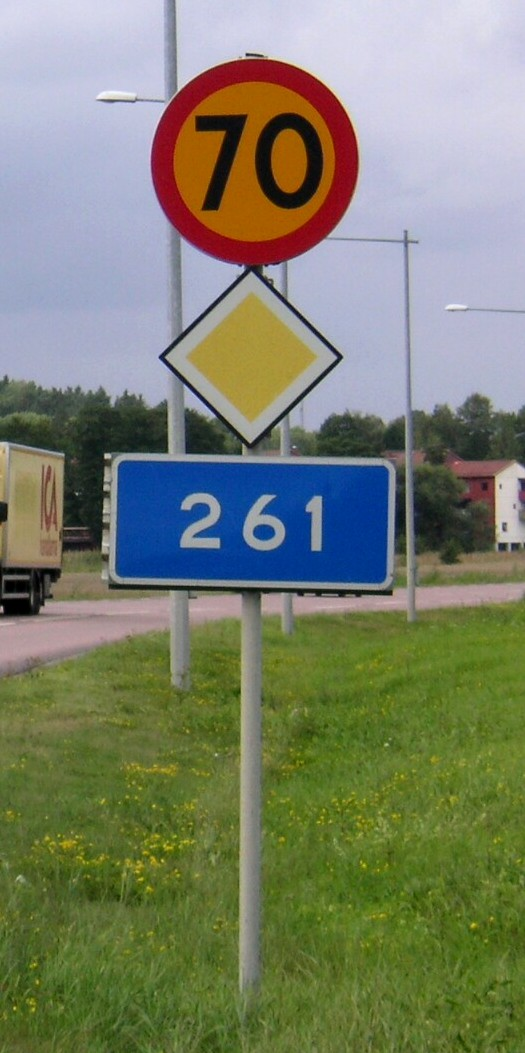
County road 261 on Ekerö.

Swedish county roads (Länsväg) are roads with road numbers from 100 and upwards in Sweden. The Swedish county roads are public roads maintained by the Swedish Transport Administration (Swedish: Trafikverket). There is a total of 82,873 km (51,495 mi) of county roads in Sweden.

The länsväg roads are divided into three categories:

Primary county road (primär länsväg)
Common number series in the range 100–499 throughout Sweden, and can stretch over county borders despite the name.
Secondary county road (sekundär länsväg)
Each county has its own number series in the range of 500–2999.
Tertiary county road (tertiär länsväg)
Each county has its own number series in the range of 3000–9999.

The primary county road number signs are rectangular with a blue background, white numbers, and a white border. The secondary and tertiary county roads are not signed along the roads, and they are prefixed with the county code of the county they are in.

== See also ==
- Swedish national road (Riksväg)
