= Meänkieli grammar =

Grammar of the Meänkieli language

Meänkieli is a Finnic variant spoken in northern Sweden by around 70,000 people. Although its status as an independent language is sometimes contested due to its mutual intelligibility with Finnish and its relationship with other Peräpohjola dialects, the Swedish state has granted Meänkieli with the status of an official minority language in Sweden and is thus treated as a separate language from standard Finnish by the Swedish authorities. A standardized literary language for Meänkieli has been created that is based around the dialects around Pajala, Övertorneå and Haparanda, which has been used in Meänkieli literature. This article mostly focuses on the grammar of the written language of Meänkieli.

== Personal pronouns ==
Personal pronouns in Meänkieli.

	1st person		2nd person		3rd person	
	singular	plural	singular	plural	singular	plural
Nominative	mie ("I")	met ("we")	sie ("you")	tet ("you")	se/hään ("he, she, it")	het ("they")
Accusative	minun	meän	sinun	teät	hänen	heät
Genitive	minun	meän	sinun	teän	hänen	heän
Partitive	minua	meitä	sinua	teitä	häntä	heitä
Illative	minhuun	meihin	sinhuun	teihin	hänheen	heihin
Inessive	minussa	meissä	sinussa	teissä	hänessä	heissä
Elative	minusta	meistä	sinusta	teistä	hänestä	heistä
Essive	minuna	meinä	sinuna	teinä	hänenä	heinä
Translative	minuksi	meiksi	sinuksi	teiksi	häneksi	heiksi
Adessive	mulla	meilä	sulla	teilä	hällä	heilä
Allative	mulle	meile	sulle	teile	hälle	heile
Ablative	multa	meiltä	sulta	teiltä	hältä	heiltä

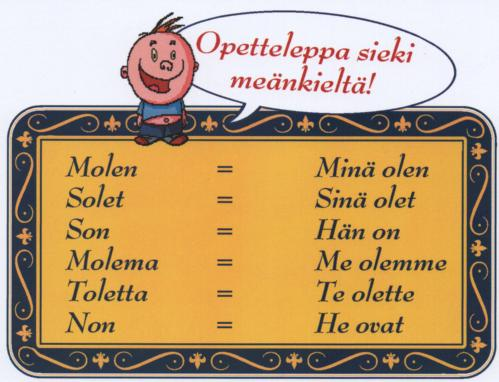
An image showing the combination of the personal pronoun and the verb 'to be' in colloquial Meänkieli. Translations in Standard Finnish.

In colloquial Meänkieli, the personal pronouns are sometimes combined with the word olla 'to be', such as in the word 'soli' which means "it was", however these combined words are not used in written Meänkieli.

Examples:

Colloquial Meänkieli	English
molen	I am
solet	you are
son/soon	he/she/It is
molema	we are
toletta	you are (plural)
non/noova/hoova	they are

== Consonant gradiation ==
Just like other Finnic languages, Meänkieli contains consonant gradiation. However, the consonant gradiation of Meänkieli contains some differences from that of standard Finnish:

Alternation	Example	Meaning
pp - p	kaappi - kaapissa	'cabinet - in the cabinet'
tt - t	katto – katola	'roof - on the roof'
kk - k	kukka – kukan	'flower - of the flower'
p - v	tupa – tuvassa	'cottage - in the cottage'
t - ∅	katu – kaula	'street - on the street'
ht - ∅	lähte- – lähen	'go - I go'
(consonant)k - ∅	jalka – jalan	'foot - of the foot'
k - j	ikä - ijän	'age - of the age'
mp - mm	ampuu – ammun	'shoot - I shoot'
nt - nn	santa – sannala	'sand - on the sand'
nk - ng	kenkä – kengän	'boot - of the boot'
lt - ll	valta – vallan	'power - of the power'
rt - rr	parta – parran,	'beard - of the beard'
lke - lje	kulke- kuljen	'pass - to pass'
rke - rje	särke- – särjen	'ache - I ache'
hke - hje	rohkene- – rohjeta	'dare - to dare'
k - v	suku – suvun	'family - of the family'

A notable difference from standard Finnish is the absence of d in consonant gradiation, for example the Meänkieli alternation of t - ∅ is instead t - d in standard Finnish, so the Meänkieli example of 'katu - kaula' becomes 'katu - kadulla' in standard Finnish.

In the Torne Valley dialects, the Finnish d is almost always replaced by ∅, causing forms such as paan 'of the cauldron', which in Finnish would be 'padan'.

== Nouns ==
Nominative case

The nominative is the base form of a word and does not have a suffix, however the plural is made by the ending -t. For example, talo 'house' becomes talot 'houses'.

Genitive case

The genitive case is used to express ownership and it is made with the ending -n in the singular. However, the plural genitive has multiple possible endings in Meänkieli, which are -tten, -ten, -jen, -in and -en. For example, kala 'fish' in the genitive becomes kaloitten or kalain, while the word mies 'man' becomes miehitten or miesten. The endings -in and -en are somewhat archaic, but are still sometimes used in modern Meänkieli.

Partitive case

The partitive case is used to express partialness or indefiniteness. It is formed by the suffixes -a, -ta, -tä, -ä. For example, in the sentence "karasissa oon piiliä" 'there are cars in the garage', the word piili 'car' is in the partitive case. The plural is formed by adding either -i(ta/tä) or -j(a/ä), for example talo 'house' become taloja in the plural.

Essive

The essive case is formed by the endings -na or -nä, and describes states of being and time. For example, in the sentence "mie olin kipeännä", the word kipeä 'sick' is in the essive case.

Accusative

The accusative case is used to express a direct object. It's formed by the ending -n in the singular and -t in the plural. For example, the word kirja 'book' in the accusative becomes "kirjan".

Translative

The translative is formed by the ending -ksi, which describes becoming something. For example, in the sentence "ko sie luet tätä kramatiikkia, sie tulet viishaamaksi", the word viisas 'wise' is in the translative. Examples include:

- pyörä - pyöräksi 'cycle - into (becoming) a cycle'
- suola - suolaksi 'salt - into (becoming) salt'

Inessive

The inessive describes being in or inside something, and it is formed by the ending -ssa or -ssä. For example, the word käsi 'hand' becomes "käessä" in the inessive. The plural is formed by inserting the vowel I before the singular case ending. For example, mettä 'forest' becomes mettässä in the singular inessive, while it becomes mettissä in the plural form. Other examples of the inessive include:

- maa 'ground' - maassa 'of the ground'
- kylä 'village' - kylässä 'of the village'
- pyörä - pyörässä 'cycle, in the cycle'
- suola - suolassa 'salt, in the salt'

Elative

The elative describes derivation, having the meaning 'of, from, out of' or it can refer to a thing spoken, written or thought about. The elative it is formed by the ending -sta or -stä. Examples of the elative include:

- nousin sohvasta 'I rose from the sofa'
- mie kerron reisusta 'I tell about the trip'
- mistä syystä 'for what reason'
- Lusikka oon puusta 'the spoon is (derived) from the tree'
- mie tärisen pölöstä 'I tremble from fear'

Illative

The illative in Meänkieli describes movement into something. It is formed by lengthening the last vowel with the suffix -n and aspirating the last consonant, while the plural is formed by the ending -in.

- pere 'family' - perheesheen 'into the family' - perheishiin 'into the families'
- tie'e 'science' - tietheesheen 'into science' - tietheishiin 'into sciences'
- maa 'land - maahan 'into the land' - maihin 'into the lands'
- koulu 'school' - kouhluun 'into the school', kouhluin 'into the schools'

Adessive

The adessive describes being at or on something. It can also be used to describe the tool of an action. It is formed by the endings -lla, -la, -llä and -lä. Examples of usage include:

- mulla oon rahhaa 'I have money'
- minun tyttärellä oon kaks lasta 'my daughter has two children'
- Yölä häätyy nukkua 'at night one must sleep'
- mie hakkasin tämän kirhveelä 'I chopped this with an axe'

Ablative

The ablative case in formed by the ending -lta or -ltä. The ablative indicates movement from something, for example in the sentence "mie tulen asemalta" (I come from the station), the word asema 'station' is in the ablative case.

Allative

The allative case is formed with the ending -lle or -le. It carries the meaning of "to" or "onto", for example in the sentence "tälle pojale", both the words "tämä" 'this' and poika 'boy' are in the allative case, meaning "to this boy".

Abessive, comitative and the instructive

The abessive, comitative and the instructive have heavily fallen out of use, although still existing within the language. The abessive is formed with the ending -tta or -ttä, and has the meaning of "without" and in some dialects people still use the abessive case after the word "ilman" which means "without", such as in the words "ilman rahatta" 'without money'. The comitative is formed with the ending -ihne + a possessive suffix, while the instructive is formed with the ending -in.

The word "tooli" 'chair' conjugated into all cases.

Case	Word	Meaning
Nominative	tooli	chair
Genitive	toolin	chair's
Partitive	toolia	chair
Essive	toolina	as a chair
Accusative	tooli(n)	chair
Inessive	toolissa	in the chair
Elative	toolista	from the chair
Illative	toohliin	into the chair
Adessive	toolila	on the chair
Ablative	toolilta	from the chair
Allative	toolile	to the chair
Abessive	toolitta	without a chair
Comitative	toolinheen	with the chair
Instructive	omin toolin	by (one's own) chair

== Adjectives ==
In Meänkieli, comparatives are generally formed with an -mpi ending, while superlatives with an -in ending.

Base form	Comparative	Superlative
iso 'big'	isompi 'bigger'	issoin 'biggest'
kova 'hard'	kovempi 'bigger'	koviin 'biggest'
selvä 'clear'	selvempi 'clearer'	selviin 'clearest'
fiini 'fine'	fiinimpi 'finer'	fiiniin 'finest'

== Verbs ==
In Meänkieli, verb conjugation depends on the personal pronouns. The word "tulla" 'come' is conjugated thus in the present tense:

Meänkieli	English
mie tulen	I come
sie tulet	you come
se/hään tullee	he/she/it comes
met tulema	we come
tet tuletta	you come
net/het tuleva	they come

Short verbs such as saa'a 'get', myyä 'sell', jua 'drink' and voija 'to be able to' end in the suffix -pi in the third person singular: saapi 'he gets', myypi 'he sells', juopi 'he drinks', voipi 'he can'. In the Gällivare variant, the third person plural form of the verb uses the passive ending, thus 'they ran' in Gällivare is 'juoshin', which in Finnish is 'juoksivat'.

The imperfect tense (which describes past events) is formed by the suffix -i. The word saa'a 'get/receive' is conjugated into the imperfect thus:

Meänkieli	English
mie sain	I got
sie sait	you got
se/hään sai	he/she/it got
met saima	we got
tet saitta	you got
net/het sait	they got

The perfect tense in Meänkieli is formed with the ending -nu/ny and the verb olla 'to be' in the present tense. The word ostaa 'buy' is conjugated thus into the perfect tense:

Meänkieli	English
mie olen ostanu	I have bought
sie olet ostanu	you have bought
se/hään oon ostanu	he/she/it has bought
met olema ostanheet	we have bought
tet oletta ostanheet	you have bought
net/het oon ostanheet	they have bought

The Meänkieli word "huomata" 'to notice' is thus conjugated into the present imperative forms:

Person	Meänkieli	Finnish
2p sg	huomaa	huomaa
3p sg	huomakhoon	huomatkoon
1p pl	huomaama	huomatkaamme
2p pl	huomakkaa	huomatkaa
3p pl	huomakhoot	huomatkoot

Similarly to Finnish, Meänkieli uses the verb "älä" to form negative imperatives, the word "huomata" is conjugated into the negative present imperative thus:

Person	Meänkieli	Finnish
2p sg	älä huomaa	älä huomaa
3p sg	älkhöön huomakko	älköön huomatko
1p pl	emmä huomaa	älkäämme huomatko
2p pl	älkää huomakko	älkää huomatko
3p pl	älkhööt huomakko	älkööt huomatko

== Aspiration ==
Unlike in Finnish, Meänkieli more often aspirates consonants and has specific rules for when consonants become aspirated. Aspiration is written by adding the letter h after or before a consonant. Consonants become aspirated after being followed by two vowels in the passive form of verbs, in the illative case, in the third infinitive, after the genetive forms of words that end with -e and in all perfect and pluperfect forms of verbs. Examples of aspiration include:

- Sauhnaan 'into the sauna'
- kauphaan 'into the store'
- Stokholmhiin 'into Stockholm'
- tulkhoon 'may he/she come'

A similar system exists in the Kven language.

== Vowel harmony ==
Just like Finnish, Meänkieli in its written form contains vowel harmony. However, a notable exception to this exists in the Gällivare dialects, where vowel harmony is completely lacking. This leads to forms such as kyla 'village', päiva 'day' and näkkuu 'is seen', which in standard Finnish would be 'kylä', 'päivä' and 'näkyy'.

== See also ==
- Meänkieli vocabulary
- Ingrian grammar
- Finnish grammar
