= Meänkieli vocabulary =

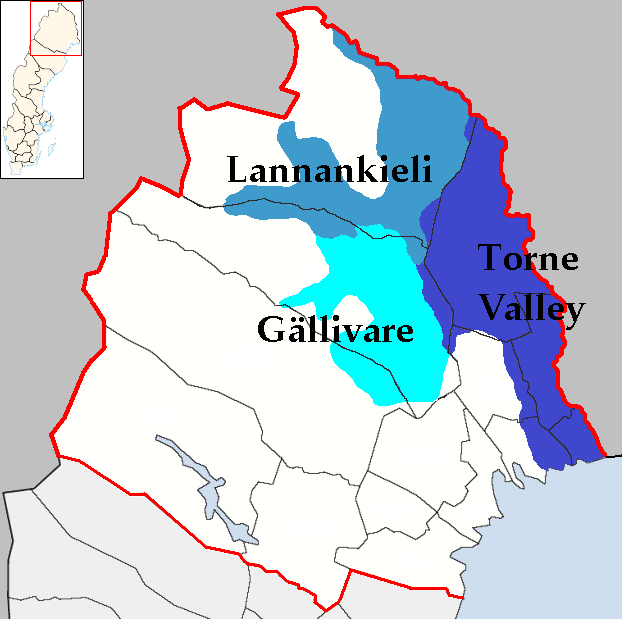
Map of Meänkieli variants

Meänkieli vocabulary, i.e., the vocabulary of the Meänkieli language, was influenced by many other language groups, particularly Swedish and Saami.

== Finnic languages ==
Meänkieli is a Finnic language, and speakers of Finnish can understand large portions of Meänkieli. Meänkieli vocabulary is particularly similar to the vocabulary of Northern Finnish dialects, however Finnish dialects spoken farther away from the Swedish border have far fewer similarities with Meänkieli. Nevertheless, Meänkieli words often have different meanings from how the word is used in Finnish (false friends), for example, the Meänkieli word 'pyörtyä' means 'to get lost', while the word 'pyörtyä' in Finnish refers to fainting. However, under Swedish influence, Finnic words in Meänkieli are often used in with Swedish idiomatic structures. For example, the Meänkieli phrase alusta jo reflects the Swedish expression redan från början, meaning “from the beginning.”

== Saami loanwords ==
Meänkieli has been spoken alongside Saami languages for many centuries, which is seen in the occurrence of a number of Saami words in Meänkieli, often containing phonological features that native Meänkieli words do not contain, such as the consonant cluster /tn/, seen in words such as katnanen 'hip bone'.

== Swedish loanwords ==
Meänkieli contains strong borrowing from Swedish, particularly due to being separated from the development of the Finnish language for the last 200 years. This is even seen in cases where both standard Finnish and Meänkieli have adopted the same Swedish loanword, as Meänkieli often keeps the pronunciation of spoken Swedish more closely. For example, the word for 'resource' is borrowed from Swedish in both languages:, however Finnish renders it as resurssi, whereas Meänkieli retains the Swedish-influenced pronunciation as resyrssi.

== Tables of word origin ==
Origin	Examples by semantic area		
Origin	Nature, family and the body	Cultural concepts	Abstract concepts and verbs
Finnic	Keho 'body', tongue 'kieli', silmä 'eye', käsi 'hand', mettä 'forest', järvi 'lake', jalka 'leg', joki 'river, ilma 'weather', hukka 'wolf'.	sauna 'sauna', sukset 'skis', sinni 'sisu'.	mie 'I', sie 'you', hään 'he/she', met 'we', tet 'you' het 'they', ellää 'to live', häätyä 'to have to'.
Saamic	tutna 'owl', katnanen 'hip bone', kuolfi 'mountain owl'	ketnia 'protective spirit', kaanij 'ghost' (Gällivare dialects), tonka 'the fat part of ham', (Gällivare dialects)	juttaa 'to travel, to migrate', mainoa 'to praise, to comment on'
Swedish	farmuuri 'grandmother', faari 'father', muuruutti 'carrot', potati 'potato'.	Kahveli 'fork', teevee 'TV', taattori 'computer'	pruukata 'have a habit of', praatata 'to speak', minuriteetti 'minority', inflašuuni 'inflation', följy 'company', klaarata 'to get along', fiskata 'to fish', pruuvata 'to try', hunteerata 'to think'.

== See also ==
- Meänkieli grammar
- Estonian Vocabulary
