= Ingrian grammar =

Grammar of the Ingrian language

The Ingrian language is a highly endangered language spoken in Ingria, Russia. Ingrian is a Uralic language of the Finnic branch, along with, among others, Finnish and Estonian. Ingrian is an agglutinative language and exhibits both vowel harmony and consonant gradation.

In the late 1930s, a written standard of the Ingrian language (referred to as kirjakeeli, "book language") was developed by the Ingrian linguist Väinö Junus. Following the Soviet Union's 1937 politics regarding minority languages, the Ingrian written language has been forbidden and Ingrian remains unstandardised ever since. This article describes the grammar of kirjakeeli with references to (modern) dialectal nuances.

== Morphological processes ==
=== Consonant gradation ===
Many words in Ingrian display consonant gradation, a grammatical process where the final consonant of a root may change in some inflected forms. Gradated words have two forms, called the strong grade and the weak grade. Follows a list of consonant gradations present in Ingrian, with examples:

Strong	Weak	Example		Translation
Strong	Weak	NOM.SG	GEN.SG	Translation
k	∅	jalka	jalan	"foot, leg"
nk	ng	kenkä	kengän	"shoe"
t	∅	vahti	vahin	"guard"
lt	ll	ilta	illan	"evening"
rt	rr	merta	merran	"basket"
nt	nn	ranta	rannan	"shore"
st	ss	riista	riissan	"thing"
p	v	apu	avun	"help"
mp	mm	kumpa	kumman	"which"
pp	p	leppä	lepän	"alder"
uut, yyt oot, ööt	uuvv, yyvv oovv, öövv	suuto	suuvvon	"court"
Vut	Vvv	rauta	ravvan	"iron"
Vuk	Vvv	leuka	levvan	"jaw, chin"
Vit	Vij	maito	maijon	"milk"
Vik	Vj	poika	pojan	"boy, son"
eik, iik	eij, iij	reikä	reijän	"hole"

=== Consonant gemination ===
In nominals and verbs alike, consonant gemination is an active process where a consonant following a light, uneven syllable, if followed by an (underlyingly) open syllable with a long vowel or a diphthong, is geminated. This process can be seen in the following examples:

sana ("word") → kaks sannaa ("two words")
käkö ("cuckoo") → kaks käkköä ("two cuckoos")

Gemination is absent before diphthong inherited from Proto-Finnic:

aja! ("drive!") → aijaa ("(s)he drives"), ajoi ("(s)he drove")

This gemination should not be confused with consonant gradation: Both can occur in one word. For instance, pittää ("to keep") has both consonant gradation and gemination:

pittää ("to keep"); miä piän ("I keep"); höö pitävät ("they keep")

Consonant gemination does not affect consonants that start an uneven syllable:

literatura ("literature"); literaturaa ("into the literature")

Some (recent) loanwords aren't affected by gemination either:

inženera ("engineer"); kaks inženeraa ("two engineers")

In the Soikkola dialect, there is a phonological distinction between primary geminates (those that were originally present in Proto-Finnic) and secondary geminates (those formed as a result of gemination). Primary geminates are realised as long, while secondary geminates are short. In the other dialects of Ingrian, both types of geminates are equally long.

=== Vowel elongation ===
In contrast with consonant gemination, nouns that do not have an even number of syllables or do not have a penultimate light syllable, experience vowel elongation in the inessive and adessive endings, where the final vowel becomes long:

paikka ("area") → paikaas ("in the area"), koira ("dog") → koiraal ("on the dog")
orava ("squirrel") → oravaal ("on the squirrel"), Soikkola ("Soikinsky Peninsula") → Soikkolaas ("on the Soikinsky Peninsula")

If the noun has consonant gradation, the weak grade determines the vowel length of the inflectional ending:

poika ("boy") → pojal ("on the boy")

In the Soikkola dialect, this rule also holds true for the elative, ablative, translative and exessive cases:

paikka ("area") → paigaast ("from the area")
orraava ("squirrel") → oravaalt ("off the squirrel")
soomi ("Finnish") → soomeeks ("in Finnish")

== Nouns ==
The Ingrian language does not distinguish gender in nouns, nor is there a definiteness distinction. Nouns can be declined for both case and number.

=== Cases ===
Ingrian nouns have thirteen noun cases. Unlike some plural pronouns, nouns don't have the accusative case and its function is taken over by either the genitive in the singular or the nominative in the plural.

Case	Suffix	English PREP	Example	Translation
nominative (nominativa)	-∅	—	talo	a house
genitive (genitiva)	-n	of/'s	talon	a house's
partitive (partitiva)	-(t)a / -(t)ä	a bit of	talloa	a bit of a house
illative (illativa)	-V	into	talloo	into a house
inessive (inessiva)	-s	inside	talos	inside a house
elative (elativa)	-st	out of	talost	out of a house
allative (allativa)	-lle	onto	talolle	onto a house
adessive (adessiva)	-l	on top of	talol	on top of a house
ablative (ablativa)	-lt	out of	talolt	out of a house
translative (translativa)	-ks	into (being)	taloks	into (being) a house
essive (essiiva)	-nna / -nnä	as	talonna	as a house
exessive (eksessiva)	-nt	out of (being)	talont	out of (being) a house
comitative (komitativa)	-nka / -nkä	with	talonka	with a house

In the modern (spoken) language, the exessive case has grown to be obsolete. Furthermore, the comitative is only present in the Ala-Laukaa dialect of the Ingrian language, although it was adopted into the written language as well.

Some of the endings differ among dialects. In the Soikkola dialect, for instance, the essive ending is -Vn rather than -nna, yielding talloon. On the other hand, many cases in the Ala-Laukaa dialect contain a final vowel: talossa, talosta, talolla, talolta, talokse, talonta.

==== Nominative ====
The nominative case is used primarily to mark the subject of a verb:

Kana kaakattaa ("The chicken cackles")
Kana muni munan ("The chicken laid an egg")

Furthermore, it can be used as a form of address:

Mama, miä tahon söövvä ("Mum, I want to eat")

==== Accusative ====
As mentioned above, the accusative isn't morphologically distinct from the genitive in the singular and the nominative in the plural. The accusative case is used to mark a direct object of an affirmative telic verb:

Poika sööp lihan ("The boy will eat the meat")
Tyttö näki koirat ("The girl saw the dogs")

The accusative is identical to the nominative when a direct object of an impersonal verb, a verb in the imperative mood, or impersonal constructions:

Söö liha! ("Eat the meat!")
Söövvää liha ("The meat is eaten")
Pittää söövvä liha ("It is necessary to eat the meat")

==== Partitive ====
The partitive is used in a number of functions. First of all, it is used to mark a direct object of an affirmative atelic verb or any negative verb:

Poika sööp lihhaa ("The boy is eating the meat")
Tyttö näki koiria ("The girl was seeing the dogs")
Elä söö lihhaa! ("Do not eat the meat!")
Ämmä ei nää koiraa ("Grandma doesn't see the dog")

Secondly, the partitive case is used with numerals (other than yks, "one") and determiners to designate amounts of an object:

Miul on kaks silmää ("I have two eyes")
Miä näin paljo koiria ("I saw a lot of dogs")

The partitive can be used to designate indefinite amounts:

Miul on rahhaa ("I have money")

The partitive is used in comparative constructions to mark the object of comparison:

Miä oon paremp häntä ("I am better than him")

Finally, the partitive is used as an indirect object of some postpositions:

Tämä ono podarka miun lapsia vart. ("This is a present for my children")

==== Genitive ====
The genitive is used primarily to mark a possession by the inflected noun:

Miä näin pojan koiran. ("I saw the boy's dog.")
Lapsiin pere on suur. ("The children's family is big.")

Furthermore, it is used as an indirect object of many prepositions and postpositions:

Talon al ei oo mittä. ("Under the house there isn't anything.")
Möö elämmä talon sises. ("We live inside the house.")

==== Illative ====
The illative is primarily used to describe a direction into something:

Miä mänin talloo. ("I went into the house.")
Miä tokuin merree. ("I fell into the sea.")

It is also used to mark the designation of an object:

Tämä poika tööhö ei kelpaa. ("This boy isn't fit for work.")

Furthermore, the illative is used to indicate a cause:

Miun emä kooli lässyy. ("My mother died of a sickness.")

Finally, the illative is used to denote a timespan during which something didn't happen:

En miä joont kahtee päivää. ("I haven't had a drink in two days.")

==== Inessive ====
The inessive is primarily used to describe a location inside something:

Miä oon talos. ("I am inside the house.")
Miä ujun meres. ("I am swimming in the sea.")

It is also used to describe a duration during which something has happened:

Ei stroitettu Rim yhes päivääs. ("Rome wasn't built in one day.")

==== Elative ====
The elative is primarily used to describe a movement out of something:

Miä tulin talost. ("I came out of the house.")
Miä hyppäisin merest. ("I jumped out of the sea.")

It is furthermore used to describe the subject of some kind of information:

Miä luen lehmilöist. ("I am reading about cows.")
Miä kirjutan meijen maast. ("I am writing about our country.")

The elative is used to denote a domain to which an object belongs:

Miä oon paremp kaikist lapsist. ("I am the best of all the children.")
Kaikest miun perreest, miä suvvaan vaa miun emmää. ("Out of all my family, I only love my mother")

Finally, the elative is used to denote a material from which something is made:

Miä tein pöksyt täst kankaast. ("I made trousers from this fabric.")
Laps teki samoljotan paperist. ("The child made an airplane from paper.")

==== Allative ====
The allative is primarily used to describe motion onto something:

Miä hyppäisin kannelle. ("I jumped onto the table.")
Kolja pani koiran stoolille. ("Kolja put the dog on the chair.")

It is furthermore used in a dative function to mark an indirect object:

Miä annoin hänelle omenan. ("I gave him an apple.")
Mitä hää siulle saoi? ("What did he say to you?")

==== Adessive ====
The adessive is primarily used to describe a location on top of something:

Miä issun kanneel. ("I am sitting on the table.")
Koljan koira ležžii stooliil. ("Kolja's dog is lying on the chair.")

It is also commonly used in a construction with the verb olla ("to be") to denote a possession:

Miul ono kirja. ("I have a book.")
Lapseel ovat pöksyt. ("The child has trousers.")

In the Soikkola dialect, the adessive is used instead of the comitative to denote an instrument of an action:

Miä kirjutan krandoššiil. ("I am writing with a pencil.")
Miä kuuntelen korviil. ("I am listening with [my] ears.")

Finally, the adessive is used to denote a location in time:

Ööl suet jahtiijaat. ("At night, the wolves hunt.")
Kesäl ilma ono lämmää. ("In summer, the weather is warm.")

==== Ablative ====
The primary function of the ablative is to describe a motion off of something:

Miä hyppäisin kanelt. ("I jumped off the table.")
Kolja nosti koiran stolilt. ("Kolja picked the dog up from the table.")

It is furthermore used to mark a source of an action:

Miä sain hänelt omenan. ("I got an apple from him.")
Mitä hää siult kuuli? ("What did he hear from you?")

==== Translative ====
The primary function of the translative is to describe one's change of state towards being something:

Miä tahon noissa siun ystäväks. ("I want to become your friend.")
I konna muuttui käppiäks tytöks. ("And the frog turned into a beautiful lass.")

It is also used to denote that an action was or will be done by a specific point in time:

Hää noisen sinnua unohtamaa voovven lopuks. ("He will forget you by the end of the year.")
Pittää meille ostaa podarkoja hänen nimipäiväks. ("We need to buy birthday presents for her birthday.")

Finally, the translative is used in many fixed impressions:

Miä läkkään ižoraks. ("I speak Ingrian")
Tämä poika näyttiijää oikiin käppiäks. ("This boy is (lit. seems) very pretty.")

==== Essive ====
The primary function of the essive is to describe one's current state of being:

Miun isä tekköö töötä kalastajanna. ("My father works as a fisherman.")
Miun emä ompelianna jaksaa laatia siun pöksylöjä. ("As a tailor, my mother can fix your trousers.")

It is also used to denote the point of time when an action occurs:

Pyhännä möö määmmä kirkkoo. ("On sunday we will go to church.")
Nimipäivännä miä sain paljo podarkoja. ("On my birthday I received a lot of presents.")

==== Exessive ====
The exessive is a rare case, and is practically not used outside of the literary language. It's used only to describe a change of state out of being something:

Miä tulin pois ompelijant. ("I stopped being a tailor.")

=== Stem types ===
A stem is the part of a word that can be changed by adding inflectional endings, and in most nominals corresponds to the nominative singular.

==== Vowel stems ====
Ingrian has several paradigms that involve a vowel that all endings are added onto. When pluralised, however, this vowel might change:

stem vowel	English	NOM.SG	GEN.SG	PTV.SG	ILL.SG	NOM.PL	GEN.PL	PTV.PL	ILL.PL	Notes
-a	chicken	kana	kanan	kannaa	kannaa	kanat	kannoin	kanoja	kannoi	Followed by nominals ending in -a when following a syllable with a, e or i and recent loanwords.
-a	dog	koira	koiran	koiraa	koiraa	koirat	koiriin	koiria	koirii	Followed by native nominals ending in -a when following a syllable with o or u.
-ä	summer	kesä	kesän	kessää	kessää	kesät	kessiin	kessiä	kessii	
-a/-ä	parent	vanhemp (<*vanhempa)	vanhemman	vanhempaa	vanhempaa	vanhemmat	vanhempiin	vanhempia	vanhempii	Followed by nominals with historically an underlying final -a or -ä that underwent full vowel reduction.
-e	leaf	lehti (<*lešte)	lehen	lehtiä	lehtee	lehet	lehtilöin	lehtilöjä	lehtilöihe	Followed by nominals where (pre-)Proto-Finnic *-e regularly changed to -i.
-i	guard	vahti	vahin	vahtia	vahtii	vahit	vahtiloin	vahtiloja	vahtiloihe	Followed by relatively recent borrowings, from after the Proto-Finnic period, ending in -i.
-o/-ö, -u/-y	birch	koivu	koivun	koivua	koivuu	koivut	koivuin, koivuloin	koivuja, koivuloja	koivuihe, koivuloihe	
-VV	earth	maa	maan	maata	maaha	maat	maijen	maita	maihe	Followed by nouns ending in long vowels and diphthongs. The illative takes on the final vowel, unless it's i, in which case the ending is -e.
-oi/-öi	slaughterhouse	boinoi	boinoin	boinoita	boinoihe	boinoit	boinoin	boinoita	boinoihe	Only used in Russian loanwords. In the Ala-Laukaa dialect, where the final -oi, -öi is pronounced as a monophthong, these nominals inflect as others ending in -o, -ö. In the Soikkola dialect, the plural cases are suppleted from the paradigm of nouns ending in -o, -ö.

In the Soikkola dialect, a separate paradigm exists for nouns ending in -oi (< Proto-Finnic -oi), which in the Ala-Laukaa dialect and Literary Ingrian have lost their final component of the diphthong:

stem vowel	English	NOM.SG	GEN.SG	PTV.SG	ILL.SG	NOM.PL	GEN.PL	PTV.PL	ILL.PL	Notes
[-oi-] (-o-)	fox	[reboi] (repo)	[revoin] (revon)	[reppooja] (reppoa)	[reppoi] (reppoo)	[revoid] (revot)	[reboloin] (reppoin, repoloin)	[reboloja] (repoja, repoloja)	[reboloihe] (reppoi, repoloihe)	Forms given in square brackets represent (approximate) pronunciation of the Soikkola form, the forms given below represent the Literary Ingrian form.

==== Consonant stems ====
Other nouns have their endings attached on a consonant base.

The largest group of these are nouns ending (underlyingly) in a -i, which resemble e-stems like lehti. The difference between this paradigm and that of e-stems is the partitive singular, where the ending is added onto the consonant and is -ta (-tä), rather than -a (-ä). Furthermore, for nouns that end in a consonant in the nominative singular, as well as some words with a short first syllable like vesi ('water'), esi ('front') and käsi ('hand'), the plural is formed with the plural suffix -i- rather than -lOi-.

The final consonant of these nouns must be either h, l, m, n, r, s or t:

English	NOM.SG	GEN.SG	PTV.SG	ILL.SG	NOM.PL	GEN.PL	PTV.PL	ILL.PL
tongue	keeli	keelen	keeltä	keelee	keelet	keelilöin	keelilöjä	keelilöihe
big	suur (<*suuri)	suuren	suurta	suuree	suuret	suuriin	suuria	suurii

Due to historical reasons, some nouns in this class have an irregular change of the stem:

English	NOM.SG	GEN.SG	PTV.SG	Notes
knife	veitsi	veitsen	veistä	In a cluster -Cs, the partitive singular stem is -s.
child	laps	lapsen	lasta	In a cluster -Cs, the partitive singular stem is -s.
water	vesi	veen	vettä	Word-final *-ti regularly became -si.
five	viis	viijen	viittä	Word-final *-ti regularly became -si.
snow	lumi	lumen	lunta	m assimilates to the following t.
one	yks	yhen	yhtä	In the nominative singular and in the plural, *-kt became -ks, while in the singular and nominative plural it became -ht (~ -h)

Some nouns historically ended on a consonant. In these nouns, the consonant before the final vowel is gradated:

English	NOM.SG	GEN.SG	PTV.SG
daughter	tytär (<*tüt'är)	tyttären	tytärtä

A final subclass of such nouns are those ending in -ut (-yt). These exhibit an irregular illative ending and form the plural differently from e-stem nouns:

English	NOM.SG	GEN.SG	PTV.SG	ILL.SG	NOM.PL	GEN.PL	PTV.PL	ILL.PL
Sun	päivyt	päivyen	päivyttä	päivyesse	päivyet	päivyein	päivyeitä	päivyeisse
beer	olut	olluen	olutta	olluesse	olluet	olluein	ollueita	ollueisse

Another large group of nouns in Ingrian end in the consonant -s. These, again, come in various inflection types:

stem consonant(s)	English	NOM.SG	GEN.SG	PTV.SG	ILL.SG	NOM.PL	GEN.PL	PTV.PL	ILL.PL	Notes
-nt-	third	kolmas	kolmannen	kolmatta	kolmantee	kolmannet	kolmansiin	kolmansia	kolmansii	Before -i, the stem consonants change to -ns-. In the partitive singular, the stem extends to -tt-.
-h-	man	mees	meehen	meestä	meehee	meehet	meehiin	meehiä	meehii	
-∅-	column	patsas	patsaan	patsasta	patsaasse	patsaat	patsain	patsaita	patsaisse	In the Soikkola dialect, the stem consonant -h- is retained (for instance, the genitive singular is patsahan)
-ks-	treason	petos	petoksen	petosta	petoksee	petokset	petoksiin	petoksia	petoksii	
-ks-	law	oikehus	oikehuen	oikehutta	oikehuee	oikehuet	oikehuksiin	oikehuksia	oikehuksii	The stem consonants only appears in the plural; In the singular, the stem-final -s is elided, while in the partitive, the stem extends to -tt-.
-m-	orphan	armatoin	armattoman	armatointa	armattommaa	armattomat	armattommiin	armattommia	armattommii	Note that in the nominative and partitive singular, the root ends in -in-, rather than the expected -n-.

A third group includes nouns ending in the consonant -n:

stem consonant(s)	English	NOM.SG	GEN.SG	PTV.SG	ILL.SG	NOM.PL	GEN.PL	PTV.PL	ILL.PL	Notes
-s-	fly	kärpäin	kärpäisen	kärpäistä	kärpäisee	kärpäiset	kärpäisiin	kärpäisiä	kärpäisii	In some words, like ihmiin ("human"), the vowel preceding -n is shortened in inflected forms. In the Soikkola dialect, the partitive singular retains a weak grade of the stem: kärpäin - kärväist.

Finally, some nouns ending in -e have an underlying stem consonant -∅-:

stem consonant(s)	English	NOM.SG	GEN.SG	PTV.SG	ILL.SG	NOM.PL	GEN.PL	PTV.PL	ILL.PL	Notes
-∅-	boat	vene	venneen	venettä	venneesse	venneet	vennein	venneitä	veneissee	Compare this noun class to nouns like patsas ("column").

This last paradigm corresponds to two paradigms in the Soikkola dialect, depending on the original final consonant in the term:

stem consonant(s)	English	NOM.SG	GEN.SG	PTV.SG	ILL.SG	NOM.PL	GEN.PL	PTV.PL	ILL.PL	Notes
-h-	boat	vene	[venneehen] (venneen)	[veneht] (venettä)	[venehesse] (venneesse)	[venneehed] (venneet)	[venehiin] (vennein)	[venehiä] (venneitä)	[venehisse] (venneisse)	

stem consonant(s)	English	NOM.SG	GEN.SG	PTV.SG	ILL.SG	NOM.PL	GEN.PL	PTV.PL	ILL.PL	Notes
-k-	boat	lähe	[lähtiin] (lähteen)	lähettä	[lähtiisse] (lähteesse)	[lähtiid] (lähteet)	[lähtilöin] (lähtein)	[lähtilöjä] (lähteitä)	[lähtilöihe] (lähteisse)	

==== Irregularly inflected nominals ====
Some nouns and adjectives are inflected like no other.

The noun roho ("grass") may inflect both like a vowel stem and a consonant stem:

stem consonant(s)	English	NOM.SG	GEN.SG	PTV.SG	ILL.SG	NOM.PL	GEN.PL	PTV.PL	ILL.PL	Notes
-∅-	grass	roho	rohon	rohhoa rohta	rohhoo	rohot	rohhoin roholoin	rohoja roholoja	rohhoi roholoihe	Likely arose through the productive process of assimilating an -e- after -h- to the preceding vowel. So, the nominative roho can be analysed as either underlyingly *roho or *rohe

The adjective sattais ("hundredth") is inflected extremely irregularly as well:

stem consonant(s)	English	NOM.SG	GEN.SG	PTV.SG	ILL.SG	NOM.PL	GEN.PL	PTV.PL	ILL.PL	Notes
-∅-	grass	sattais	saannen	saannetta	saanneesse	saannet	saannein	saanneita	saanneisse	The nominative was formed by adding the stop -t- to an earlier *saais (analogically to sata "hundred"). The genitive singular and nominative plural is the regular inflection of this form. The other forms are formed as if the term is an e-stem.

== Adjectives ==
Ingrian adjectives are inflected identically to nouns, and agree in number to the modified noun. In all cases but the comitative, the case of the adjectives also agrees with the case of the noun. A noun in the comitative is modified by an adjective in the genitive:

Ingrian	English
suur poika	"a big boy"
suuren pojan	"of the big boy"
kaks suurta poikaa	"two big boys"
suuren pojanka	"with the big boy"
suuret pojat	"big boys"

=== Comparative ===
The comparative degree of Ingrian adjectives is generally formed by adding the suffix -mp to the adjective:

Positive degree	English	Comparative degree	English
korkia	"high"	korkiamp	"higher"
noori (noore-)	"young"	nooremp	"younger"

In some cases, a stem-final -a, -ä is transformed into an -e- in the comparative:

Positive degree	English	Comparative degree	English
vanha	"old"	vanhemp	"older"
pitkä (pitä-)	"long"	pitemp	"longer"

The comparative degree of the adjective inflects just like any other nominal:

Ingrian	English
suuremp poika	"the bigger boy"
suuremman pojan	"of the bigger boy"

Note that comparative endings have an underlying final vowel -a (or -ä in front-vocalic words).

=== Superlative ===
Unlike Finnish and Estonian, Ingrian doesn't have a superlative degree morphologically distinct from the comparative. Instead, a form of the indefinite pronoun kaik ("all") is used together with the comparative:

Ingrian	English
kaikkia suuremp poika	"the biggest boy" (literally: "the boy bigger than all")
kaikkiin suuremp poika	"the biggest boy" (literally: "the boy biggest of all")
kaikkiis suuremp poika	"the biggest boy" (literally: "the boy biggest among all")

Furthermore, the adverb samoi (borrowed from the Russian самый) can be used together with either the positive or comparative form of the adjective to express a superlative:

Ingrian	English
samoi suur poika	"the biggest boy" (literally: "the most big boy")
samoi suuremp poika	"the biggest boy" (literally: "the most biggest boy")

== Pronouns ==
Ingrian pronouns are inflected similarly to their referent nouns. A major difference is the existence of the accusative (plural) in personal and some demonstrative pronouns, which is absent in all nouns and adjectives.

=== Personal pronouns ===
Unlike in Finnish, personal pronouns can be used to refer to both animate and inanimate nouns alike. Follows a table of personal pronouns:

	1st person		2nd person		3rd person	
	singular	plural	singular	plural	singular	plural
Nominative	miä ("I")	möö ("we")	siä ("you")	töö ("you")	hää ("he, she, it")	höö ("they")
Accusative	miun	meijet	siun	teijet	hänen	heijet
Genitive	miun	meijen	siun	teijen	hänen	heijen
Partitive	minnua	meitä	sinnua	teitä	häntä	heitä
Illative	miuhu	meihe	siuhu	teihe	hännee	heihe
Inessive	mius	meis	sius	seis	hänes	heis
Essive	miunna	meinnä	siunna	teinnä	hänennä	heinnä
Comitative	miunka	meijenkä	siunka	teijenkä	hänenkä	heijenkä

Other locative cases are formed using the appropriate nominal case endings to the inessive stem.

As seen above, Ingrian does not have grammatical gender, so the pronoun hää can be used for both male, female and inanimate referents alike. However, inanimate nouns are often referred to using the demonstrative pronoun se ("this") instead.

Some variation occurs among different dialects of Ingrian in regards to the personal pronouns. First of all, dialects with mid vowel raising exhibit the plural pronouns myy, tyy and hyy for möö, töö and höö respectively. Furthermore, in the Ala-Laukaa dialect, the third person singular pronoun hän is found instead of hää. Similar forms have been found also in the now-extinct Hevaha and Ylä-Laukaa dialects.

Since verbs in Ingrian conjugate according to grammatical person and number, subject personal pronouns may sometimes be omitted in Ingrian. In most cases, however, the person remains doubly marked, and the reasons for dropping the pronoun are similar to ones in Russian.

=== Demonstrative pronouns ===
Ingrian demonstratives can be used both as pronouns and as determiners in a determiner phrase. There are three sets of demonstratives: proximal (near to the speaker), distal (far from the speaker) and neutral, which is used to refer to an object without specifying its relative location is space, and is often used in anaphoras:

	Proximal		Distal		Neutral	
	singular	plural	singular	plural	singular	plural
Nominative	tämä ("this")	nämät ("these")	too ("that")	noo ("those")	se ("this, that")	neet ("these, those")
Accusative	tämän	nämät	toon	noo	sen	neet
Genitive	tämän	näijen	toon	noijen	senen	niijen
Partitive	tätä	näitä	toota	noota	sitä	niitä
Illative	tähä	näihe	tooho	noohe	siihe	niihe
Inessive	täs	näis	toos	noos	siin	niis
Elative	täst	näist	toost	noost	siint	niist
Allative	tälle	näille	toolle	noolle	sille	niille
Adessive	täl	näil	tool	nool	sil	niil
Ablative	tält	näilt	toolt	noolt	silt	niilt
Translative	täks	näiks	tooks	nooks	siks	niiks
Essive	tämännä	näinnä	toonna	noonna	senennä	niinnä

The proximal demonstratives can be contracted to tää (< tämä), tään (< tämän) and näät (< nämät). Again, in dialects with mid vowel raising, the distal demonstratives are tuu and nuu rather than too and noo respectively. Furthermore, in the Ala-Laukaa and the extinct Hevaha dialects, as well as among some speakers of the Soikkola dialect, the plural neutral pronoun is ne rather than neet.

The genitive and accusative singular of the neutral demonstrative pronoun are often used interchangeably, counter to the prescriptive usage described in Junus (1936). Furthermore, for most speakers of the modern Soikkola dialect, the functions of the distal demonstrative have been taken over by the neutral pronoun (se/neet).

=== Interrogative pronouns ===
Ingrian interrogatives are divided into one that has an animate referent (ken, "who?") and one that has an inanimate referent (mikä, "what?"). Originally, the latter is a combination of the pronoun *mi- and the interrogative clitic -kä, but its inflected forms are still formed on the basis of the free pronoun:

	Animate	Inanimate
Nominative	ken	mikä
Genitive	kenen	minen
Partitive	ketä	mitä
Illative	kehe	mihe
Inessive	kes	mis
Essive	kenennä	minennä

Other locative cases are formed using the appropriate nominal case endings to the inessive stem.

The interrogatives also have plural forms of the nominative, ket and mit respectively. Other case forms are used in the singular and plural alike. Like in Finnish and Estonian, but also English, the interrogatives are also used as relative pronouns:

Mikä ono? ("What is it?")
En tiije, mikä ono. ("I don't know, what it is.")

== Verbs ==
=== Person and number ===
Ingrian verbs inflect for three persons, two numbers, and feature a separate impersonal form.

Number	Person	Suffix	Example	Translation
singular	first	-n	(miä) etsin	I search for
singular	second	-t	(siä) etsit	you (SG) search for
singular	third	-V	(hää) etsii	he/she/it searches for
plural	first	-mma / -mmä	(möö) etsimmä	we search for
plural	second	-tta / -ttä	(töö) etsittä	you (PL) search for
plural	third	-Vt -vat / -vät	(höö) etsiit etsivät	they search for
impersonal		-taa / -tää	etsitää	one searches

The impersonal form may always be used to denote the third person plural.

=== Mood ===
Ingrian verbs inflect for four moods: indicative, conditional, imperative and potential. Of these, the potential is very rare.

The indicative mood is the only one to feature a past tense separate from the present tense and not formed by means of modal verbs.

Mood	Suffix	Example	Translation
PRES indicative	-∅	(hää) tahtoo	he/she/it wants
IMPERF indicative	-i	(hää) tahtoi	he/she/it wanted
conditional	-is(i)	(hää) tahtois	he/she/it would have wanted
potential	-ne	(hää) tahtonoo	he/she/it may want

The paradigm of the impersonal forms is irregular:

Mood	Suffix	Example	Translation
PRES indicative	-taa/-tää	tahotaa	one wants
IMPERF indicative	-ttii	tahottii	one wanted
conditional	-ttais/-ttäis	tahottais	one would have wanted
potential	-ttanoo/-ttänöö	tahottannoo	one may want

In verbs whose stems end in -n, -l, -r, -s, -h the initial -t- of the impersonal forms is dropped, or (in the case of present indicative) assimilated to the preceding consonant:

männä - män- ("to go") → männää, mäntii etc.
kuulla - kuul- ("to hear") → kuullaa, kuultii etc.
purra - pur- ("to bite") → purraa, purtii etc.
pessä - pes- ("to wash") → pessää, pestii etc.
nähä - näh- ("to see") → nähhää, nähtii etc.

The imperative paradigm is also highly irregular compared to the other three moods, and occurs only in the second and third person, as well as the impersonal:

Number	Person	Suffix	Example	Translation
singular	second	-∅	(siä) taho	want! (SG)
singular	third	-koo / -köö	(hää) tahtokoo	he/she/it must want
plural	second	-kaa / -kää	(töö) tahtokaa	want! (PL)
plural	third	-koot -kööt	(höö) tahtokoot	they must want
impersonal		-ttakoo / -ttäköö	tahottakkoo	one must want

==== Indicative mood ====
The indicative mood is used to describe actions that either have happened, are happening at the moment, or will inevitably happen:

Miä käyn ulitsaa mööt ("I am walking along the road")
Miä ujuin joes ("I was swimming in the river")

The present forms of the indicatives can always be used to describe a future action:

Hoomeen, miä mään škouluu ("Tomorrow, I am going to go to school")

==== Conditional mood ====
The conditional mood is used to describe actions which would have happened if a certain condition were met; At the same time, it is used to describe that condition:

Jos miä olisin suur, mänisin škouluu ("If I were big, I would go to school")

When the condition refers to the future, or is a general remark that is true regardless of time, the indicative is used instead:

Jos oon suur, mään škouluu ("If I am (ever) big, I will go to school")
Jos katsoa, voip nähä ("If one looks, he will be able to see")

==== Imperative mood ====
The imperative mood is used to give commands, either directly (to one's collocutor), or by expressing a wish about a third person:

Anna sitä miulle! ("Give that to me!")
Emä olkoo terve! ("May mother be healthy!")

In the first person, there is no imperative, and instead other constructions are used with a similar effect:

Anna miä laulan ("Let me sing")
Laa möö määmmä kottii ("Let us go home")

==== Potential mood ====
The potential mood is used to describe actions that are likely, but uncertain to happen:

Miä kirjuttanen kirjan ("I will probably write a letter")

The potential forms of the verb olla ("to be") are irregular, and are used as a separate future tense instead:

Miä leenen suur ("I will be big")

The potential forms are frequently followed by the clitics -k and -kse.

=== Stem types ===
Like nominals, verbs can be divided into a number of inflectional classes, according to which they are inflected, each class associated with a particular form of the stem.

==== Vowel stems ====
stem vowel	English	1st. INF	PRES.IND		IMPERF.IND		PRES.COND		Notes
stem vowel	English	1st. INF	1SG	3SG	1SG	3SG	1SG	3SG	Notes
-o/-ö -u/-y	to look	katsoa	katson	katsoo	katsoin	katsoi	katsoisin	katsois	
-a/-ä	to sow	kylvää	kylvän	kylvää	kylvin	kylvi	kylväisin	kylväis	
-a/-ä	to plough	kyntää	kynnän	kyntää	kynsin	kynsi	kyntäisin	kyntäis	Followed by verbs whose stem ends on -nta- (-ntä-), -lta- (-ltä-), -rta- (-rtä-), or -Vta- (-Vtä-)
-a	to pay	maksaa	maksan	maksaa	maksoin	maskoi	maksaisin	maksais	Followed by bisyllabic verbs whose first stem vowel is either -a-, -e- or -i-
-e	to lower	laskia	lasen	laskoo	lasin	laski	laskisin	laskis	In the infinitive, the historical combination *-ea (*-eä) regularly becomes -ia (-iä). In the third person singular present, the historical combination *-ee regularly becomes -oo/-öö.
-i	to believe	sallia	sallin	sallii	sallin	salli	sallisin	sallis	
-Vi	to rain	vihmoja	vihmoin	vihmoi	vihmoin	vihmoi	vihmoisin	vihmois	Note that the -i- intervocalically becomes -j-: *vihmoi+a > vihmoja
-VV	to marry	naija	nain	naip	nain	nai	naisin	nais	Followed by monosyllabic verbs ending in an unrounded vowel. Unlike in other inflections, the infinitive ending is -ja (-jä) instead of -a (-ä) and the third person singular present ending is -p.
-VV	to eat	söövvä	söön	sööp	söin	söi	söisin	söis	Followed by monosyllabic verbs ending in a rounded vowel. Unlike in other inflections, the infinitive ending is -vva (-vvä) instead of -a (-ä) and the third person singular present ending is -p.

==== Consonant stems ====
Most consonant stem types are inflected in much the same way as laskia, but exhibit an intrusive consonant in moods other than the infinitive:

stem consonant(s)	English	1st. INF	PRES.IND		IMPERF.IND		PRES.COND		Notes
stem consonant(s)	English	1st. INF	1SG	3SG	1SG	3SG	1SG	3SG	Notes
-s-/-r-	to wash	pessä	pesen	pessöö	pesin	pesi	pesisin	pesis	The infinitive ending goes back to an original *-stak / *-rdak, which then regularly developed into -ssa and -rra, respectively.
-l-	to fly around	lennellä	lentelen	lentelöö	lentelin	lenteli	lentelisin	lenteliis	Formally identical to the preceding type, with the exception that the syllable preceding the stem consonant may gradate.
-ts-	to choose	valita	valitsen	valitsoo	valitsin	valitsi	valitsisin	valitsiis	
-ks-	to run	joossa	jooksen	jooksoo	jooksin	jooksi	jooksisin	jooksiis	
-n-	to flee	paeta	pakenen	pakenoo	pakenin	pakeni	pakenisin	pakeniis	

Two other frequent types of consonant stems used to feature the Proto-Finnic consonant *-d-, which was regularly lost in Ingrian:

stem consonant(s)	English	1st. INF	PRES.IND		IMPERF.IND		PRES.COND		Notes
stem consonant(s)	English	1st. INF	1SG	3SG	1SG	3SG	1SG	3SG	Notes
-∅-	to borrow	lainata	lainaan	lainajaa	lainaisin	lainais	lainajaisin	lainajais	The vowel preceding the stem consonant is duplicated after it, resulting in a long vowel in the present indicative. If the preceding vowel is -i-, the imperfect forms keep only one -i- (e.g. hävitä - hävisin - hävijäisin).
-∅-	to be ashamed	hävetä	häppiin	häpijää	häpisin	häpis	häpijäisin	häpijäis	Note how the vowel preceding the stem consonant changes from -e- to -i-.

A final type of vowel stems, which are unique to Ingrian, are reflexive conjugations, which are formed with the suffix -issa and its allomorphs:

stem consonant(s)	English	1st. INF	PRES.IND		IMPERF.IND		PRES.COND		Notes
stem consonant(s)	English	1st. INF	1SG	3SG	1SG	3SG	1SG	3SG	Notes
-∅-	to descend	laskiissa	laskiin	laskiijaa	laskiisin	laskiis	laskiijaisin	laskiijais	Note how unlike the lainata-type conjugations, this verb features a long vowel throughout the paradigm
-∅-	to throw up	oksentaissa	oksentaan	oksentaijaa	oksentaisin	oksentais	oksentaijaisin	oksentaijais	Formally identical to the preceding type, with the exception that the verb contains a diphthong instead of a long vowel before the stem consonant.
-∅-	to separate	erahussa	erahun	erahuu	erahuin	erahui	erahuisin	erahuis	

==== Irregular verbs ====
There are a handful of verbs in Ingrian that do not follow the above mentioned patterns. These will be discussed here in detail.

The most irregular verb in Ingrian is the copulative verb olla ("to be"). Overall, it mostly follows the pattern of l-final consonant stems (like lennellä), but features a completely irregular present indicative, imperative, and potential paradigms (as mentioned above, the potential is used to mark the future tense of this verb):

Number	Person	Indicative	Imperative	Potential
singular	first	oon	—	leenen
singular	second	oot	oo!	leenet
singular	third	ono on	olkoo!	leenöö lee
plural	first	oomma	—	leenemmä
plural	second	ootta	olkaa!	leenettä
plural	third	ovat	olkoot!	leenööt
impersonal		ollaa	oltakoo!	oltanöö

The rest of the forms are formed regularly, according to the l-final stems.

The verbs tulla ("to come"), männä ("to go") and panna ("to put") also mostly follows the l-final stems in conjugation, except in the indicative and the second-person singular imperative:

Number	Person	tulla	männä	panna
singular	first	töön / tyen	mään	paan
singular	third	tulloo	männöö	pannoo
plural	first	töömmä / tyemmä	määmmä	paamma
plural	third	tulloot tulevat	männööt mänevät	pannoot panevat
impersonal		tullaa	männää	pannaa
imperative		töö! / tye!	mää!	paa!

The verbs nähä ("to see") and tehä ("to do") are also conjugated according to the l-final stems, but feature a stem ending in -k- (which gradates regularly with -∅-) in indicative and conditional non-impersonal forms, the second-person singular imperative, the present active participle, and in the 3rd and 4th infintives:

Number	Person	nähä	tehä
singular	first	nään / näen	teen
singular	third	näkköö	tekköö
plural	first	näämmä / näemmä	teemmä
plural	third	näkkööt näkevät	tekkööt tekevät
impersonal		nähhää	tehhää
imperative		nää!	tee!
4th infinitive		näkömiin	tekömiin
active participle		näkövä	tekövä

The verbs seissa ("to stand") and haissa ("to smell") are conjugated very similarly, featuring the stem seiso- and haiso- (following -o final verbs like katsoa) in indicative and conditional non-impersonal forms, the second-person singular imperative, the present active participle, and in the 3rd and 4th infintives:

Mood	Person	seissa	haissa
PRES indicative	1SG	seison	haison
PRES indicative	3SG	seisoo	haisoo
PRES indicative	IMPRS.SG	seissaa	haissaa
IMPERF indicative	1SG	seisoin	haisoin
IMPERF indicative	3SG	seisoi	haisoi
IMPERF indicative	IMPRS.SG	seistii	haistii
conditional	1SG	seisoisin	haisoisin
conditional	3SG	seisois	haisois
conditional	IMPRS.SG	seistais	haistais
4th infinitive		seisomiin	haisomiin
PRES ACT PTCP		seisova	haisova
PRES PASS PTCP		seissava	haissava

The verbs tiitää ("to know"), siitää ("to tolerate") and tuntaa ("to feel"), but feature the weak stems tiije- and tunne- instead of tiijä- and tunna-, respectively:

Mood	Person	tiitää	siitää	tuntaa
PRES indicative	1SG	tiijen	siijen	tunnen
PRES indicative	3SG	tiitää	siitää	tuntaa
PRES indicative	IMPRS.SG	tiijetää	siijetää	tunnetaa
IMPERF indicative	1SG	tiisin	siisin	tunsin
IMPERF indicative	3SG	tiisi	siisi	tunsi
IMPERF indicative	IMPRS.SG	tiijettii	siijettii	tunnettii
conditional	1SG	tiitäisin	siitäisin	tuntaisin
conditional	3SG	tiitäis	siitäis	tuntais
conditional	IMPRS.SG	tiijettäis	siijettäis	tunnettais
4th infinitive		tiitämiin	siitämiin	tuntamiin
PRES ACT PTCP		tiitävä	siitävä	tuntava
PRES PASS PTCP		tiijettävä	siijettävä	tunnettava

The last two irregular verbs are sannoa and lähtiä. The former shows the weak stem sao-, whereas the latter shows the past stem läksi-.

Mood	Person	sannoa	lähtiä
PRES indicative	1SG	saon	lähen
PRES indicative	3SG	sannoo	lähtöö
PRES indicative	IMPRS.SG	saotaa	lähetää
IMPERF indicative	1SG	saoin	läksin
IMPERF indicative	3SG	saoi	läksi
IMPERF indicative	IMPRS.SG	saottii	lähettii
conditional	1SG	sanoisin	lähtisin
conditional	3SG	sanois	lähtis
conditional	IMPRS.SG	saottais	lähettäis
4th infinitive		sanomiin	lähtömiin
PRES ACT PTCP		sanova	lähtevä
PRES PASS PTCP		saottava	lähettävä

=== Infinitives ===
Ingrian verbs possess four different infinitive forms, each of which may be inflected in various cases:

Number	Case	Ending	Example	Translation
1st	nominative	-(t)a/-(t)ä	tahtoa	to want
2nd	inessive	-(t)es	tahtojees	when wanting
2nd	instructive	-(t)en	tahtoen	by wanting
3rd	illative	-maa/-mää	tahtomaa	with the intention of wanting
3rd	inessive	-mas/-mäs	tahtomaas	in the act of wanting
3rd	elative	-mast/-mäst	tahtomast	from just having been wanting
3rd	abessive	-mata/-mätä	tahtomata	without wanting
4th	nominative	-miin	tahtomiin	the act of wanting

The fourth infinitive is formally a verbal noun but is fully productive and may occur in certain (rare) grammatical constructions.

=== Participles ===
Every Ingrian verb has four distinct participles:

Tense	Voice	Ending	Example	Translation
present	active	-va/-vä	tahtova	that wants
present	passive	-ttava/-ttävä	tahottava	that is wanted
past	active	-nt -nut/-nyt	tahtont tahtonut	that wanted
past	passive	-ttu/-tty	tahottu	that was wanted

The formation of the past active participle is not always straightforward. Verb stems ending in the consonants -n, -l, -r and -s, -h assimilate the initial consonant of the ending to the stem consonant:

männä - män- ("to go") → mänt, männyt
kuulla - kuul- ("to hear") → kuult, kuullut
purra - pur- ("to bite") → purt, purrut
pessä - pes- ("to wash") → pest, pessyt
nähä - näh- ("to see") → näht, nähnyt

In verbs whose stems end in -n, -l, -r, -s, -h the initial -t- of the passive participles is also lost:

männä - män- ("to go") → mänty, mäntävä
kuulla - kuul- ("to hear") → kuultu, kuultava
purra - pur- ("to bite") → purtu, purtava
pessä - pes- ("to wash") → pesty, pestävä
nähä - näh- ("to see") → nähty, nähtävä

=== Negation ===
The negative in Ingrian is expressed with the negative verb ei, which is conjugated irregularly:

Number	Person	Indicative	Imperative
singular	first	en	—
singular	second	et	elä
singular	third	ei	elköö
plural	first	emmä	—
plural	second	että	elkää
plural	third	evät	elkööt

The negative verb is used with various forms of the main verb, called connegatives, to express the negation of that main verb. These connegatives vary by mood, but not by person:

Mood	Ending	Example	Translation	Notes
PRES indicative	-∅	(hää) ei taho	he/she/it doesn't want	identical in form to the second-person singular imperative
IMPERF indicative	-nt -nut/-nyt	(hää) ei tahtont (hää) ei tahtonut	he/she/it didn't want	identical in form to the past active participle
conditional	-is	(hää) ei tahtois	he/she/it wouldn't have wanted	identical in form to the third-singular conditional
potential	-ne	(hää) ei tahtone	he/she/it may not want	

In the imperative, there is a separate connegative for the second person singular and all other persons:

Mood	Ending	Example	Translation	Notes
2sg imperative	-∅	elä taho!	do not want!	identical in form to the second-person singular imperative
non-2sg imperative	-ko/-kö	elköö tahtoko	he/she/it must not want	

To express the negation of the impersonal forms of a verb, the third singular form of the negative is used with an impersonal connegative, which also inflects by mood:

Mood	Ending	Example	Translation	Notes
PRES indicative	-ta/-tä	ei tahota	it is not wanted	
IMPERF indicative	-ttu/-tty	ei tahottu	it was not wanted	identical in form to the past passive participle
conditional	-ttais/-ttäis	ei tahottais	it would not have been wanted	identical in form to the impersonal conditional
potential	-ttane/-ttäne	ei tahottane	it may not be wanted	
imperative	-ttako/-ttäkö	ei tahottako	it must not be wanted	

To negate any other verbal or non-verbal form the negative verb, inflected to the person of the subject of the main clause, is placed directly before this form:

Miä en taho siin en olla ("I do not want to not be here")
Miä en maha en suutia enkä laatia ("I can neither judge nor decree")

Note that in Ingrian, double negatives are obligatory:

Kenkää sitä ei tiije ("Nobody knows that")
Miä mittää en teht ("I did nothing / I did not do anything")

== Adverbs ==
Ingrian adverbs are most commonly derived from adjectives by adding the suffix -st:

Ingrian	English		Ingrian	English
hyvä	"good"	→	hyväst	"well"
kerkiä	"easy"	→	kerkiäst	"easily"
rauhalliin	"peaceful"	→	rauhallisest	"peacefully"

Note that the resulting form is always identical to the elative singular of the adjective.

Other frequent methods of forming adverbs include using the illative or adding the suffixes -in, -staa, -ttee and others.

Comparative adverbs are very rare, and are exclusively formed from comparative adjectives:

tihti ("frequent"), tihimp ("more frequent") → tihtii ("frequently"), tihimpää ("more frequently")

== Numerals ==
Ingrian features morphologically distinct cardinal and ordinal numbers:

Number	Cardinal	Ordinal
0	nolli	—
1	yks	ensimäin
2	kaks	toin
3	kolt	kolmas
4	neljä	neljäs
5	viis	viijes
6	kuus	kuuvves
7	seitsen	seitsemäs
8	kaheksan	kaheksas
9	yheksän	yheksäs
10	kymmen	kymmenäs
100	sata	sattais
1000	tuhatta	tuhattais

Numbers from 11-19 are formed by adding the single cardinal numeral to -toist ("of the second") and -toist kymmenäs for the cardinal and ordinal numbers, respectively:

3 kolt → 13 kolttoist
3-s kolmas → 13-s kolttoist kymmenäs

Terms for tens are formed by adding the single cardinal numeral to -kymment ("of teen") and -kymmenäs ("tenth") for the cardinal and ordinal numbers, respectively:

3 kolt → 30 koltkymment
3-s kolmas → 30-s koltkymmenäs

Other terms from 21-99 are formed by simply stacking the single numerals onto the number for a multiple of tens:

20 kakskymment → 21 kakskymment yks
20-s kakskymmenäs → 21-s kakskymmenäs ensimäin

An alternative way of forming these numerals is also attested, where the above method of 11-19 is used:

20 kakskymment → 21 ykskolmatta
20-s kakskymmenäs → 21-s ykskolmatta kymmenäs

The object of cardinal numbers other than yks (1) is always put in the partitive singular:

yks koira ("one dog")
kaks koiraa ("two dogs")
sata koiraa ("a hundred dogs")
sata yks koiraa ("a hundred and one dogs")

When the cardinal number is inflected, the object noun is inflected to the same case, but stays singular:

Miä möin kolmenkymmenän sian korman ("I sold the fodder of thirty pigs")
Sil kolmeel lehmääl ono sama karva ("Those three cows have the same colour")

Unlike simple nouns, where the direct object of telic verbs is expressed by the accusative (genitive/nominative) case, nouns modified by a numeral keep the same form in the function of the telic direct object as of the subject:

Miä ossin kaks lehmää ("I bought two cows")
Miä ossin kahta lehmää ("I was buying two cows")
Kaks lehmää ostiit miun ("Two cows bought me")

This rule is also extended to a handful of pronouns:

Miä ossin kaik ("I bought everything")
Miä ossin kaikkia ("I was buying everything")
Kaik ono hyvä ("Everything is good")

For plural-only nouns, either a measure word or the plural of the numeral should be used:

Miul ono kaks parria ackoja. ("I have two pairs of glasses.")
Miul ono kahet ackat. ("I have two pairs of glasses.")

== Sentence structure ==
=== Question formation ===
In Ingrian, questions are formed either by using an interrogative word, or by adding the interrogative clitic -k (or its variants -ka / -kä and -ko / -kö) to the first word (or, in the case of nouns, phrase) in a sentence:

Mitä siä sööt? ("What are you eating?")
Suvvaatk siä siun vanhempia? ("Do you love your parents?")

The most frequent interrogative pronouns include ken ("who"), mikä ("what"), kuka ("which (of many)"), kumpa ("which one").

The most frequent interrogative determiners include millain ("what kind"), kumpa ("which") and monta ("how many").

Ingrian interrogative adverbs include kuin ("how"), miks ("why") and kons ("when").

Interrogatives are usually put at the beginning of a sentence.

=== Deliberative ===
The deliberative mood, denoting indirect questions, is expressed by adding either the particle -kse or, as with direct questions, -k, to the indicative or the potential:

Miä en tiije, leenöökse rookaa pulmiis. ("I don't know, whether there will be food at the wedding.")
Pittää sannoa, tahommak möö söövvä. ("We have to say, whether we want to eat.")
Tehnenkse miä sen? ("Shall I do it?")

=== Discourse particles ===
Ingrian has a rich system of discourse particles, some of which are inherited from Proto-Finnic, while others are borrowed from Russian.

The free particle i has the same function as the clitic -ki, and both can be used together to enhance the effect; these particles are used to denote an extreme which was fulfilled in a positive sentence:

Miä hänelleki annoin podarkaa. ("I gave him a present, too.")
Miä i Pettoaki kutsuin. ("I even invited Peto.")

The negative counterpart of -ki and i is the clitic -kaa, which denotes an extreme that wasn't fulfilled in a negative sentence:

Miul ei oo kopekkaakaa. ("I don't even have a kopek.")

The particle davai is used to denote the agent starting an action, especially with some enthousiasm:

Mees näki varasta ja davai häntä löömää. ("The man saw the thief and off he went hitting him.")

The clitic -to is used to denote a contrastive emphasis:

Laa Annu ostaa viinaa, hänel-to ono rahhaa. ("Let Annu buy the alcohol, she has money, after all.")

Similarly emphatic particles že and vet are used to appeal to the collocutor's agreement:

No miä že en tiije, mont hänel ono rahhaa. ("Well I don't know how much money she has, do I?")
Miä en saa olla traktoristanna, miul vet ei oo traktoraa. ("I can't be a tractorist, I don't have a tractor, do I?")

The clitic -pa has two functions; firstly, it is used to denote surprise or disappointment:

Kuinpa lapset ollaa reukkaat! ("Gosh, how dirty children are!")

Secondly, -pa can be used to express concessions or admissions:

Miulpa ei oo lapsiloja, mut miä oon näht heijet! ("Well, I don't have any children, but I've seen them!")

Finally, the clitic -haa can be used to engage the collocutor in the conversation, especially while indicating surprise:

Petteriis ono, kuinhaa saotaa, muuzeja. ("In Saint Peteresburg there is a, whaddayacallit again, a museum.")
Siinhää muuzejaas ono ižoralain kannel. ("In that museum there is an Izhorian kannel, you know!")

== Bibliography ==
- V. I. Junus (1936). Iƶoran Keelen Grammatikka (PDF). (in Ingrian)
- A. Laanest (1966). "Ижорский Язык". Финно-Угорские и Самодийские языки. Языки народов мира. pp. 102–117.
- O. I. Konkova and N. A. D'yachkov (2014). Inkeroin keel: Учебное пособие по Ижорскому языку (PDF). (in Russian)
